= Curiel =

== Geography ==
- Curiel de Duero, a municipality in Spain

== Others ==
- Curiel (brand), italian fashion brand

== People ==
As a surname, Curiel may refer to:

- Abraham Curiel (1545–1609), Portuguese physician
- Alonso Curiel (fl. 1577–1603), Spanish merchant and diplomat
- Augusta Curiel (1873–1937), Surinamese photographer
- Carlos Curiel (1913–unknown), Mexican Olympic diver
- César Curiel (b. 1949), Mexican professional wrestler
- Danielle "DaniLeigh" Curiel (b. 1994), Dominican-American singer, songwriter, rapper, dancer, and choreographer
- David Curiel (1594–1666), Portuguese merchant and diplomat
- David T. Curiel (b. 1956), American cancer biologist
- Derek Curiel (born 2005), American baseball player
- Elias David Curiel (1871–1924), Venezuelan poet
- Enrique Curiel (1947–2011), Spanish politician
- Eugenio Curiel (1912–1945), Italian physicist and resistance member
- Federico Curiel (1917–1985), Mexican filmmaker
- Fernando Curiel (b. 1942), Mexican writer
- Francisco Curiel, Spanish philologist
- Francisco Velasco Curiel (1922–1984), Mexican politician
- Freddy Curiel (b. 1974), boxer from the Dominican Republic
- Gonzalo Curiel (composer) (1904–1958), Mexican film composer
- Gonzalo P. Curiel (b. 1953), United States District Judge
- Héctor González Curiel (b. 1968), Mexican engineer and politician
- Henri Curiel (1914–1978), Egyptian activist
- Israel ben Meir di Curiel (1501–1573), rabbi at Safed, Ottoman Palestine
- Jacob Curiel (1587–1664), Portuguese merchant and diplomat
- Jahacob Curiel (1687–1747), Dutch merchant and diplomat, lived in Amsterdam and Curaçao
- Jonathan Curiel (b. 1960), American journalist
- José Curiel (1937–2022), Venezuelan politician
- Juan Curiel (1690–1775), Spanish politician
- Juan Alfonso Curiel (d. 1609), Spanish professor of philosophy and theology
- Leobardo Curiel Preciado (b. 1947), Mexican politician
- Luis Curiel (1655–1724), Spanish diplomat
- Luis del Carmen Curiel (1846–1930), Mexican general during Mexican Revolution
- Marcos Curiel (b. 1974), American guitarist
- Miguel Curiel (b. 1988), Peruvian footballer
- Morris Elias Curiel (1863–1928), Venezuelan banker
- Moses Curiel (1620–1697), Portuguese merchant and diplomat
- Ochy Curiel (b. 1963), Afro–Dominican social anthropologist and activist
- Ortensia Curiel, Italian designer founder of Curiel fashion brand in 1908
- Pilar Montero Curiel (b. 1950), Mexican philologist
- Rafael Curiel Gallegos (1883–1955), Mexican politician
- Ran Curiel (b. 1949), Israeli diplomat and former Israeli Ambassador to Greece
- Raoul Curiel (1913–2000), French archaeologist and brother of Henri
- Rogelio Flores Curiel (1924–2008), Mexican general and politician
- Shayron Curiel (b. 1991), Curaçao–born Dutch footballer

Sometimes it is spelled Couriel or Curjel:

- Alberto Couriel (b. 1935), Uruguayan accountant and politician
- Hans Curjel (1896–1974), Swiss art historian
- Luzia Hartsuyker-Curjel (1926–2011), German–Dutch architect
- Robert Curjel (1859–1925), German–Swiss architect
