= Curiel de Duero =

- Nickname: Curiel
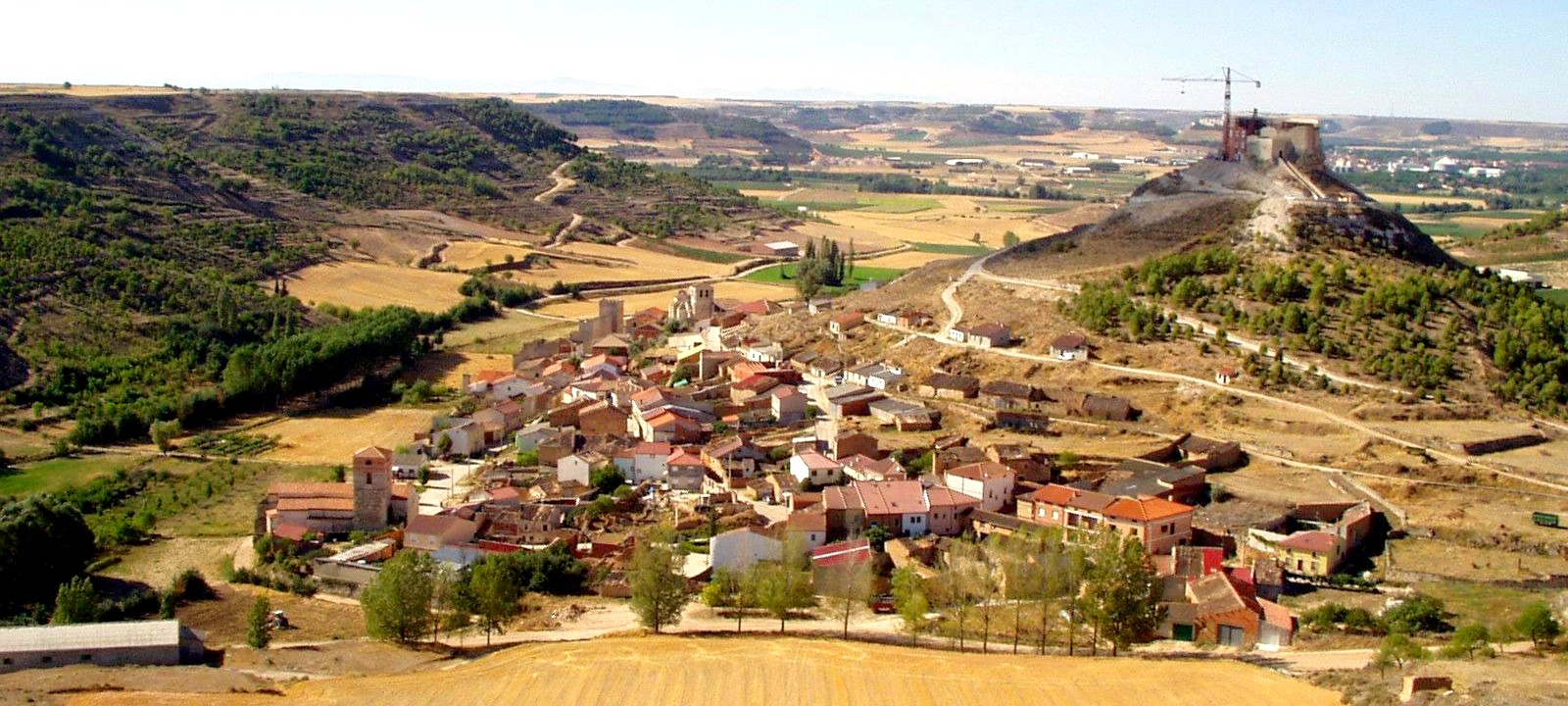

- Location in Spain
- Coordinates: 41°38′30″N 4°06′00″W
- Country: Spain
- Autonomous community: Castile and León
- Province: Valladolid
- Municipality: Curiel de Duero

Area
  - Total: 18.75 km^{2} (7.24 sq mi)
- Elevation: 798 m (2,618 ft)

Population (2025-01-01)
  - Total: 111
  - Density: 5.92/km^{2} (15.3/sq mi)
- Time zone: UTC+1 (CET)
  - Summer (DST): UTC+2 (CEST)

Curiel de Duero is a municipality located in the province of Valladolid, Castile and León, Spain. It covers an area of 18,75 km^{2}, has a population of 134 inhabitants, yielding a density of 6,93 inhabitants/km^{2}. It belongs to the Valle del Cuco and the county (Spanish: Comarca) of Campo de Peñafiel. The municipalities of San Llorente, Corrales de Duero, Valdearcos de la Vega, and Bocos de Duero also belong to the Valle del Cuco. Roturas, that borders north to Curiel De Duero, historically also belonged to Curiel, but has in modern times not been included into the Valle del Cuco county. In 1900, Curiel had its peak of 590 inhabitants.

The economy is based on agricultural dryland farming, vineyards, and domestic sheep keeping. Curiel has several wineries, belonging to the Denominación de Origen Ribera del Duero.

== History ==
Curiel was the capital (Spanish: Cabecera) of the Villa y Tierra community of Curiel in the historic autonomous community, Castilian Extremadura. It also has been known as "Curiel of the Garlics" (Spanish: Curiel de Los Ajos) due to the quality of its garlic plantations. Please refer to the Autonomous community of villa and tierra of Curiel.

Curiel de Duero has an historic connection to the Sephardi Jewish family: Curiel and various other Muslim and Sephardi families.

The castle located at Curiel is the oldest fortress in the province of Valladolid, dating from the seventh century. It was first mentioned in writing in the eleventh century.

== See also ==
- Cuisine of the province of Valladolid
