= Curiel family =

Prominent Sephardi Jewish family

Curiel קוריאל
- Jewish noble family
- Current region: Western Europe
- Origin: Curiel de Duero, Castile, Spain
- Founded: 14th century
- Titles: Knights of the royal household of Portugal and Barons
- Style: Knight
- Traditions: Judaism
- Motto: Merite

The Curiel family (Dutch: Curiël or also known as: da Costa) is a prominent Sephardi Jewish family.

Until the late 18th century, the family held diplomatic positions for the Portuguese Crown in Hamburg and Amsterdam.

== History ==
The family's origins date back to the 14th century in Curiel de Duero, Castile, Spain. Part of the Sephardic community in Spain, the Curiel family settled in Coimbra, Portugal, after the 1492 Spanish decree that ordered the expulsion of all Jews who refused conversion to Catholicism. Abraham Curiel was an eminent physician in Lisbon and ensured that his children practiced Judaism. They were ennobled in 1641 by João IV of Portugal and hold noble titles in Portugal, Spain and the Netherlands. The Curiel family has links to banking and commerce, the arts, literature and politics.

In 1647, David Curiel financed the Spanish delegation to the Peace of Westphalia. Many members of the family sponsored Hebrew scholarship and practiced Judaism, either openly or as crypto-Jews.

=== Hamburg ===
Historian Jonathan Israel wrote that in the seventeenth century, "the new Hamburg synagogue, a place of worship for some eight hundred Sephardi Jews, was filled with emblems and reminders of the Curiel family. The eternal lamp, the Ner Tamid, was provided by Jacob Curiel, as was the oil for keeping the lamp burning. And also the bimah that stood at the centre of the synagogue, the shelves which lined it being reserved for the use of Jacob and his family."

Uriel

Uriel da Costa (part of the Curiel family, aliases Uriel Acosta and Uriel Abadat), was a Portuguese born philosopher who moved with his da Costa (alias Curiel) brothers. He was betrayed by the Curiels for having a free mind and questioning the logic of the Oral tradition and was abused in front of an entire synagogue. His brothers participated in excommunicating him.

=== Amsterdam ===
Israel wrote that Moses Curiel of Amsterdam was "renowned for his wealth, the prestige he enjoyed among non-Jews (the Stadholder William III stayed at his house for three days during one of his later visits to Amsterdam), and his handsome donations to the Amsterdam Portuguese Synagogue, his name figured constantly in Dutch Jewish community life and synagogue politics for over half a century." He continues: "his opulent residence on the Nieuwe Herengracht, then called the Joden Herengracht, in Amsterdam, testified to the seigneurial grandeur of his life-style and his pretensions to leadership among the Portuguese Jewish 'nation' as the community was known in Holland."

Israel noted that Nathan Curiel possessed a "medieval illuminated Hebrew Bible of expectational beauty" which his father, Moses Curiel, had purchased from a Spanish Jew from North Africa. According to Israel, this Bible is considered 'the oldest and most venerable item possessed by Dutch Jewry.'

=== Coriell and Coryell in U.S.A. ===
Abraham Coriell lived in Middlesex County, New Jersey, U.S.A. in 1702. He and his many Coryell and CORIELL descendants descend from Jacob Curiel (alias Dom Duetre Nunes) as was proven in the Avotaynu project.

== Notable members ==
- Israel ben Meir di Curiel (1501–1573), rabbi at Safed, Ottoman Palestine
- Jacob Curiel of Coimbra (1514-1576), Portuguese merchant and pirate
- Jerónimo de Curiel (c. 1530-1578), Spanish merchant and diplomat
- Alonso de Curiel (d. 1603), Spanish merchant and diplomat, son of Diego de Curiel
- Francisco de Vitoria (1540-1592), Roman Catholic Bishop, brother of Abraham Curiel
- Abraham Curiel (1545-1609), Portuguese physician
- Juan Alfonso de Curiel (d. 1609) Professor of philosophy at the University of Salamanca, converted to Catholicism
- David Curiel (1594-1666), Portuguese merchant and diplomat
- Jacob Curiel (1587-1664), Portuguese merchant and diplomat
- Moses Curiel (1620-1697), Portuguese merchant and diplomat
- Alexandre Nunes da Costa (1655-1712), alias Selomoh Curiel, merchant and diplomat
- Luis Curiel (1655-1724), Spanish lawyer and diplomat, converted to Catholicism
- Nathan Curiel (1666-1737), diplomat and collector of antiques
- Juan Curiel (1690-1775), Spanish intellectual and founding member of the Royal Spanish Academy, son of Luis

== See also ==
- Abravanel family
- Auerbach family
- Fould family
- Rothschild family
