= Couriel =

Couriel is a surname. Notable people with the surname include:

- Alberto Couriel (born 1935), Uruguayan public accountant and politician
- John D. Couriel (born 1978), American judge

== See also ==
- Curiel
