= Mylin Torres =

American oncologist

- Born: Savannah, Georgia, US

Academic background
- Education: BSc, biology, Harvard University; MD, 2003, Stanford University School of Medicine

Academic work
- Institutions: Emory University School of Medicine

Mylin Ann Torres is an American breast cancer radiation oncologist. Torres is the Louisa and Rand Glenn Family Chair in Breast Cancer Research and director of the Glenn Family Breast Center.

== Early life and education ==
Torres was raised in Savannah, Georgia, (United States). After her best friend's mother died of cancer when she was in sixth grade, Torres was influenced to pursue a career in medicine. Following high school, Torres enrolled at Harvard University for her Bachelor's degree in biology. As an undergraduate student, Torres competed with the Harvard Crimson women's tennis team where she was voted Rookie of the Year in 1995. Upon graduating, Torres was accepted into the Stanford University School of Medicine and completed her residency in radiation oncology at the University of Texas' MD Anderson Cancer Center.

== Career ==
Following a research fellowship in Japan, Torres accepted an assistant professor position specializing in the treatment of breast cancer at Emory University School of Medicine. In this role, she was the recipient of a three-year grant from the Susan G. Komen for the Cure organization to research ways to improve the quality of life among breast cancer patients. Following this, Torres was appointed the Louisa and Rand Glenn Family Chair in Breast Cancer Research in 2016. In the same year, Torres was named the new director of the Glenn Family Breast Center following the transfer of Ruth O'Regan. In 2018, Torres was recognized with Emory's Mentorship of Junior Faculty Award.

== See also ==
- Breast cancer
- Cancer research
- Medical school
- Oncology
