= Bernardo Nuñez Garcia =

Bernardo Nuñez Garcia was a Sephardic Jewish poet active in Amsterdam during the mid-18th century. His burlesque and occasional poems have survived in manuscript form. Among them is an epithalamium composed in 1735 to commemorate the marriage of Don Isaac de Abraham Curiel and Donna Ester Alvares, as well as two pieces titled "Entremés del Pintor Cornelio" and "Entremés del Hurto de los Muertos."
