= Jahacob Curiel =

- Born: 1687; Amsterdam, Netherlands
- Died: 20 March 1747 (aged 59–60)
- Occupation: Merchant
- Family: Curiel

Don Jahacob Hisquiau Curiel (1687–20 March 1747; Hebrew name Jacob Haim, also Iacob, de Curiel, and de Abraham Curiel) was a Dutch merchant, who spent part of his life on the Dutch Caribbean island of Curaçao. He was born into a Sephardic Jewish family in Amsterdam.

== Business and philanthropy ==
Curiel traded in commodities, such as cacao, tobacco, cotton, and port wine, between Africa, the Americas, and Europe, often with partners. He was also active in the slave trade.

Curiel filled several leadership positions in the Jewish community of Curaçao. During one Hebrew calendar year, starting in 1741 and ending in 1742, Curiel served as president. He donated large sums to the building of the Curaçao synagogue, and to Hebrew and Dutch scholarship.

== Family ==
Curiel was born in Amsterdam to Abraham Curiel (1662–1708), a Dutch merchant, and Ribca Franco da Silva (1661–1691). Jahacob was the great-grandson of Jacob Curiel, after whom he was named.

Jahacob Curiel married Ribca Mendes de Gama, daughter of Isaac Mendes de Gama, in February 1722. They had eight children: Abraham, Isaac, Jeosuah, Josseph, Lea, Moseh, Sara, and Selomoh.
