= Ferdinando de Rojas =

Most Reverend Ferdinando de Rojas
- Bishop of Vigevano
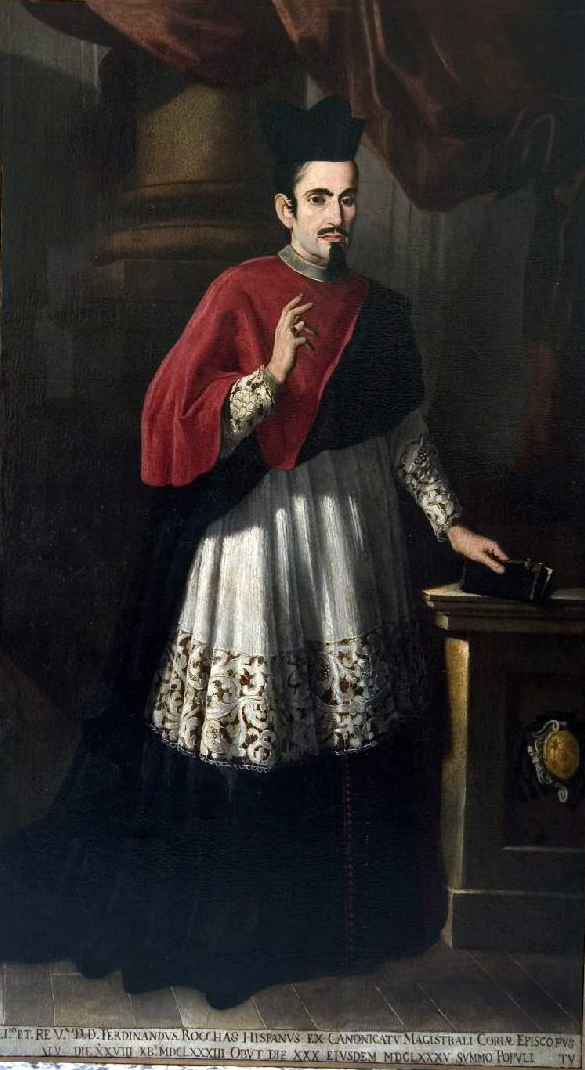
- Monsignor Ferdinando De Roxas
- Church: Catholic Church
- In office: 1683–1685
- Predecessor: Jean Caramuel y Lobkowitz
- Successor: Pier Marino Sormani

Orders
- Ordination: 1 September 1675
- Consecration: 27 December 1683 by Alessandro Crescenzi (cardinal)

Personal details
- Born: 15 April 1650 Curiel, Spain
- Died: 30 December 1685 (age 35) Vigevano, Italy

Ferdinando de Rojas or Ferdinando de Roxas (15 April 1650 – 30 December 1685) was a Roman Catholic prelate who served as Bishop of Vigevano (1683–1685).

== Biography ==
Ferdinando de Rojas was born in Curiel, Spain and ordained a priest on 1 September 1675. On 7 April 1683, he was selected as Bishop of Vigevano and confirmed by Pope Innocent XI on 20 December 1683. On 27 December 1683, he was consecrated bishop by Alessandro Crescenzi (cardinal), Cardinal-Priest of Santa Prisca, with Pier Antonio Capobianco, Bishop of Lacedonia, and Costanzo Zani, Bishop of Imola, serving as co-consecrators. He served as Bishop of Vigevano until his death on 30 December 1685.

== External links and additional sources ==
- Cheney, David M. "Diocese of Vigevano". Catholic-Hierarchy.org. (for Chronology of Bishops) ^{[self-published]}
- Chow, Gabriel. "Diocese of Vigevano". GCatholic.org. (for Chronology of Bishops) ^{[self-published]}

Catholic Church titles
Preceded by Jean Caramuel y Lobkowitz	Bishop of Vigevano; 1683–1685	Succeeded by Pier Marino Sormani
