= Mikveh Israel (disambiguation) =

Mikveh Israel (Hebrew: מקווה ישראל "Hope of Israel") is an agricultural school and village in Israel.

Mikveh Israel may also refer to:

== Synagogues ==
=== Netherlands Antilles ===
- Mikvé Israel-Emanuel, synagogue in Curaçao, Netherlands Antilles

=== United States ===
- Congregation Mickve Israel, Savannah, Georgia, United States
- Congregation Mikveh Israel, Philadelphia, United States
  - Mikveh Israel Cemetery, Philadelphia, United States
