= Alexandre Nunes da Costa =

Alexandre Nunes da Costa (1655-1712), alias Selomoh Curiel, was a Sephardi Jewish nobleman and diplomat.

Nunes Da Costa was the son of Moses Curiel, and the grandson of Jacob Curiel. In 1697, Curiel inherited his father's position as Agent to the Portuguese Crown in Amsterdam. Although 'much less active in his capacity as Agent of Portugal than his father had been', Alexandre greatly increased the family's wealth and served as de facto Portuguese ambassador to the Netherlands for a year in 1698.

With large investments in Dutch and Portuguese goods, Nunes da Costa, in 1702, financed the building of two fleets to protect his cargo. This led to tension between Portugal and the Netherlands.
