= Fernão Nunes =

Portuguese-Jewish traveler, chronicler, and horse trader

- Born: 1500 CE
- Died: 1550 (aged 49–50)
- Occupations: traveler, chronicler and horse trader
- Years active: 1535 - 1537
- Known for: Writings on the capital of the Vijayanagara Empire

Fernão Nunes, also known as Fernao Nuniz, was a Portuguese-Jewish traveler, chronicler and horse trader who spent three years in Vijayanagara, the capital of the Vijayanagara Empire in the time period 1535-1537. His writings have brought to light many interesting details about Vijayanagara at that time, including construction of massive fortification works, watch towers and security walls. From his notes it is known that the expansion of the imperial capital limits happened during the reign of emperors Bukka Raya II and Deva Raya I.

Once Nunes fled the inquisition to Constantinople in the Ottoman Empire, where he openly practiced his Judaism.

Nunes' brother was one Jacob Curiel of Coimbra, alias Duarte Nunes, founder of the Curiel family that would come to greatly influence European trade and diplomacy. Jacob and Fernão frequently wrote letters to each other.
