= Rebecca Cohen Henriquez =

Curaçaoan community worker and feminist

- 1933 dedication of Queen Wilhelmina statue in the Park of Willemstad
- Born: 9 July 1864; Willemstad, Colony of Curaçao and Dependencies, Kingdom of the Netherlands
- Died: 23 May 1935 (aged 70); Willemstad, Colony of Curaçao and Dependencies, Kingdom of the Netherlands
- Other name: Shon Beca Cohen Henriquez
- Occupation: feminist
- Years active: 1883–1933
- Known for: founding the first women's club, Entre Nous, in Curaçao

Rebecca Cohen Henriquez (9 July 1864 – 23 May 1935) was a Sephardi Jewish woman from the Colonial Dutch island of Curaçao. Based upon the custom of her community, she was unable to work and instead devoted her time to charitable activities. In 1895, she founded the first woman's club, known as Entre Nous, in the country. Besides hosting literary events, the club was responsible for the construction of the Queen Wilhelmina Park in Willemstad. She was invested as a Knight of the Order of the Liberator by Venezuela in 1902 and was invested as a Knight of the Order of Orange-Nassau in 1932.

== Early life ==
Rebecca Cohen Henriquez was born on 9 July 1864 in Willemstad in the Colony of Curaçao and Dependencies of the Dutch Empire to Esther (née Henriquez) and Salomón Cohen Henriquez. Her family, including her paternal grandparents, Esther (née Monsanto) and Daniel Cohen Henriquez, were part of the prosperous Sephardi Jewish community, which had roots in the Iberian peninsula, but had immigrated to Curaçao from Amsterdam in 1681. Her father was the Advocate General of the colony and Cohen Henriquez was his youngest child of six siblings.

Until the 1870s, education or employment for women were unacceptable under the societal norms of the times, but in the last quarter of the decade, educational facilities began offering schooling for girls. Cohen Henriquez began her schooling at the Colegio Smith and then transferred to the private girls' school, Colegio Colonial, which was operated by José R. Henriquez and his wife. The school, in which classes were taught in Spanish, offered courses in astronomy, etiquette, geography, languages (Dutch, English and French), math, religion, reading, and writing. She supplemented her education with lessons from her father in philosophy and Dutch literature.

== Activism ==
As working was unacceptable for women of her class, when Cohen Henriquez finished her schooling, she participated in charitable works, providing food and financial support to the poor. She occupied her time with painting and embroidery creating goods which could be sold at bazaars she organized to raise money to provide assistance to others. Among the many activities for social welfare she engaged in was disaster and hurricane relief.

In 1883 (or 1895) Cohen Henriquez organized fourteen alumni of Colegio Colonial, including herself and Rebecca Alvares Correa; Angela Baiz; Lelia, Leonor and Raquel Capriles; Elmire Cohen Henriquez; Anna Gravenhorst; Henriette de Leao Laguna; Habita Mendes Chumaceiro; Rosabelle and Sarah Penso; Julieta Pinedo; and Nettie van Lier into the Entre Nous Club, the first women's organization in Curaçao. Cohen Henriquez served as president of the organization from its founding until her death. All of the women except Anna Gravenhorst, who was Protestant, were from the Jewish community. Besides their social improvement projects, the ladies of the club hosted cultural events featuring literary and music recitals. In 1902, she was granted permission from the Dutch crown to accept a knighthood in the 4th degree to the Order of the Liberator from Venezuela.

The women of the club, conceived, planned, and funded the creation of the Queen Wilhelmina Park of Willemstad. An unusual undertaking, the women proved that they were able to manage and complete the project on their own initiative. Using proceeds from their programs, in which the club members and their friends performed, Entres Nous raised sufficient funds by 1899 to begin construction in the central downtown area, known as Punda, of a park to create recreational space for the residents. The plan was completed and officially opened in 1901, the first and only public park in the city and quickly became a social and cultural meeting center. Through the years, the club continued adding amenities, like benches, which were installed in 1907.

In 1930, Cohen Henriquez and the club decided to revitalize the park in honor of the fiftieth birthday of Queen Wilhelmina. Through Cohen Henriquez's dedication to the cause, they raised ƒ15,000 (fifteen thousand Antillean guilders) to commission a statue from the Florentine sculptor Pietro Ceccarelli. Cohen Henriquez was invested as a knight of the Order of Orange-Nassau in 1932, becoming the first women to ever receive the Order of Orange-Nassau in Curaçao. The statue was created in Italy and shipped to Curaçao arriving on 29 December 1932. The statue, made of Carrara marble stood two and a half meters above the 3.5 meter pedestal and was unveiled during a ceremony held on 19 January 1933.

== Death and legacy ==
Cohen Henriquez died on 23 May 1935 in Willemstad. A marble plaque was erected in Queen Wilhelmina Park to memorialize her contributions to the creation of the park and her community service.
