= Mordechai HaKohen of Safed =

Safed-based scholar and kabbalist (1523–1598)

Mordechai HaKohen of Safed (Hebrew: מרדכי הכהן; 1523–1598) was a scholar and kabbalist who flourished in the second half of the sixteenth century in Safed. He was a pupil of the famous kabbalist Israel di Curiel, and a contemporary of Joseph di Trani. Mordechai wrote an allegoric-kabalistic commentary on the Pentateuch, entitled Sifte Kohen. He had to leave Safed due to financial hardships and took up the position of rabbi of Aleppo, Syria in 1570.
