= David Curiel =

Portuguese Jewish merchant in Amsterdam

Don David Curiel
- Born: 11 May 1594; Lisbon
- Died: 4 October 1666 (aged 72); Rotterdam
- Noble family: Curiel
- Father: Abraham Curiel
- Mother: Maria de Fonseca
- Occupation: merchant, diplomat

Don David Curiel (11 May 1594 – 4 October 1666), alias Lopo da Fonseca Ramires, was a Sephardi Jewish merchant.

== Early life and education ==
David Curiel was the son of Abraham Curiel and the brother of Jacob Curiel. He was sent to Heidelberg University in Heidelberg, Germany.

== Diplomatic career ==
In Amsterdam, David Curiel served as Agent to the Spanish Crown as well as being engaged in the import business of jewellery and gunpowder across Europe. He was a financier of the Spanish delegation at the Peace of Westphalia.

Curiel was perhaps the most prominent member of Amsterdam's Sephardi community and was a generous patron of Hebrew scholarship.

Whilst in Amsterdam, Curiel was attacked by a robber, recognising who he was, and 'seriously wounded him with a knife'. Curiel pursued his attacker, with the help of his neighbours. The man was 'arrested, tried, and executed', and Curiel received a letter of apology from the Stadholder of the Netherlands.

== Family ==
Curiel had two sons born in the Netherlands. Samuel in 1655 and Isaac in 1659. He insisted that his sons be circumcised in accordance with Jewish law and is even said to have refrained from attending the stock exchange on the Sabbath.

== Books ==
- In 1994, the British historian Jonathan Israel wrote a book charting the life of David Curiel, Lopo Ramirez (David Curiel) and the Attempt to Establish a Sephardi Community in Antwerp in 1653–1654.
