= History of the Jews in Curaçao =

The history of the Jews in Curaçao (a constituent country of the Kingdom of the Netherlands) can be traced back to the mid-17th century, when the first Jewish immigrants began to arrive. The first Jews in Curaçao were Sephardi Jewish immigrants from the Netherlands, Portugal, and Spain. These immigrants founded Congregation Mikvé Israel-Emanuel, the oldest continuously used synagogue in the Americas. The first Jew to settle in Curaçao was a Dutch-Jewish interpreter named Samuel Cohen, who arrived on board a Dutch fleet in 1634. By the mid-1700s, the community was the most prosperous in the Americas and many of the Jewish communities in Latin America, primarily in Colombia and Venezuela, resulted from the influx of Curaçaoan Jews.

In the 20th century Ashkenazi Jews from Eastern Europe immigrated to Curaçao, establishing their own traditions and a school. As of 2026, the Jewish population is less than 350.

== History ==
In 1492, the Jews of Spain, after years of persecution and forced conversion to Catholicism, were expelled en masse. Initially, they sought refuge in nearby Portugal but eventually spread throughout Europe into other places with larger Jewish populations, like Belgium, Greece, Italy, Turkey, and Holland. So many of the Sephardic Jews from Spain and Portugal had settled in Amsterdam, that by the year 1700, the city's community was the largest Jewish center in Western Europe. When the Dutch West India Company began efforts to exploit the resources of the Americas and was placed in charge of colonizing, the Sephardim became involved as translators and traders. The Dutch first moved into the previously Portuguese-led colonies in Brazil and then expanded to other Portuguese and Spanish colonies in the Caribbean.

=== Early settlement ===
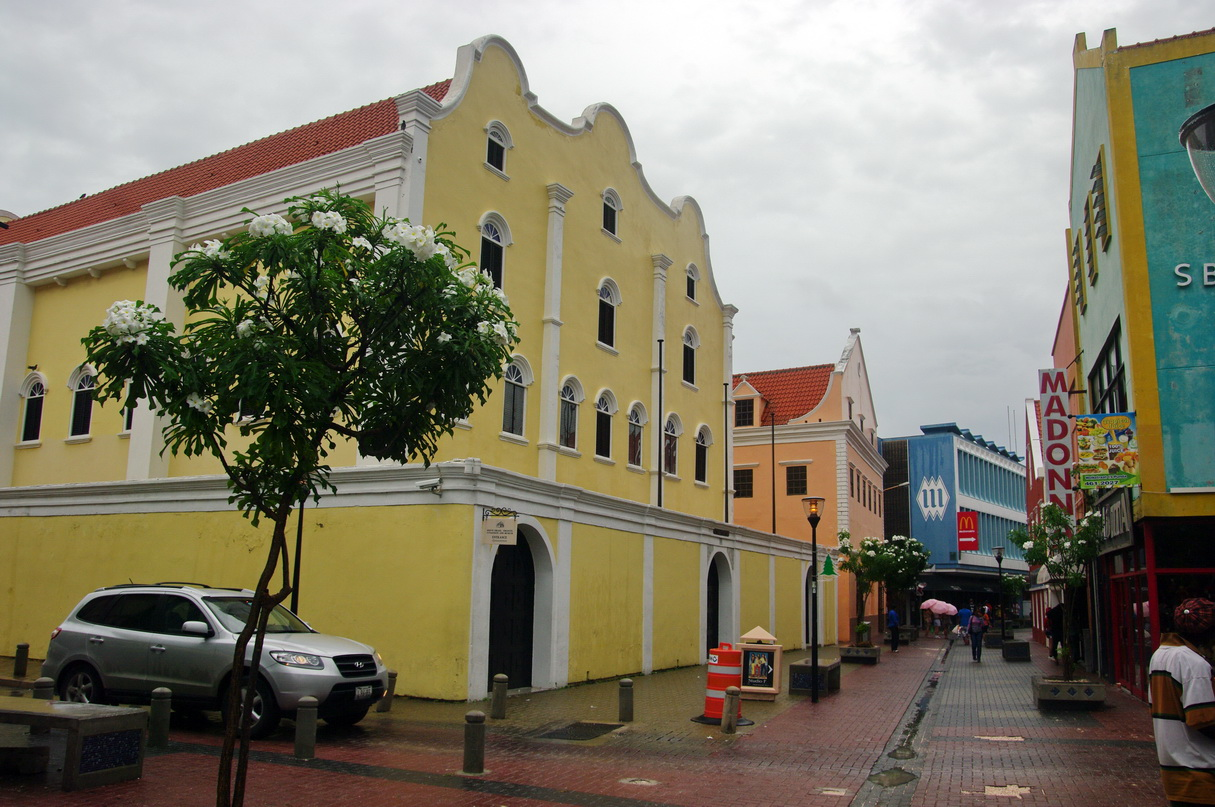
The Mikvé Israel-Emanuel Synagogue, in Willemstad, Curaçao. Completed in 1674

In 1634, the Dutch overthrew the Spanish on the island of Curaçao and migration followed. The first Jew on the island, Samuel Cohen, was part of the conquering fleet and had served as an interpreter to Dutch commander Johannes van Walbeeck. The first Sephardim began arriving in the 1650s, when Joao d’Ylan led around a dozen Jewish families to establish the Plantation De Hoop (Plantation of Hope) in 1651. A group of Portuguese Jews fleeing the Inquisition in Brazil established themselves in Curaçao in 1654. Granted a two-mile strip of land along the coast by the West India Company, these settlers established the community of Mikve Israel with the plan of farming. They were joined by a group of around seventy colonists arriving in 1659, under the patronage of Isaac da Costa, who brought with them a Torah scroll, as a gift from the Jewish congregation of Amsterdam. That same year, the first cemetery Beth Haim was consecrated, which is probably the oldest Jewish cemetery in the Americas. Jacob Lopez de Fonseca, who was born on the island, became the first Chief Rabbi, and Aharon Mendes Chumaceiro from Holland was the second Chief Rabbi.

Within a generation, the settlers turned to shipping and trading, as soil conditions on the island were unfavorable to farming. Unable to grow their own food, colonists began trading with nearby Spanish colonies in Colombia and Venezuela. Their interests spread to banking and commerce, importing goods like cloth, tools, utensils and weapons from relatives in Europe and exchanging or selling them to obtain foodstuffs, hides, tobacco and wood from other colonies. The change in their employment, also brought about a relocation of the community into the walled city of Willemstad with its easy access to the harbor. Utilizing architectural styles with which they were familiar, these merchants built homes similar to those they had left in Amsterdam, which had living quarters on the upper floors and warehouses for their goods on the lower levels. Their success led to them lending support to other Sephardic communities in North and South America.

By 1674, so much of the population had migrated to Willemstad that a house was converted to serve as a congregational meeting place. The same year marked the arrival of the community's first qualified rabbi; Josiau de David Pardo, a Dutch emigrant and son-in-law of the Torah scholar Saul Levi Morteira. Outgrowing the original establishment, in 1690, the Jewish community acquired a new house for worship, which was replaced by a proper synagogue in 1703. A portion of the Jewish population emigrated to Newport, Rhode Island in 1694; historian Max J. Kohler surmised that this was because the Curaçao settlement had proved "unsuccessful" for some families, despite its religious and civil freedoms.

The community also established a significant export trade in textiles and plantation equipment, and set up the island's first trade routes to Venezuela for the purchase of cacao. Phelipe Henriquez (1660-1718), a Jewish trader who oversaw transshipment of more than three thousand slaves via Curaçao to Cartagena between 1680 and 1701. (Note: Henriquez' slaving business was destroyed in 1702 during the War of the Spanish Succession, when he declared himself a supporter of the Archduke Charles for the Spanish throne, while Cartagenan authorities endorsed the rival claim of Phillip of Anjou. He was arrested in Cartagena on allegations of arms trading; a charge that was later extended to an accusation before the Spanish Inquisition that he had committed sacrilege by performing Jewish rituals. Henriquez' Portuguese employer paid for his release before trial on either matter; he died in Cuba in 1718.) Despite these commercial endeavours, Jewish families remained somewhat poorer than their Dutch Protestant counterparts. Tax records from 1702 and 1707 group the entire Jewish population in the bottom half of incomes, with 60 percent of families in the lowest tax bracket compared with 50 percent of Protestants.

=== Eighteenth century ===
Growth in the city continued, and as space became scarce within the city walls, Otrobanda became populated with less affluent Jews, who could not afford the higher rents in Willemstad. In 1732, the second synagogue of the Mikve Israel community was built. The congregation had many unique customs and rituals such as a special black Tallit worn on Tisha B'Av by their rabbi, requiring someone reading from the Book of Lamentations to wear black shoes and use a black yad, and marking the platter at a wedding ceremony by throwing a wine glass at a platter. The building was a smaller version of the Portuguese Synagogue of Amsterdam and is the oldest synagogue in existence in the Americas. For the Jews of Otrobanda, a problem arose, in that crossing the harbor to attend services was a breach in the prohibition of working on the Sabbath; thus, in 1746 another synagogue, Neve Shalom, was built as a de facto satellite of Mikve Israel. By 1746, the community was the largest Jewish population in the Americas, containing 270 families. It peaked two years later at 280 families, or around 1500 people, with membership supporting Holy Land Jewish institutions and other communities liberally.

Throughout the century Jewish families established a strong foothold in trade and ship-owning, (Note: The influence of Jewish traders on ship-building is evident in the names given to many Curaçao-built craft during the eighteenth century, including the schooners Masaltob, Abraham en Isaac, Bathseba and Bekeerde Jood.) and were the mainstay of insurance and brokerage. In 1734, 39 out of 44 insurers in Curaçao were Jewish; by the 1790s there were 17 Jews among the island's 25 trade brokers. In the early eighteenth century a Jewish merchant, Daniel Cohen Henriquez, also occupied a central position as the sorter of tobacco grades prior to its export to Amsterdam.

By 1785 about forty percent, or 1200, of the island's white population was Jewish. When the French Revolution occurred, anti-monarchists in Holland, moved against William V, Prince of Orange, forcing him to abdicate. The French established an agent in Curaçao forcing many in the Jewish community who supported William V, to supply their ships and give preferential treatment to French commerce and goods. Introducing an antisemitism previously unknown on the island, the French sent a squadron from Guadeloupe to occupy Curaçao. The island inhabitants raised a National Guard, including Jewish officers Haim Abinun de Lima, Raphael Alvares Correa and Abraham Shalom Delvalle, which repelled the invasion. Under the pretext of helping the islanders, the British then invaded in 1800. Though the Jewish leadership resisted, the British maintained a foothold until 1816. While the British were unable to interfere with the religious life of the community, their occupation created economic upheaval in Curaçao.

By the end of the century, more than half of the white population of Curaçao was Jewish. Originally, they primarily spoke Portuguese, but over time many adopted Papiamentu, incorporating Portuguese and Hebrew loanwords into the local Creole language.

=== Nineteenth century ===
Simon Bolivar visited the island in 1812, when it was still under British rule. He took refuge within the Jewish community in Otrobanda and was able to cultivate support for his independence movement through the mutual disdain for Spanish rule, which he shared with the Curaçaoan Jews. Bolivar inspired such men as David Haim de Moshe Lopez Penha, who served as a colonel; Benjamin Henriques, who became a captain in the cavalry; and Juan de Sola, who commanded the cavalry at the Battle of Carabobo in 1821 to join his fight for independence of Latin America. By the time the Dutch regained possession of the island in 1816, the Jewish population had decreased by fifteen percent. In addition, the sex ratio was skewed because of the economic situation. As men were unable to attain employment, they left the island, relocating to Danish held St. Thomas or to Latin America where countries were beginning to gain their independence and overturn the Inquisition laws. As orthodox women were not allowed to travel without a male chaperone, few Jewish women left Curaçao during the same period men were migrating away. Growth in Latin American Jewish communities, primarily in Colombia and Venezuela, resulted from the influx of Curaçaoan Jews.

The out-migration of young Jewish men created a lack of available husbands for the Jewish women of Curaçao. Unable to travel, or marry outside their faith, a new group of single dependent women emerged on the island. Migrating Jewish men, on the other hand, often married gentile women in their new place of residence and abandoned their faith. The Jews who remained in Curaçao married within their community, as did those who migrated to places where other Jewish communities existed, such as St. Thomas. However, because women far outnumbered men in the community by the middle of the century, only fifty-two percent of the Jewish women in Curaçao married. Though a brief pogrom in Coro, Venezuela and a hurricane in St. Thomas brought an influx of immigrants in the period of 1855 to 1867, most of those immigrants left Curaçao after normalcy was restored.

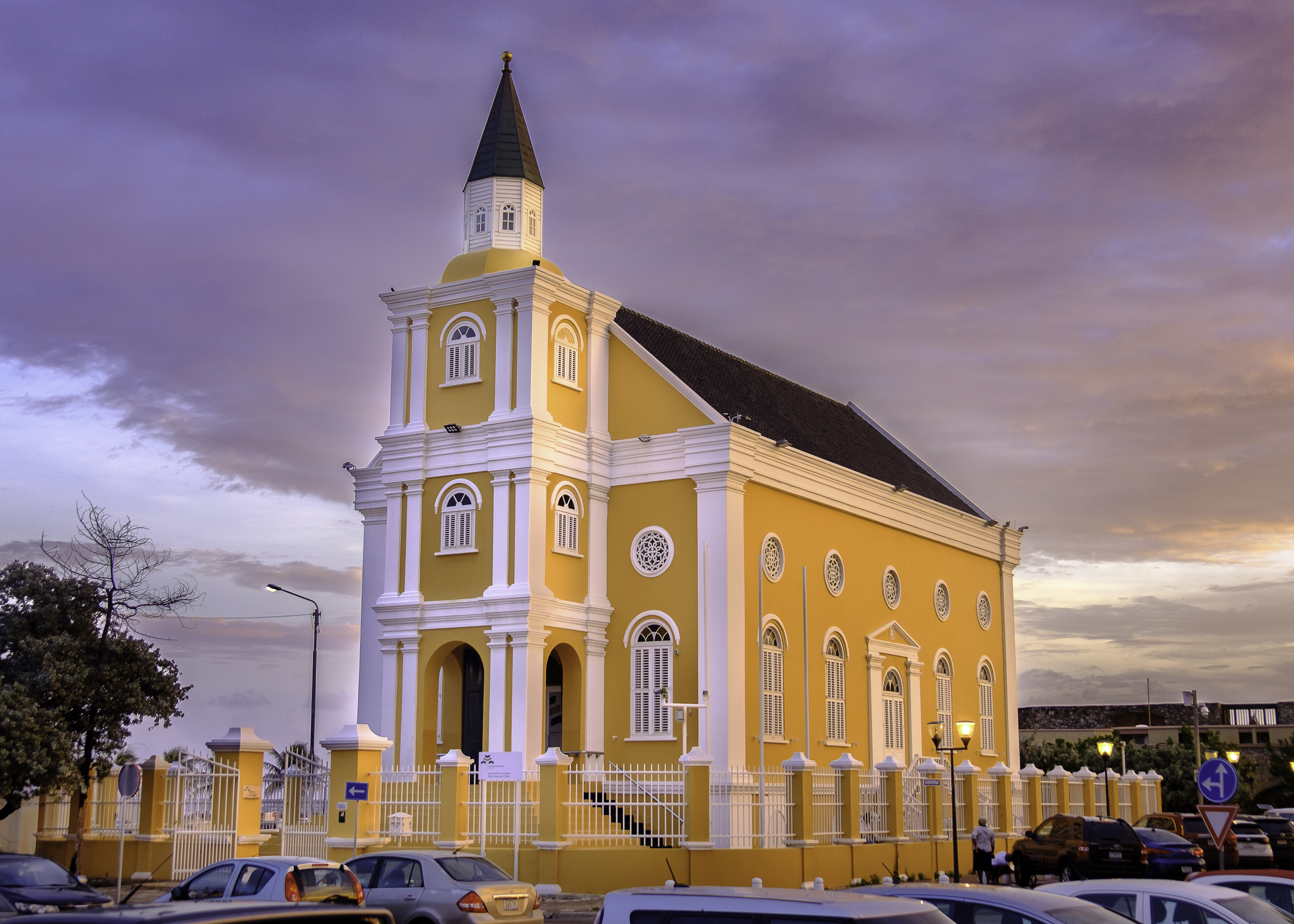
Temple Emanuel, in Willemstad, Curaçao. Completed in 1867

In 1864, about one-third of the Curaçaoan Jewish population broke from the orthodox tradition and built a new synagogue, Temple Emanuel, which adhered to the principles of the Reform Jewish Movement. They also consecrated at cemetery at Berg Altena.

By the 1870s, Jewish women's education was becoming increasingly important in Curaçao. Many Sephardic women attended Colegio Colonial, a school directed by José R. Henriquez and his wife, where they learned arithmetic, astronomy, etiquette, general religion, geography, languages, reading and writing, along with students from Colombia, the Dominican Republic and Venezuela. These educated women who had little job opportunities, turned their attentions toward charitable social projects. One such project was spearheaded by Rebecca Cohen Henriquez, who led the members of "Club Entre Nous" to build Queen Wilhelmina Park in 1899.

== Twentieth century ==
In 1926 a group of Ashkenazi Jews, primarily from Romania, settled in Curaçao. These Eastern European Jews, from the historic area of Bessarabia, were not originally heading for the Caribbean. Quotas in the United States after World War I, diverted many populations of immigrants to Latin America; however, as ships stopped in Curaçao, some of the immigrants stayed, finding it peaceful. The initial migrants were men, who found brides either from their homelands, or from nearby communities in Colombia and Venezuela. Many were artisans or peddlers and in the beginning of their settlement, they purchased goods from Sephardic wholesalers, which they then peddled throughout rural areas of the island.

On May 10, 1940, the Curaçaoan government authorities confiscated all German ships in response to the German invasion of the Netherlands. An internment camp was established in neighboring Bonaire for the crews, of nearly 500 men and others deemed to be enemies of the state, who were detained until the war ended. A monument was erected to honor Antilleans who died during World War II, listing 162 names. One of these, George Maduro, served as a reserve officer in the Dutch army, joined the resistance after the Dutch surrendered, and assisted downed Allied pilots in their escape, before being arrested and killed at Dachau. Madurodam, a park in The Hague was constructed to honor his life.

=== "Curaçao visas" ===
During World War II, Curaçao played an indirect role in the rescue of Jews from Nazi-occupied Lithuania. In July 1940, following the Soviet takeover of the Baltic States, Nathan Gutwirth, a Dutch citizen studying at the Telshe yeshiva, sought a way to leave Lithuania in the absence of diplomatic relations between the Soviet Union and Holland. Gutwirth asked the Dutch ambassador to Lithuania, L.P.J. de Dekker, for a visa to the Dutch colony of Curaçao, from where he hoped to continue on to the United States. de Dekker informed him that Curaçao did not require any entry visa for citizens or non-citizens, only a landing permit signed by the governor. Recognizing this as a way to help other Jews escape Lithuania, de Dekker instructed all Dutch consuls to stamp any passport or identity paper belonging to any refugee with the statement:

The Dutch Royal Legation in Riga hereby declares that no visa is required for entrance by foreigners to Surinam, Curaçao and the other Dutch possessions in America

leaving out the part about the landing permit.

Rabbi Zerach Warhaftig, a Polish Zionist leader, heard about the scheme and arranged with the temporary Dutch consul in Kaunas, businessman Jan Zwartendijk, to issue "Curaçao visas" to anyone who requested them. Without receiving permission from the Dutch diplomatic mission in Riga, Zwartendijk issued 2,200 Curaçao visas between July 24 and August 2, 1940, the day before his office was closed by the Soviets.

While the Soviets agreed to honor the Curaçao visas, they insisted that the visa holders also have a transit visa to a country outside Russia. At this point the Japanese consul in Kaunas came into the picture. Chiune Sugihara had been seeking a way to help Lithuanian Jews escape to Japan under the Fugu Plan. Sugihara worked in conjunction with Zwartendijk to issue 2,200 transit visas to Japan, with Curaçao as the final destination. With these visas, Jews were able to obtain exit visas from the Soviet government and take the Trans-Siberian Railway to Vladivostok, destination Kobe, Japan. It is believed that none of the visa holders actually reached Curaçao. In the archived papers of Anatole Ponevejsky, the head of the Kobe Jewish community in 1940–1941, however, a bar graph ("Emigration from Japan, Countries of destination, July 1940–November 1941") shows that 5 emigrants had a destination of the Netherlands Indies.

=== Postwar ===
In 1964, Mikve Israel and Temple Emanuel's congregations merged agreeing to follow the rituals of the Reconstructionist Jewish Movement in an effort to preserve the traditions of both congregations. In the late 1960s, some of the Ashkenazi Jews left after they became targets of rioting. Others left in the 1980s, when economic recession and the devaluation of the Venezuelan currency made migration to the United States more attractive.

Approximately 350 Jews remain in Curaçao. They maintain the Jewish Cultural Historical Museum, which is connected to the Mikve Israel-Emanuel synagogue. The museum contains religious artifacts including a 1729 mikvah and eighteen historic Torahs. The community also operates a combined school, the Community Hebrew School, which is operated by both congregations, Mikvé Israel-Emanuel and Sharei Tsedek. Since 2017, Shaarei Tsedek has been led by a Chabad rabbi, serving the local Jewish community and tourists. The synagogue is open for weekly services and hosts a variety of activities, such as Shabbat dinners, holiday services, and educational classes.
