= John Barnes (monk) =

English Benedictine monk

John Barnes (died 1661), was an English Benedictine monk.

== Life ==
Barnes was a Lancashire man by extraction, if not by birth. He was educated at the University of Oxford, but after being converted to the Church of Rome he went to Spain and studied divinity in the University of Salamanca under Juan Alfonso Curiel, who "was wont to call Barnes by the name of John Huss, because of a spirit of contradiction which was always observed in him". Having resolved to join the Spanish congregation of the Order of St Benedict, he was clothed in St Benedict's monastery at Valladolid on 12 March 1604; was professed the next year on 21 March; and was ordained priest 20 September 1608. He was subsequently stationed at Douai and St Malo; and in 1613 the general chapter in Spain nominated him first assistant of the English mission. After he had laboured in this country for some time, he was apprehended and banished into Normandy with several other priests. Invited to the English priory at Dieulwart, in Lorraine, he read a divinity lecture there, and he was next similarly employed in Marchienne College at Douai.

Venturing again into England, Barnes resided privately at Oxford in 1627 for the purpose of collecting, in the Bodleian Library, materials for some works which he intended to publish. At this period his brethren regarded him with grave suspicion. He was an enemy to the pope's temporal power; he had attacked the teaching of certain casuists on the subject of equivocation; he had affirmed that prior to the Reformation there never existed any congregation of Benedictines in England, excepting that of the Cluny order; and he had, with Father Francis Walgrave, opposed the coalition in this country of the monks belonging respectively to the Spanish, Italian (Cassinese), and English congregations. Wood relates that his writings "made him so much hated by those of his order that endeavours were made to seize upon him and make him an example". Barnes, perceiving the danger, fled to Paris, and there placed himself under the protection of the Spanish ambassador. In consequence, however, of the efforts made by Father Clement Reyner and his interest with Albert of Austria, Barnes was carried from Paris by force, was divested of his habit, tied to a horse and hurried away into Flanders (preface to Catholico-Romanus Pacificus). The securing of Father Barnes cost the order £300. According to Wood he was conveyed from Flanders to Rome, where, by command of the pope, he was, as a contriver of new doctrine, thrust into a dungeon of the Inquisition. His mind giving way, he was removed to a lunatic asylum behind the church of St Paul the Less, and he appears to have been confined there until his death, which occurred in August 1661. "If he was in his wits", wrote Father Leander Norminton from Rome, "he was an heretic; but they gave him Christian burial because they accounted him rather a madman".

By the reformed party Barnes is described as the good Irenæus, a learned, peaceable, and moderate man; but catholic writers, particularly of his own order, condemn his conduct in the severest terms. For example, Dom Bennet Weldon says: "I have gathered many letters which show him to have tampered much with the state of England to become its pensioner, to mince the catholic truths that the protestants might digest them without choking, and so likewise to prepare the protestant errors that catholic stomachs might not loathe them. He was hard at work in the prosecution of this admirable project in the years 1625 and 1626. He took upon him in a letter to a nobleman of England, which is without date of year or month, to maintain out of true divinity the separation of England from the court of Rome as things then stood, and the oath of fidelity of the English communion, to be lawful and just according to the writers of the Roman church. And he says at the beginning of this wonderful letter, that he had been about eight years at work to get an opportunity of insinuating himself into his majesty's knowledge".

== Works ==
Barnes wrote the following works:

- Examen Trophæorum Congregationis Prætensæ Anglicanæ Ordinis S. Benedicti Rheims, 1622, 8vo. It is a reply to Father Edward Mayhew's Congregationis Anglicanæ Ordinis S. Benedicti Trophæa, Rheims, 1619. An answer to Barnes is found in some copies of Reyner's Apostolatus Benedictinorum in Angliâ but without a name to it or any mention of Barnes.
- Dissertatio contra Æquivocationes, Paris, 1625, 8vo. He attacks the arguments of Parsons and Lessius.
- The Spiritual Combat Translated into Latin from the Spanish of John Castaniza
- Catholico-Romanus Pacificus, Oxford, 1680
