= Nathan Curiel =

Portuguese politician and noble

Don Nathan Curiel
- Born: 1666
- Died: 1737 (aged 70–71)
- Noble family: Curiel
- Father: Moses Curiel

Nathan Curiel (1666-1737), alias Alvaro Nunes da Costa, was a member of the Curiel family and Agent of the Portuguese Crown in Amsterdam.

Curiel was born to Moses Curiel and Ribca Curiel (née Abas). There is speculation that he was named Nathan after Nathan of Gaza, a notable Jewish theologian who was still alive at the time of Nathan Curiel's birth.

Curiel had an early interest in botany and sponsored exploration to discover new flowers in the Far East. He introduced many new varieties of plants to the Portuguese Court. Curiel had a large gardens at his home in Amsterdam. Jonathan Israel wrote, 'The effort which went into cultivating fine gardens, we may conclude, was yet another means of seizing the attention of visiting envoys and aristocrats.'

Israel notes that Curiel possessed a 'medieval illuminated Hebrew Bible of expectational beauty' which his father, Moses Curiel, had purchased from a Spanish Jew from North Africa. According to Israel, this Bible is considered 'the oldest and most venerable item possessed by Dutch Jewry.'
