= Morris Elias Curiel =

Venezuelan banker

Morris Elias Curiel (1863-1928) was a Venezuelan banker and member of the Government of Curaçao. He liked to write poetry in his spare time. In 1998, his son Elias Morris Curiel donated the finances to transform the Center for Sephardic Studies in Caracas into the Sephardi Museum Morris E. Curiel, in his father's name. His cousin Elias David Curiel wrote the anthem of the state of Falćon.
