= Evangeline Papageorge =

American biochemist

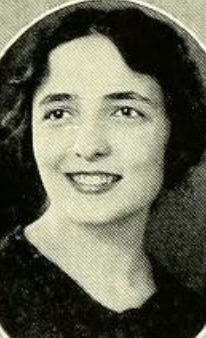
- Evangeline Papageorge, from the 1927 yearbook of Agnes Scott College
- Born: December 1, 1906; Istanbul, Turkey
- Died: September 15, 2001 (age 94); Atlanta, Georgia, U.S.
- Occupation(s): Biochemist, college professor

Evangeline Thomas Papageorge (December 1, 1906 – September 15, 2001) was an American biochemist and college professor, born in Istanbul. She was the first woman to hold a full-time appointment on the faculty of the Emory University School of Medicine, and later served as the school's dean of students.

== Early life and education ==
Papageorge was born in Istanbul, the daughter of Tomas Papageorgiou and Maria Hatzidemetriou. Her father was a Greek Orthodox priest. She moved to the United States in 1910 with her family, settling first in New Jersey and later in Georgia. Her father died in 1927. She earned a degree in chemistry from Agnes Scott College in 1927, a master's degree from Emory University in 1929, and a Ph.D. in biochemistry from the University of Michigan in 1937. Her dissertation was titled "Studies in the intermediary metabolism of phenylalanine."

== Career ==
Papageorge taught chemistry at Emory University School of Medicine from 1929 to 1956, and was the school's first full-time female faculty member. She was also the school's first female administrator, as the dean of students from 1956 until she retired in 1975. "I represent a mother figure to the students," she explained of her administrative work in the 1960s. "They feel freer to talk to me about things that matter."

Papageorge was named "Atlanta Woman of the Year in Education" for 1952. In 1966 she received the Thomas Jefferson Award from Emory. She received the Emory Medical Alumni Association's Award of Honor in 1971. A scholarship was established in her name in 1975, and the Emory Medical Alumni Association established the Evangeline Papageorge Distinguished Teaching Award in 1993, in tribute to her career.

Papageorge acted with the Emory Players, and was the first woman president of the parish council at the Greek Orthodox Cathedral of the Annunciation in Atlanta.

== Publications ==
Papageorge's research on vitamins was published in academic journals including Science, Experimental Biology and Medicine, Academic Medicine, The Journal of Nutrition, The Journal of Biological Chemistry, The American Journal of Medical Technology, and Endocrinology.

- "Excretion of Homogentisic Acid After Oral Administration of Phenylalanine to Alcaptonuric Subjects" (1938, with Moses M. Fröhlich and Howard Bishop Lewis)
- "An Experiment in Teaching Freshman Medical Students" (1945, with John H. Venable)
- "A Study of the Fasting-Hour Excretion of Thiamine in the Urine of Normal Subjects: One Figure" (1947, with George T. Lewis)
- "Fluorophotometric Determination of Rutin and Other Flavones" (1947, with Anthony J. Glazko, Foster Adair, and George T. Lewis)
- "The Effect of Oral Administration of Rutin on Blood, Liver and Adrenal Ascorbic Acid and on Liver and Adrenal Cholesterol in Guinea Pigs" (1949, with George Lee Mitchell Jr.)
- "Effect of hyperinsulinism on brain phospholipide" (1951, with Eva C. McGhee, Walter Lyon Bloom, and George T. Lewis)
- "Adrenal glycogen in the guinea pig and in the white rat" (1955, with N. L. Noble)
- "Loss of adrenal glycogen in the rat following stress or treatment with various hormones" (1955, with N. L. Noble)
- "Determination of blood cholesterol" (1955)

== Personal life ==
Papageorge lived with her sister Calomira "Callie" C. Canaris, a medical technologist, for many years. She died from lymphatic leukemia in 2001, at the age of 94, in Atlanta.
