= Jerónimo de Curiel =

Spanish diplomat

Jerónimo de Curiel (c. 1530 – 2 September 1578), or Géronimo de Curiel, was a Spanish merchant and courtier. Curiel was noted for his influence in European diplomacy and mercantile activity from the late 1550s.

== Diplomatic career ==
Curiel was born into the prominent Curiel family, who held diplomatic positions across central Europe. He was the uncle of Alonso de Curiel through bis brother Diego de Curiel, who was also an influential merchant. Curiel started his career between Madrid and Brussels, furthering trade for the Spanish Empire. In 1560, he was appointed Agent of Felipe II of Spain in Antwerp, the Netherlands. Curiel's influence reached its height under Margaret of Parma, who recommended that Curiel be created the King's head of the Treasury in 1567.

With the arrival of the Duke of Alba in Flanders, Curiel saw his position diminish as the Duke forced out those with whom he disagreed. In 1569, Curiel and Francisco de Ibarra attempted to tarnish the Duke's reputation in a report for the King. Whilst the report was being reviewed, Curiel was stabbed at night, surviving after an intensive recovery. Curiel left Flanders to serve as the King's Agent in Paris, with little of the great influence that he had enjoyed in the Netherlands. In Paris, Curiel strengthened relations between Spain and France.
