= Abraham Curiel =

Portuguese physician

Dr Abraham Curiel
- Born: 1545
- Died: 1609 (aged 63–64)
- Noble family: Curiel
- Spouse: Sara Curiel
- Issue: David; Jacob

Abraham Curiel (1545-1609), alias Jeronimo Nunes Ramires, was a physician and the son of the wealthy merchant Jacob Curiel of Coimbra. Curiel is described in several sources as "one of the greatest doctors of his time."

== Education ==
Abraham Curiel was born to Jacob Curiel of Coimbra and was sent to be educated at the University of Coimbra in Coimbra, Portugal between 1562 and 1570.

== Curiel family ==
He wed Sara Curiel, alias Maria de Fonseca, with whom he fathered 11 children, including Jacob Curiel and David Curiel. His brother was Francisco de Vitoria, a Bishop in the Catholic Church. He was an eminent Portuguese physician and shortly after his death Sara fled the Lisbon inquisition to Madrid, Spain.

== Medical work ==
Curiel qualified as a doctor of medicine in 1567 and remained at the University of Coimbra for further studies in medicine. In 1987, British historian Jonathan Israel wrote "Dr Jeronimo Nunes Ramires himself showed much less zest for travel than most of his brothers and is mainly noted for his long Latin treatise on blood-letting." This "360-page Latin treatise on blood-letting" was "inspired in a large part by Galen, the De Ratione Curandi per Sanguinis."
