= Emory University School of Medicine =

Medical school in Atlanta, Georgia, US

Coordinates: 33.793888°N 84.322069°W

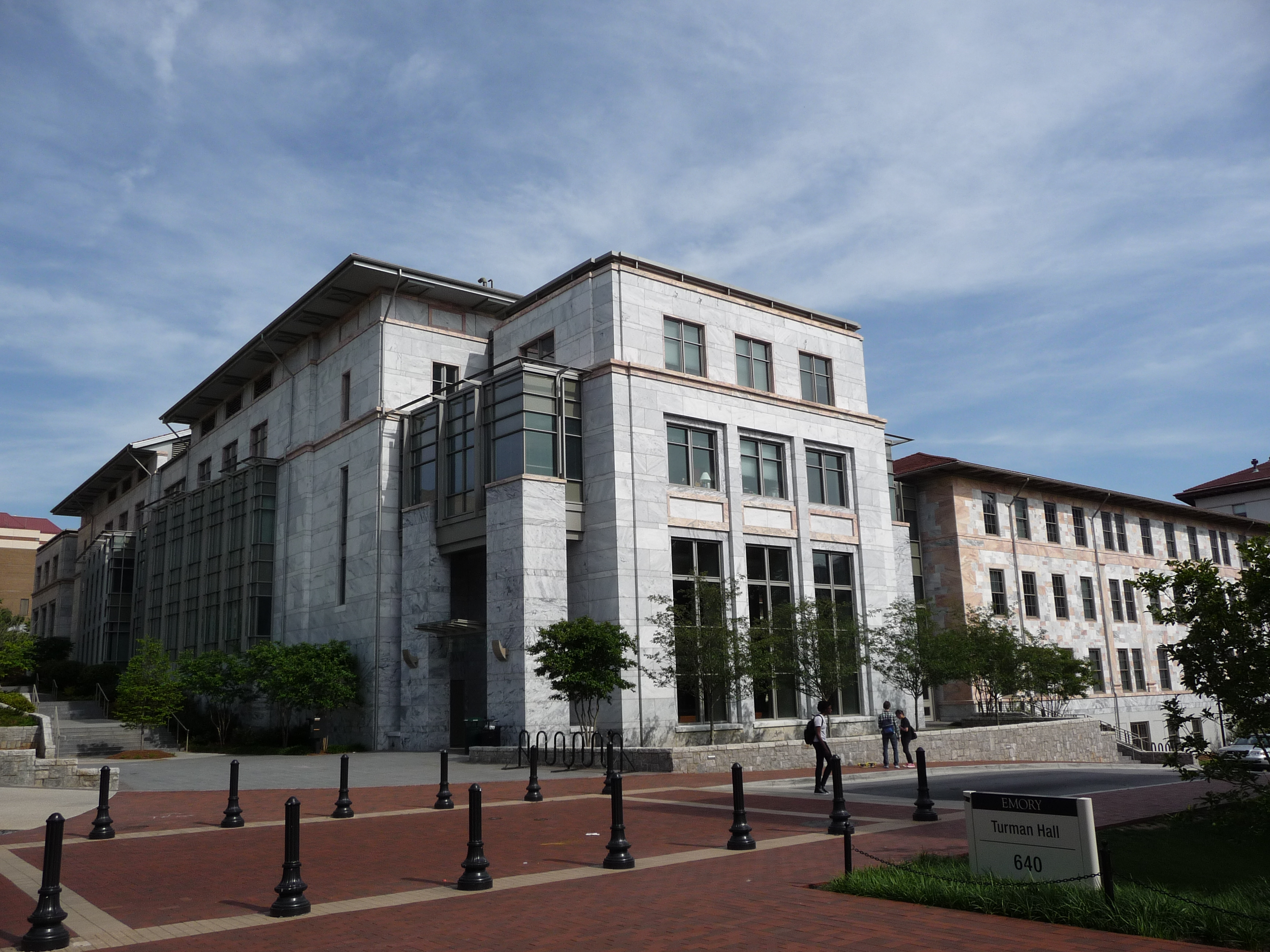
- Type: Private
- Established: 1854 (as Atlanta Medical College); 1915 (as Emory University School of Medicine)
- Dean: Sandra L. Wong, MD, MS
- Students: 455
- Location: Atlanta, Georgia, US
- Campus: Suburban
- Website: http://med.emory.edu/
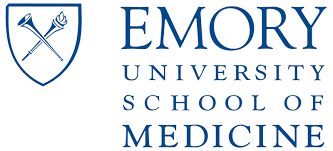

The Emory University School of Medicine is the graduate medical school of Emory University and a component of Emory’s Robert W. Woodruff Health Sciences Center. Emory University School of Medicine traces its origins back to 1915 when the Atlanta Medical College (founded 1854), the Southern Medical College (1878), and the Atlanta School of Medicine (founded 1905) merged.

Emory University School of Medicine is located on the university's main campus in the Druid Hills neighborhood of Atlanta, Georgia. The medical school offers a full-time Doctor of Medicine degree program, Masters programs in Anesthesiology and Genetic Counseling, degrees in Physical Therapy and Physician Assistant training, joint degree programs with other Emory graduate divisions, graduate medical education, and continuing medical education.

== History ==
Before it was established as the Emory School of Medicine in 1915, the school first began as the Atlanta Medical College. Founded in 1854 by a group of physicians led by Dr. John G. Westmoreland, the college began during unfavorable financial conditions along with competition of three other medical schools opening in the state, driving up competition for students. Despite these challenges, the Atlanta Medical College continued operation until August 1861 when classes were suspended due to the Civil War. Several years later, the College merged with the Southern Medical College, leading to the creation of the Atlanta College of Physicians and Surgeons in 1898.

The College existed for 14 years before another merger took place, this time due to encouragement from the Council of Medical Education. The Council promised that if the Atlanta College of Physicians and Surgeons merged with the Atlanta School of Medicine, they would receive a Class A rating. After the merger, the American Medical Association began pressuring medical schools to align with universities in order to improve the quality of medical education nationwide. Just two years after the formation of the second version of the Atlanta Medical College, the College combined with Emory University, which was in its initial stages of development and sought to add medical education to its offerings. On June 28, 1915 the Emory School of Medicine was established.

Emory University School of Medicine traces its origins back to 1915 when the Atlanta Medical College (founded 1854), the Southern Medical College (1878), and the Atlanta School of Medicine (founded 1905) merged.

== Admission and societies ==
In 2017, the entering class of 143 medical students hailed from 65 different colleges and had an average undergraduate GPA of 3.7 and an average MCAT of 514. In the 2017 entering class, 57% of the students were female, 8% were MD/PhD, 15% were MD/MPH, the average age at matriculation was 23.6 with a range of 21 to 31. Three students (2%) were non-U.S. citizens/permanent residents from Germany, Jamaica, and Turkey. 69% of the class were non-traditional students, meaning that they took at least 1 year out from college prior to matriculation.

Upon matriculation, medical students are divided into four societies through which they participate in small group learning exercises that foster differential diagnosis abilities, clinical skills, and professional development. The societies are named after four historic physicians who contributed significantly to the practice of medical science during their lifetimes.

- William Harvey Society
- Ignaz Semmelweis Society
- Joseph Lister Society
- Sir William Osler Society

== Curriculum ==
The curriculum features a condensed pre-clinical learning phase in which students cover the basic medical sciences in 1.5 years. Students typically take the USMLE Step 1 by February of their second year allowing them to begin their medical clerkship phase at Emory-affiliated hospitals. The unique design of the curriculum allows for a 5-month Discovery Phase in the third year which encourages students to pursue research in any medically related field including basic science, translational medicine, clinical research, public health, among others. The Emory University School of Medicine offers a variety of dual degree programs including MD-Masters in Public Health, MD-Masters in Clinical Research, MD-Masters in Business Administration, MD-MA in Bioethics, and MD-PhD (the PhD can be completed through the Emory University Laney Graduate School, Rollins School of Public Health, or the Georgia Institute of Technology).

== Training facilities and affiliated institutions ==
The School of Medicine is located on the main Emory University campus in the Druid Hills section of Atlanta and in Emory-owned and affiliated medical facilities throughout metropolitan Atlanta including Grady Memorial Hospital, Emory University Hospital, Emory University Hospital Midtown, Atlanta Veterans Affairs Medical Center and Children's Healthcare of Atlanta. Many of these hospitals are part of Emory Healthcare. Affiliated research institutions include Yerkes National Primate Research Center and the Centers for Disease Control and Prevention.

== Rankings and reputation ==
In its 2021 rankings of the best medical schools in the United States, U.S. News & World Report placed Emory University School of Medicine at #24 in research and #25 in primary care. Times Higher Education World University Rankings placed the School of Medicine at #32 in the world for Clinical/Pre-clinical and Health in its 2019 rankings list.

== Notable alumni and faculty ==
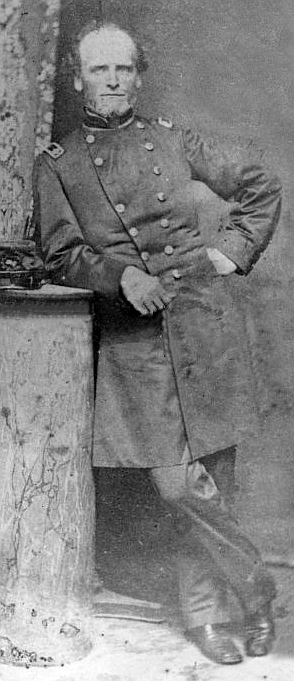
Samuel Hollingsworth Stout

- Samuel Hollingsworth Stout (1822–1903), professor of surgery from 1866 to 1867
- Evangeline Papageorge (masters degree 1929), biochemistry professor and assistant dean (1956–1975)
- Arnall Patz (M.D. 1945), Congressional Medal of Freedom recipient; expert in infant blindness and the use of lasers to treat eye disease
- Ferrol Sams (M.D. 1945), physician-novelist and inductee of the Georgia Writers Hall of Fame
- James Wesley Turpin (M.D. 1955), founder, Project Concern International
- Hamilton E. Holmes (M.D. 1967), first African American student to attend the Emory University School of Medicine; later became professor of orthopedics and Associate Dean at Emory and Medical Director of Grady Memorial Hospital.
- Sonny Carter (M.D. 1973), physician and NASA astronaut who flew on STS-33
- David T. Curiel (M.D. 1982) cancer biologist, medical academic, biotechnology researcher and inventor
