= Jacob Curiel of Coimbra =

Portuguese merchant and navy commander

Captain Jacob Curiel of Coimbra
- Born: 1514; Coimbra, Portugal
- Died: 1577 (aged 62–63); Coimbra, Portugal
- Children: Abraham Curiel, physician
- Relatives: Fernão Nunes (brother)
- Military career
- Allegiance: Spain
- Rank: Captain

Jacob Curiel of Coimbra (1514-1576), also known as Jacob Curiel or Duarte Nunes of Coimbra, was a prosperous Portuguese cloth merchant and navy commander.

== Life and career ==
Curiel was born into a family of crypto-Jews, the brother of Fernão Nunes, and grandson of Jeronimo de Saldanha y Bovadilha, who was a Portuguese nobleman. Curiel rose to become a captain in the Spanish Navy, commanding two fleets. Upon discovering that Curiel was Jewish, his sailors freed him because they had respected him. He was the father of Abraham Curiel. Historian Jonathan Israel described him as one of the most influential merchants of the sixteenth century.
