= Luis del Carmen Curiel =

Mexican general during the Mexican Revolution

General Luis del Carmen Curiel
- Born: 1846
- Died: 1930 (aged 83–84)
- Alma mater: Yale University
- Military career
- Allegiance: Mexico
- Branch: Mexican Army
- Rank: General

Luis del Carmen Curiel (1846 – 1930) was a Mexican general during the Mexican Revolution who served as Governor of the Federal District from 19 February 1877 to 2 December 1880.

He studied law at Yale University in New Haven, Connecticut. Curiel served as Governor of Jalisco twice until January 1903 and Governor of Yucatán from 11 March - 6 June 1911. He later served as a senator in the Senate of the Republic, XXVI legislature.

He has been described as a "tactful military politician."
