= San Llorente =

Coordinates: 41.687°N 4.065°W

San Llorente, Spain
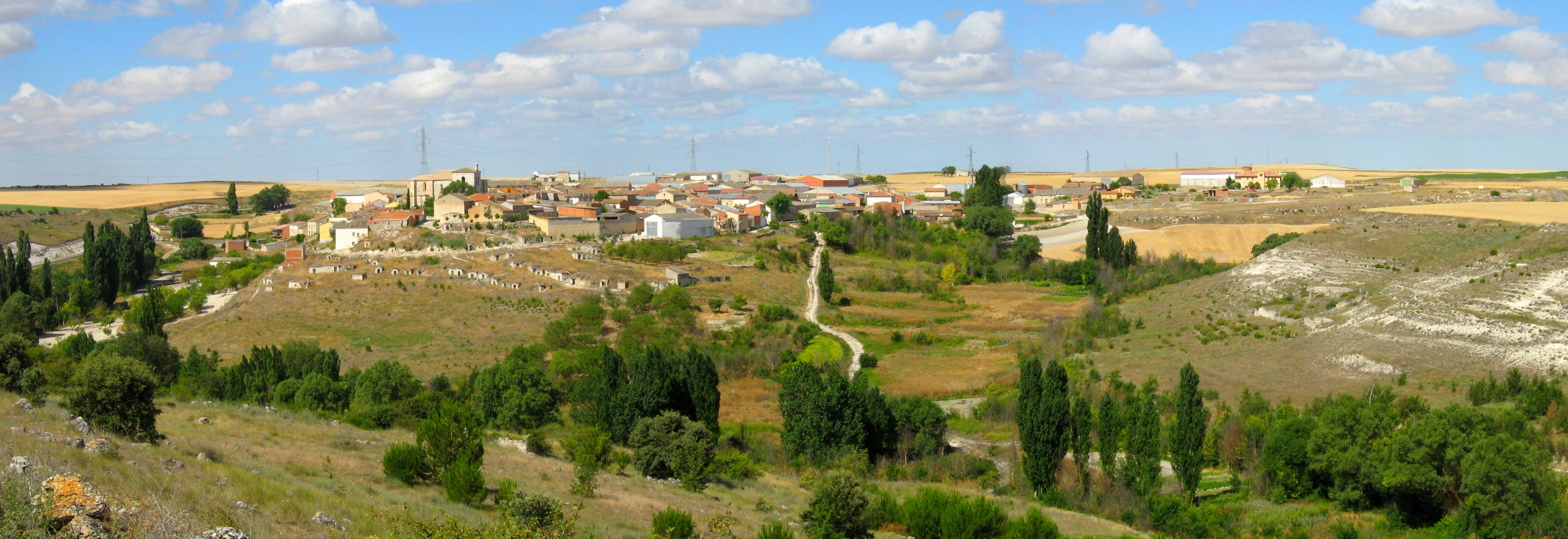
- Country: Spain
- Autonomous community: Castilla and León
- Province: Valladolid
- Municipality: San Llorente

Area
  - Total: 24 km^{2} (9.3 sq mi)
- Elevation: 889 m (2,917 ft)

Population (2025-01-01)
  - Total: 93
  - Density: 3.9/km^{2} (10/sq mi)
- Time zone: UTC+1 (CET)
  - Summer (DST): UTC+2 (CEST)

San Llorente is a municipality that is located in the province of Valladolid, Castile and León, Spain. According to the 2004 census (INE), the municipality had a population of 178.3512 inhabitants.
