= Valdearcos de la Vega =

Coordinates: 41°39′N 4°03′W

Valdearcos de la Vega, Spain
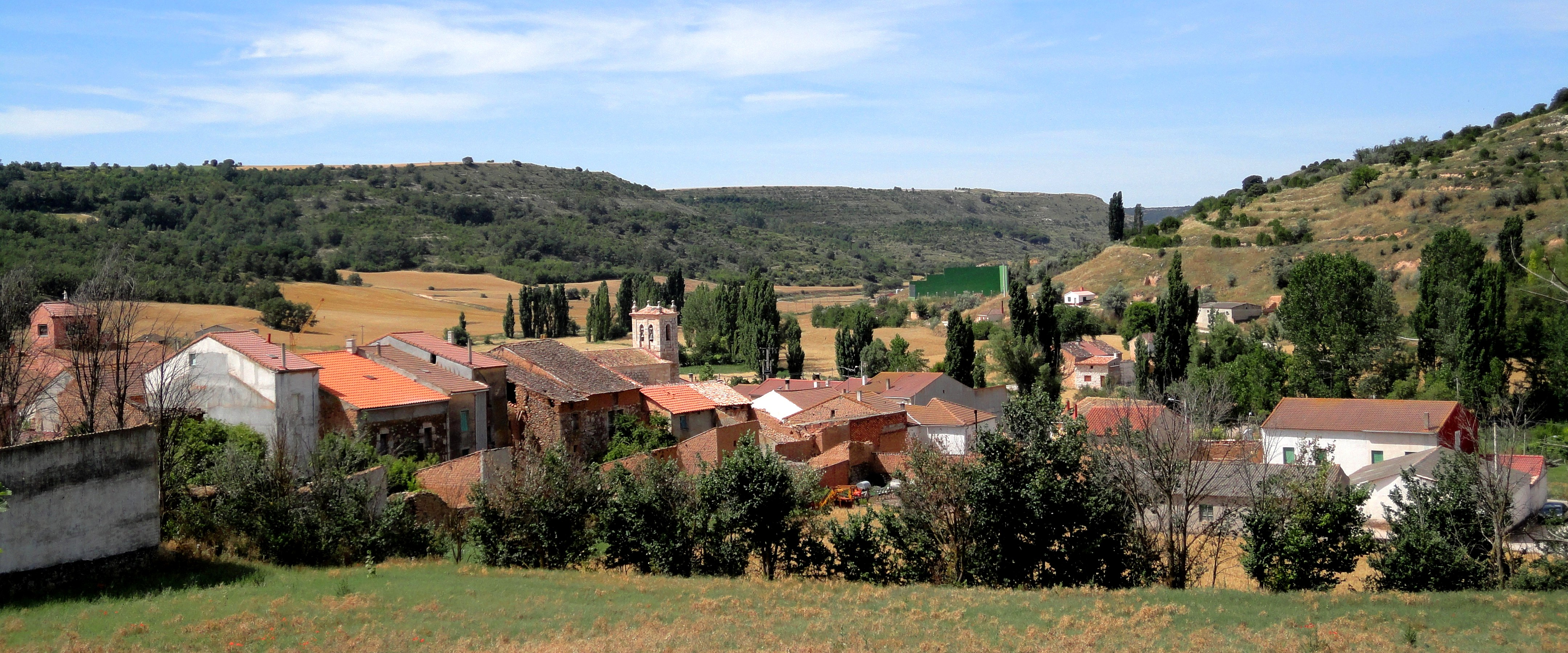
- church
- Country: Spain
- Autonomous community: Castile and León
- Province: Valladolid
- Municipality: Valdearcos de la Vega

Area
  - Total: 14 km^{2} (5.4 sq mi)

Population (2025-01-01)
  - Total: 56
  - Density: 4.0/km^{2} (10/sq mi)
- Time zone: UTC+1 (CET)
  - Summer (DST): UTC+2 (CEST)

Valdearcos de la Vega is a municipality located in the province of Valladolid, Castile and León, Spain. According to the 2004 census (INE), the municipality has a population of 115 inhabitants.
