= Roturas =

Coordinates: 41.668°N 4.119°W

Roturas, Spain
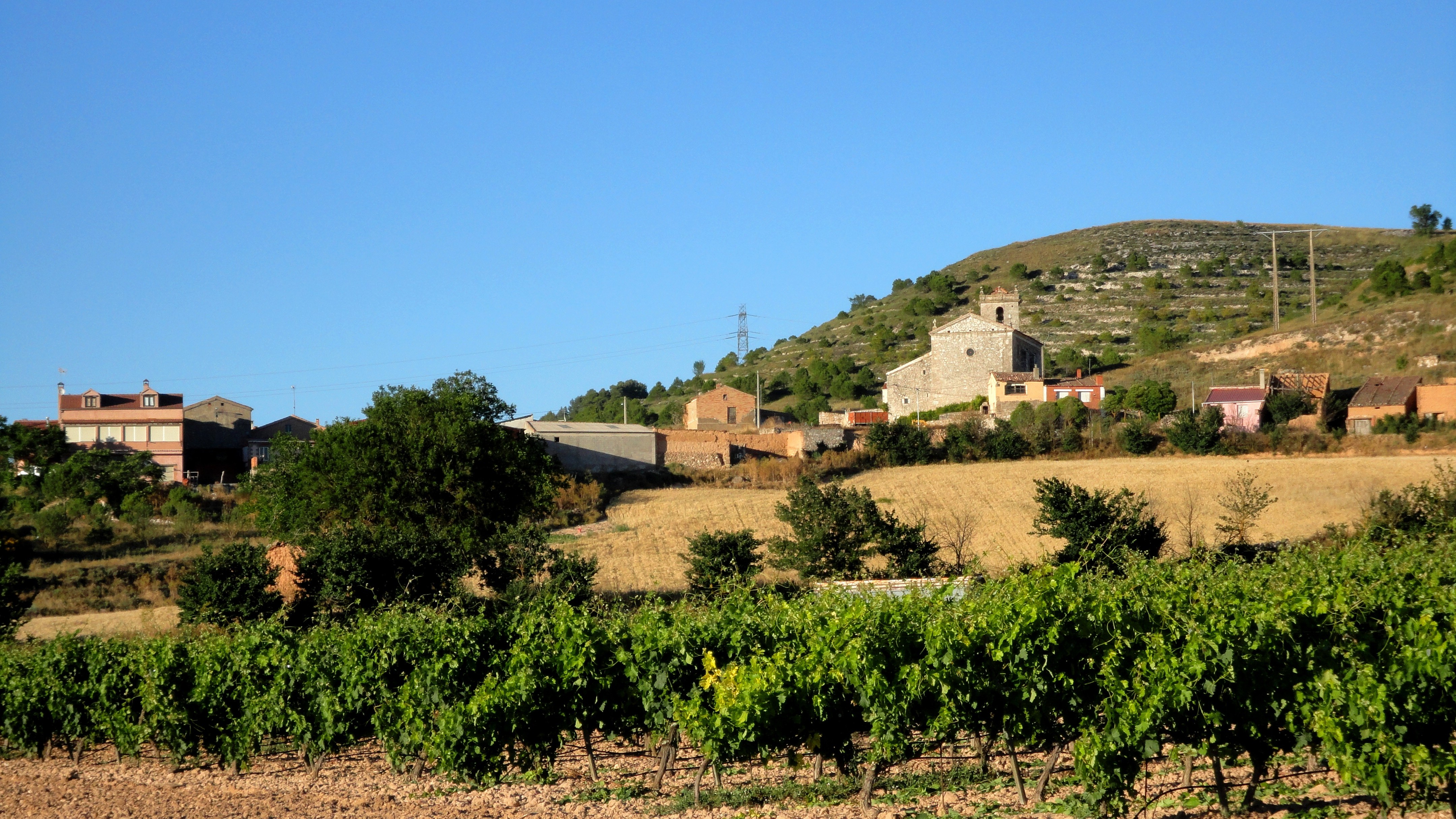
- Country: Spain
- Autonomous community: Castile and León
- Province: Valladolid
- Municipality: Roturas

Area
  - Total: 11 km^{2} (4.2 sq mi)

Population (2025-01-01)
  - Total: 26
  - Density: 2.4/km^{2} (6.1/sq mi)
- Time zone: UTC+1 (CET)
  - Summer (DST): UTC+2 (CEST)

Roturas is a municipality located in the province of Valladolid, Castile and León, Spain. According to the 2004 census (INE), the municipality has a population of 32 inhabitants.
