= David T. Curiel =

American cancer biologist

- Born: 1956 (age 69–70); Douglasville, Georgia, USA

Academic background
- Education: BSc, Chemistry, 1978, West Georgia College; MD, 1982, Emory University; PhD, Virology, 2002, University of Groningen
- Thesis: Genetic capsid modification for adenovirus retargeting (2002)

Academic work
- Institutions: Washington University in St. Louis; University of Alabama at Birmingham; University of North Carolina at Chapel Hill

David Terry Curiel (born 1956) is an American cancer biologist. He is a professor of Radiation Oncology at Washington University School of Medicine. In 1995, Curiel led a research team who were one of the first to develop a vaccine based on messenger RNA. Although they published proof of concept, he could not continue testing due to a lack of funding. In 2021, Curiel developed a vaccine that targets the SARS-CoV-2 virus through the nose.

== Early life and education ==
Curiel was born in 1956 His father was from the Dominican Republic and practiced general medicine in Georgia. Curiel is of Jewish descent. Following high school, Curiel remained in his home state for his Bachelor of Science at West Georgia College and medical degree at the Emory University School of Medicine. Upon receiving his medical degree, Curiel completed his internship and residency at Emory in 1985 and his fellowships in pulmonary medicine and biotechnology at the National Institutes of Health in 1990. He enrolled at the University of Groningen in the Netherlands for his PhD.

== Career ==
Following his fellowships, Curiel became an assistant professor of medicine at the University of North Carolina at Chapel Hill (UNC). In this role, he began working on gene transfer techniques for the treatment of cystic fibrosis. In 1992, he began combining two different gene therapy approaches into a virus using Adenovirus. Healthy genes are transferred to defective cells on the outer coat of inactivated adenoviruses which in turn enter the cell nuclei where defective genes lie. His research efforts earned him the 1992 James W Woods Junior Faculty Award from UNC. Following this, Curiel was appointed Director of the University of Alabama at Birmingham's (UAB) Gene Therapy Program in 1993. While serving in this role, Curiel led a research team who were the first to develop a vaccine based on messenger RNA. Although they published proof of concept, he could not continue testing due to a lack of funding and public interest. Curiel also served as the principal investigator (PI) of a team researching how to develop unique methods of delivering genes to specific targets. His efforts in gene therapy earned him the funding to study a system to define tumor cell signatures. In January 2000, Curiel was appointed Director of the Division of Human Gene Therapy at University of Alabama at Birmingham School of Medicine.

As Director of the Division of Human Gene Therapy, Curiel oversaw a consortium of scientists who modified an adenovirus that reproduces inside tumor cells in order to eradicate them called Delta-24-RGD. This was thought to be the first treatment for malignant glioma. While testing the Delta-24-RGD treatment with scientists at the MD Anderson Cancer Center, their research teams found that the treatment would completely eradicate brain tumors in mice, while leaving healthy brain tissue alone. He also founded VectorLogics, Inc. in order to develop products to treat ovarian cancer. In 2004, Curiel was a finalist for the Director position at the University of Arizona's Institute for Biomedical Science and Biotechnology. However, he chose to remain at UAB until 2011 when he became Director of the Washington University in St. Louis (WashU) Biologic Therapeutics Center. During his final years at UAB, Scientific American magazine deemed Curiel's 2003 co-authored paper on virotherapy as "one of 10 groundbreaking stories of the past 10 years."

Upon joining the faculty at WashU in 2011, Curiel was appointed a professor of radiation oncology with tenure. He also merged his company VectorLogics, Inc. with DNAtrix, a biotechnology company developing targeted adenovirus-based oncolytic virus products for brain cancer. In 2012, Curiel collaborated with scientist Mike Mathis from LSU Health Sciences Center Shreveport to test the adenovirus on colon cancer in mice. These experiments resulted in the discovery that the adenovirus could target tumor blood vessels in mice without affecting healthy tissues. His use of viral vector technology to optimize the immune system's response to vaccines earned him one of the 2015 Bear Cub Challenge award from the Skandalaris Center for Interdisciplinary Innovation and Entrepreneurship. Due to the 2015–16 Zika virus epidemic, Curiel and Precision Virologics commercialized an adenovirus vaccine to prevent the disease and others. In 2019, he received funding from the National Center for Advancing Translational Sciences to support his research into discovering new therapeutics for genetic diseases. This eventually developed into a new approach to facilitate the "CAR-T" immunotherapy that makes it cheaper and more patient-accessible.

During the COVID-19 pandemic, Curiel harnessed gene therapy and viral vectors to develop therapeutics and vaccines to combat the novel coronavirus. Early in the pandemic, Curiel and Michael S. Diamond re-engineered Adenovirus to carry the Sars-Covid2 spike gene in order to protect against infection and sterilize the upper airways. Their single-dose, nasal vaccine was proven successful in mice and nonhuman primates which led them to begin trials in India with Bharat Biotech. Curiel was later named a senior member of the National Academy of Inventors for his gene-therapy research. In late January 2023, the nasal vaccine received approval from India's Ministry of Health and Family Welfare and Science and Technology Minister Jitendra Singh Rana to be added to the primary 2-dose schedule.
