= Alonso Curiel =

Spanish merchant

Alonso de Curiel (active 1577–1603) was a Spanish merchant, diplomat in the Habsburg Netherlands, and member of the Sephardi Jewish Curiel family.

== Early life ==
Alonso was the son of a prosperous merchant, Diego de Curiel, who maintained important relations with the Court of Madrid. His uncle, Jerónimo de Curiel, acquired great influence in Antwerp business circles. Diego sent Alonso to Antwerp to ensure the continuity of the family's position, as Jerónimo had no male heir.

== Mercantile activity ==
In August 1577, Jerónimo commended his nephew Alonso de Curiel to the care of the governor of the Habsburg Netherlands, John of Austria.

On 9 March 1578, Don John ordered Curiel to participate in an important financial negotiation on behalf of Philip II of Spain to obtain funds from Antwerp, Madrid and Burgos. The king maintained an expectant interest in these negotiations and congratulated Curiel on several occasions.

Later, he negotiated trade with the Belgian nobleman Emmanuel de Lalaing and with a number of towns, including Saint-Omer. It has been suggested that Dutch and Belgian historiography underestimates Curiel's role in bringing about the reconciliation of the Walloon provinces to the royal cause in the 1579 Treaty of Arras.

On 4 August 1603, Philip III appointed him as Agent of the Spanish Crown for trade with "the States of Flanders, Islands of Holland, and Zealand, vassals of Princes and Republics, friends and Neutrals."

== Publications ==
- Lettres interceptes du Contador Alonso de Curiel, au Prince de Parme (Antwerp, 1579)
- Relación de los servicios que Alonso de Curiel hizo en Flandes a su Majestad, y los recados que en aprobación dellos tiene (Valladolid, [1603])
