= Francisco Curiel =

Spanish philologist and antiquarian

Francisco-Jesús Álvarez Curiel is a Spanish philologist and antiquarian perhaps best known for his work on popular Andalusian vocabulary. He writes in Spanish but his books have been translated into English and German.

== Bibliography ==
- Cancionero Popular Andaluz (Arguval, 1992)
- Supersticiones Populares Andaluzas (Arguval, 1993)
- Villanueva del Rosario: Historia y Vida (Malaga, 1996)
- Vocabulario Popular Andaluz (Madrid: Arguval, 2004)
- Mil Refranes y Trece Ensayos (Arguval, 2008)
