= Israel ben Meir di Curiel =

16th-century rabbi in Safed

Personal life
- Born: 1501
- Died: 1573 (aged 71–72)
- Notable work: Or Ẓaddikim
- Occupation: Rabbi, preacher

Religious life
- Religion: Judaism

Jewish leader
- Teacher: Joseph Fasi; Isaac Luria; Jacob Berab
- Post: Member of the Safed beth din
- Disciples: Mordechai HaKohen of Safed; Bezalel Ashkenazi

Israel ben Meir di Curiel (1501–1573) was a 16th-century rabbi in Safed, Ottoman Syria and member of the prominent Curiel family who were later ennobled by Joao IV of Portugal in 1641.

== Biography ==
Israel ben Meir di Curiel was a disciple of Joseph Fasi in Adrianople and also stayed for a time in Constantinople. In Safed he studied under Isaac Luria and Jacob Berab, by whom he was subsequently ordained. He served together with Joseph Karo and Moses Trani on the Safed beth din (law court). Di Curiel's students included Mordechai HaKohen of Safed and Bezalel Ashkenazi. An outstanding preacher in his time, his homilies were collected and published, in addition to his Or Ẓaddikim (Salonica 1799). The renowned poet Israel Najara was his grandson.
