= Curiel (brand) =

Italian fashion brand

CURIEL
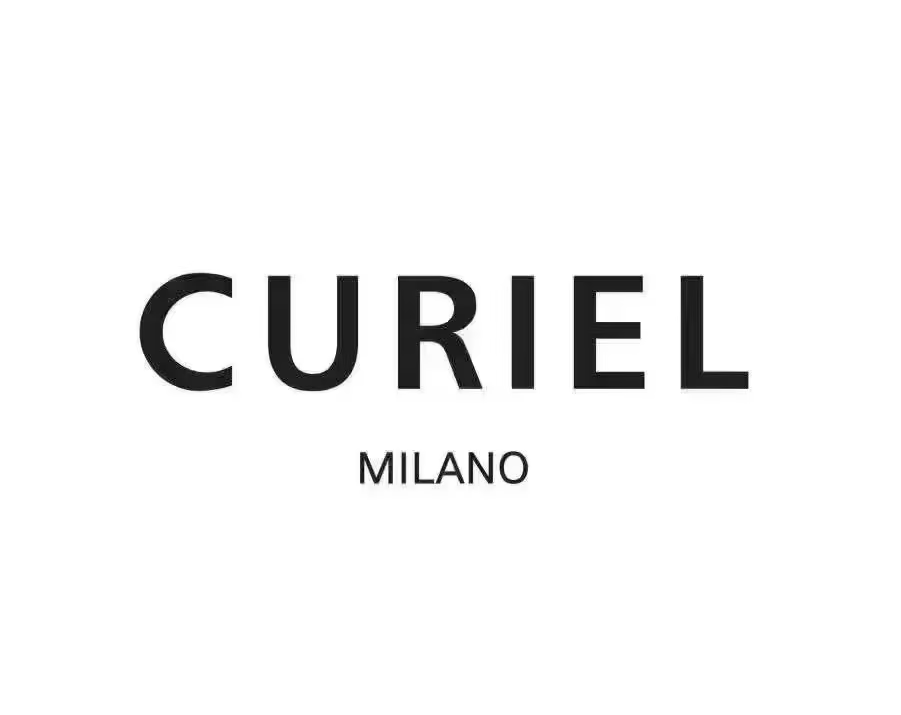
- Industry: Fashion
- Founded: 1908
- Founder: Ortensia Curiel
- Headquarters: Milan, Italy
- Products: Women's ready to wear, accessories
- Website: curiel.it

Curiel is an Italian fashion brand known for its Alta Moda and little black dress passed down through four generations of family heiresses. It was founded in 1908 in Trieste, an Italian seaport city by Ortensia Curiel and is based in Milan.

== History ==
Curiel is founded in 1908 in Trieste by Ortensia Curiel, who operated an atelier in Trieste near the bookstore of poet Umberto Saba, located in the central Palazzo Smolars (on the corner of Via Mazzini and Piazza della Repubblica). She dressed the finest Trieste and Central European society of the time.

In 1945, the niece of Ortensia, Gigliola Curie, inherited the professional legacy of her aunt and later moved to Milan, where she brilliantly brought together the high aristocracy, artists, intellectuals, and the nouveau riche in her atelier. She later made several customized costumes for the premieres of Teatro alla Scala in Milan which was one of the most notable theaters at that time.,

In 1964, Gigliola's Curiellino little black dress - a dress ready to wear from morning till night - was introduced to great success. She also presented her first collection in New York at Bergdorf Goodman, and Harrods of London in 1965. She was the first Italian designer to introduce ready-to-wear to the United States. In the same year, Karl Lagerfeld began a design collaboration with Curiel before he began the collaboration with Fendi.

Raffaella Curiel, the daughter of Gigliola, after completing her classical studies, decided to continue the family tradition, choosing an internship at Balmain in Paris over a medical degree. Not yet twenty, she returned to Milan and presented her first collection on the catwalk in 1961. At the end of the 1960s, following the sudden death of her mother, she moved the business to two rented rooms on Corso Matteotti.

Raffaella Curiel was active in the fashion field since the seventies. Her works combined fashion and art, earning the nickname of "The intellectual of Italian fashion". In 1986 Raffaella Curiel started to deal with ALTA MODA Roma where she combined different inspirations across fashion and culture. Every défilé paid tribute to painters such as Klimt, Goya, Velasquez, Van Gogh, Schiele, Beardsley, Depero, Vermeer, as well as African art, Russian art, Tudor England, Maharaja’s India, Frida Kahlo’s Mexico.

The story rewards her in 1984 when she was nominated Commander, in 1985 Grand Officer of the Republic. In 1995 she received the Ambrogino d’Oro and in 1997 the Cavalry of the Great Cross of the Italian Republic. In 2002, she went to Rome at Palazzo Farnese with a collection of couture inspired by Victor Hugo, the only Italian designer invited to the French Embassy in Italy.

In 1992 Raffaella Curiel opened a showroom in New York and in 1996 she started to present in Japan.

In 1994, Gigliola Castellini Curiel, the daughter of Raffaella started working with her mother in the atelier. She later started her own collection line in 1998.

In 2016, Curiel has signed a joint venture with RedStone Haute Couture.

Since the fall of 2025, Curiel has multiple presences in luxury destinations of Europe and East Asia such as Italy, Switzerland and Japan.

In September 2025, Curiel opened a new flagship - Casa Curiel Milano, in the historic atelier at Via Monte Napoleone 13, where the maison's archives are housed and displayed. More than a simple boutique, Casa Curiel Milano is a hybrid of store, showroom, atelier and archive house.

=== Intellectual of Italian Fashion ===
Vocation of Curiel: multidisciplinarity, that is, the connection to different disciplines, from the history of art to cultures elsewhere. This has earned the title Intellectual of Fashion for Raffaella Curiel. Her language concretizes the obsession of combining different inspirations, such as visual art, that flow into what she renews in Moda-Cultura. From her very first collection she renders homage to Picasso, Manet, the Impressionist movement, Klimt, Velazquez and many others. But she also takes her inspirations from her trips and from the romances she likes to read: from Victor Hugo to the Asian world, passing by Frida Khalo.

=== Ballet ===
Carla Fracci (20 August 1936 - 27 May 2021), is a renowned Italian ballerina, actress, and ballet director. Widely regarded as one of the most exceptional ballerinas of the 20th century, she held the position of principal dancer at the Teatro alla Scala Ballet in Milan. Following her tenure there, she embarked on a freelance career, collaborating with esteemed international companies such as the Royal Ballet of London, the Stuttgart Ballet, the Royal Swedish Ballet, and the American Ballet Theatre. Fracci gained acclaim for her captivating portrayals of the leading roles in various Romantic ballets, including The Witch, Giselle, Swan Lake, and Romeo and Juliet. Additionally, she showcased her talent in productions such as Nijinsky and The Complete Bell Telephone Hour.

One of Fracci's close friends and allies in the world of La Scala Theater was Raffaella Curiel, who not only served as her stylist but also shared a deep bond with her. Curiel fondly remembers Fracci as someone who was born to dance, possessing the humility that distinguishes great individuals.

=== Philanthropy ===
Gigliola Curiel has worked through cancer without ever stopping or complaining until the end of her days. After she died, people found that she was running a school in Parma to help deaf and dumb people. Raffaella's commitment to social causes came from her early vocation to be a doctor seeing her mother dying from cancer. It began in 1965 as she worked for a center helping children who suffer from Down syndrome. She was in the front line in the fight against cancer, as well as the founder of the Lombardy League for the fight against drugs. In the Nineties working as a volunteer for the Red Cross, she started to promote blood donation. During an era in which anorexia represented the main plague of the fashion world, Raffaella Curiel declared that her models shouldn’t have been as thin as the standards we were used to. Her attention is also towards the women in jail, which leads to her collaboration with the San Vittore Prison.

=== Made in Italy ===
In the fashion drama Made in Italy, which aired in 2020, every episode delves into the narrative of an influential Italian designer and the iconic brand they established such as Versace, Armani, Krizia, and Missoni, which have created the true Made in Italy label together. Episode four specifically focuses on the story of CURIEL.

== Style ==
Curiel's style is to make women with a fashion that exalts them without overwhelming, which they value without exhibiting, which expresses sophistication without being lazy. The collection reflects the traditional style and character associated with Milanese fashion. It focuses on more of a balance of simple designs and creative details. The clothing features short and fast-paced styles which combines classic elements with modern trends. The design approach in using high-quality tailoring to create looks that appear simple.

== Products ==
Curiel was known for its Alta Moda and Curiellino dress in the history but is now famous for its ready-to-wear little black dress collection, especially in velvet as it's the iconic fabric of the maison. The made-to-measure couture evening dress is also one of the main product lines.

Among its signatures: TULIP, the dress with iconic 1950s silhouette. TUBINO, the maison's iconic silhouette crafted from velvet. DIVA, the embodiment of Raffaella's romanticism. HEPBURN, a tribute to the timeless elegance of black and white.

Since 2024, Curiel has collaborated with the Italian Ballet brand DellaLo' Milano, to co-launch the DellaLo' for CURIEL crossover collection.

Curiel also revived its historic SPOSA wedding collection in 2025 with six couture wedding dresses.

== Clients ==
Curiel has been designing Alta Moda for prestigious women of different nationalities and cultural backgrounds such as Hillary Clinton, Margaret Thatcher, Letizia Moratti, and the wife of Egyptian President Mubarak.

== Events ==
=== Raffaella Curiel: Arte e moda ===
On June 19, 2010, a major exhibition Raffaella Curiel: Arte e moda dedicated to the Trieste-born designer Raffaella Curiel opened in the Sala Umberto Veruda of Palazzo Costanzi, Trieste. The exhibition, promoted by FIDAPA (Italian Federation of Women in the Arts, Professions, and Business) - Trieste's Historical Section, in collaboration with the City of Trieste - Department of Culture and the Culture Area Directorate, conceived and curated by architect Marianna Accerboni, aimed to showcase the creativity of Raffaella Curiel and offered not only a fashion exhibition, but also an art exhibition which combined original design in tailoring and artistic craftsmanship.

The underlying theme of the Trieste exhibition was not only to offer visitors the image of a sophisticated couturier, but to underline the more cultured and artistic aspects of her fashion design. This theme was communicated through a line of unique dresses which Curiel dedicated to great artists, writers, refined interpreters of specific cultural milieus, and to African and Asian civilizations. The collection composed a mosaic in which the art of fashion interpreted the arts of painting, writing and culture.

The retrospective offered an educational itinerary, retracing the development of her most significant designs through sketches, photographs, show videos, reproductions of paintings, her own introductory text, and in-depth historical and critical texts. On July 11, Palazzo Costanzi hosted an evening of music and light for Raffaella Curiel where her works was presented by the curator through live performances of musical pieces inspired by the dresses on display.

=== History and Future ===
Curiel held a retrospective History and Future on August 22, 2016 at the Church of San Carpoforo in Milan. The exhibition was dedicated to showcasing the brand’s history and future plans and has highlighted the various keystones of Curiel's imaginative language such as the La Scala section - the couture creations worn by members of high society and the aristocracy for the premieres of major operas, and the brand's art and creations inspired by the works of the great contemporary masters. It has also introduced Exoticism section, dedicated to creations inspired by distant cultures, together with the White and Print & Graphic spaces, which staged a dialogue between the vivid colors of prints and the virginal purity of white. Special attention was especially paid to the Curiellino section as one of the brand's cornerstones: the Italian "little black dress."

=== Runway Fall/Winter 2018-19 ===
On September 19, 2018, Curiel unveiled its Fall/Winter 2018-19 Alta Moda collection at La Casa degli Atellani, in which 24 atelier creations designed by Raffaella Curiel were introduced. The collection was inspired by the art of Gustav Klimt and the Vienna Secession Movement. The residence was home to Leonardo's famous vineyard, in a building of the 15th century by the Lord of Milan, Ludovico il Moro.

=== Raffaella Curiel: Viaggio nell'Arte ===
On November 12, 2020, the Naples Fashion Museum – Mondragone Foundation, led by Special Commissioner Maria d'Elia, opened the exhibition Raffaella Curiel: Viaggio nell'Arte, curated by Donatella Dentice di Accadia with exhibition design by Michele Iodice. The exhibition was part of an innovative project that adapted existing spaces to a journey through the history of clothing, tracing the process of women's emancipation through the exhibition. It paid homage to Raffaella's sartorial production from 1983 to 2016, inspired by the masterpieces of art masters and art of Africa, Tudor and Japan. The retrospective also celebrated the Naples Fashion Museum's acquisition of the "Panier" dress, donated by the Raffaella herself, which has enriched the collection and confirmed the designer's historical and stylistic significance.

=== Girl to be Woman ===
Curiel held the first Girl to be Woman awards ceremony on March 20, 2024 at Regent Shanghai on the Bund, in cooperation with the elite magazine Tatler. The gala has honored twelve outstanding young women in six art fields that are strongly related to the brand, including theater, dance, art, film, music and fashion. The ceremony was dedicated to inspiring global talents and providing them with a platform to connect.

== Publications ==
Gigliola Curiel: una vita nella moda, published by Le Lettere, is a fictionalized biography featuring the life of the family written by Gaetano Castellini Curiel, the nephew of Gigliola Curiel's. It's not a celebratory hagiography of a designer, but a historical testimony resulting from five years of research.

Lo Stile in Cucina, written by Raffaella Curiel and published in 2010 by Codice Atlantico, is a 192-page gastronomic diary, containing more than one hundred recipes, accompanied by sketches, original drawings and photographs from her personal archive.

The Magic World of Curiel is an Italian book written by Donata Sartorio & Cesare Cunaccia telling the story of the 2 main figures of the family with plenty of photos and illustrations . The first part explores Gigliola Curiel's world, her passion for classical music, and her connection to La Scala, a symbol of Italian culture worldwide. The second part focuses on Raffaella's creative journey and her vision, which always drew on the world of art, recognizable through the sketches she created over the years for collections inspired by the great classical masters such as Vermeer and Velázquez, or more contemporary artists such as Balla and Boccioni.

== Stockists ==
Curiel's flagship is located at Via Monte Napoleone,13 in Milan, Italy, and it has more than 30 boutiques in China. It also presents in multiple luxury destinations across Europe and East Asia.
