= Bocos de Duero =

- Village
- Location in Spain Bocos de Duero (Spain)
- Coordinates: 41°37′28″N 4°4′3″W
- Country: Spain
- Autonomous community: Castile and León
- Province: Valladolid
- Comarca: Campo de Peñafiel

Area
  - Total: 6.34 km^{2} (2.45 sq mi)
- Elevation: 762 m (2,500 ft)

Population (2025-01-01)
  - Total: 79
- Demonym: bocenses

Bocos de Duero is a village in Valladolid, Castile-Leon, Spain. The municipality covers an area of 6.34 square kilometres (2.45 sq mi) and as of 2011 had a population of 63 people.

It is the seat of the parish of Nuestra Señora de las Nieves, archpriesthood of Peñafiel, vicariate of the Duero area of the archdiocese of Valladolid. The patron saints of the town are the Virgen de las Nieves (August 5) and San Miguel Arcángel (September 29).

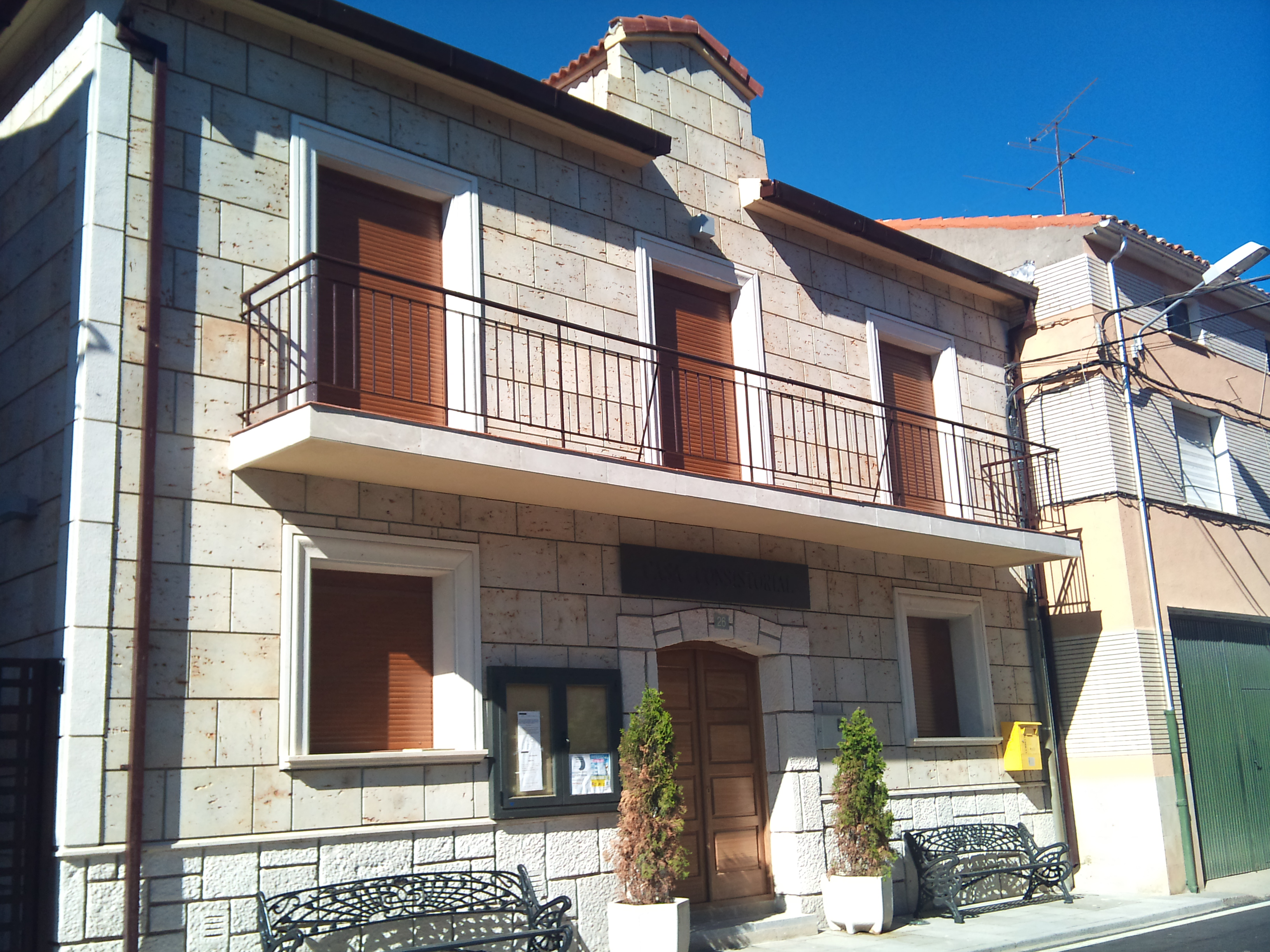
Town hall of Bocos de Duero
