= Pilar Montero Curiel =

Spanish academic

Professor Pilar Montero Curiel is a Spanish professor of Hispanic philology and linguistics at the University of Extremadura in Spain since 1999.

Between 2005-2007, Curiel was a visiting professor at the Philipps-Universität Marburg, Germany and University of Giessen, Germany from 2007-08. Between 2008 and 2010, she was a professor of philology at Heidelberg University in Heidelberg, Germany.
