= Curaçao Synagogue =

Synagogue in Willemstad, Curaçao

Mikvé Israel-Emanuel
- Hebrew: בית הכנסת מקווה ישראל-עמנואל
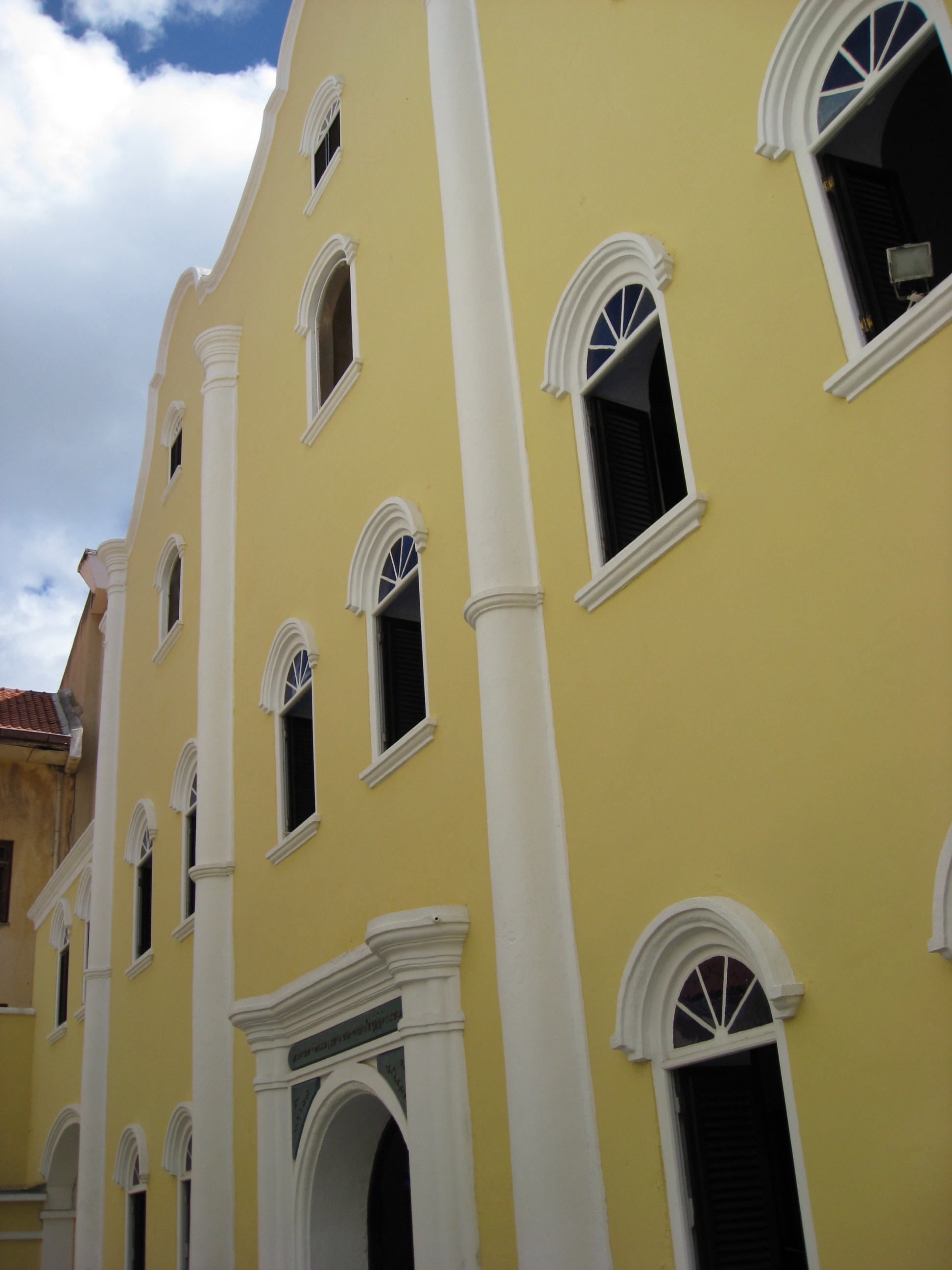
- The western façade of the synagogue in 2008

- Location of the synagogue in Curaçao

Religion
- Affiliation: Reconstructionist Judaism
- Rite: Sephardi
- Ecclesiastical or organisational status: Synagogue
- Status: Active

Location
- Location: Hanchi di Snoa 29, Punda, Willemstad
- Country: Curaçao
- Coordinates: 12°6′18″N 68°55′57″W

Architecture
- Type: Synagogue architecture
- Established: 1651 (as a congregation)
- Completed: 1732
- Materials: Brick

Website
- snoa.com (in Dutch)

The Mikvé Israel-Emanuel Synagogue (Hebrew: בית הכנסת מקווה ישראל-עמנואל, lit. 'Hope of Israel-Emanuel Synagogue') is a Reconstructionist Jewish congregation and synagogue, located at Hanchi di Snoa 29, Punda, in the city of Willemstad, Curaçao, a constituent country of the Kingdom of the Netherlands in southern Caribbean Sea. The congregation was established in 1651 and the synagogue was completed in 1732, making it the oldest surviving synagogue in the Americas.

Commonly known as the Snoa (short for esnoga, an old Portuguese and Judaeo-Spanish word for synagogue), it is a major tourist attraction in Curaçao, and was visited by Queen Beatrix of the Netherlands and her family in 1992.

== History ==
The congregation, Mikvé Israel, dates from the 1650s and consisted of Spanish and Portuguese Jews from the Netherlands and Brazil. In the nineteenth century there was a breakaway Reform community (Emanu El); the two merged to form the present community in 1964. The community is now affiliated with Reconstructionist Judaism.

The first synagogue building was purchased in 1674; the current building dates from 1730. One visitor to the synagogue observed, upon entering through a quiet courtyard, viewing the azure stained glass windows and walking across a sand covered floor toward the carved mahogany Torah ark that the sand floors remind congregants "of how its Jewish ancestors on the Iberian peninsula covered the floors of their makeshift prayer houses so that their footsteps would be muffled and the suspicion of potential denouncers would not be aroused."

With its three high vaulted ceilings, the ark and the pulpit, the galleries, the benches and the chandeliers, the interior of the synagogue bears a marked resemblance to the Portuguese Synagogue in Amsterdam. Attached to the synagogue is the Jewish Historical Cultural Museum, whose collection includes replicas of artistic tombstones from the Beit Chaim Bleinheim in Curaçao, the oldest Jewish cemetery still in use in the Western Hemisphere.

The other Royal Dutch island in the Caribbean with a historical synagogue is Sint Eustatius, where the ruins of the Honen Dalim synagogue of 1739 still stand on the Synagogepad ("Synagogue Path"). An even older synagogue existed at Jodensavanne, Suriname, Beracha ve Shalom ("Blessings and Peace"), built between 1665 and 1671. Unlike the Curaçao synagogue, however, these other synagogues are no longer in use.

== Gallery ==
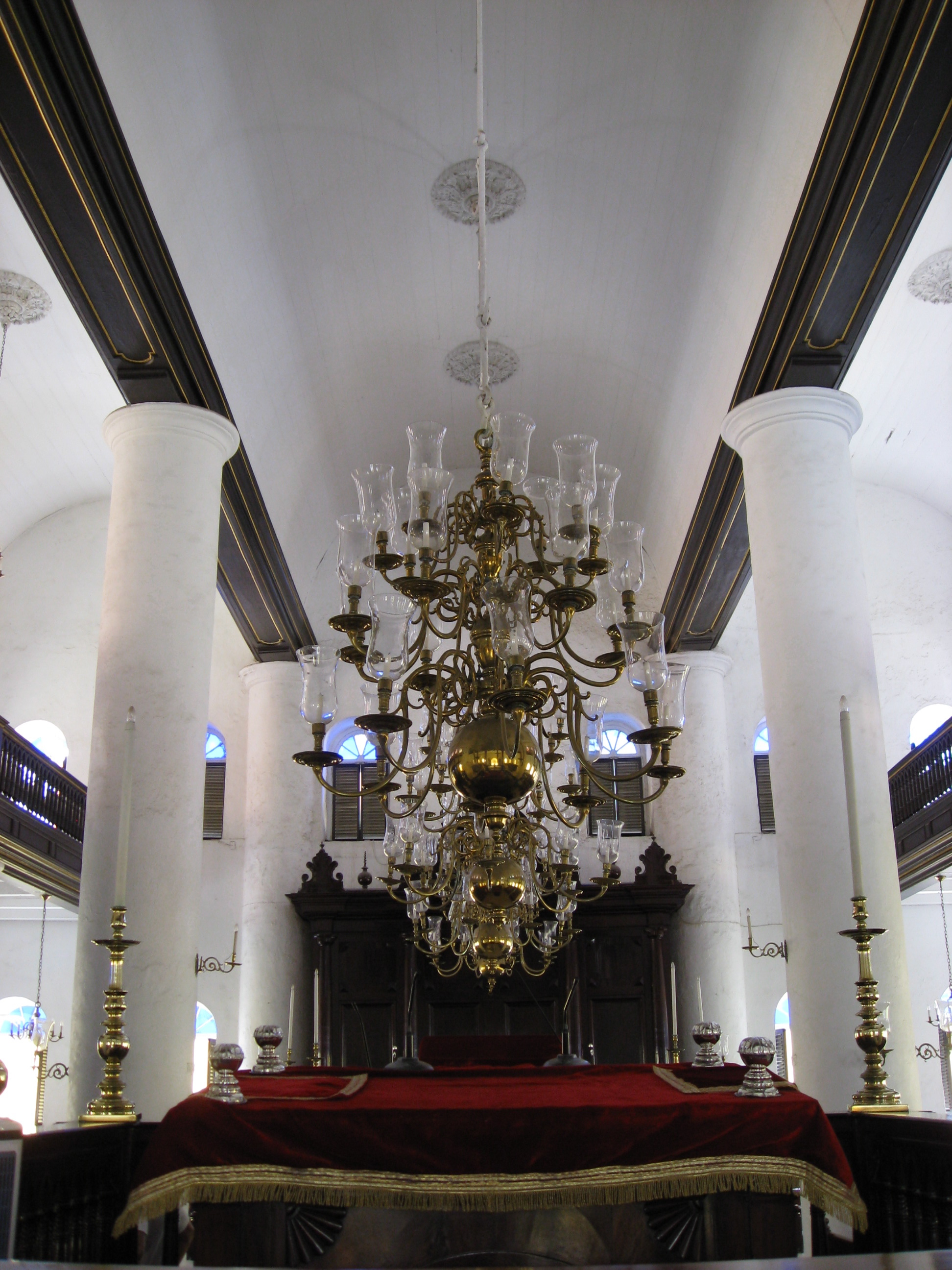
Sanctuary with mahogany bemah

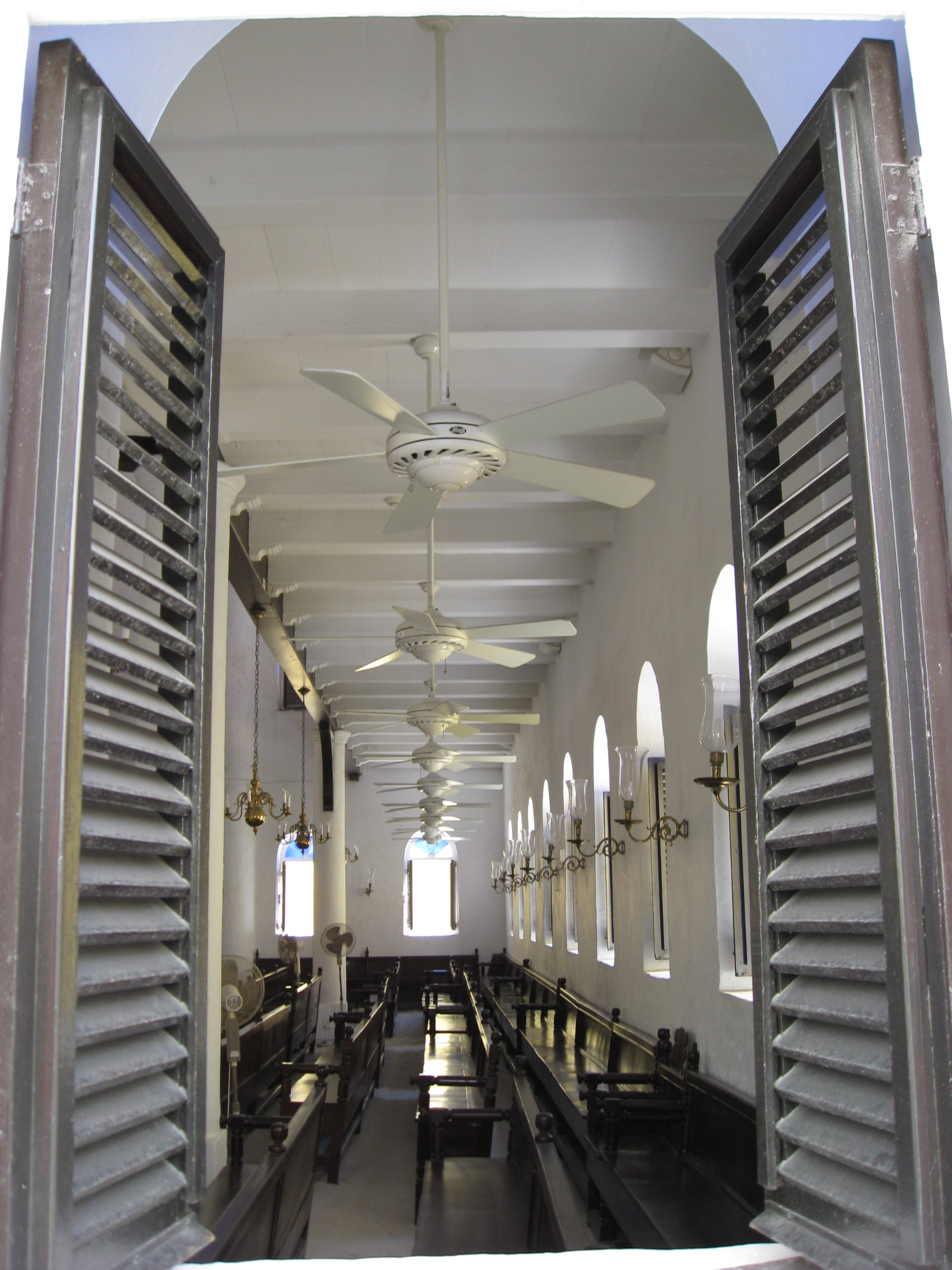
View through shuttered windows

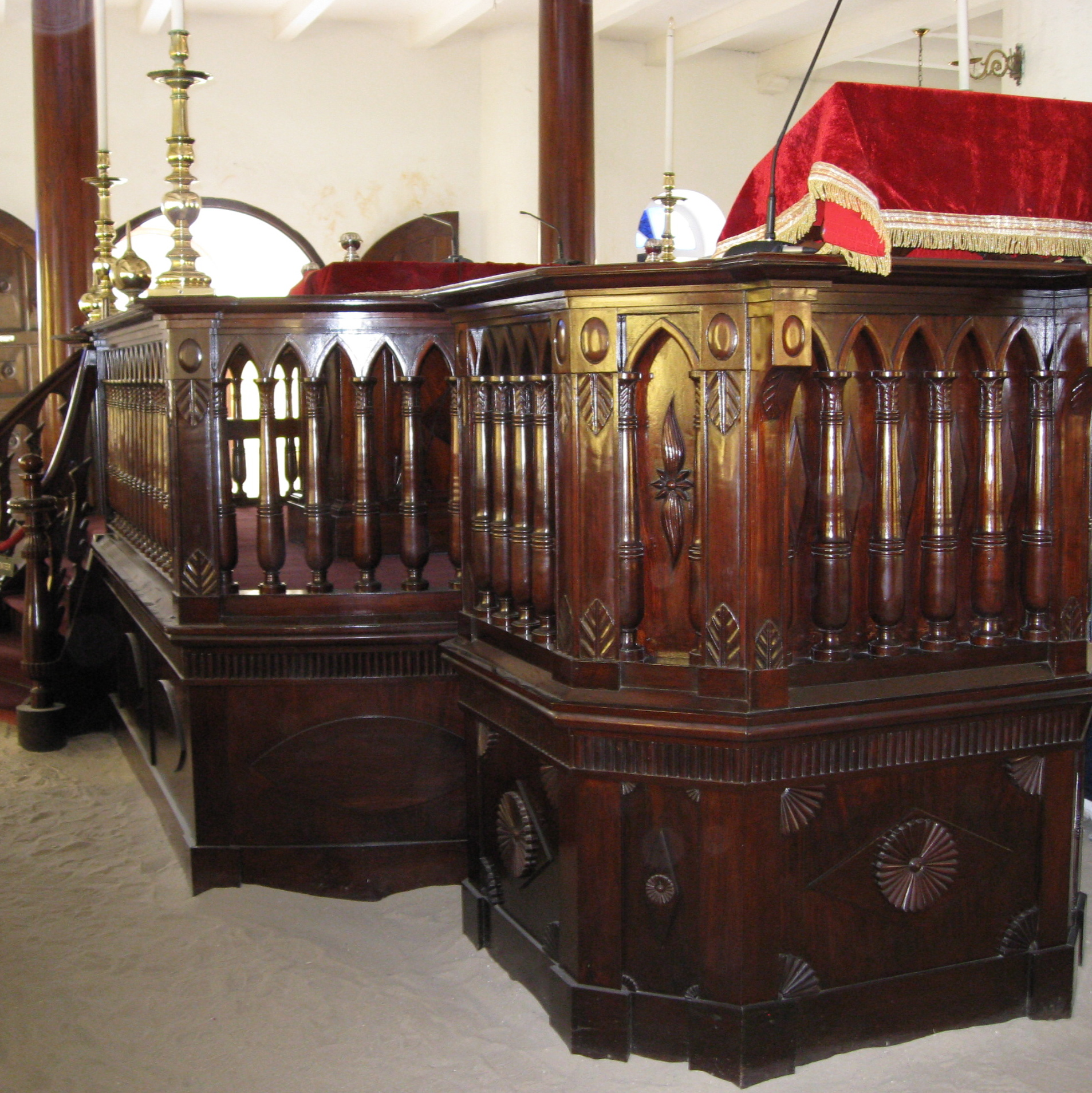
Mahogany bemah showing sand floor

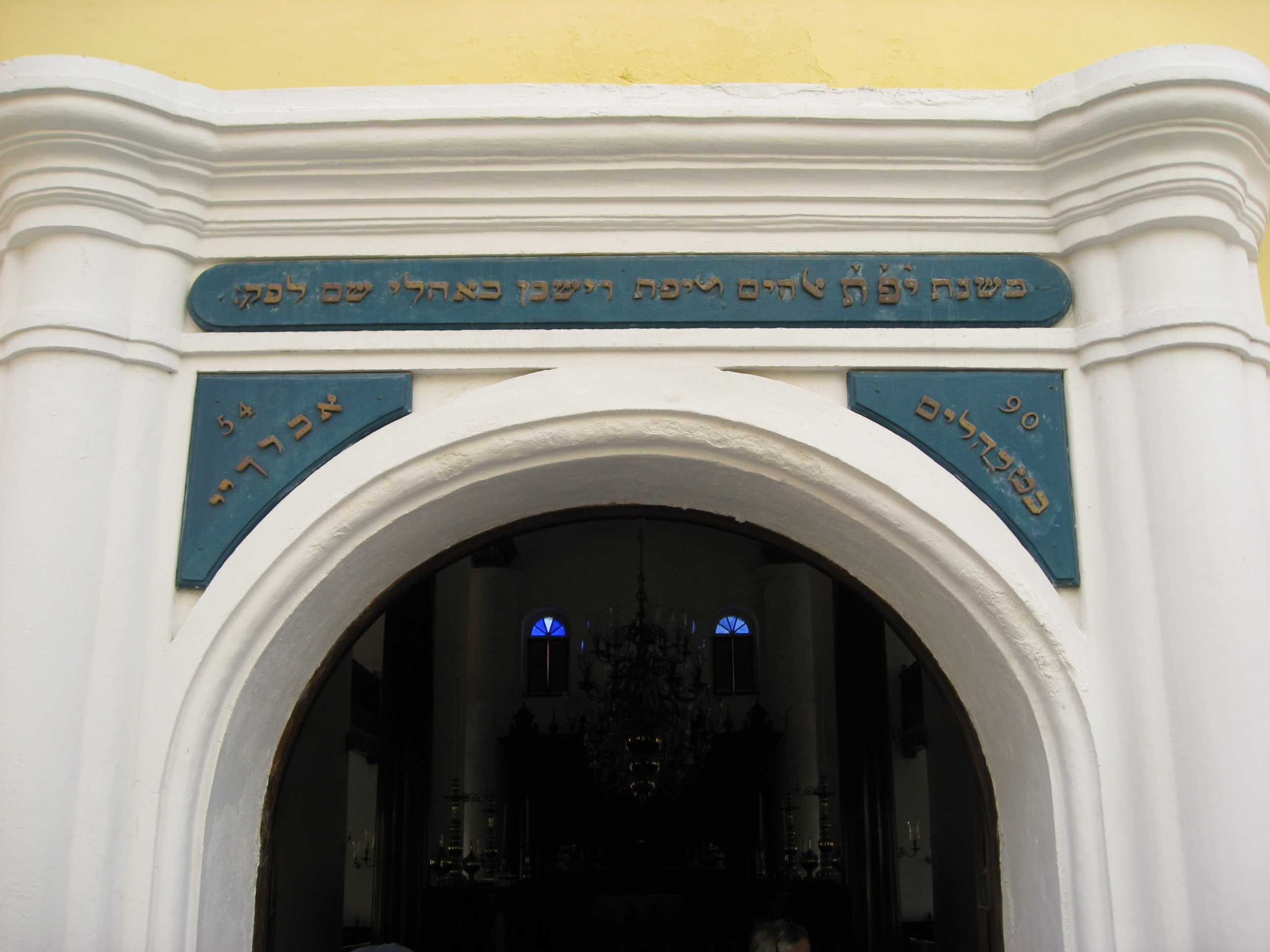
Western façade, Hebrew inscriptions over entrance: יַ֤פְתְּ אֱלֹהִים֙ לְיֶ֔פֶת וְיִשְׁכֹּ֖ן בְּאׇֽהֳלֵי־שֵׁ֑ם (the year the synagogue was built is 5490 according to the Hebrew calendar, 1730 on the Gregorian calendar). Underneath is written בְּ֝מַקְהֵלִ֗ים אֲבָרֵ֥ךְ יְהֹוָֽה׃

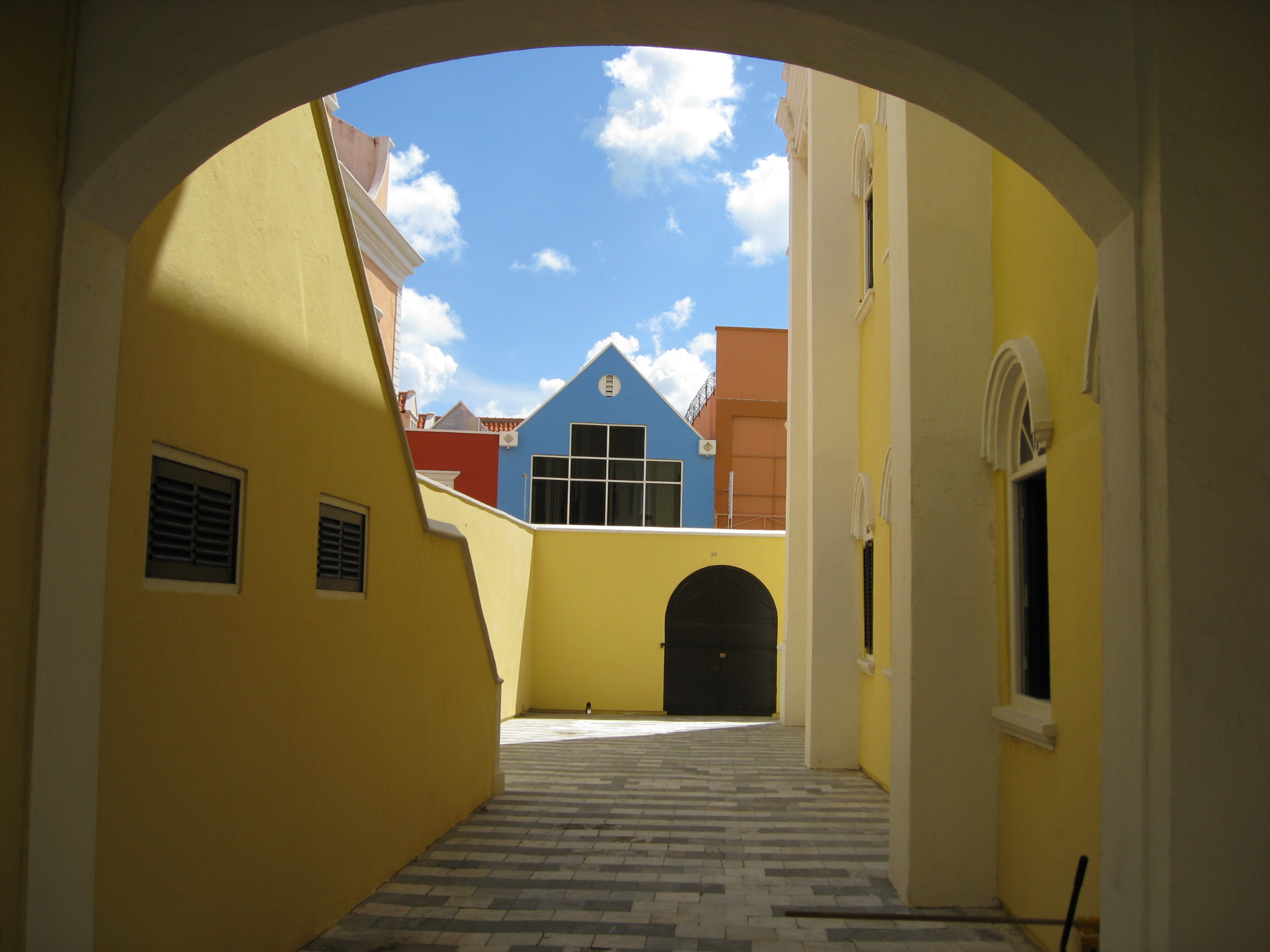
Courtyard view, looking outward

== See also ==
- History of the Jews in the Netherlands
- List of synagogues in the Netherlands
- History of the Jews in Curaçao
- Oldest synagogues in the world § South America and Caribbean
