= Alberto Couriel =

Uruguayan politician and economist (born 1935)

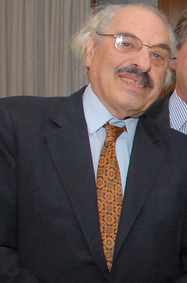
Alberto Couriel

Alberto Couriel Curiel (born 1935 in Juan Lacaze) is a Uruguayan public accountant and politician, belonging to the Broad Front coalition.

He served as Representative (1990–1995) and then as Senator (since 1995). He was a vocal critic of several finance ministers.

He has written several works on Latin American economics: De la democracia política a la democracia económica y social (1999), Globalización, democracia e izquierda en América Latina (1996), Pobreza y subempleo en América Latina (1983), and "La izquierda y el Uruguay del futuro"(2004).
