= Juan Alfonso Curiel =

Spanish academic

Juan Alfonso de Curiel (died 28 September 1609) was a Spanish professor of philosophy and theology at the University of Salamanca in Salamanca, Spain.

Curiel was born in Palenzuela, Burgos to Juan Curiel de la Torre, son of Juan de Curiel. He received his formal education at the University of Salamanca.

At Salamanca, Curiel was the tutor to John Barnes, the English Benedictine monk, and "was wont to call Barnes by the name of John Huss, because of a spirit of contradiction which was always observed in him."

After his death, much of his writing was published by Salamanca and the Complutense University of Madrid, including Controuersiarum Sapientiss in 1611.
