= Luis Curiel =

Spanish diplomat (1655–1724)

The Most Excellent Luis Curiel
- Born: Luis Francisco Curiel y Tejada; 11 October 1655; Seville, Spain
- Died: 27 November 1724 (aged 69); Madrid, Spain
- Education: University of Salamanca
- Spouse: Inés María Luna Delgado
- Children: Juan Curiel
- Honours: Order of Santiago

Seat S of the Real Academia Española
- In office 2 June 1714 – 27 November 1724
- Preceded by: Seat established
- Succeeded by: Tomás de Montes y Corral

Luis Francisco Curiel y Tejada (born 11 October 1655, Seville, Spain; died 27 November 1724, Madrid, Spain) was a Spanish lawyer, diplomat, Mayor of the House and Court, and knight of the Order of Santiago.

== Early life and education ==
He received his formal education at the University of Salamanca, studying law. On 25 February 1676, he qualified as a lawyer in the Chancellery of Granada. In 1677, he was appointed Poor Lawyer of the city of Seville and given the position of auditor of the Militias of the General Captaincy of the Kingdom of Seville.

== Law and public life ==
In 1683, he was appointed, by the Grand Inquisitor, a lawyer for the Royal Treasury of the Holy Office of the Kingdom of Seville. On 3 August 3, 1685, he became a lawyer of the city of Seville and on 4 February 4, 1687, he acted as the lawyer to the Archbishop of Seville.

In 1688, he was made lieutenant to Count of Montellano, a position he held until 1693. His next post was as deputy mayor of Cádiz from 18 June 1696. He remained there until 1 October 1699. After this long administrative and legal career, the new king, Felipe V, rewarded him, on 13 December 1700, as chief judge of degrees of the Audiencia of Seville. On 27 August 1703, he received the habit of the Order of Santiago.

From 19 February 1704, he became judge of degrees of the Seville Court. The King's need for trustworthy advises during the War of Succession gave Curiel a rise to the position of mayor of the House and Court in 1705, moving to Madrid to take office. Becoming one of the members of the Madrid high judiciary, he was consulted on several occasions as councilor of Castile and the Indies by the Chamber. Finally, on 20 August 20, 1707, Felipe V appointed him prosecutor of the Council of Castile, remaining in this position until the remodeling of the Council of Castile in 1713.

The restructuring of the Council of Castile, carried out in November 1713, provided him, on 10 November 1713, with a short-lived position as councilor of the Council of Castile.

From 17 June 1714, Luis Curiel occupied the S Chair of the Royal Spanish Academy on June 17, 1714, whilst his son Juan Curiel occupied the R Chair.

He was one of the first protectors, with his appointment in 1717, of the recently created University of Cervera, the only university in Catalonia after the War of Succession.

== Family ==
Curiel was born to Agustín Curiel Vega, ruler of the noble state of Osuna, while his mother, Catalina Tejada, was part of one of the noble families of Marchena. His son Juan Curiel was a politician. He married Inés María Luna Delgado on 28 December 1681, with whom he had four sons and two daughters. He died on 27 November 1724 in Madrid, Spain.
