= Moses Curiel =

Sephardic Jewish nobleman, diplomat, and merchant (1620–1697)

Don Moses Curiel
- Knight of the Royal Household of Portugal
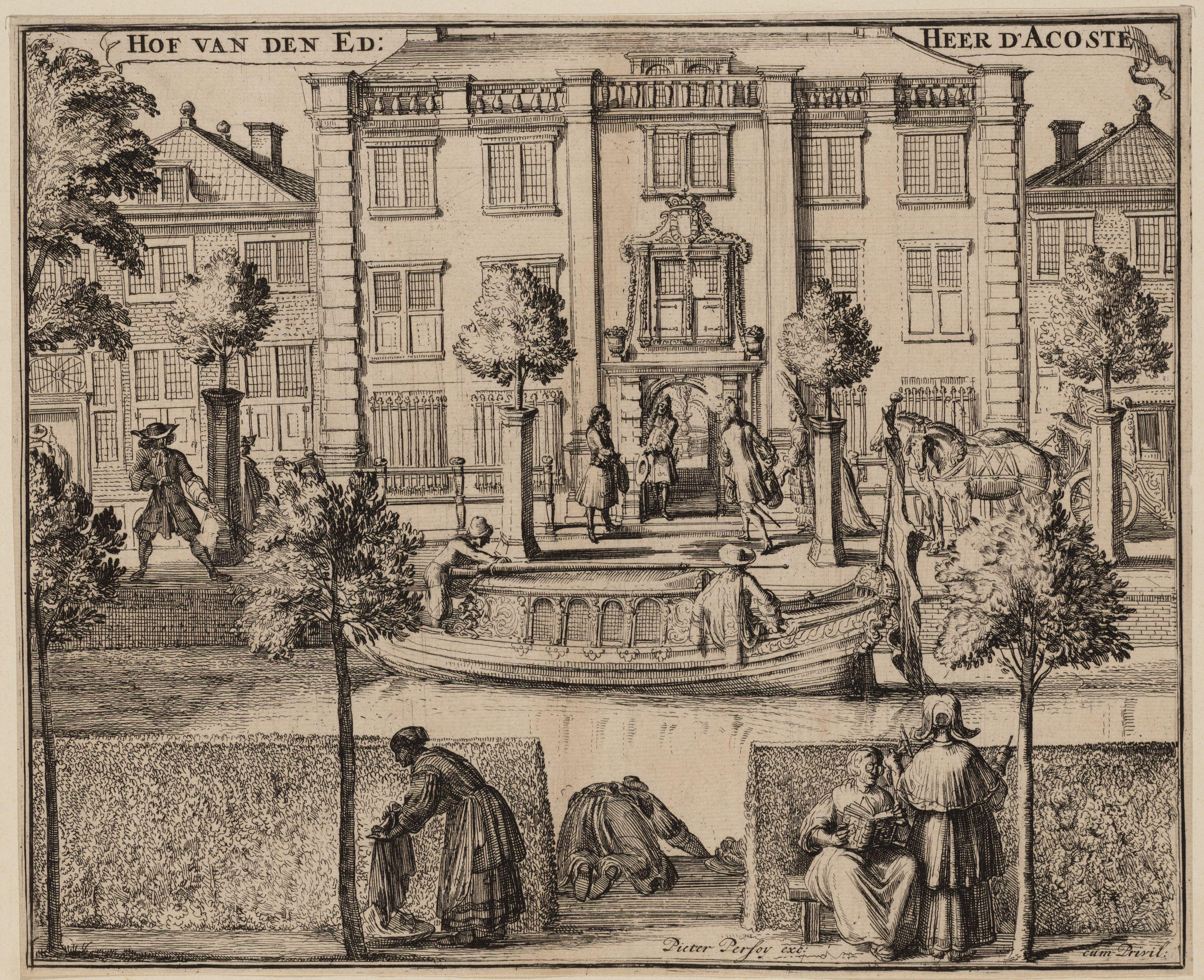
- Beschrijving Hof van den Ed: Heer d'Acoste
- Born: 1620; Florence
- Died: 1697 (aged 76–77)
- Noble family: Curiel
- Issue: Solomon Curiel; Nathan Curiel
- Father: Jacob Curiel
- Occupation: merchant, diplomat

Don Moses Curiel (1620–1697), in Dutch Mozes Curiël, alias Jeronimo Nunes da Costa, was a Sephardic Jewish nobleman, diplomat, and wealthy merchant, who traded in diamonds, sugar and tobacco.

Curiel was born in Florence; he was the eldest son of Jacob Curiel, alias Duarte Nunes da Costa. In 1627 the family moved to Hamburg. He was sent to be educated at Protestant Heidelberg University in Heidelberg, Germany. In 1642 he moved to Amsterdam, the Netherlands and served as Agent to the Portuguese Crown from 1645 until his death. In 1654 he lived on Sint Antoniesbreestraat and married Rabecka Abbas. During his time in Amsterdam he generously patronised Hebrew scholarship.

He was a major contributor to the Portuguese Synagogue, Amsterdam, built in 1675. From around 1687 he lived along the Nieuwe Herengracht where he had bought two plots in the year before. He was a close friend of William of Orange and housed him in Amsterdam on more than one occasion.

The Curiel family is widely believed to have been 'one of the richest and most important families in the Sephardic Diaspora in northwest Europe.' In 1984, the historian Jonathan Israel wrote a book charting Moses Curiel's life, An Amsterdam Jewish Merchant of the Golden Age: Jeronimo Nunes Da Costa (1620-1697), Agent of Portugal in the Dutch Republic.
