= Elias David Curiel =

Venezuelan poet and writer (1871–1924)

- Born: 9 August 1871
- Died: 28 September 1924 (aged 53)
- Education: Federal College
- Occupations: Poet, writer

Elias David Curiel (9 August 1871 – 28 September 1924) was a Venezuelan poet and writer. He is considered one of the most prominent Venezuelan poets of the 20th century.

== Career ==
Born in 1871, Curiel was the son of David Curiel and Exilda Abenatar de Curiel. He studied at the Federal College, where he was the founding director of Choir College and, with the poet Antonio José Hermoso, co-creator of a weekly newspaper, La Cantera. Curiel also served as editor-in-chief of the newspaper El Día.

Curiel was one of the first collaborators of the Corian weekly "El Obrero". He had poems published in the magazine El Cojo Ilustrado. In the edition N ° 347 (published in 1906) a complete page is dedicated to Curiel

Curiel was also the author of the lyrics of the anthem of the state of Falcón in Venezuela.
