= Juan Curiel =

Spanish intellectual & politician (1690–1775)

The Honourable Juan Curiel
- Born: Juan Antonio Curiel Luna y Tajada; 13 January 1690; Seville, Spain
- Died: 29 November 1775 (aged 85); Madrid, Spain
- Education: University of Salamanca
- Father: Luis Curiel

Seat R of the Real Academia Española
- In office 1 June 1714 – 29 November 1775
- Preceded by: Seat established
- Succeeded by: Antonio Mateos Murillo

Juan Antonio Curiel Luna y Tejada (born 13 January 1690 in Seville, Spain; died 29 November 1775 in Madrid, Spain) was a Spanish intellectual and politician who became the Minister of the Council of Castile and member of the secret Supreme Council of the Inquisition.

== Early life and education ==
His father was Don Luis Francisco Curiel y Tejada, an influential diplomat and member of the Council of Castile. He received his formal education at the University of Salamanca in Salamanca, Castile and León, but it is not known whether he received his doctorate.

== Culture and publishing ==
Curiel was a founding member of the Royal Spanish Academy and held the position of Chair of the R seat from 1714 to 1775, having been a member since 20 June 1714.

On 8 February 1752, he was appointed as "Printing Judge". In this position, he had complete control of what was allowed to be printed in Spain. In this position, he drew up regulations and kept notoriously tight control over what was published, making sure that books fit into the enlightenment ideals. Whilst making many enemies, he has influential in the publishing of some of the most important books in the Spanish-speaking world.

== Political career ==
On 3 September 1720, he received the Military Order of Calatrava, thanks to the services performed by his father, Luis Curiel. He was appointed head of the Seville Court on 24 March 1722, remaining in this position until his promotion to judgeship on 24 December 24 1729.

After seventeen years in Seville, on 24 September 1739, he was appointed by Felipe V mayor of the House and Court. He had to delay his journey to Madrid to swear in the hands of the regent of the Seville Court by a commission entrusted to him by the monarch. He did not serve as mayor for long, becoming prosecutor of the Justice Chamber of the Finance Council on 15 May 1741.

On 11 December 1745, he received the honour of councillor of the Council of Castile and, on 13 August 1746, the position of property councilor of Castile. By the end of his political career, he had held the highest judicial positions in Spain for over 20 years.

== Death ==
He retired from public life on 30 April 1769, with royal permission. Curiel died on 29 November 1775 in Madrid and was buried in the chapel of the Santísimo Cristo de los Milagros, in the parish church of San Martín of Madrid.
