= Jacob Curiel =

Portuguese nobleman and diplomat (1587–1664)

- Knight
- Born: 26 September 1587; Lisbon, Portugal
- Died: 3 April 1664 (aged 76); Hamburg, Germany
- Noble family: Curiel
- Father: Abraham Curiel
- Occupation: merchant, diplomat

Dom Jacob Curiel (26 September 1587 - 3 April 1664), known by his alias Dom Duarte Nunes da Costa, was a Sephardi Jewish merchant, diplomat, and nobleman.

Curiel was educated at the University of Coimbra and the University of Bologna. In 1618 he acquired a historically significant Tanakh in Pisa. Around 1620 he lived in Florence, where his son Moses Curiel was born. Around 1627 the family moved to Hamburg, Germany. Until 1640 he served as Agent to the Iberian Union, but then choose for the Portuguese Crown.

On 14 June 1641 Jacob Curiel was ennobled by John IV of Portugal.

In 1645 his son Moses Curiel was appointed as Agent of the Portuguese Crown in Amsterdam. Solomon Curiel, Moses Curiel's son, assumed the position of Agent of the Portuguese Crown in Hamburg after his father's death in 1697.
