= List of Latin American Jews =

Jewish immigration to Latin America began with seven sailors arriving in Christopher Columbus' crew. The Jewish population of Latin America is today (2018) less than 300,000 — more than half of whom live in Argentina, with large communities also present in Brazil, Chile, Mexico, Uruguay and Venezuela.

To be included in this list, the person must have a Wikipedia article showing they are Jewish from the indicated country of origin or must have references showing they are Jewish from the indicated country of origin and are notable.

The following is a list of some prominent Latin American Jews, arranged by country of origin.

== Argentina ==
- Ernesto Acher – musician-humorist, former member of the group Les Luthiers
- Marcos Aguinis – journalist/writer
- José Alperovich – former governor of the Tucumán Province
- Héctor Babenco – film director (Argentinian-born)
- Daniel Barenboim – conductor and pianist
- Tania Bíder – revolutionary fighter
- Marcelo Birmajer – writer
- Laszlo Biro – inventor of the ballpoint pen
- Jácobo Bolbochán – chess player
- Julio Bolbochán – chess player
- Tato Bores – comedian
- Daniel Burman – filmmaker
- Israel Adrián Caetano – film director
- Andres Cantor – sports commentator
- Sergio Chejfec – writer
- Mario Davidovsky – composer
- Alicia Dujovne Ortiz – writer
- Giora Feidman – klezmer musician
- Movsas Feigins – chess player
- Daniel Filmus – ex-Argentine Education Minister
- Paulino Frydman – chess player
- Juan Gelman – poet
- Alberto Gerchunoff – writer
- Max Glücksmann – pioneer of Argentine music and film industries
- Osvaldo Golijov – classical composer
- Guillermo Israilevich – football player of Israeli National Team (Jewish father)
- Martín Jaite – former tennis player
- Guido Kaczka – actor, show host
- Mauricio Kagel – classical composer
- Daniel Katz – former mayor of Mar del Plata
- Axel Kicillof – governor of Buenos Aires Province
- León Klimovsky – film director
- Miguel Lifschitz – mayor of Rosario (Jewish father)
- César Milstein – immunologist, Nobel prize
- Marcos Mundstock – musician-humorist of the group Les Luthiers
- Miguel Najdorf – chess player
- Gastón Needleman – chess player
- Carlos Núñez Cortés – musician-humorist of the group Les Luthiers
- David Pakman – political commentator
- Alicia Partnoy – writer
- Raquel Partnoy – painter
- José Pékerman – football manager
- Jiří Pelikán – chess player
- Melina Petriella – actress
- Alejandra Pizarnik – poet
- Isaías Pleci – chess player
- Julio Popper – engineer and colonizer of Tierra del Fuego
- Daniel Rabinovich – musician and member of Les Luthiers
- Ariel Rot – musician
- Cecilia Roth – actress
- Isaac Sacca – Sephardi Chief Rabbi of Buenos Aires
- Lalo Schifrin – composer
- Aaron Schwartzman – chess player
- Diego Schwartzman – tennis player
- Samuel Schweber – chess player
- Ana María Shua – writer
- Ariel Sorín – chess player
- Juan Pablo Sorín – football player
- Coti Sorokin – songwriter/musician/composer
- Ana Maria Stekelman – Tango choreographer
- Oscar Strasnoy – classical composer
- Jorge Telerman – ex-mayor of Buenos Aires
- Jacobo Timmerman – journalist
- Bernardo Verbitsky – novelist
- Eva Verbitsky Hunt – archaeologist
- Horacio Verbitsky – journalist
- Bernardo Wexler – chess player

== Bolivia ==
- Lene Schneider-Kainer – painter
- Paul Baender – chess player

== Brazil ==
- Davi Alcolumbre – senator and president of the Brazilian Senate
- Clara Ant – political activist and presidential adviser
- Jom Tob Azulay – film director
- Héctor Babenco – film director
- Leoncio Basbaum – physician and political activist
- Rafinha Bastos – comedian and TV host
- Moysés Baumstein – holographer, film/video producer, painter, writer
- Adriana Behar – beach volleyball player
- Samuel Benchimol – entrepreneur and Amazon pioneer
- Abraham Bentes – army commander
- Daniel Benzali – TV actor
- Marcelo Samuel Berman – physicist and writer
- Joel Birman – writer
- Eva Altman Blay – sociologist and politician
- Débora Bloch – actress
- Jonas Bloch – actor
- Bussunda – comedian
- Boris Casoy – journalist
- Otto Maria Carpeaux – literary critic
- Moyses Chahon – army commander
- Juca Chaves – comedian, composer and singer
- Victor Civita – journalist
- Arnaldo Cohen – pianist
- Gilberto Dimenstein – journalist
- Alberto Dines – journalist
- Dina Dublon – director
- Esther Dweck – government minister
- German Efromovich – entrepreneur
- Fritz Feigl – chemist
- Benny Feilhaber – professional football player
- Fortuna – singer and composer
- Vilém Flusser – philosopher
- Marcelo Gleiser – physicist and writer
- Betty Gofman – actress
- José Goldemberg – educator, physicist and minister
- Ida Gomes – actress
- Neiman Gracie – martial artist, member of the Gracie family
- Fernando Grostein Andrade – cinematographer
- Mario Haberfeld – racing driver
- Alexandre Herchcovitch – fashion designer
- Wladimir Herzog – journalist
- Luciano Huck – TV show host
- Roberto Justus – advertiser and TV host
- Isaac Karabtchevsky – musician and conductor
- Israel Klabin
- Jacques Klein – pianist
- Samuel Klein – entrepreneur
- Samuel Kicis – army commander
- Ithamara Koorax – jazz singer
- Miguel Krigsner – entrepreneur and environmentalist
- Celso Lafer – diplomat
- Cesar Lattes – physicist
- Gastão Rosenfeld – physicist
- Ruth Sonntag Nussenzweig – immunologist
- Herch Moysés Nussenzveig – physicist
- Jaime Lerner – politician (governor Paraná state), urban planner
- Alexandre Levy – musician
- Waldemar Levy Cardoso – field marshal
- José Lewgoy – actor and director
- Clarice Lispector – writer
- Gerson Levi-Lazzaris – ethnoarchaeologist
- Carlos Maltz – drummer of rock band Engenheiros do Hawaii
- Luísa Mell – presenter and animal activist
- Leopoldo Nachbin – mathematician
- Noel Nutels – public health physician and human rights activist
- Carlos Nuzman – sportsman and president of Olympic Committee
- Ivo Perelman – jazz saxophonist
- Olga Benário Prestes – German-born communist militant
- Paulo Ribenboim – mathematician
- Sultana Levy Rosenblatt – writer
- Edmond Safra – banker
- Jacob Safra – banker
- Joseph Safra – banker
- Moise Safra – banker
- Senor Abravanel – TV show host
- Eduardo Saverin – co-founder and CFO of Facebook
- Mario Schenberg – physicist
- Hertha Meyer – physicist
- Moacyr Scliar – writer
- Lasar Segall – artist
- Ricardo Semler – entrepreneur
- Dina Sfat – actress
- Alfredo Sirkis – politician and environmentalist
- Amir Slama – fashion designer
- Henry Sobel – rabbi, community leader
- Renata Sorrah – actress
- Márcio Stambowsky – martial artist
- Dan Stulbach – actor
- Luciano Szafir – actor
- Eva Todor – actress and dancer
- Didi Wagner – presenter
- Mauricio Waldman – sociologist and politician
- Eva Wilma – actress
- Yara Yavelberg – political activist
- Mayana Zatz – geneticist
- Benjamin Zymler – auditor-general

== Chile ==
- Baruch Arensburg – physical anthropologist
- Claudio Bunster – theoretical physicist
- Leo Corry – mathematician
- Julián Elfenbein – journalist, television host
- Daniel Emilfork – actor
- Leonardo Farkas – businessman
- Robert Frucht – mathematician
- Rodrigo Hinzpeter – Minister of Interior and Public Security (2010–2012)
- Tomás Hirsch – politician, businessman
- Alejandro Jodorowsky – film director
- Mario Luis Kreutzberger Blumenfeld – television host
- Ariel Levy – actor
- Nicolás Massú – tennis player
- Sergio Melnick – Minister of Planning (1987–1989)
- Israel Polack – businessman
- Karen Poniachik – Minister of Mining and Energy (2006–2008)
- David Rosenmann-Taub – poet and musician
- Sebastián Rozental – football player
- Leon Schidlowsky – composer and painter
- Claudio Spies – composer
- Miguel Schweitzer Walters – Minister of Foreign Affairs (1983–1983)
- Shmuel Szteinhendler – rabbi and regional director of Masorti Olami Latin America
- Volodia Teitelboim – lawyer, politician, and author
- Alberto van Klaveren – Minister of Foreign Relations (2006–2009)

== Colombia ==
- Jorge Isaacs – poet, novelist
- Andy Lassner – Colombian-American television producer
- James Martin Eder – industrialist, entrepreneur, pioneer
- Evaristo Sourdis Juliao – lawyer, diplomat, politic
- Ramon Gomez Portillo – journalist, writer, poet
- Saúl Balagura – artist, poet
- Sandra Bessudo – marine biologist
- Simón Brand – film director
- Eliana Rubashkyn – pharmacist, chemist
- John Sudarsky – senator
- Diana Golden – actress, playwright
- Isaac Lee – journalist, entrepreneur, television producer

== Costa Rica ==
- Eliécer Feinzaig Mint – politician
- Leslie Feinzaig – venture capitalist and technologist
- Luis Liberman – politician

== Cuba ==
- Ruth Behar – writer
- Israel Kantor – singer
- José Antonio Bowen – author and academic
- Fabio Grobart – Communist Party co-founder
- William Levy – actor
- Jose Miller – leader of the Cuban Jewish community
- Meyer Rosenbaum – rabbi and spiritual leader

== Dominican Republic ==
- Francisco Henríquez y Carvajal – President
- Pedro Henríquez Ureña – essayist, philosopher

== Ecuador ==
- Salomon Isacovici – businessman and writer

== El Salvador ==
- Juan Lindo – president (1841) (Jewish father)

== Guatemala ==
- Isaac Farchi – businessman and politician
- Francisco Goldman – author (Jewish father)
- Eduardo Halfon – author
- Alcina Lubitch Domecq – author
- Gert Rosenthal – diplomat
- David Unger – author

== Honduras ==
- Juan Lindo – president (1847) (Jewish father)
- Jaime Rosenthal – Honduran businessman and politician (Jewish father)

== Nicaragua ==
- Herty Lewites – Nicaraguan politician

== Panama ==
- Eric Arturo Delvalle – president
- Ricardo Maduro – Honduran president (Panamanian-born)

== Paraguay ==
- Alfredo Seiferheld – writer
- Carlos Schvartzman – musician

== Peru ==
- Eliane Karp – First Lady of Peru
- Pedro Pablo Kuczynski – President of Peru
- Salomón Libman – football player
- David Waisman Rjavinsthi – second Vice President of Peru, member of the congress for Alianza Parlamentaria party
- Yehude Simon – Prime Minister of Peru

== Puerto Rico ==
- Quiara Alegría Hudes – (Jewish father) author, playwright. Wrote the book for Broadway's musical In the Heights. Her play, Elliot, a Soldier's Fugue, was a Pulitzer Prize finalist in 2007
- Axel Anderson – actor/director, Anderson made his debut in Puerto Rican television with a sitcom named Qué Pareja a local version of I Love Lucy
- David Blaine – magician, Blaine is also an endurance artist and Guinness Book of Records world record-holder
- Mathias Brugman – leader in Puerto Rico's independence revolution against Spain known as El Grito de Lares (Lares' Cry)
- Julio Kaplan – Puerto Rican chess player and former world junior champion
- Marco Katz Montiel – composer for Zoey's Zoo and trombonist with Charlie Palmieri and Mon Rivera
- Raphy Leavitt – composer, director and founder of "La Selecta"
- Manny Lehman – DJ and producer
- Ari Meyers – actress, best known for her role as Emma Jane McArdle in the Kate & Allie (1984) TV series
- Micol Ostow – author of "Emily Goldberg Learns to Salsa" and "Mind Your Manners, Dick and Jane"
- Joaquin Phoenix – actor, was nominated for the Academy Award for Best Supporting Actor, Gladiator in 2000 and in 2005, he was nominated for the Best Actor Oscar, and won a Golden Globe in the same category in 2006 for his role as Johnny Cash in Walk the Line
- Geraldo Rivera – journalist
- Sally Jessy Raphael – syndicated talk show host
- Jorge Seijo – Puerto Rican radio and television personality
- Brenda K. Starr – salsa singer, her seventh album, Atrevete a Olvidarme, titled, "Tu Eres" earned her a nomination by the Billboard Latin Music Awards in 2006
- A. Cecil Snyder – Chief Justice of the Supreme Court of Puerto Rico
- Nina Tassler – President of CBS Entertainment
- Rachel Ticotin – actress, starred in Critical Condition, Where the Day Takes You Falling Down Total Recall and in Con Air, where she earned an ALMA Award for her role as prison guard Sally Bishop
- Sahaj Ticotin – vocalist/guitarist from the rock band Ra

== Uruguay ==
- Monsieur Chouchani – mysterious scholar
- Gisèle Ben-Dor – conductor
- Jorge Drexler – singer-songwriter (Jewish father)
- Ricardo Ehrlich – mayor of Montevideo
- Gabe Saporta – singer-songwriter/bassist of Cobra Starship and Midtown
- Carlos Sherman – writer (Jewish father, Uruguay-born)
- Orlando Petinatti – radio host

== Venezuela ==
- Isaac Abadí Abbo – architect
- Yitzchak Abadi – rabbi
- Harry Abend – sculptor
- Lolita Aniyar de Castro – lawyer and politician
- Ivonne Attas – actress and politician
- Huáscar Barradas – flutist, composer
- Lionel Belasco – composer, musician
- Baruj Benacerraf – immunologist, Nobel Prize in Medicine, 1980
- Margot Benacerraf – film director
- Sara Bendahan – Venezuelan physician who was the first Venezuelan woman to complete her medical degree in Venezuela
- Amador Bendayán – actor, comedian
- Alegría Bendayán de Bendelac – writer, professor and poet
- Jose Beracasa Anram – entrepreneur, sportman
- Manuel Blum – computer scientist
- Carlos Brandt – writer, philosopher
- Jacques Braunstein – economist, publicist, disc jockey
- Jacobo Brender – writer
- Pynchas Brener – Ashkenazi Chief Rabbi of Caracas
- Vytas Brenner – composer, musician
- Gerardo Budowski – chess master
- Carlos Capriles Ayala – writer and journalist
- Henrique Capriles Radonsky – politician and lawyer
- Jacobo Capriles – film director
- Miguel Ángel Capriles Ayala – journalist
- Renato Capriles – band leader and composer
- Teo Capriles – cyclist and singer
- Ilan Chester – composer, pop singer
- Isaac Chocron – writer
- Fernando Chumaceiro, trader. industrialist, politician
- Salomon Cohen Levy – engineer
- Elias Crespin, painter
- Leo Corry – mathematician
- Elias David Curiel – poet
- Jose Curiel – politician
- Morris Elias Curiel – politician
- Susana Duijm – Miss World 1955, model, actress
- Daniel Elbittar – actor, model and entertainer
- Sammy Eppel – internationalist
- Alicia Freilich – writer, novelist, journalist
- Paulina Gamus – politician
- Gego – sculptor
- Reynaldo Hahn – composer (Jewish father)
- Daniela Hammer-Tugendhat – Austrian art historian
- Joanna Hausmann – comedian, YouTuber
- Michel Hausmann – theater director and producer
- Ricardo Hausmann – politician, professor, academic
- Lya Imber – first woman in Venezuela to obtain the degree of Doctor of Medicine (Paediatrics & Child Care Specialist) and the first female member of the board of the Medical School of the Federal District
- Sofía Ímber – journalist
- Jonathan Jakubowicz – film director, writer, and producer
- Karina – pop singer
- Moisés Kaufman – screenwriter, director
- Betty Kaplan – film director
- Geula Kohen Moradov – painter
- Ruth de Krivoy – former president of the Central Bank of Venezuela
- Andres Levin – musician
- Heriberto Lobo – banker, sugar trader and financier
- Julio Lobo – sugar trader and financier
- Yucef Merhi – artist, poet
- Moisés Naím – journalist, economist
- Elias Mocatta – banker, financer
- Edgardo Mondolfi Gudat - historian and writer
- Isaac J Pardo – writer, poet
- Jacobo Penzo – film director
- Edilio Peña – play writer, poet
- Israel Peña- musicologist
- Teodoro Petkoff – guerrilla fighter and politician, journalist, economist
- Maja Poljak – social activist and photographer
- L. Rafael Reif – engineer, president of Massachusetts Institute of Technology
- Flor Roffé de Estévez – composer and writer
- Ángel Rosenblat – philologist
- Maurice Ruah – tennis player
- Benjamin Siegert – phisicyan, inventor of Angostura bitter
- Eduardo Schlageter – painter
- Veronica Schneider – actress
- David Smolansky – politician, Voluntad Popular, mayor of El Hatillo, Miranda State
- Henrique Salas Römer – politician, former Carabobo State governor
- Leon Schorr – master chess player
- Ariel Segal – writer and scholar, correspondent of BBC in Israel
- Isaac Senior – trader founder of Casa Senior of Coro
- Rosalinda Serfaty – actress
- André Singer P. – geologist, director of FUNVISIS
- Shirley Varnagy – journalist, Globovisión TV host
- Abdul Vas – contemporary artist
- Ernesto Villegas Poljak – journalist, politician
- Vladimir Villegas Poljak – journalist, politician
- Geula Zylberman – abstract painter

== See also ==
- History of the Jews in Mexico
- History of the Jews in Latin America
- List of Jews
