= Polish Brazilians =

Polish-related residents in Brazil

- (Brazil) (Poland)
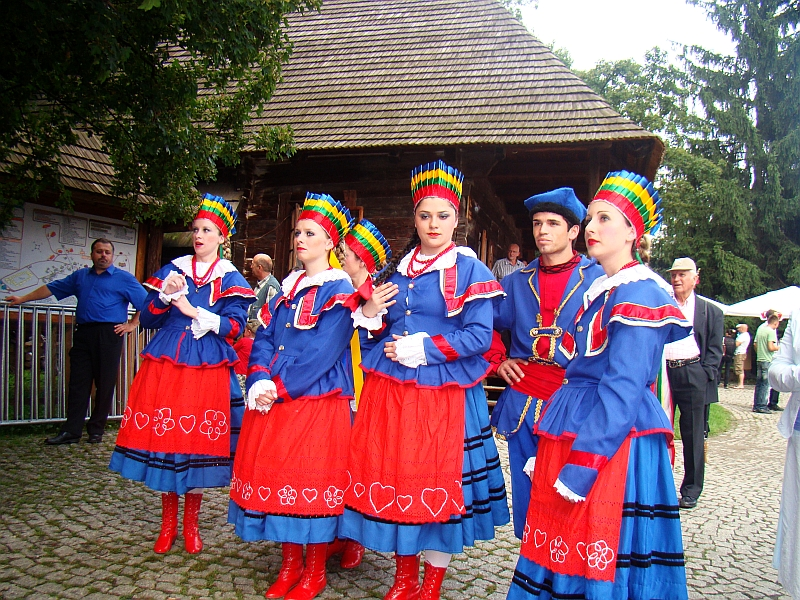
- Polish descendants in Curitiba.

Total population
- 2 million

Regions with significant populations
- Brazil: Mainly Southern and Southeastern Brazil Brazilian diaspora in Canada: Toronto and Montreal; Argentina: Misiones; and Paraguay: Itapúa.

Languages
- Portuguese · Polish · Russian (Historically) · Yiddish

Religion
- Roman Catholicism (ethnic Poles) · Judaism (Polish Jews) · Minor: Islam (Polish Tatars)

Related ethnic groups
- Russian Brazilians, Ukrainian Brazilians, Lithuanian Brazilians, White Brazilians, White Latin Americans

Polish Brazilians (Portuguese: polono-brasileiros, Polish: Polonia brazylijska) refers to Brazilians of full or partial Polish ancestry who are aware of such ancestry and remain connected, to some degree, to Polish culture, or Polish-born people permanently residing in Brazil. Also, a Polish Brazilian may have one Polish parent.

Polish immigrants began arriving in Brazil in the late 19th century and their total number was estimated at around 200,000.

== Immigration ==
The first Polish immigrants arrived in the port of Itajaí, Santa Catarina, in August 1869. They were 78 Poles from the area of Southern Silesia. Commandant Redlisch, of the ship Victoria, brought people from Mitteleuropa to settle in Brusque.

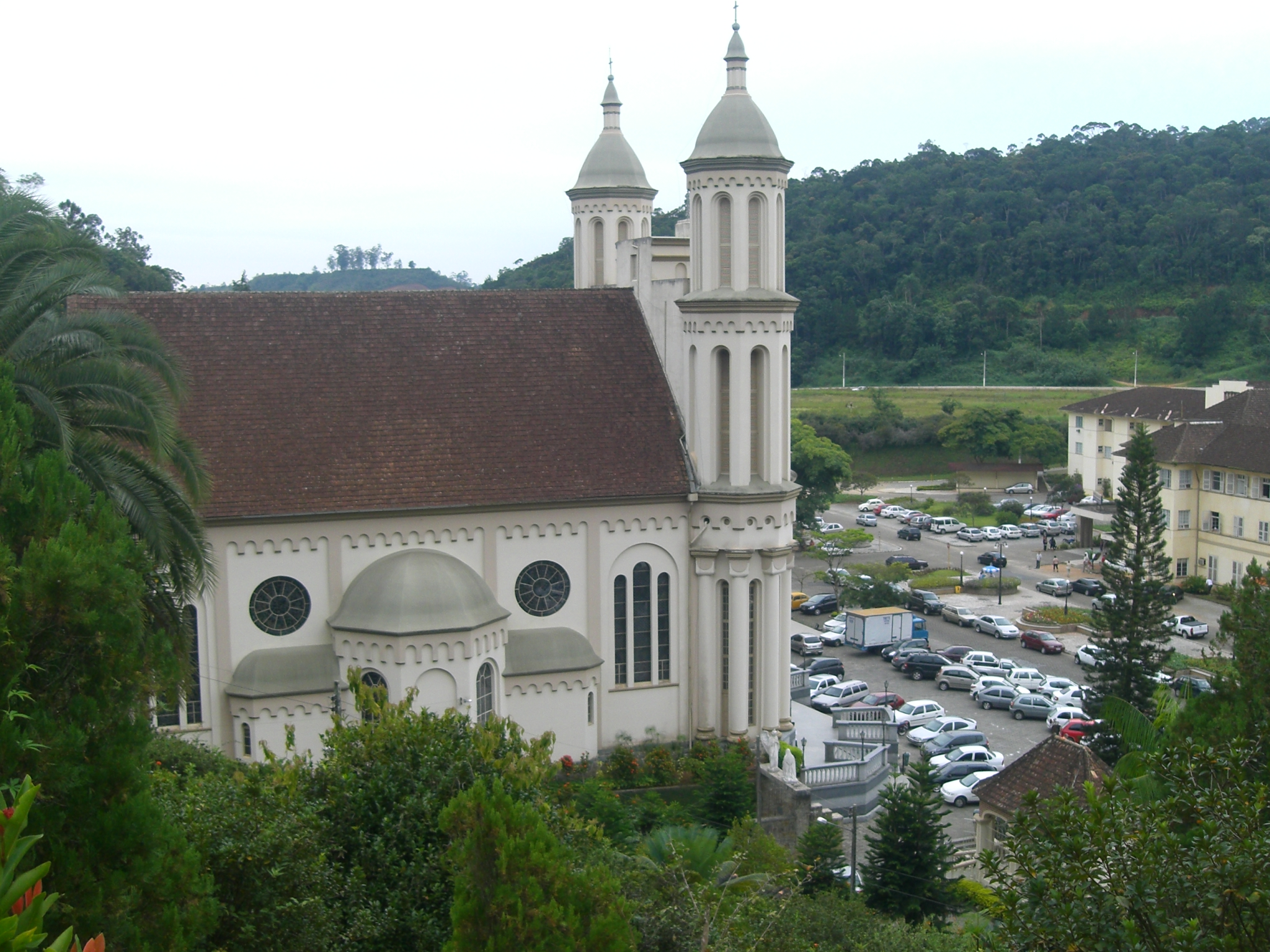
Brusque, in the State of Santa Catarina, received many Polish immigrants.

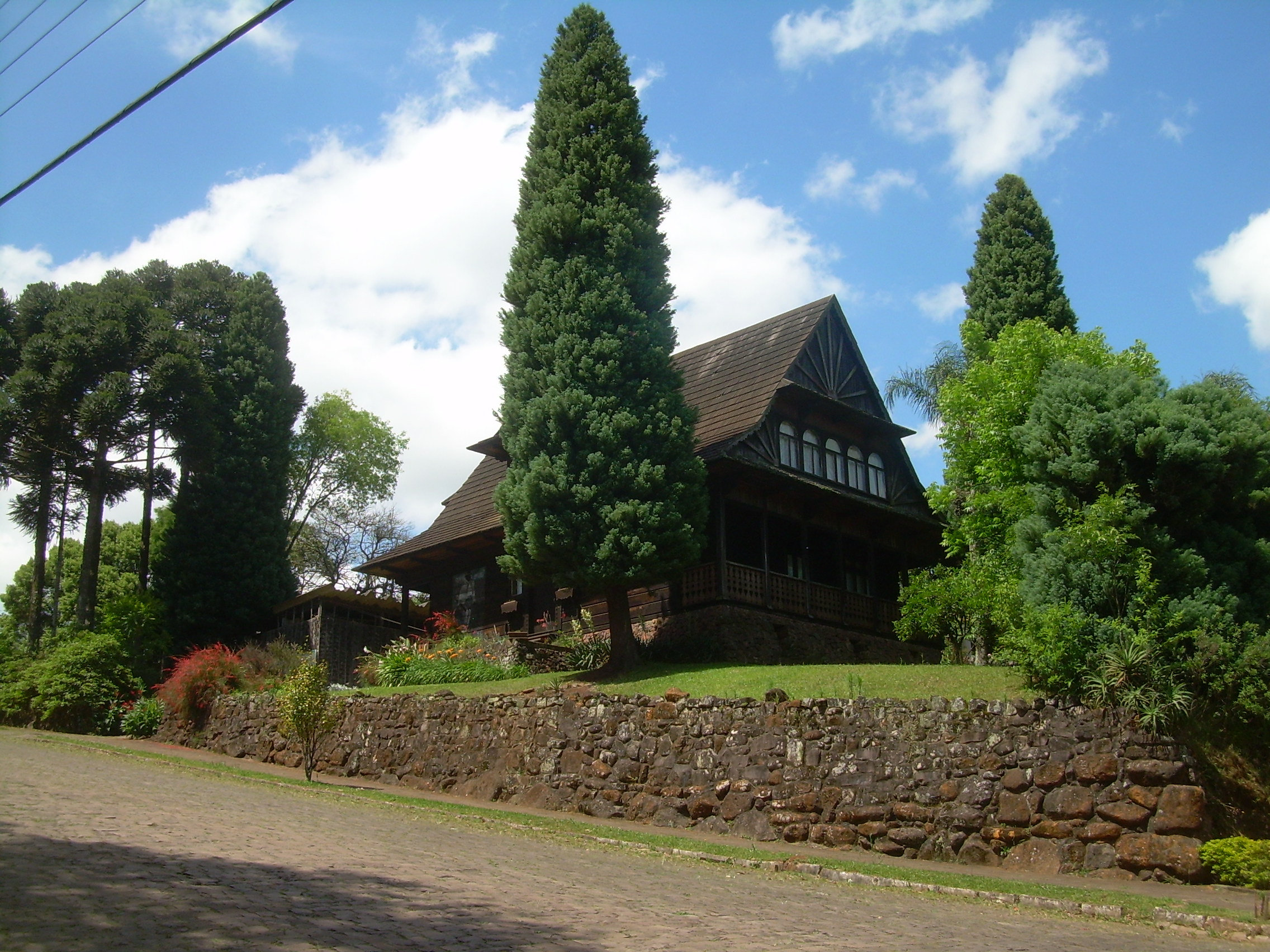
Polish house in Nova Prata, Rio Grande do Sul.

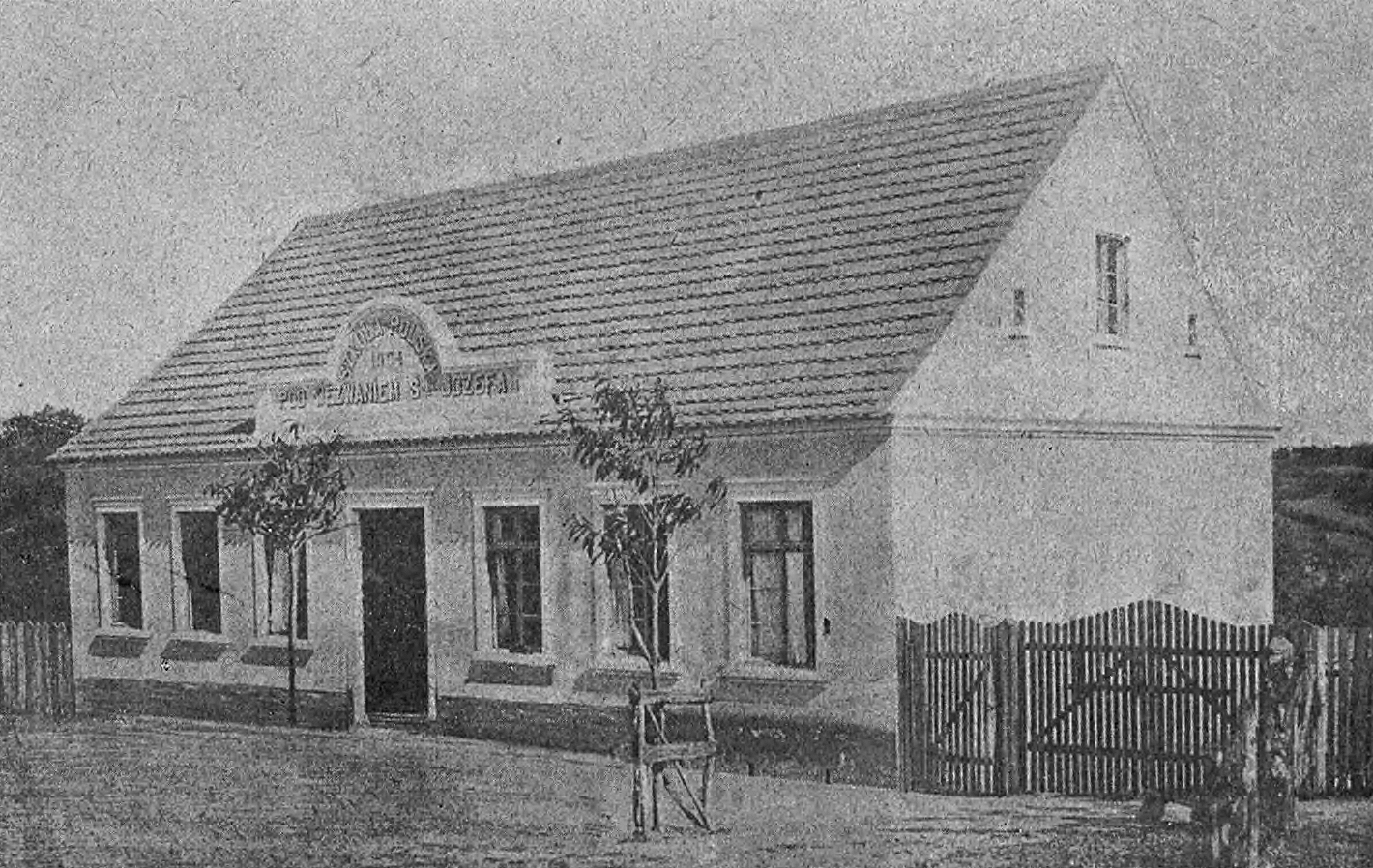
School of Polish migrants in Abranches, Paraná - beginning of 20th century

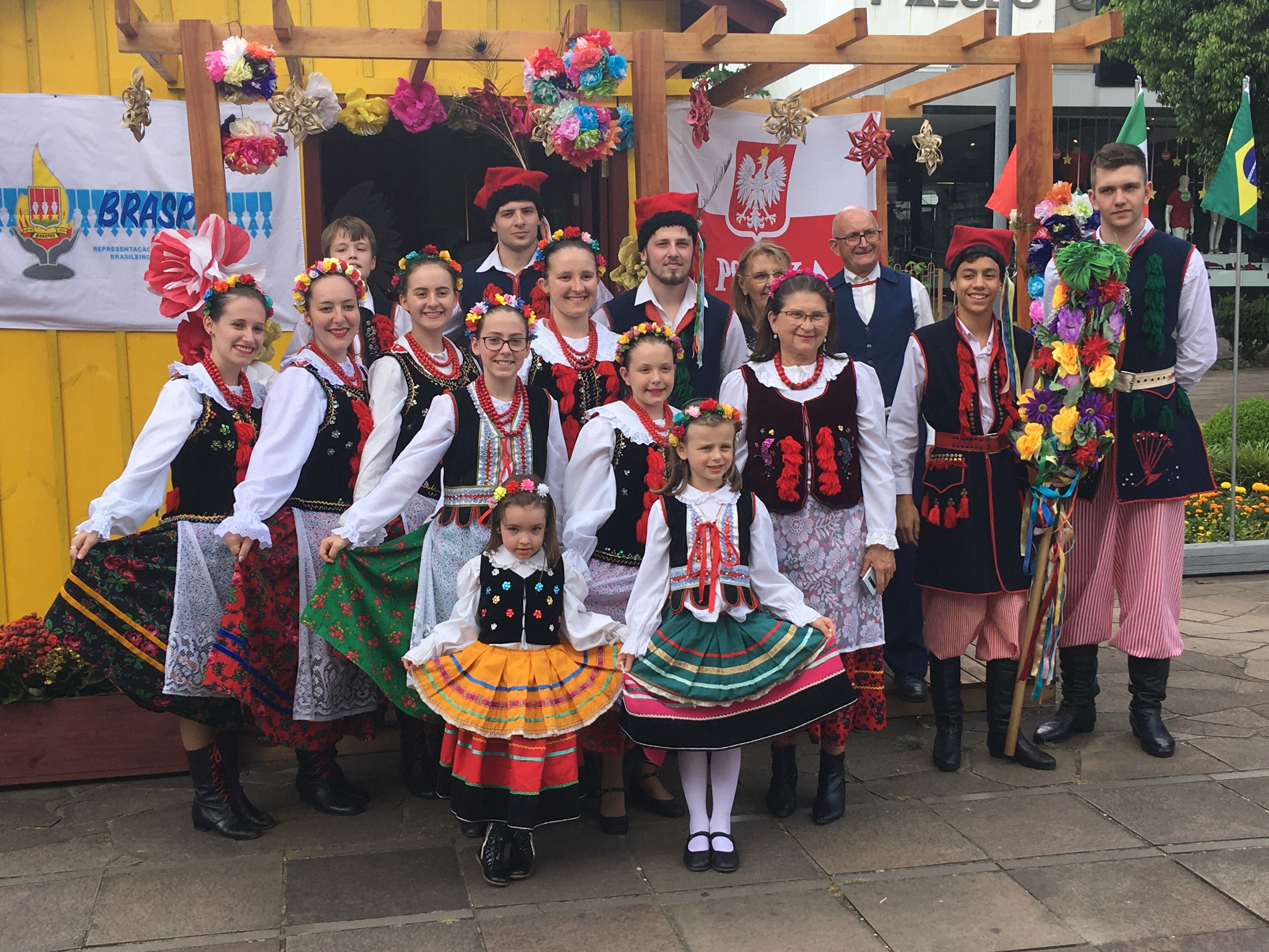
Polish ancestry in Nova Prata, Rio Grande do Sul.

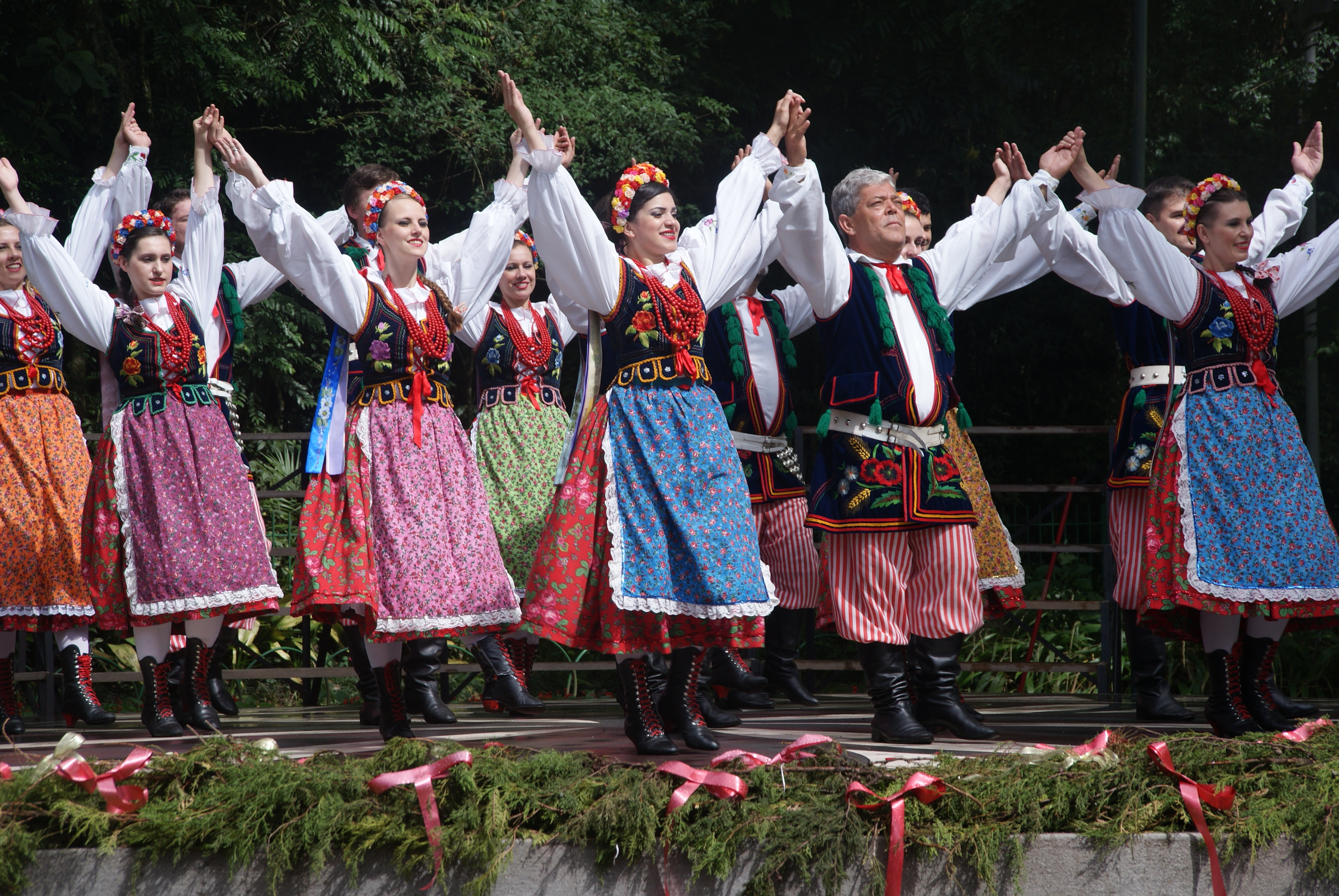
Polish festival in Curitiba.

They were in total 16 families, among them: Francisco Pollak, Nicolau Wós, Boaventura Pollak, Thomasz Szymanski, Simon Purkot, Felipe Purkot, Miguel Prudlo, Chaim Briffel, Simon Otto, Domin Stempke, Gaspar Gbur, Balcer Gbur, Walentin Weber, Antoni Kania, Franciszek Kania, André Pampuch and Stefan Kachel. The Poles were placed in the colonies Príncipe Dom Pedro and Itajaí, in the area of Brusque.

Fewer Poles immigrated to Brazil than Portuguese or Italians. From 1872 to 1917 (Act of 5th November), 110,243 "Russian" citizens entered Brazil - in fact, the vast majority of them were Poles, since Polish lands situated east of Prosna river was under Russian rule as Congress Poland, thus ethnic Poles immigrated with Russian passports. West of Poland was part of the German Empire, therefore these Poles migrated as German citizens.

The State of Paraná received the majority of Polish immigrants, who settled mainly in the region of Curitiba, in the towns of Mallet, Cruz Machado, São Matheus do Sul, Irati, Rebouças, Rio Azul and União da Vitória.

Most Polish immigrants to Southern Brazil were Catholics who arrived between 1870–1920 and worked as small farmers in the State of Paraná. Others went to the neighboring states of Rio Grande do Sul and Santa Catarina and São Paulo. After the 1920s, many Polish Jews immigrated seeking refuge from Europe, settling mainly in the State of São Paulo. Today most Brazilian Jews are of Polish origin.

In 1871, with the help of Father Antônio Zieliński, well connected in the court of Dom Pedro II, in Rio de Janeiro, Wos-Saporski, later nicknamed the "Father of Polish Colonization in Paraná", obtained permission from the emperor for this group (as German citizens), already expanded (32 families), could migrate to the Pilarzinho colony in the region of Curitiba, thus founding the first Polish colony in Brazil with the support of the government of Paraná.

Until June 1873, 809 Polish immigrants arrived in Paraná, of which 454 were provisionally lodged in Curitiba. In September 1873, another 64 families (258 people) disembarked in Santa Catarina and again with the help of Wos-Saporski and the authorization of Frederico José Cardoso de Araújo Abranches, then president of the Province of Paraná, they settled 6 km from Curitiba in the current Abranches neighborhood.

In 1875 about two thousand Poles lived on the outskirts of Curitiba. In 1877 the number had already jumped to six thousand immigrants. Thanks to the action of Adolfo Lamenha Lins, who presided over the province of Paraná between 1875 and 1877, there was a synchrony between the colonization of the territory, rural development and immigration. Lamenha understood the difference between spontaneous and official immigration, so, during his government, he encouraged the establishment of new immigrants in Paraná by funding their journey from the ports of Paranaguá and São Francisco do Sul to Curitiba and by creating several colonial agricultural centers. He also invested in infrastructure and access, enabling the movement of goods and ensuring the supply of foodstuffs to nearby markets. In the last report sent to the Legislative Assembly (1877), Lins states that six thousand immigrants lived on the outskirts of the capital. The most important colonies founded at this time were: Santa Cândida (1875), Orleans (1875), Thomas Coelho (Araucária - 1876), Santo Inácio (1876), Dona Augusta (1876), Lamenha (1876), D. Pedro II ( 1876), Riviere (1877).

In 1878, the colonies Murici, Zacarias, Inspetor Carvalho and Coronel Accioly were created. Also in 1878, 28 Polish immigrant families settled in Colônia Moema, in the municipality of Ponta Grossa. Soon after, more families arrived in the municipality, creating new colonies: Taquari, Guaraúna, Rio Verde and Itaiacoca.

In 1907, a school was founded in Ponta Grossa that catered to the needs of Polish children, in a space attached to the Sant'Ana Chapel and directed by the Servas do Espírito Santo sisters. In 1908 the school had more than 50 Polish students. The school closed in 1933. In 1937 Paraná had 167 Polish ethnic schools. The first school run by a Polish immigrant in Paraná was opened in October 1876 by Jerônimo Durski in the Orleans colony, in Curitiba.

In 1934, the Maritime and Colonial League (Liga Morska i Kolonialna, LMiK) founded the Morska Wola agricultural colony, in the municipality of Cândido de Abreu. In 1939 the colony had 195 families, approximately 700 people, most of them Polish.

1886 is considered the starting point of Polish immigration in the state of Rio Grande do Sul. A group of 300 immigrants, unable to adapt to the climate of the state of Bahia, where they first headed, migrated to the north of Porto Alegre and founded the Santa Teresa and Santa Bárbara colonies. In 1888, they were demarcated from the lots of the Mariana Pimentel Colony, which received the first waves of Polish immigrants the following year. In 1890 a group of Polish immigrants arrived in Porto Alegre who headed for the town of São Feliciano, the current municipality of Dom Feliciano. Most were from Kongresówka (the part of Poland occupied by Russia). The immigrants received lots and started making houses, planting crops and raising animals. They were very religious, and the first things they built were chapels.

In this first phase, few Polish settlers settled in Santa Catarina due to the climate and "hostile territory" (inhabited by Indigenous Brazilians). They did not live well with the German colonies, which were predominant in the region. Santa Catarina was at the time a province of passage, where immigrants disembarked at the port of Itajaí but headed mainly for Paraná and Rio Grande do Sul.

In 1873, around 60 Polish families (as German citizens) arrived in Espírito Santo from Prussia, Pomerania and Silesia (from the Wrocław region), and together with the Germans, they settled mainly in Santa Leopoldina and Santa Teresa. According to Brazilian sources, from 1876 onwards, the colonization of the 25 de Julho River valley, located in the lower part of the Santa Teresa mountain range, towards the Rio Doce, began, primarily by Italian, German and Swiss immigrants. The following year, Poles occupied the lands along the 5 de Novembro River, starting the colony called Patrimonio dos Polacos or Santo Antônio dos Polacos. In the north of Espírito Santo, the city of Águia Branca, which received its name for being the symbol of Poland, is founded by the association called Colonizing Society of Warsaw.

== Religion ==
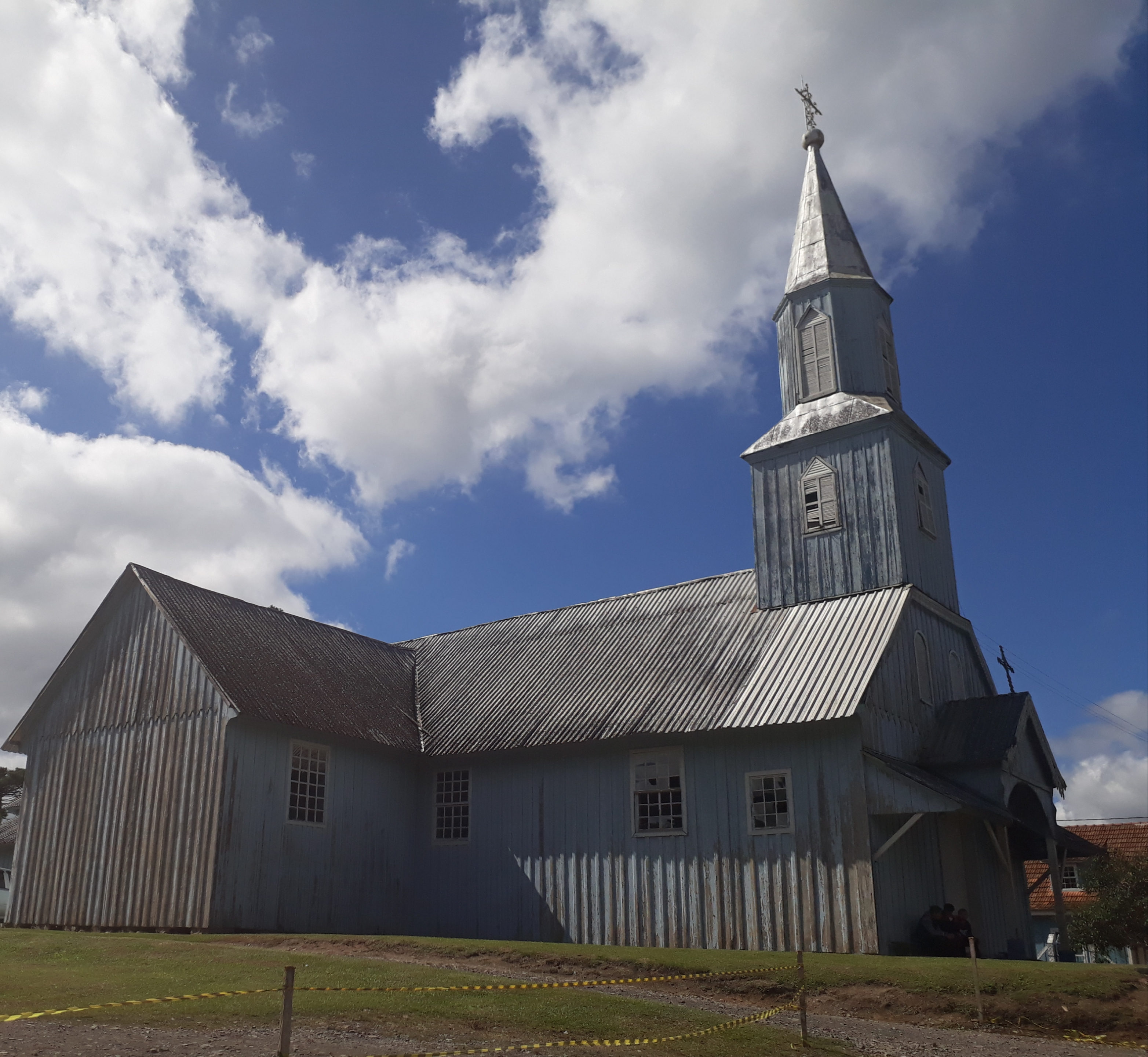
São José Catholic Church in Água Branca, in the Municipality of São Mateus do Sul, Paraná, Brazil.

In a 1991 poll with Polish immigrants residents in Southeastern Brazil, 48.5% reported to be Jewish, 36.4% Catholic, 10.7% adherents of other religions and 4.5% non-religious.

== Polish culture in Brazil ==
The State of Paraná still retains a strong influence from the Polish culture. Many small towns have a majority of Polish descendants and the Polish language is spoken by some of them, although nowadays most Polish Brazilians only speak Portuguese. The city of Curitiba has the second largest Polish diaspora in the world (after Chicago) and Polish music, dishes and culture are quite common in the region. Curitiba was largely influenced by former mayor Jaime Lerner.

== Polish communities ==
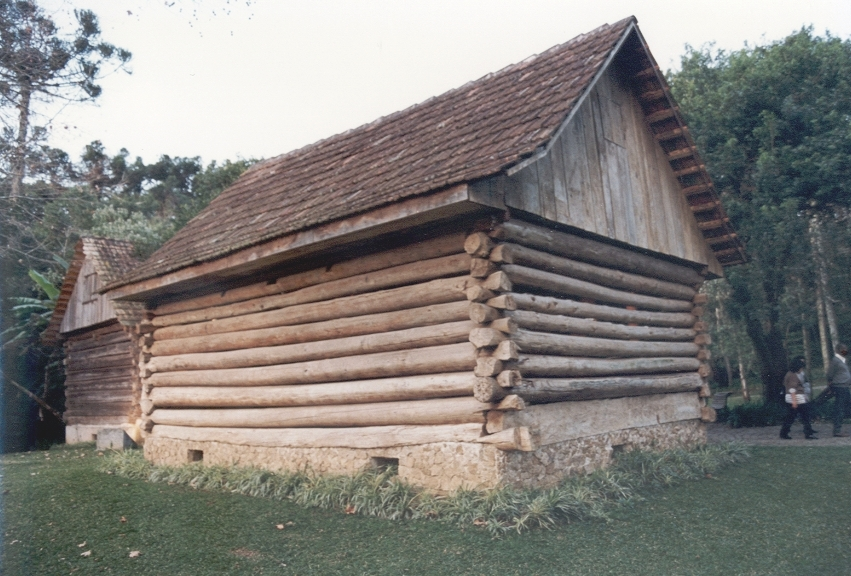
Polish old architecture in Curitiba.

Important Polish communities include:

- Paraná: Eufrosina, São Mateus do Sul, Santa Bárbara, Prudentópolis, Ivaí, Apucarana, Cândido de Abreu, Castro, Piraí do Sul, Palmeira, Cruz Machado, Guarapuava, Irati, Curitiba and others.
- Santa Catarina: Lucena (current Itaiópolis), Rio Vermelho, Massaranduba, Grã-Pará, Nova Galícia, Brusque and others.
- Rio Grande do Sul: Alfredo Chaves (now Veranópolis), Antônio Prado, Bento Gonçalves, Dom Feliciano, Mariana Pimentel, Ijuí, Guaraní das Missões, Áurea, Gaurama, Alpestre, Jaguari, Erechim, and others.
- São Paulo: São Bernardo do Campo, Pariquera-Açu, Rio Claro, São Paulo, and others.
- Espírito Santo: Águia Branca, Santa Leopoldina, and others.

== Notable Polish Brazilians ==
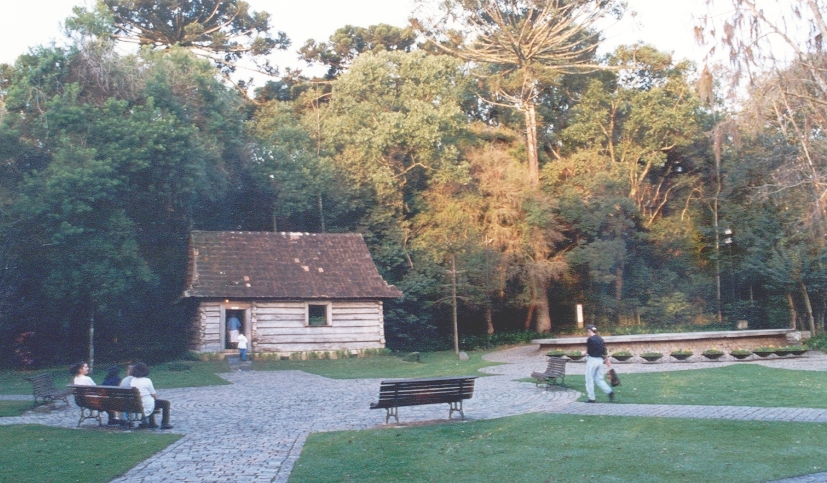
A Polish old-style house in Paraná.

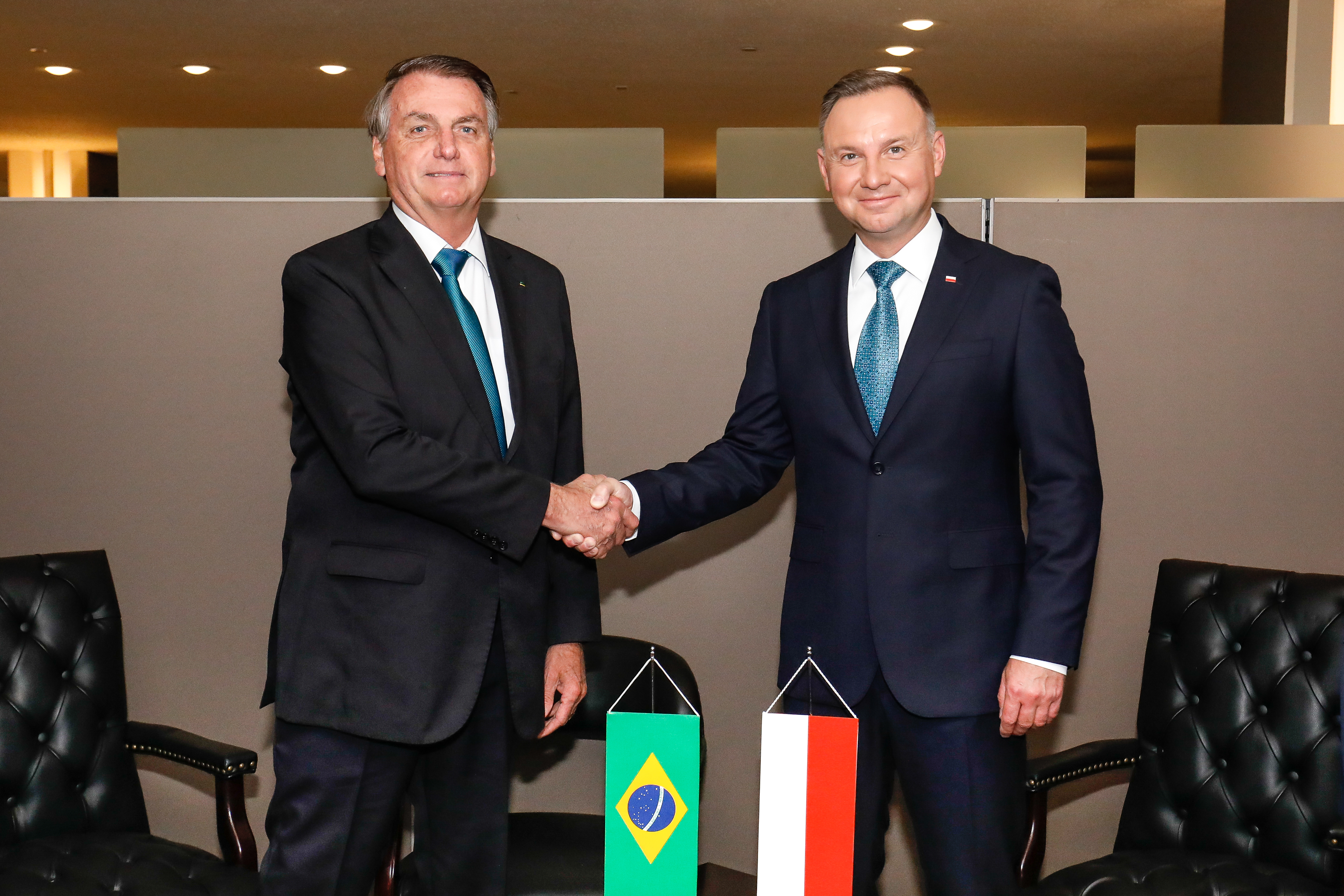
Polish Andrzej Duda and Jair Bolsonaro.

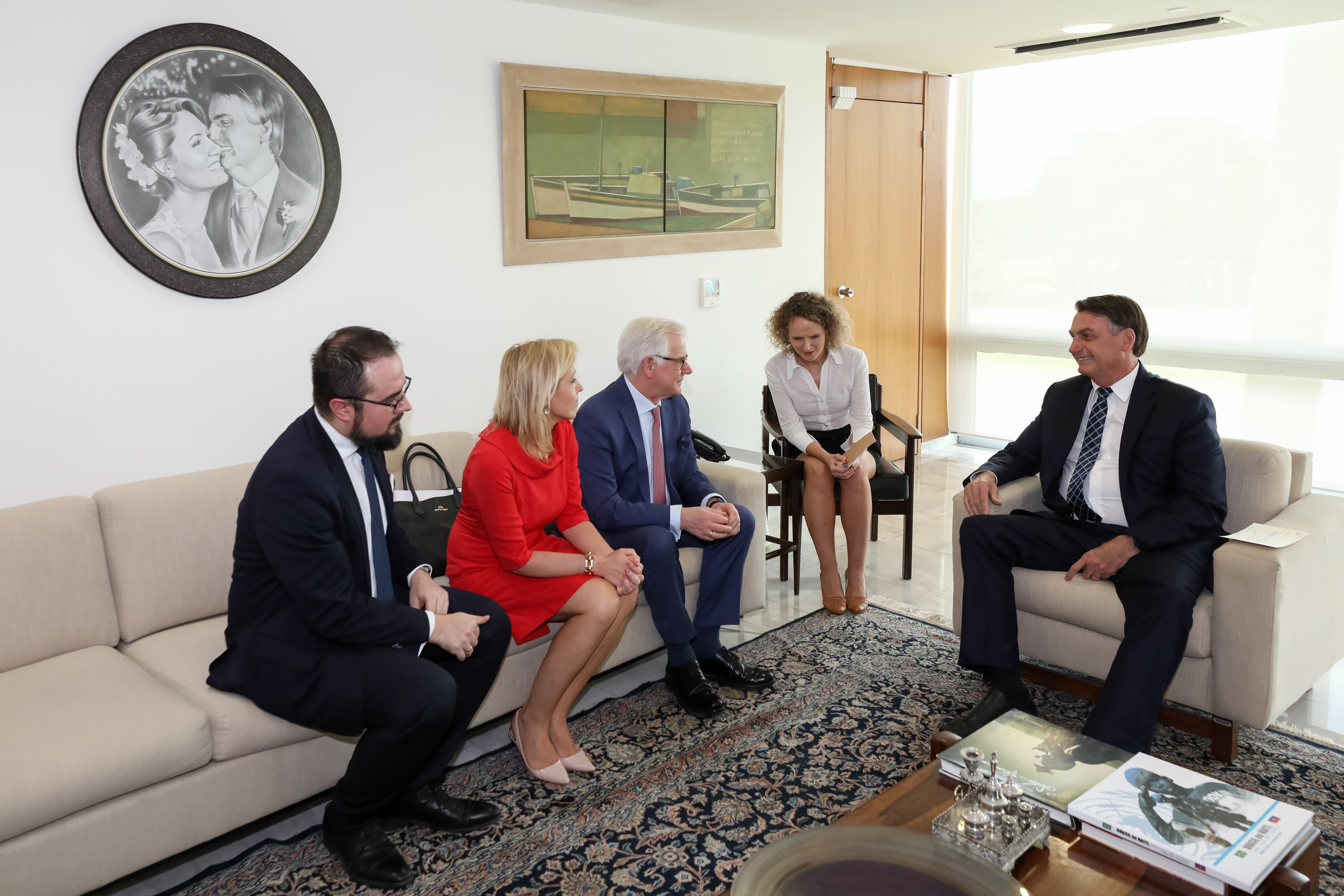
Polish Jacek Czaputowicz visiting Brasília.

- Alessandra Ambrosio, supermodel. She was born in Erechim, Rio Grande do Sul.
- Alexandre Herchcovitch, fashion designer. He is from a Jewish orthodox family, and was born in São Paulo.
- Angélica Ksyvickis, Lithuanian, Polish and Ukrainian descent, Rede Globo hostess, actress and singer. She was born in Santo André, São Paulo.
- Berta Loran, actress. She was born in Warsaw, Poland.
- Dan Stulbach, Brazilian actor of Polish Jewish descent. He was born in São Paulo.
- Edson Zwaricz, footballer. He was born in União da Vitória, Paraná.
- Elias Gleizer, Brazilian actor of Polish Jewish descent. He was born in São Paulo.
- Henrique de Curitiba, Zbigniew Henrique Morozowicz, composer. He was born in Curitiba, Paraná.
- Ida Gomes, actress. She was born in Kraśnik, Poland.
- Jaime Lerner, politician. He was born in Curitiba, Paraná.
- Letícia Wierzchowski, novelist and screenwriter. The author of the popular "A Casa das Sete Mulheres" series of historical novels, she was born in Rio Grande do Sul
- Mizuho Lin singer of the Brazilian melodic death metal band Semblant.
- Maurício Waldman, environmentalist. He was born in São Paulo.
- Paulo Leminski, poet and writer. He was born in Curitiba, Paraná.
- Paulo Szot, Tony Award-winning opera singer and actor. He was born in São Paulo.
- Pedro Luiz Napoleão Chernoviz, physician, scientific writer and publisher. He was born in Łuków, Poland.
- Xuxa, German, Austrian, Italian, and Polish descent, Rede Globo hostess and Latin Grammy Award-winning singer. She was born in Santa Rosa, Rio Grande do Sul.
- Serginho Groisman, Polish mother, Rede Globo´s "Altas Horas" show host. He was born in São Paulo.
- Francisco Lachowski, model. He was born in Curitiba, Paraná (Polish father)
- Samuel Klein, founder of Casas Bahia and philanthropist. A Holocaust survivor, Klein emigrated to São Caetano do Sul.
- Ricardo Lewandowski, minister of Brazilian supreme court. He was born in Rio de Janeiro.
- Thaís Pacholek, actress. She was born in Curitiba.
- Thiago Rangel Cionek, footballer. He was born in Curitiba.
- Vicente Mickosz, radio broadcaster. He was Born in Curitiba.
- Filipe Luís Kasmirski, footballer. He was born in Jaraguá do Sul, Santa Catarina.
- Leandro Narloch, journalist and writer. He was born in Curitiba, Paraná state .
- Rudolf Komorek, missionary declared Venerable in 1995
- Ariane Lipski, mixed martial artist born in Curitiba who fights in the UFC. Her grandfather migrated to Brazil from Poland before World War II for security reasons.
- Bento (footballer), professional footballer who plays as a goalkeeper for Saudi Pro League club Al-Nassr and the Brazil national team.
- Alemão, professional footballer who plays as a forward.
- Thiago Dombroski also known as Thiagão, professional footballer who plays as a centre–back.
- Marcos Kwiek, volleyball coach.
- Marcelo Fronckowiak, volleyball coach
- Marcel Mendes-Dudziński, professional footballer who plays as a goalkeeper

== The image of Polish Brazilians in Polish culture ==
Polish writer Maria Konopnicka published in 1910 a poem Mister Balcer in Brazil (Pan Balcer w Brazylii). Balcer fails to assimilate and returns to Poland. Mieczysław Lepecki had visited several South American countries, including Brazil, preparing mass emigration from Poland, and published several books about South America. Kazimierz Warchałowski returned to Poland and published there books about Brazil.

== See also ==
- Brazil–Poland relations
- Morska Wola
- Maritime and Colonial League: Attempted Polish overseas possessions
- Polish diaspora
