= List of University of Valle people =

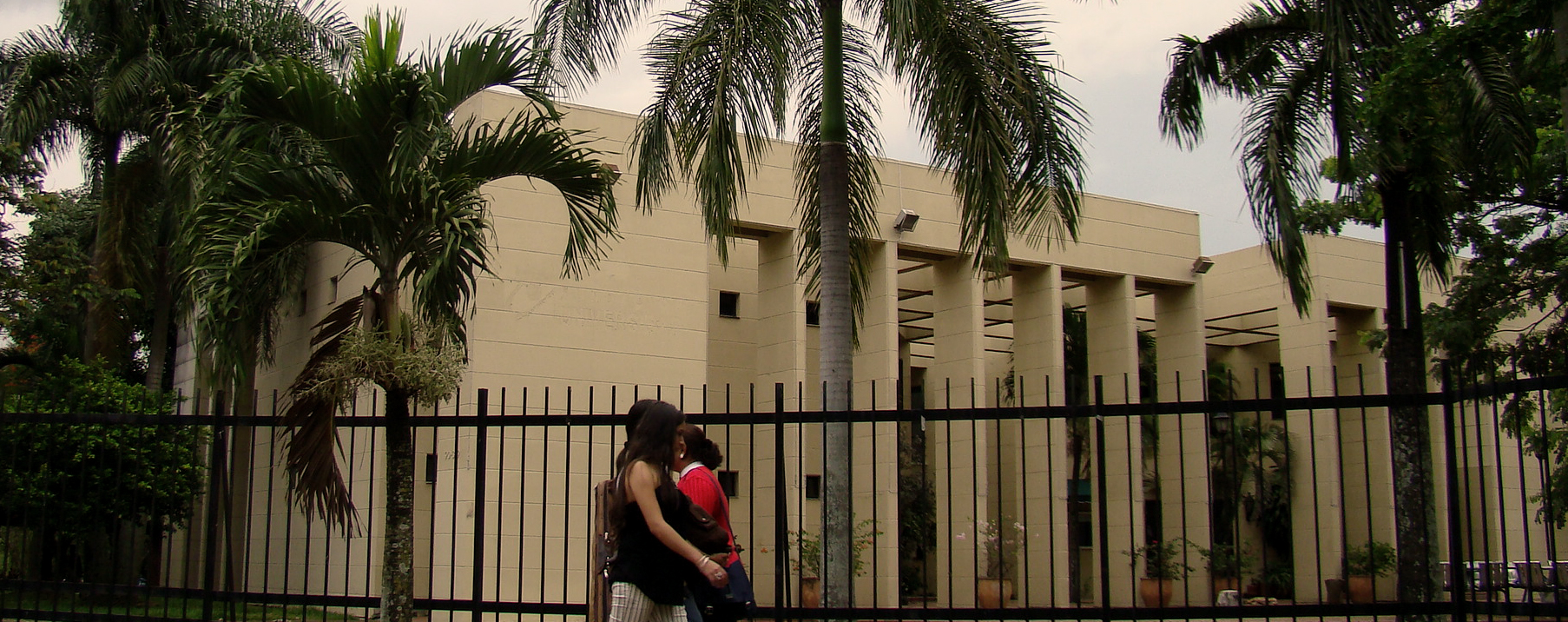
University of Valle

This is a list of people associated with the University of Valle, Colombia. This list includes nationally or internationally notable alumni, current or previous faculty and staff members, and its former rectors. The University of Valle is a public, departmental, coeducational, research university based primarily in the city of Cali, Valle del Cauca. It is the largest higher education institution by student population in the southwest of the country, and the third in Colombia, with more than 30,320 students. Each year, about 2,300 undergraduate and 600 postgraduate students finish their studies.

== Notable alumni ==
- Sabas Pretelt de la Vega
- Antonio Navarro Wolff
- Saúl Balagura
- Dilian Francisca Toro
- Gustavo Álvarez Gardeazábal
- Andrés Caicedo
- Alba Lucía Potes Cortés
- Carlos Barbosa
- Sandra Bessudo
- Mauro Castillo
- Raúl Cuero
- José Fernando Escobar
- Reinaldo Rueda
- Claudia Blum
- Mary Jane West-Eberhard
- Estanislao Zuleta
- José Santacruz Londoño
- Susan Bernal
- Marleyda Soto
- Bárbara Muelas
