= Kicis =

Kicis is a surname. Notable people with the surname include:

- Bia Kicis (born 1961), Brazilian politician
- Samuel Kicis (1913–1984), Brazilian Army general
