= Katherine Miranda =

Colombian politician (born 1986)

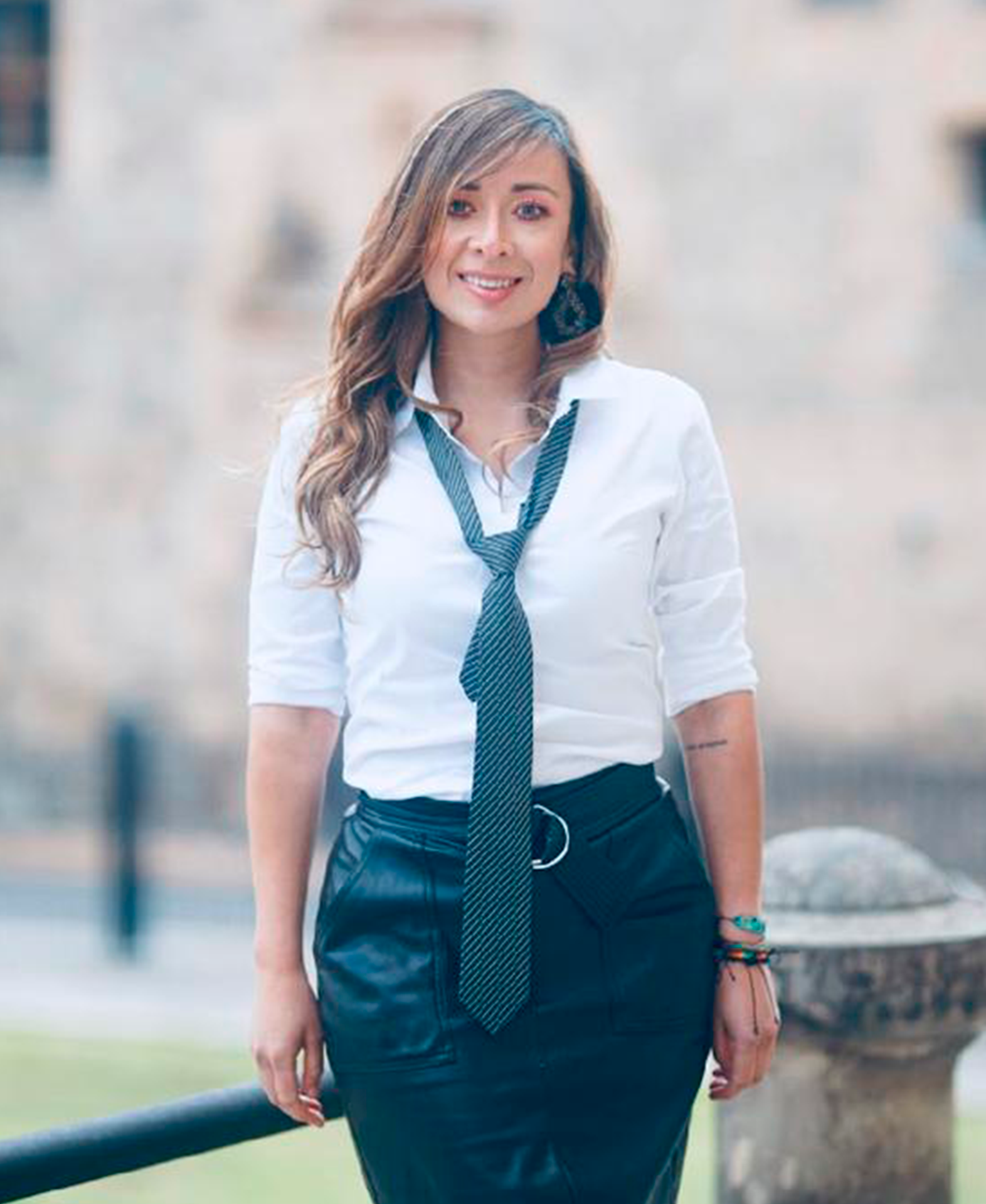
- Miranda outside the National Capitol

Member of the Chamber of Representatives
- Incumbent
- Assumed office July 20, 2018
- Constituency: Capital District

Personal details
- Born: Luvi Katherine Miranda Peña; December 14, 1986 (age 39) Bogotá, Colombia
- Party: Green Alliance
- Children: 1
- Education: Del Rosario University; University of Barcelona
- Website: Chamber website

Luvi Katherine Miranda Peña (born December 14, 1986) is a Colombian political scientist and political activist with studies in identity and conflict and with academic immersion in Culture of Peace, Social Cohesion and Intercultural Dialogue from the University of Barcelona, Spain. She participated in Antanas Mockus' presidential campaign in 2010 and for years she dedicated himself to defending the peace process between the Colombian state and the FARC guerrillas, carried out in Havana, Cuba between 2012 and 2016. In 2018 she was elected as a member of the Congress of the Republic of Colombia, in the Chamber of Representatives of Colombia, for the period of 2018 and 2022.

== Early life and education ==
Miranda was born in Bogotá, from a very young age interested in just causes, equality and social justice, she ventured into the world of politics serving as an advisor to the youth of the green party also called "The Green Wave" between 2008 and 2009 a A year later, in 2010, she would serve as a youth advisor for the Antanas Mockus campaign.

During the years 2011 to 2015 Miranda worked as chief of staff of then Senator John Sudarsky during his stay in this role, projects mainly focused on electoral transformation were carried out.
