= Ramon Gomez Portillo =

Ramón Raimundo Gómez Portillo (1874–1948) Poet and journalist born in Ocaña, North of Santander, Colombia. Son of Ramón Gómez Garcia and Anselma Portillo Quintero. Close relative of Laureano Gomez Castro, the former President of Colombia. He was the first journalist in Ocaña and published "El Escalpelo", a weekly newspaper that used to be an acid critic of the government. The first issue of El Escalpelo was published in Ocaña on January 19, 1933. Ramón Raimundo Gómez is the grand father of journalist and TV producer Alvaro Eliyahu Bayona Gómez, a recognized webmaster and editor in chief of "Tora Tropical", a Jewish newspaper published in Yonkers, New York.

== Sources ==
Source: Archivo General de la Nacion de Colombia. "1933 D1S1 MP2-4000 El Escalpelo: periodico eventual de critica/ Ramon R. Gomez P., director propietario".
