= Alicia Freilich =

Venezuelan writer

Alicia Freilich (born 15 March 1939) is a Venezuelan writer, novelist, journalist and educator.

== Early life ==
Born in Caracas, Alicia Freilich is the eldest of three girls born to Máximo Freilich and Rebeca (née Warszawska) Freilich, immigrants of Polish-Jewish origin. She grew up in a Jewish home and attended Universidad Central de Venezuela, where she received a bachelor's degree in literature in 1960.

== Professional career ==
Freilich began her journalism career at El Nacional in 1969, working since then on a column about literature and reporting politics, with a focus on children and family issues, among other subjects. She gravitated toward stories that featured real-life struggles of ordinary people, with profile articles that have garnered national feature-writing awards and international honors. In between, she worked under the direction of Arturo Uslar Pietri (1969–1978) and Ramón J. Velásquez (1982–2002).

Freilich also has published freelance articles in El Universal (1979–1981), Tal Cual (2006–2009), and Fundación Bigott publications (2005–2007). In addition, her interest in the media projected into the television atmosphere, when she hosted a cultural affairs program at Televisora Nacional from 1970 through 1971. Shortly after, she wrote a script based on the novel La Rebelión, published in 1946 by author Rómulo Gallegos, which was aired by Radio Caracas Televisión in 1972.

As an active educator for more than four decades, Freilich has been capable of providing instruction at various levels in her discipline from elementary school to university, both in private and public education.

Focusing on the diversity of her creative imagination, Freilich wrote Triálogo (1973), in which she compares historical themes and subjects, such as Shakespeare's Shylock and the horrible consequences of a myth; traces the parallels between the life of Isaac Babel and other Russian exiles, such as Boris Pasternak and Aleksandr Solzhenitsyn; associated Shalom aleichem with Jewish humor, and studies of Italian writers Giorgio Bassani and Natalia Ginzburg.

Through her essay Cuarta Dimensión (1975), she points out how the critic must understand and make them understand the book she has read, as you can read writers. And that is – simple and beautiful – the task that the author does. Her best known work is Cláper (1987), a novel which shows a deeper sense of belonging and family identity during a spiritual and physical journey of a Jewish immigrant to America in the early twentieth century, which starts in Poland and includes stops in Paris, Cuba and the United States before landing in Venezuela. Through the years, this novel has had six editions, five in Spanish and one in English.

In addition, her book La Venedemocracia (1978) is a compendium of interviews with some relevant political figures of Venezuelan contemporary history and their analysis, including former presidents Rómulo Betancourt and Rafael Caldera as well as Gonzalo Barrios, Luis Beltrán Prieto, Pompeyo Márquez and Jóvito Villalba, among others. Thirty years later it has now been reissued for the third time (2008). She has also written two biographies on well known musicians as Ilan Chester (2004) and Aldemaro Romero (2008).

== Private life ==
Freilich had two sisters, Miriam (born 1943) and Perla (1945–1972). She was married to Jaime Segal, a neurologist, in 1962, and was known as Alicia Freilich de Segal until their divorce in 1998. They had two sons, Ernesto and Ariel.

Currently, Freilich is an independent education and learning consultant who works across education settings in Venezuela. Besides this, she offer her opinion on art, film, literature, music, and politics in the blog Ideas de Babel.

Her son Ariel Segal is a writer and scholar associated with the Buber Center of the Hebrew University of Jerusalem and the Ben Gurion Institute of Israel; has also taught at the university level in Lima, Peru. British Broadcasting Corporation (BBC), correspondent in Israel.

== Selected works ==
Books

- Cuarta Dimensión
- En clave sexymental: Aldemaro Romero a medio siglo creativo
- Entrevistados en carne y hueso
- Ilan Chester es verdad
- La Venedemocracia
- Legítima defensa
- Triálogo, Notas de crítica urgente

Novels

- Cláper
- Colombina Descubierta
- Vieja Verde (Traducida al Inglés)

== See also ==
- List of novelists by nationality
- List of Venezuelan writers
- Venezuelan literature
- List of Latin American Jews
