= Brazil–Poland relations =

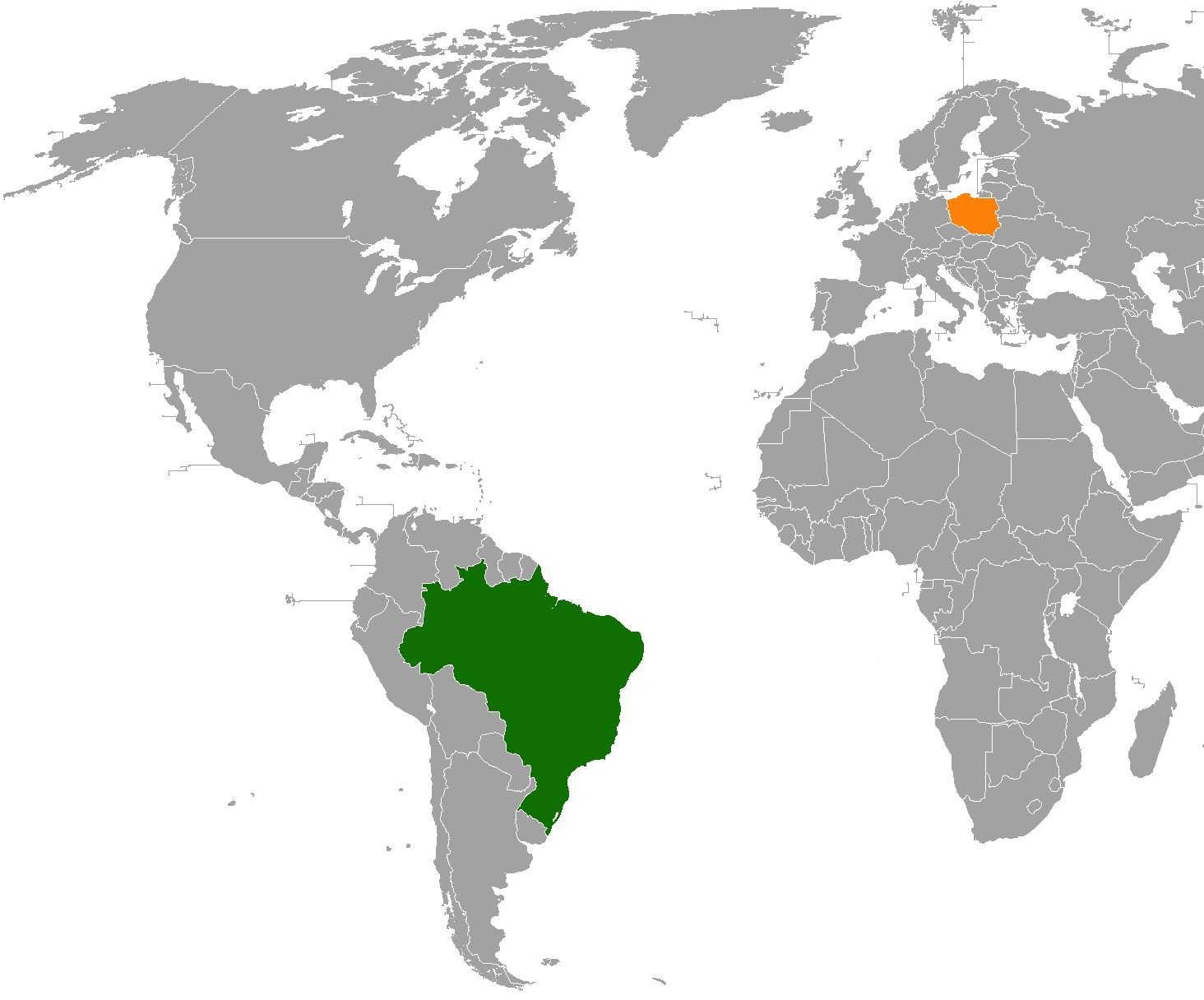
- Brazil: Poland

Diplomatic relations between Brazil and Poland were first established in 1920. Over 800,000 Brazilians are of Polish descent making Brazil the second country with the largest Polish community abroad (after the United States). Both nations are members of the United Nations.

== History ==
In the mid 1800s, Brazilian Emperor Pedro II encouraged Polish migration to Brazil and supported the independence of Poland, which at the time was partitioned between the Austro-Hungarian Empire, Russian Empire and German Empire. Brazilian diplomat, Rui Barbosa, advocated for Polish independence at the Hague Conventions of 1907. Between 1869 and 1920, over 60,000 Polish migrants immigrated to Brazil. Most of the Polish migrants settled in the state of Paraná.

During World War I, Brazil declared war on the Central powers. At the end of war, Brazil partook in the Treaty of Versailles which saw the restoration of an independent Poland. Poland achieved its independence in 1918 and Brazil became the first nation in Latin America to recognize Poland on 17 August 1918. On 27 May 1920, both nations established diplomatic relations and diplomatic legations were opened in each nations capitals, respectively. At the start of World War II in September 1939; Brazil remained neutral after the invasion of Poland by Germany. On 22 August 1942, Brazil declared war on Germany and Italy after the sinking of six Brazilian ships in the Atlantic Ocean by German U-boats. Both Brazilian and Polish troops fought alongside each other during the Italian Campaign. On 12 September 1945, Brazil recognized the Polish Provisional Government of National Unity. Soon afterwards, both nations re-opened diplomatic missions.

In January 1961, Polish Foreign Minister Adam Rapacki became the first high-level government official to visit Brazil. Soon after his visit, both nations upgraded their diplomatic mission to embassies. In 1962, Brazilian Foreign Minister Francisco Clementino de Santiago Dantas reciprocated the visit to Poland. In May 1961, both Brazil and Poland signed an agreement on trade and an agreement on cultural and scientific cooperation in August 1963. From 1965 to 1985, Brazil was governed by a military dictatorship which placed the advancement of diplomatic relations between both nations on hold, in addition, Poland was experiencing the Solidarity Polish trade union movement protests during the 1980s which contributed to the collapse of communism in the country in 1990. In 1995, Polish President Lech Wałęsa paid an official visit to Brazil, becoming the first Polish head-of-state to visit the nation. In 2002, Brazilian President Fernando Henrique Cardoso reciprocated the visit to Poland, becoming the first Brazilian head-of-state to visit the nation.

In January 2019, Polish Foreign Minister Jacek Czaputowicz paid a visit to Brazil to attend the inauguration of President Jair Bolsonaro. In May 2020, both nations celebrated 100 years of diplomatic relations.

== High-level visits ==
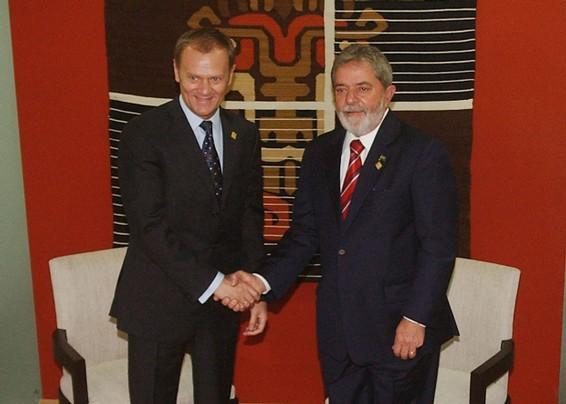
The meeting of prime minister Donald Tusk and president of Brazil Luiz Inácio Lula da Silva, 2008

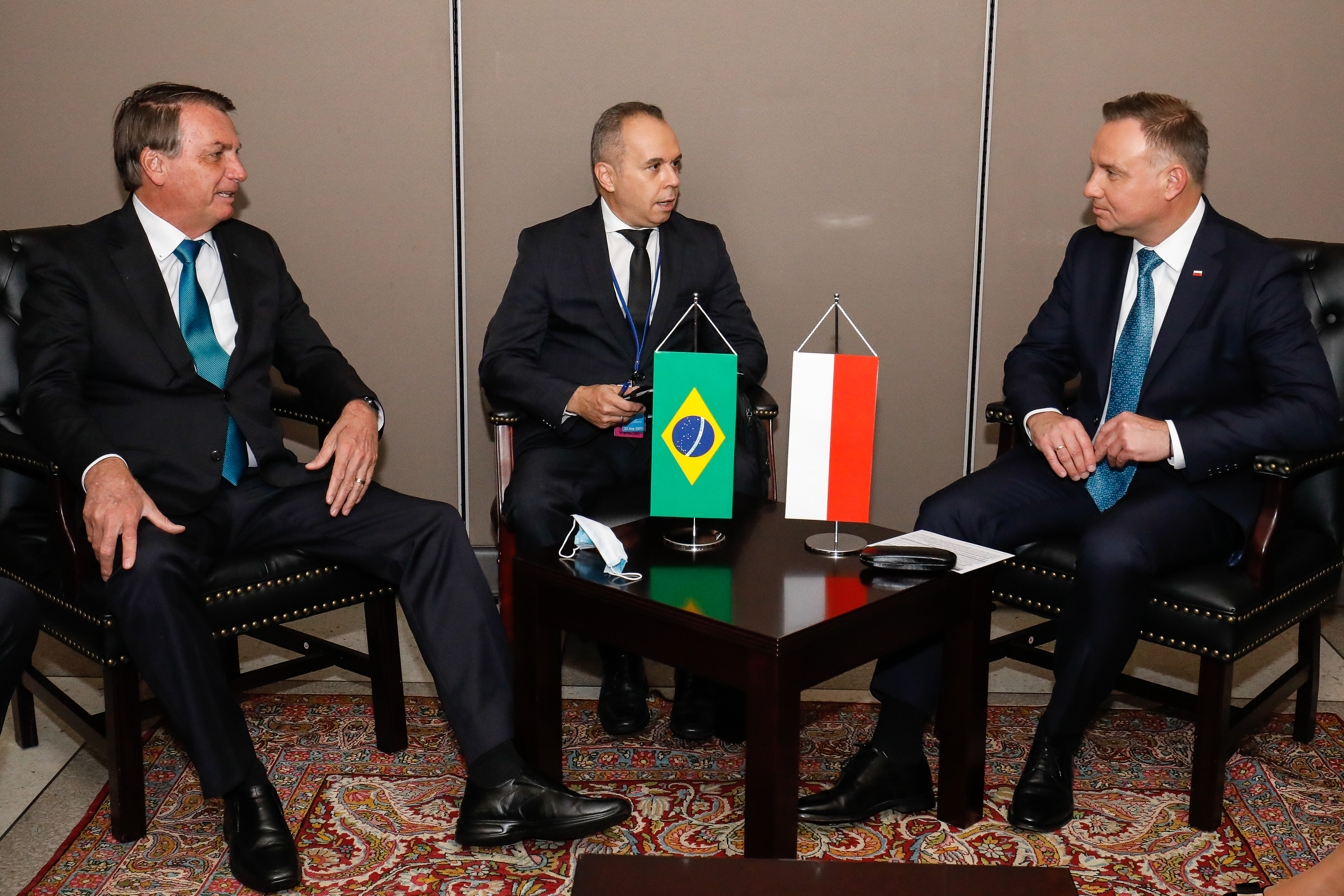
Meeting of President of Brazil Jair Bolsonaro and President of Poland Andrzej Duda in New York City in 2021

High-level visits from Brazil to Poland

- President Fernando Henrique Cardoso (2002)
- Foreign Minister Celso Amorim (2010)
- Foreign Minister Luiz Alberto Figueiredo (2012)
- Vice-President Michel Temer (2013, 2015)
- Foreign Minister Ernesto Araújo (February and May 2019)

High-level visits from Poland to Brazil

- President Lech Wałęsa (1995)
- Prime Minister Jerzy Buzek (2000)
- President Aleksander Kwaśniewski (2002)
- Foreign Minister Włodzimierz Cimoszewicz (2003)
- Foreign Minister Radosław Sikorski (2012)
- Foreign Minister Jacek Czaputowicz (2019)
- Chief of Cabinet Krzysztof Szczerski (2019)

== Trade ==
In 2018, total trade between Brazil and Poland totaled US$1.8 billion. Brazil's main exports to Poland consist of mineral resources, machinery and electric devices, foodstuffs, chemicals and plastics. Poland's exports to Brazil consist of machinery and electric devices, chemicals, as well as plastics, mainly synthetic rubber. Brazil is Poland's main trading partner in Latin-America. Brazilian airplane company Embraer has sold airplanes to Poland which are being used by Polish flag-carrier LOT Polish Airlines and by the Ministry of National Defence. In 2000, member nations of Mercosur (which includes Brazil) and the European Union (which includes Poland) began negotiations on a free trade agreement.

== Resident diplomatic missions ==
Of Brazil

- Warsaw (Embassy)

Of Poland

- Brasília (Embassy)
- Curitiba (Consulate-General)

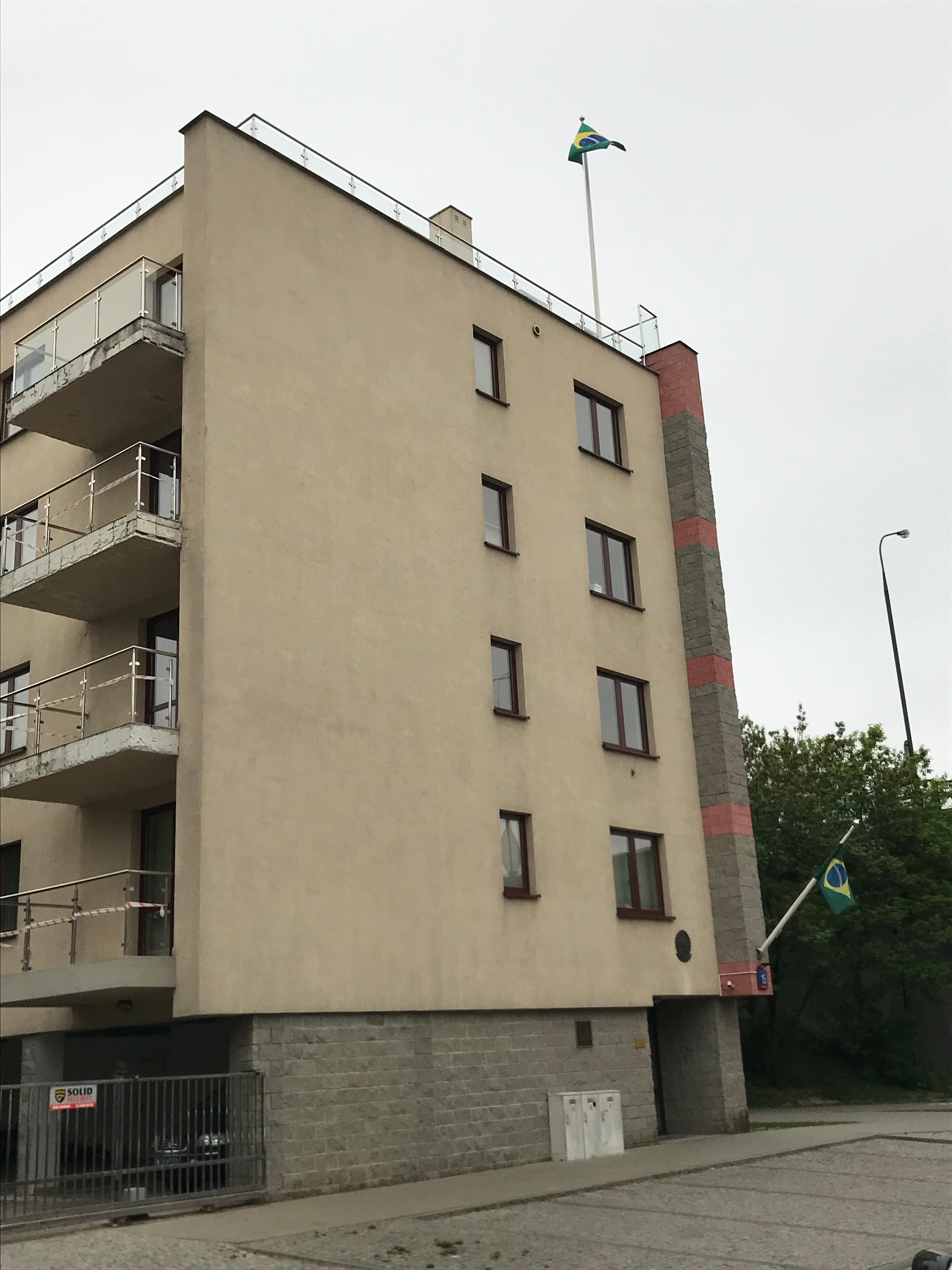
Embassy of Brazil in Warsaw

== See also ==
- Foreign relations of Brazil
- Foreign relations of Poland
- Morska Wola
- Polish Brazilians
- Brazil–EU relations
