= MS Morska Wola =

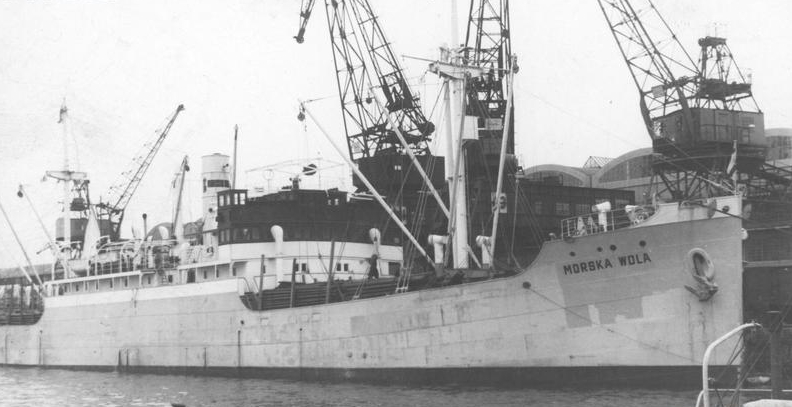

History

Germany
- Name: Consul Horn
- Namesake: HC Horn
- Owner: HC Horn shipping
- Port of registry: (Weimar Republic) Hamburg
- Launched: 1924
- Out of service: 1934
- Identification: Code Letters RFJV

United Kingdom
- Name: Hindhead
- Operator: Knoll Shipping Company
- Port of registry: (United Kingdom) London
- Acquired: 1934
- Out of service: 1935
- Identification: Code Letters GWWT

Norway
- Name: Rio Negro
- Owner: A/S Sobral
- Port of registry: (Norway) Oslo
- Acquired: 1936
- Out of service: 1938
- Identification: Code Letters LJHN

Poland
- Name: Morska Wola
- Namesake: Morska Wola
- Operator: Gdynia America Line
- Port of registry: (Poland) Gdynia
- Acquired: January 1939
- Out of service: 14 January 1959
- Reclassified: 1952, fish-boats supply base ship
- Identification: Code Letters SPEJ
- Fate: Scrapped, 1959

General characteristics
- Type: Bulk carrier, since 1952 supply ship
- Tonnage: 3,376 GRT; 1,973 NRT
- Length: 96.4 m (316 ft 3 in)
- Beam: 14.5 m (47 ft 7 in)
- Draft: 6.5 m (21 ft 4 in)
- Installed power: diesel, 1,400 hp (1,000 kW)
- Speed: 8.5 knots (15.7 km/h; 9.8 mph)
- Capacity: 12
- Crew: 28 (as a supply ship: 150)

MS Morska Wola, (previously Consul Horn, Hindhead and Rio Negro), was a Polish freighter during the Second World War. She was purchased in Norway by the Polish shipping company Gdynia America Line and named after a Polish emigrants settlement in Brazil.

== Origins ==
The ship was built as Consul Horn in Kiel in 1924 by Friedrich Krupp AG for the HC Horn shipping company, which operated her out of Hamburg. On 31 December 1927 the ship ran aground at Ven, Sweden. She was refloated on 4 January 1928.

In 1934 she was acquired by the Knoll Shipping Company, registered in London and renamed as Hindhead. She was then acquired by A/S Sobral in 1936 and renamed Rio Negro, operating on shipping routes between Norway and South America. In 1938 she was acquired by the Polish shipping company Gdynia America Line, renamed as the Morska Wola and based in Gdynia.

== World War II ==
In 1940, during the final days of the Battle of France, Morska Wola was in port in France, from which she escaped to the United Kingdom. She was then put to use in Northern Atlantic convoys. She took part in over 40 convoys, most notably, she was one of the ships who managed to escape, after the German heavy cruiser Admiral Scheer attacked convoy HX 84, thanks to the delaying action fought by the armed merchant cruiser HMS Jervis Bay. She returned to Poland at end of the war, operating on shipping routes to South America and the Levant.

== Post war ==
In 1952 she was taken over by the Dalmor fishing company and converted to supply ship for fishing boats operating in the North Sea. As such she had capacity of 150 people. After six years of such work, she was crippled by damage and judged unworthy of repair. She was scrapped in 1959.
