= El Centro de Estudios Judíos Torat Emet =

Spanish-language Jewish education and spirituality center

El Centro de Estudios Judíos “Torat Emet” is a Spanish-language Jewish education and spirituality center for Jews from all over Latin America. Its mission is to provide traditional Sephardic Torah study (also Torá, in Sephardic tradition) using the traditional perspectives of the Spanish and Portuguese communities' customs and rites in Spanish for Latin American audiences. Much of the center’s work focuses on the return of the Bnei Anusim, descendants of the Spanish and Portuguese Jews that were forcibly converted to Christianity during the Spanish and Portuguese Inquisitions. The center provides education via weekly classes and special events, which are held either via the web from its virtual bet midrash and/or in person at its various locations throughout the United States and Latin America.

== History ==
El Centro was founded in January 2000 in the Bronx, NY by Rabbi Rigoberto Emmanuel “Manny" Viñas who continues to be its Executive Director and primary leader. It is based out of Yonkers, NY, and has outreach centers in Miami, Puerto Rico, the Dominican Republic, Honduras, Spain, and Mexico. Students participate in events from 15 different countries. Rabbi Viñas' Facebook has over 23,000 followers. The center also has a YouTube channel, amassing 17.3K subscribers. The channel has hundreds of hours of classes in Spanish that feature Jewish theology, halacha, application of the minhagim of the Spanish-speaking Sephardim, history, and Zionism among many other topics. He’s also written a total of 12 articles for The Times of Israel before, including a featured article in 2014.

The center began its operations at the Hebrew Institute of Riverdale in the Bronx and received a grant from UJA Federation's COJIR. It then later moved its base of operations to the Yonkers-based Lincoln Park Jewish Center until 2017. The weekly classes and events are no longer held at that location. Rabbi Viñas is also no longer affiliated with the Lincoln Park Jewish Center. El Centro continues having monthly events and holiday celebrations in Yonkers, NY, as an independent 501(c)3 religious organization. Its weekly classes are held in various centers throughout the world and broadcast through Facebook on Rabbi Viñas' page.

The center has opened a synagogue and bet midrash based in Miami, Florida, led by Rabbi Benjamin Viñas, Rabbi Manny's brother. Rabbi Manny Viñas has continued this period of growth for the organization by launching centers in Latin American countries in an effort to strengthen the communities of anusim, who seek to return to Judaism and have a local community to call their own. This has garnered grassroots support throughout the Americas. During one such visit in June 2018 to the Dominican Republic at a lecture that attracted hundreds of followers, Rabbi Viñas was proclaimed by the leadership of the Sephardic community as "the Father of the Anusim" for his love and dedication to the return of the anusim to the ways of the ancestors and his relentless pursuit of education that will restore the anusim to Sephardic practice.

== Torá Tropical ==
Torá Tropical is a Jewish bi-monthly newspaper sponsored by El Centro de Estudios “Torat Emet.” The first issue of Torá Tropical was published in 2004 under the direction of Rabbi Viñas. His classes can be seen on his Facebook page and on his YouTube channel “Rabino Rigoberto Manny Viñas.” Countless topics are discussed, from history to Zionism and Sephardic laws and customs, with over a million views in total. His students span the globe since his work attracts a large Anusim community.

== Related Books ==
- Viñas, Rabino Rigoberto (2020). Seder for Tu' Bi'Shvat: Un Seder para Tu' Bi'Shvat (in Spanish).
- Viñas, Rabino Rigoberto (2021). Hagadah de Pesaj (in Spanish) (Spanish ed.).
