= Geula Zylberman =

Venezuelan artist (born 1931)

Geula Kohen Moradov (Hebrew: גאולה זילברמן; born May 16, 1931), commonly known as Geula Zylberman or Geula, is a naturalized Venezuelan abstract impressionist artist that emigrated to Venezuela in 1940. She rose to national fame in 1969 as a part of the figurative movement that took root in Latin America, painting picturesque Venezuelan landscapes and renowned portraits of Simon Bolivar. The positive domestic critical acclaim catapulted her to international recognition between 1971 and 1989, earning international recognition for her paintings and murals with exhibitions in countries such as Israel, the United States, Canada, Belgium, Brazil, France, Romania, and Honduras. Most recently, true to her ancestral roots, Geula has shifted into painting Judaica themes with a strong Zionist flare and national Israeli sentiment. As a result, Geula's artwork has constantly been representative of either Venezuelan or Israeli identity. Her art has been exhibited in Venezuelan federal and government buildings, the Israeli Knesset, major museums, and private collections worldwide.

== Biography ==
Geula was born in Tel Aviv, Mandatory Palestine.

=== Education ===
Geula began her studies of the arts in 1947, under the tutelage of Professors Carlos Otero, Gols Soler, Marcos Castillo, Rafael Monasterio, J.J. Espinosa and R.M. Durban in Caracas, Venezuela. After completing her first endeavor studying with these professors in 1952, she dedicated most of her time to her personal family life. Then, between 1956 and 1959, she continued her studies by attending the Escuela Nacional de Bellas Artes in Caracas, Venezuela and eventually traveling abroad to study - as an observer - the evolution of the plastic arts in Paris, Geneva and Barcelona and the Betzalel School in Israel. Upon her return to Venezuela in 1959, she attended the Escuela de Artes Plásticas “Cristobal Rojas” under the tutelage of Professor Rafael Martin Durban, she also studied “Escultura y Vaciado” under the tutelage of Professor Sergio Rodriguez and “Escultura y Modelado” under the tutelage of Professor Juan Jaen in Caracas, Venezuela until 1962.

In 1965, she decided to shift her area of study focus, pursuing academic endeavors that would give her an opportunity to transition into becoming an art teacher herself. It was at this point that she enrolled in intensive courses on “Pedagogia Terapeutica” in AVEPANE, Caracas, Venezuela, a course on “Pedagogia Didactica” co-sponsored by the University of Jerusalem in Caracas, Venezuela in 1968, and finally a course on “Artes Plasticas Pre-Escolar” at the Education Ministry in Caracas, Venezuela.

==== Family ====
Geula married Gerszon Zylberman, a Polish citizen that enlisted in the British Army during World War II on September 24, 1950 in Rehovot, Israel. After a couple of years in Israel, they returned to Caracas where they established themselves, forming a family with three children: Yaeli Zylberman, Ygal Zylberman and Ilana Zylberman. Of her children, Geula was famously quoted when asked by the journalist Gotmar Nalber "Which is your best painting?" and she responded "My three children..."

==== Professor ====
One of the highlights of Geula's professional career, was her experience leading the Taller Geula, which was also referred to as L'atelier de Art Geula. In 1971, she inaugurated Taller Geula, teaching drawing, painting, sculptures, complementary cultural classes and more. Amongst her renowned students, are the Colombian-Swedish artist Libardo Garzon Murillo, the Venezuelan artist Magally Erminy also known as Magerim, whom she taught in 1972, and the Israeli artist Nira Spitz who has exhibited her paintings in New York City, Venezuela, Brazil, London and Hong Kong and whose work enhances private collections throughout the world.

She also taught at the Casa Municipal de la Juventud del Concejo Municipal del D.F. in Caracas, Venezuela in 1975

== Exhibitions ==
=== Exhibitions in Venezuela ===
Geula's artwork has been exhibited in a series of museums, government buildings and private collections. In 1971, she was part of a select group of local and international artists, presenting her work in the Museo de Bellas Artes de Caracas along with Jesus Soto, Francisco Narvaez, Rodin and Pablo Picasso. Between October 7 and October 17 of the same year, Geula presented 56 paintings in the Galeria de Arte Sans Souci, in Caracas, Venezuela Of this exhibition, some of the leading Venezuelan journalists, like Orlando Materan Alfonso, described her as "Geula Color and Emotion", admiring her "landscapes with deep feelings and colors of tropical earth" and Nella Carmona Paginas said Geula was "a great spokesperson of our land, they are the paintings of such renowned artist that have managed to captivate with her spatula the one thousand and one pathways of this land of grace". The Daily Journal wrote that "Venezuelan folklore and landscape [make] up the theme of the majority of Geula's paintings, which are executed in a very particular style".

=== International exhibitions ===
Geula also represented Venezuela in the 1st "Sol del Caribe" Fair held at the InterContinental Hotel in Curaçao from November 19 to December 5, 1971.

By the year 1972, some of Geula's paintings were being presented at the Headquarters of the United Nations representing Venezuela and at the Winston Gallery in New York City.

Between 1960 and 1979, her art was exhibited abroad in Culture House, Yaffa, Israel, United Nations Plaza, New York City, US, Intercultural Exchange Exposition in Bucharest, Romania, Conahotu Building, New York City, US, and the Primera Feria Internacional Sol del Caribe, Hotel Intercontinental, Curaçao.

In Venezuela, she had multiple exhibitions in the Biblioteca Nacional, Caracas, Venezuela, Israeli Union Convention House, Caracas, Venezuela, Palacio de las Industrias – Sabana Grande, Caracas, Venezuela, Sandu Gallery, Hilton Hotel, Caracas, Venezuela, Galeria Chagall, Caracas, Venezuela, Winston Gallery, New York City, US, Salon de Pintura Juan Lovera, Caracas, Venezuela, Museo de Pintura Emilio Boggio, Caracas, Venezuela, El Museo Criollo Raul Santana, Caracas, Venezuela, El Salon Teresa Carreño, Caracas, Venezuela, Palacio Municipal, Caracas, Venezuela, Centro de Ingenieros del Estado, Mérida, Venezuela, La Escuela de Formacion de Oficiales de las Fuerzas Armadas de Cooperacion (EFOFAC), Caracas, Venezuela, Puerto Azul Club, Caracas, Venezuela, Junco Country Club, Caracas, Venezuela, Israeli Union Cultural Center “Shalom Aleijem” Caracas, Venezuela, Education Ministry, Caracas, Venezuela, “Mamo” Naval School, Maiquetia, Venezuela, Colegio Medico, Maracaibo, Venezuela, Colegio de Arquitectos, Mérida, Venezuela, Guardia Nacional Club, El Paraiso, Venezuela

== Artwork ==
Before her most recent form of impressionist abstract art, Geula was known for her traditional landscape artworks and canvasses illustrating the Venezuelan citizenry and their professions: from the peasant market seller, to the Jewish immigrant tailor that represented the migratory tidal wave of Ashkenazi and Sefardic Jews that arrived to Venezuela in the first half of the 20th century. Images of her art were repeatedly illustrated in leading Venezuelan magazines like Galaxia 71 a magazine dedicated to the arts in Latin America, the magazine ellas which drew a strong female audience, and the magazine La Semana with a weekly distribution of 40,000 prints, making it one of Venezuela's magazines with the largest circulation. Her artwork, numerous interviews, and reviews were published in the leading newspapers of Venezuela between 1969 and 1972 such as La Religion, El Mundo Israelita, El Nacional, La Verdad, El Mundo, El Universal and The Daily Journal, Venezuela's English-Language Newspaper.

Geula’s most recent masterpieces are a series of 4’ by 6’ abstract murals completed between 1995 and 1998.

=== Famous artpieces ===
- El frutero Oleum, 19711
- Pelea de Gallos Oleum, 1971
- Grandeza, Oleum, 1975
- La Cantera. Edo. Bolivar, Oleum 65 x 90 cm, 1976
