= Maritime and Colonial League =

Polish colonial organisation (1930–1939)

- Liga Morska i Kolonialna
- Poster designed by Antoni Wajwód for LMiR, 1939
- Abbreviation: LMiR
- Predecessor: Maritime and River League
- Successor: Maritime League
- Formation: 1930; 96 years ago
- Dissolved: September 1939; 87 years ago
- Purpose: Promotion of Polish maritime issues
- Location: Second Polish Republic
- Members: 1 million (1939)
- Director: Mariusz Zaruski
- Main organ: Morze

The Maritime and Colonial League (Polish: Liga Morska i Kolonialna) was a mass Polish social organization, created in 1930 out of the Maritime and River League (Liga Morska i Rzeczna). In the late 1930s it was directed by general Mariusz Zaruski and its purpose was to educate the Polish nation about maritime issues. It also actively supported the development of both a merchant fleet and large navy, as well as the creation of Polish colonies and overseas possessions.

Among countries regarded as suitable for Polish overseas settlements were Brazil (Paraná), Peru, Liberia, Portuguese Mozambique, and French possessions in Africa, such as Madagascar. The organization enjoyed widespread popularity and in 1939 had around one million members.

== Origins ==
The roots of the League can be traced back to the fall of 1918, the first days of the Second Polish Republic. On 1 October 1918, a group of 25 young men founded an organization called Polska Bandera (Polish Flag), whose purpose was to popularize the sea among the Poles and to encourage the youth to participate in naval navigation.

The organization, supported by influential politicians, quickly grew. In May 1919, it was changed into the League of Polish Navigation (Liga Żeglugi Polskiej). Five years later the name was changed again, into the Maritime and River League (Liga Morska i Rzeczna), then, in late 1925, it published its first monthly magazine, The Sea (Morze) (in 1939 magazine was renamed The Sea and Colonies).

The first demands for Polish colonies were issued at the first convention of the League (Katowice, October 1928) Two years later, at the third and last convention in Gdynia, the organization got its most famous name, the Maritime and Colonial League.

== Activities ==
Originally, the League was a public body, with limited membership. Soon afterwards, it was taken over by the government and became a tool of its propaganda. In 1933, Prince Janusz Radziwiłł, member of the Polish Parliament, declared that if Germany was to get back its former colonies – a demand advanced at the time by such German bodies as the Reichskolonialbund – Poland should receive a share proportionate to its succession to the former German Empire.

Furthermore, some Polish politicians argued that the debt, which the world apparently owed to Poland for saving Europe from an invasion by the Soviet Union, should be paid off with colonies.

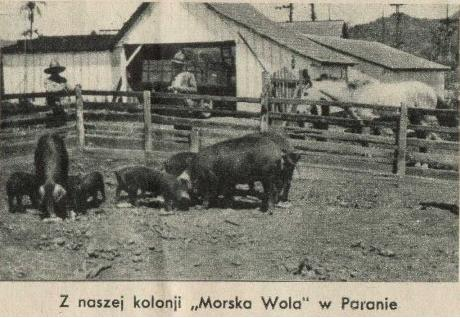
Morska Wola, Polish settlement in Brazil

Throughout the 1930s, the League organized mass demonstrations, collected funds and published materials. Among people who participated in demonstrations were clergymen and members of the governing party, Camp of National Unity (Oboz Zjednoczenia Narodowego), accepted colonial aspirations.

In the summer of 1937, the Polish Ministry of Foreign Affairs prepared a document called Colonial Theses of Poland, and in September of the same year, Poland officially demanded colonies, during the session of the League of Nations.

Polish demands, however, were ignored by the Western powers, as neither France, nor Great Britain wanted to relinquish their possessions. Nevertheless, the Polish government continued to advance its demands even well into 1939, up until the eve of German invasion of Poland. However, Poland never considered the possibility of armed capture of overseas lands, counting on a customs union with smaller and less significant colonial powers, such as Belgium and Portugal.

Some historians have argued that the Polish government promoted colonialism to solve the problem of chronic overpopulation and unemployment of some areas of the country. Also, the Poles expressed a desire for raw materials such as minerals and timber, especially those found in Liberia.

Apart from colonies, activities of members of the League were concentrated on the development and expansion of the Polish Navy. In the early 1930s the League started a special fund, which within 2 years collected 5,000,000 zlotys. The money was handed to the Government of the Polish Republic for the purpose of possibly fast construction of a submarine for the Polish Navy. Thus, the legendary ORP Orzeł was funded.

== Attempted Polish overseas possessions ==
=== Angola ===
In collaboration with Portuguese colonial authorities, the league operated plantations in Angola during the 1920s, beginning in 1928. These efforts in Angola lead to Polish colonization attempts in other countries of Africa.

=== Brazil ===
In 1930, 135 Polish families left for the state of Espírito Santo in Brazil. In June 1934 the League sent its messenger, retired general Stefan Strzemieński, who wanted to buy 2 million hectares of land in Brazilian state of Paraná (part of its population, around 100,000, had already been Polish, due to mass emigration of Poles from Galicia in the 19th century). An agreement was signed with the state government, which agreed to hand the land to the Poles, in exchange of construction of a 140-kilometer rail line from Riozinho to Guarapuava.

However, the Poles bought only 7,000 hectares and created there a settlement called Morska Wola. Also, they purchased additional 2,000 hectares and planned to found another settlement, Orlicz-Dreszer (as a gesture to director of the League, general Gustaw Orlicz-Dreszer, who died in Gdynia in a plane crash in 1936). In August 1935, the first Polish settlers left for Brazil, around 350 people.

However, in spite of initial success, Polish activities in Parana were noticed by Brazilian public opinion. In Curitiba, local daily Correio do Parana was alarmed that Poland was planning to conquer a few Brazilian states (Paraná, Santa Catarina, and Rio Grande do Sul), and establish its own colony, dependent on Warsaw. As a result, anti-Polish demonstrations took place in Curitiba. Polish newspapers described events in faraway Brazil, in April 1934, Ilustrowany Kurier Codzienny mocked the conflict, writing on the main page "We expect arrival of Polish Army headquarters in Parana".

Soon afterwards, the Brazilian government under Getúlio Vargas began limiting Polish immigration, and also the Poles themselves were no longer interested in settling in Brazil. In 1938, the project was cancelled.

=== Liberia ===
Poland became interested in Liberia in the early 1930s. The Black Republic was at the time in danger of becoming a mandate of the League of Nations because of accusations of its ruling Americo-Liberian elite enslaving the indigenous population. Allegations of modern slavery in Liberia led the League of Nations to establish the Christy commission. Findings included government involvement in widespread "Forced or compulsory labour". Minority ethnic groups especially were exploited in a system that enriched well-connected elites. Poland had been entrusted with the responsibility of filing reports concerning the situation in Liberia on the forum of the League of Nations. It might have therefore been in Liberia's interest to maintain good relations with Poland. In the fall of 1933, Liberia sent Dr. Leo Sajous as an unofficial representative to the Polish capital to ask the Maritime and Colonial League to become an agent in promoting direct economic and cultural links between Liberia and Poland, which it did not ironically suspect of colonial ambitions. The Polish government participated in the talks in the person of the Minister of Trade and Industry, Ferdynand Zarzycki. It was the League, however, that was ultimately authorized to negotiate with Liberia. Sajous's visit resulted in a Polish delegation headed by the writer and traveler Janusz Makarczyk, which toured West Africa, including Togo and Sierra Leone, in the spring of 1934. On 28 April, on behalf of the President of the Maritime and Colonial League, General Gustaw Orlicz-Dreszer, Makarczyk signed the preliminary agreement on a bilateral "Treaty of Friendship" with the Liberian Republic. Clarence Lorenzo Simpson signed the document on behalf of Edwin Barclay, the Liberian president. The treaty had a semi-colonial character and favored the Polish side. For example, Liberia was to incur the cost of sending to and educating several men in Poland, which could eventually serve as a Polish-oriented colonial elite back home. Especially interesting, and perhaps unprecedented, was that a social organization (the League) was establishing ties with a government of an independent country. Poland obtained the status of the "most privileged state" and facilitated access to farmland and raw materials in Liberia. According to one of Makarczyk's later accounts, the treaty was also supposed to include a secret clause that allowed the League to recruit up to 100,000 Liberians to the Polish Army in case of war. Unfortunately, no record of this secret clause has been found. Polish specialists traveled to Monrovia and established a consulate in the Liberian capital. The League was planning to promote a large-scale Polish settlement in the Black Republic. In December 1934, a group of Polish pioneers boarded the vessel S.S. Poznań, which took them from Gdynia to Monrovia. The Poznań also carried Polish products for sale in Liberia, among them enameled chamber pots. Polish farms were established in Liberia but did not bring large profits due to small investments flowing in from Poland. With time, Liberia became frightened by reckless articles in the Polish press that labeled the Black Republic as practically a Polish colony. In addition, the American press launched an anti-Polish campaign, perhaps inspired by the large corporation Firestone with interests in Liberia. By 1938, the League was forced to withdraw from Liberia.

=== Madagascar ===
A special interest was shown in Madagascar, with a kind of historical claim provided by the 18th-century Polish adventurer Maurice Benyovszky who had spent some years on that island and on one occasion been chosen a ruler by some of its inhabitants. Polish interest in Madagascar was fueled by the 1937 visit of Polish popular writer Arkady Fiedler to the Madagascar town of Ambinanitelo, where he lived for several months and on whose people's culture he later wrote a book which had considerable success among the Polish public. However, as France had no inclination to give up its rule of Madagascar in favor of Poland, this had no practical consequences.

== Outcome ==
The League ceased to exist in September 1939, following the joint German and Soviet invasion of Poland. After World War II, the newly established Polish People's Republic was not interested in colonialism and the organization was reestablished in 1944 as the Maritime League. It was dissolved in 1953. It was recreated again as the Maritime League in 1981. Since 1999, it has been called the Maritime and River League.

In the spring of 2006, Polish artist Janek Simon went to Madagascar, looking back to the ideas of the interbellum period. He wanted to organize there the "Polish Year in Madagascar"; instead, two exhibitions took place.
