= Morska Wola =

- Country: Brazil
- Established: Around 1934

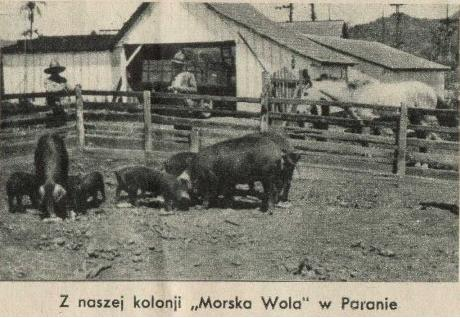
Morska Wola

Morska Wola was a Polish settlement, located in Brazil, in the state of Paraná. It was founded by the Maritime and Colonial League around 1934. The League purchased land from local Indigenous Brazilian tribes and carried out an extensive promotional campaign in Poland, trying to attract settlers. Morska Wola was divided into 286 plots, each the size of 25 hectares, and 62 municipal plots, the size of these was 100 x 60 meters. In the first half of the 1930s, the cost of settlement of one family was as high as 3,000 zlotys, out of which more than 2,000 zlotys was transportation. The first settlers left Poland in August 1935, and at the end of 1936. Some 75 families, around 350 people, lived in Morska Wola. In 1937 Morska Wola was inhabited by around 50% of its predicted population.

The idea was abandoned in 1938, when it became clear that those Poles interested in settling in South America, preferred Argentina or Paraguay. Furthermore, the Brazilian government, worried that Poland planned to carve out part of the country, adopted an unfriendly attitude, which was a big handicap for Polish plans.

The Polish ship, MS Morska Wola was named after the settlement. She worked shipped lines from Gdynia to South America before serving in Atlantic convoys during the Second World War; she was scrapped in 1959.

== See also ==
- Brazil–Poland relations
