= Lincoln Park Jewish Center =

Modern Orthodox synagogue in Yonkers, New York

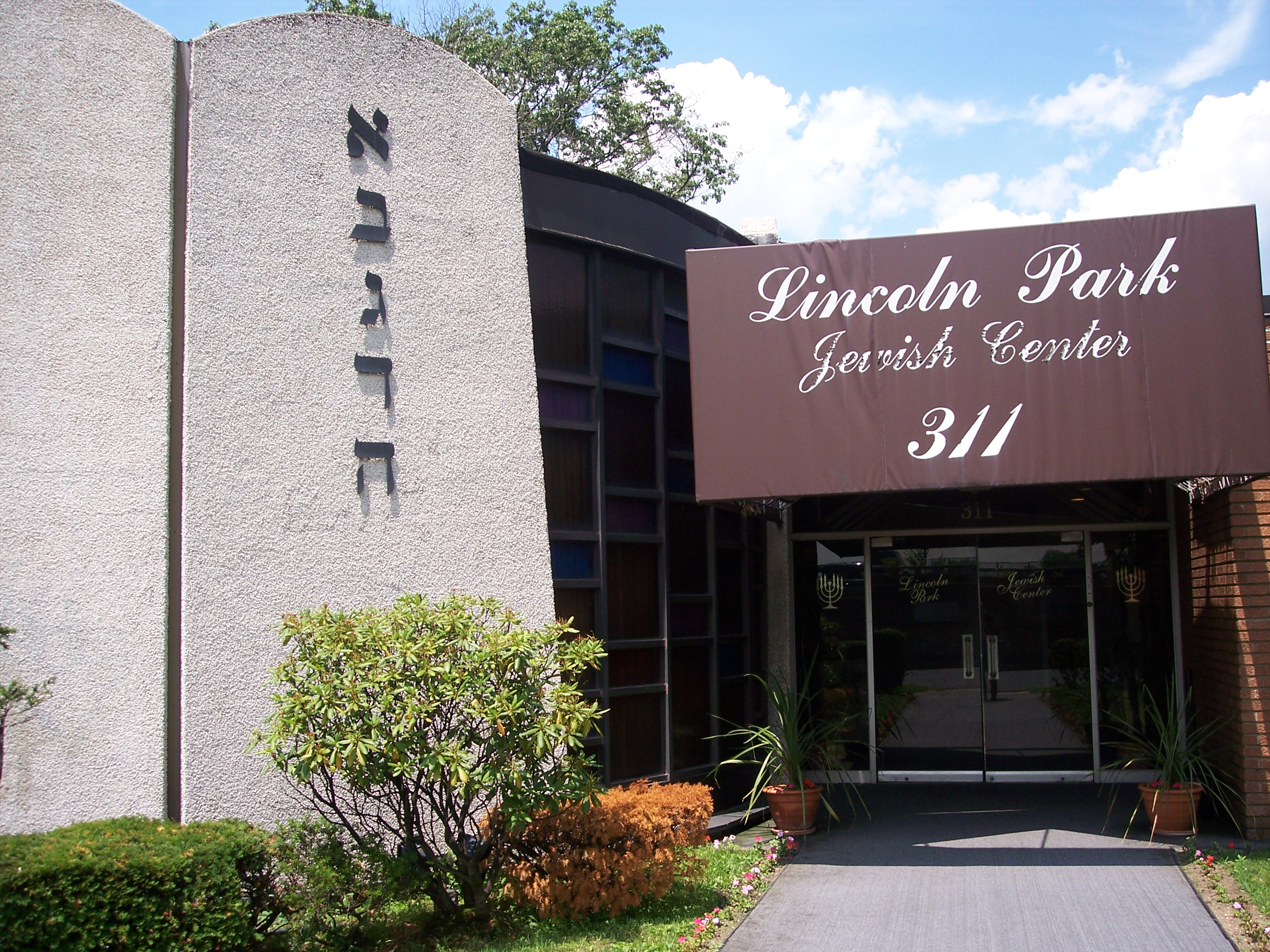
- Lincoln Park Jewish Center

- Location just outside the New York City boundary

Religion
- Affiliation: Modern Orthodox Judaism
- Ecclesiastical or organisational status: Synagogue
- Leadership: Rabbi Sebbag
- Status: Active

Location
- Location: 311 Central Park Avenue, Lincoln Park, Yonkers, Westchester County, New York
- Country: United States
- Coordinates: 40°55′00″N 73°52′22″W

Architecture
- Established: 1938

Website
- lpjc.org

The Lincoln Park Jewish Center is a Modern Orthodox synagogue located in 311 Central Park Avenue in the Lincoln Park section of Yonkers, in Westchester County, New York, United States.

The originally Ashkenazi congregation was founded in 1938. Elliott Palais, a former president of the Lincoln Park Jewish Center said that the synagogue building "was designed by Eli Rabineau, the same architect who designed the Grinton I. Will Library in Yonkers and Bet Torah in Mount Kisco."

The Lincoln Park Jewish Center revitalized in the early 21st century by Rabbi Rigoberto Emanuel Viñas, a Cuban-American Jew. According to the New York Times, Viñas attracted a large number of Hispanic Jews to the congregation, including Holocaust survivors who had settled in Buenos Aires, Argentina, and Jews with roots in Cuba, Puerto Rico, and Spain. He was particularly noted for performing "ceremonies of return" for anusim.

In early 2017 the synagogue building was sold to Brooklyn congregation Vayetar Yitzchok, after the Lincoln Park Jewish Center's membership declined from 350 to 65 families. Vayetar Yitzchok had about 200 member families and shared a synagogue in Brooklyn with another congregation, according to Lazar Lieberman, Vayetar Yitzchok's rabbi.
