= Moyses Chahon =

Moyses Chahon (1918–1981) was a Jewish Brazilian Army general and a distinguished veteran of World War II. Born in Rio de Janeiro, he completed his secondary education at the Colégio Pedro II before joining the Brazilian Army Infantry as a cadet-officer in the late 1930s. As a young officer, Lieutenant Chahon served in the Brazilian Expeditionary Force in Italy and was mentioned in dispatches. He was the recipient of many Brazilian honours including the Medalha de Sangue do Brasil, Cruz de Combate de 1a. Classe, Medalha de Campanha, and the Medalha de Guerra. Chahon was one of only four Brazilians to receive the US Silver Star for bravery in combat during World War II. General Chahon retired from the Army in 1969.
