= Noel Nutels =

Brazilian physician (1913–1973)

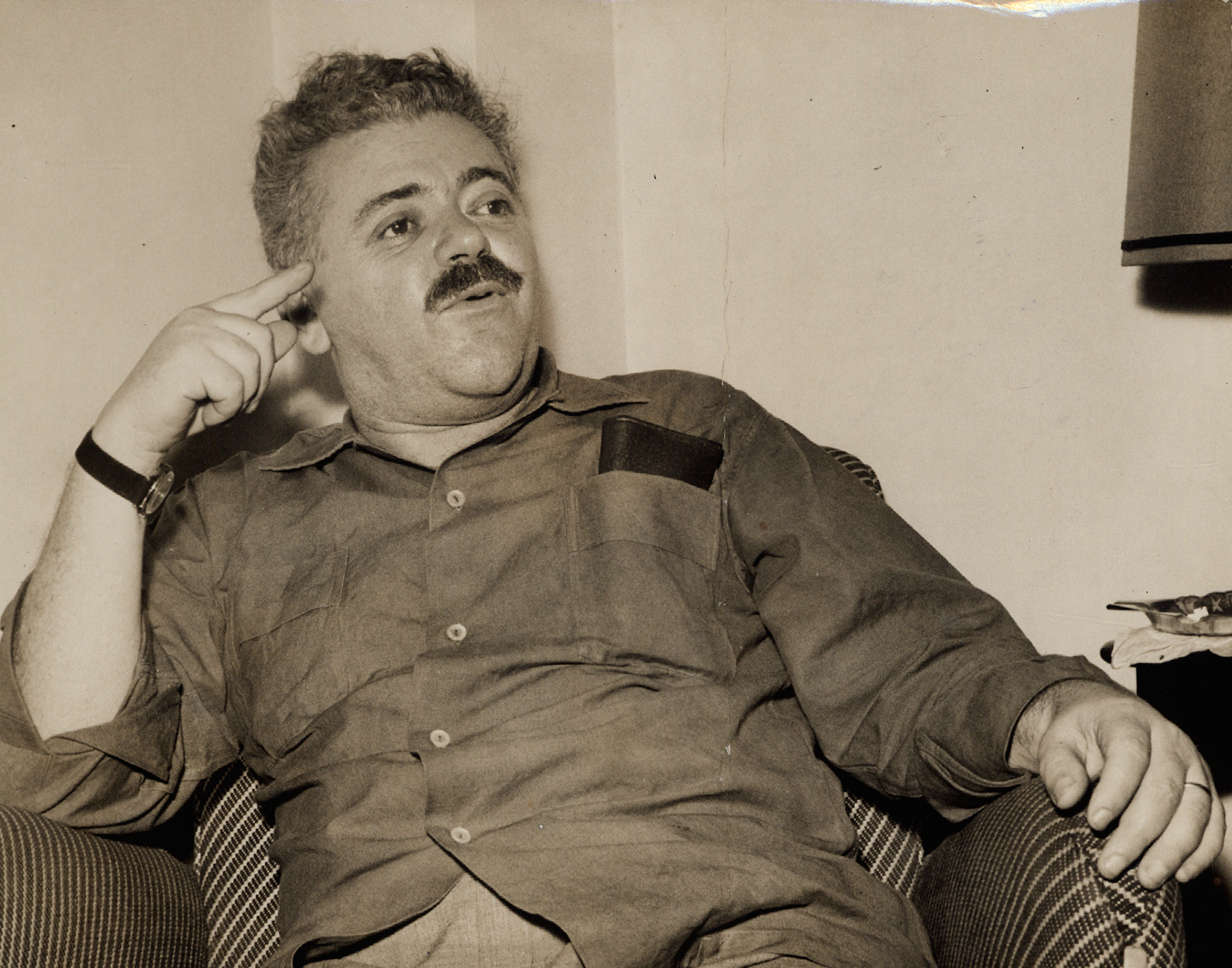
- Nutels in 1958
- Born: 1913; Ananiv, Ukraine (then part of the Russian Empire)
- Died: 1973 (aged 59–60)
- Occupation: Physician, public health specialist
- Medical career
- Profession: Public Health
- Field: Brazilian Amerindian health and rights
- Institutions: Indian Service
- Sub-specialties: Public Health

Noel Nutels (1913-1973) was a Brazilian physician who dedicated his life to the well-being of Brazilian Amerindians.

== Biography ==
He was born in Ananiv, Ukraine (then part of the Russian Empire), in 1913 and immigrated to Pernambuco in Brazil as a youngster. He qualified in medicine in Recife in 1938 and specialized in public health.

In the 1940s he joined the Indian Service and from then on he dedicated his life to the aboriginal cause, becoming a champion of Indian rights.

He has been honored in many ways and is considered one of the fathers of the Brazilian Public Health.

== Bibliography ==
- Bastos, Comandante Paulo de Mello (2003). Salvo Conduto (PDF) (in Brazilian Portuguese) (2 ed.). Família Bastos. p. 212. ISBN 85-89853-02-0. OL 30752756M.
