= Marcelo Samuel Berman =

Argentine-Brazilian physicist

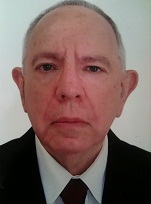
- Marcelo Samuel Berman in 2012
- Born: 10 April 1945 (age 81); Buenos Aires, Argentina
- Died: May 4 2019; Curitiba, Paraná, Brazil
- Citizenship: Brazil; Argentina
- Education: Instituto Tecnologico de Aeronautica
- Children: 2
- Scientific career
- Fields: Relativistic Cosmology, General Relativity and Investigative Journalism
- Workplaces: Instituto Albert Einstein/Latinamerica

Marcelo Samuel Berman (born Buenos Aires, Argentina; 10 April 1945 – 4 May 2019) was an Argentine and Brazilian theoretical physicist specialized in relativistic cosmology, as well as a professor and journalist. He published books dealing with science, philosophy of science and learning techniques.

After finishing his engineering degree in electronics, Berman took graduate courses in theoretical physics at ITA, and received a Master of Science in physics in 1981 from the Technological Institute of Aeronautics, under the direction of Fernando de Mello Gomide, followed by a Doctor of Science in physics from the Federal University of Rio de Janeiro in 1988, under the direction of Murari Mohan Som,

He subsequently had post-doctoral studies at Department of Astronomy, University of Florida (1989–90) and part-time adjunct, or visiting positions at Department of Exact Sciences, FURJ (UNIVILLE), in Joinville, SC, Brazil, the University of Alabama, Tuscaloosa, and Group of Cosmology and Gravitation, Division of Astrophysics, National Institute for Space Research (INPE), São José dos Campos, SP, Brazil.

His field of interest is the General Gravitational Theories and Relativistic Cosmology; he has written about one hundred papers in refereed journals and ten books.

From 1996 to 2000, he was Professor, Department of Physics, ITA (Technological Institute of Aeronautics), São José dos Campos. He then served as Scientific Counselor, Tecpar (Technological Institute of Paraná). Curitiba, PR -Brazil from (2000-2002) and since 2006, the Scientific Director, Instituto Albert Einstein/Latinamerica, (Curitiba and Mafra). He died on May 4 2019.
