= Samuel Kicis =

Brazilian Army general

Samuel Kicis (1913–1984), was a Brazilian Army general and a veteran of World War II. He was born in Rio de Janeiro, in 1913, the child of Jewish immigrants from Romania. He joined the Brazilian Army as a cadet-officer in 1932. He served as an Artillery captain, in the Brazilian Expeditionary Force in Italy, commanding a battery of 155mm guns, and was mentioned in dispatches. He was the recipient of many Brazilian honours including the "Cruz de Combate de 2a. Classe", the "Medalha de Campanha", the "Medalha de Guerra" and the "Medalha do Pacificador". General Kicis retired from the Army after a distinguished career in 1968.
