= Maurício Waldman =

Brazilian academic and activist (born 1955)

Mauricio Waldman

Maurício Waldman (born 2 December 1955) is a Brazilian academic and environmental activist.

== Biography ==
Waldman was born in São Paulo on 2 December 1955, to a Jewish family originally from Poland and Italy. As an activist, he collaborated with Chico Mendes and several organizations, including Comitê de Apoio aos Povos da Floresta (Forest People Committee), the African Studies Centre of São Paulo University (USP), and Centro Ecumênico de Documentação e Informação – CEDI (Ecumenical Centre of Documentation and Information, in São Paulo and Rio de Janeiro). He also participated in activist movements against dams, anti-nuclear demonstrations, and especially against water pollution in São Paulo.

From the 1980s to 1992, Waldman was an active member of the Brazilian Workers' Party (PT), working on political papers and as a party organizer. He founded the PT Jewish Committee (1988) and Ecological Commission (1989). He also became involved in the Executive branch of government as Chico Mendes Park's Coordinator in the east of São Paulo (1990) and Environmentalist Administrator in São Bernardo do Campo (1991–1992), a city in the ABC Region, the industrial region next to São Paulo where PT began.

However, anti-ecological measures taken by the city administration and members of the party created a serious conflict between Waldman and the mayor, and in 1992 he left the PT and returned to the university and to his professional life.

Waldman received his Anthropology M.Sc. degree from USP in 1997. He became Director of the Children Homeless’ School of São Paulo in 1998, Director of the Fundação Estadual do Bem Estar do Menor' School in 1999, coordinator of São Paulo Recycling Service in 2000, and Editor of the Brazilian Geographers' Association (AGB) São Paulo Sector from 2002 to 2003.

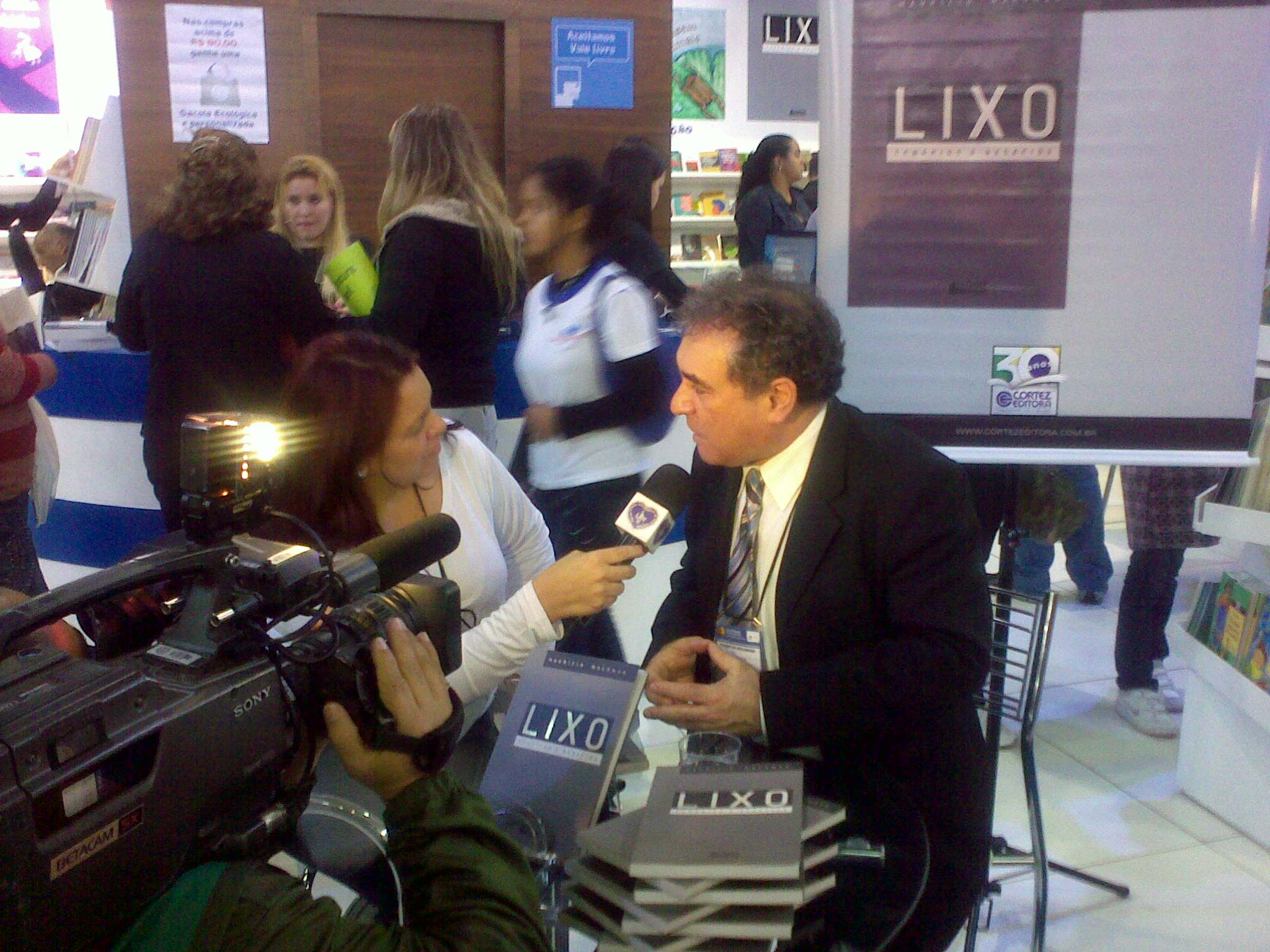
Waldman launching his last book Lixo: Cenários e Desafios. São Paulo International Book Fair, 2010

Waldman received his Ph.D. degree from the Geography Department of USP in 2006. His thesis, "Water and Metropolis: Limits and Expectations of the Time", is one of the most detailed academic works on Brazilian water resources and Water management in the Metropolitan Region of São Paulo. Subsequently, with the support of the National Council for Scientific and Technological Development (CNPq), Waldman conducted post-doctoral research from 2010 to 2011 at the Geography Department of the Geoscyenses Institute at the University of Campinas. This research, focused on municipal solid waste in Brazil, led to several papers and lectures, and finally a book, Lixo: Cenários e Desafios ("Waste: Scenarios and Challenges"), launched in August 2010 at São Paulo International Book Fair. In September 2011, this book was selected as a finalist of the Prêmio Jabuti literary awards.

Also in 2011, Waldman began his second Postdoctoral Research project, at USP's Faculty of Philosophy, Languages-Literature and Human Sciences (FFLCH-USP). The focus of this research was the Angolan basin management policy, evaluating the role of Angola in Southern-Central Africa's hydro resources, in terms of International Relations.

This Postdoctoral Research was linked to the FFLCH-USP Sociology Department and supported by São Paulo State's Foundation for Research Support. This work took place under the supervision of Professor Fernando Augusto Albuquerque Mourão, a Brazilian Africanist and expert in International Relations and Multilateralism. In December 2013 Waldman finished this research, and began a third Postdoctoral Research project, again supported by CNPq. The focus of this project was the incineration of municipal solid waste, recycling management policies, and the Waste picker movement, and it concluded in December 2015.

In 2016 Mauricio Waldman founded the Kotev publishing house in São Paulo, intending to launch e-books and e-texts on the Kobo platform. He has contributed articles to magazines Cultura Verde, and Ambiente Urbano, among others, and is a columnist for the O Imparcial, Think & Rethink Column. He has also written a large number of papers, scientific and technical reports, e-books and e-papers, articles, and essays, and given lectures at a variety of conferences and universities. He has translated work by authors such as Michael Shellenberger, Joan Martinez Allier and Diané Collinson.

Waldman is currently a Senior Researcher at the Africa Research Institute, part of the Doctoral School for Safety and Security Sciences at Óbuda University in Hungary.

== Books ==
- Água: Escassez e Coflitos no Império da Sede. Coleção Água em Foco, Nº. 1. São Paulo (SP): Editora Kotev. 2019.
- Recursos Hídricos, Resíduos Sólidos e Matriz Energética: Notas Conceituais, Metodológicas e de Gestão Ambiental. Chapter 5, pp. 1.282-1315. Chapter 53, pp. 1.59-70. In Política Nacional de Resíduos Sólidos e suas Interfaces com o Espaço Geográfico: Entre Conquistas e Desafios. Porto Alegre (RS): Universidade Federal do Rio Grande do Sul (UFRGS). 2016.
- Waters of Metropolitan Area of São Paulo: Technical, Conceptual And Environmental aspects. Chapter 53, pp. 1.282-1315. In Sustainable Water Management in the Tropics and Subtropics – and Case Studies in Brazil. Brazil-Germany: Fundação da Universidade Federal do Pampa (Brazil) and Kassel Universität (Germany), 2012.
- Para Onde Vamos?. In. Meio Ambiente e Missão - A Responsabilidade Ecológica das Igrejas. São Bernardo do Campo: EDITEO – Editora da Faculdade de Teologia da Igreja Metodista, 2003.
- Natureza e Sociedade como espaço de cidadania. In. PINSKY, Jaime; PINSKY, Carla Bassanezi. (Orgs.) História da Cidadania. São Paulo: Contexto, 2003.
- A Eco-92 e a Necessidade de um novo Projeto. In Geografia, Meio Ambiente e Desenvolvimento em Questão. Fortaleza: Associação dos Geógrafos Brasileiros. 1992.
- Ecologia e Lutas Sociais no Brasil, (Ecology and Social struggles in Brazil). São Paulo: Contexto, 1992. (Coleção Caminhos da Geografia).
- Oito Críticas Ecológicas à Conversão da Dívida. In. SCHILLING, Paulo (Org.) Conversão da Dívida e Meio Ambiente. São Paulo: Global/ CEDI, 1991.
- Ecologia e Movimentos Sociais: breve fundamentação. In. VIANNA, Aurélio (Org.). Hidrelétricas, Ecologia e Progresso. Rio de Janeiro: CEDI, 1990.
- Política das Minorias: o caso dos judeus no Brasil. V. 7. Porto Alegre: Mercado Aberto, 1988. (Série Tempo de Pensar).
- Doze Estudos em Geografia Crítica. Rio de Janeiro: Fundação Pró-Memória MEC, D.A. nº 1.071/83, Título nº 28.659, October 4, 1983, São Paulo-Rio de Janeiro.
- (with D.M. Schneider) Guia Ecológico Doméstico. São Paulo: Contexto, 2000.
- Brava Gente de Timor. São Paulo: Xamã, 1997.

=== Teaching books ===
- Maurício Waldman et alli. Coleção Tecendo o Saber. 1ª ed. Rio de Janeiro: Fundação Roberto Marinho e Fundação Vale do Rio Doce, v. 9. 1395 pages. 2005.
- Geografia para o Ensino Fundamental. São Paulo: Editora Didática Suplegraf, 1999.
