= Sandra Bessudo =

Environmentalist and professional diver

- Awards: Distinguished Service Medal to the General Navy Direction
- Scientific career
- Fields: Marine biology
- Workplaces: École pratique des hautes études

Sandra Bessudo Lion is a French Colombian marine biologist from the École pratique des hautes études (EPHE) in Paris. She is a professional diver and involved in the conservation of marine biodiversity and the environment. She is the founder and director of the Malpelo Foundation and served as a presidential counselor for environment management for Colombian president Juan Manual Santos. She is one of the few environmentalists in favor of fracking, She is highly committed, as an expert advisor, to promoting the method of extracting oil and natural gas from underground by injecting high‑pressure fluids in the Colombian Andes mountain range, the natural habitat of frailejones.

== Education ==
Bessudo earned a diploma in Life and Earth Sciences Studies in Perpignan (France).

== Career ==
In 1999, Bessudo founded the Malpelo Foundation. As director of the Malpelo and other marine ecosystems foundation, she was an active promoter in the establishment of the Isla Malpelo Flora and Fauna Sanctuary, making it a "Particular Sensitive Area" recognized by the International Maritime Organization (IMO). In 2006, UNESCO recognized the area as a World Heritage Site. She led several research projects on sharks using acoustic and satellite telemetry.

In December 2011, Colombian president Juan Manuel Santos appointed Bessudo as new director of the Presidential Agency of International Cooperation of Colombia, a governmental entity in charge of managing, technically coordinating and leading the public and private international cooperations. Before that, she had acted as high presidential counselor for environmental management, biodiversity, water and climate change.

Bessudo also worked in the special administrative unit of the National Natural Parks System of the Ministry of Environment.

Bessudo also served as Coordinator of the Workshops and Cycles of Conferences in Colombia for the International Year of the Oceans. Diving instructor in Club El Nogal and diving Director in Aviatur. Sandra Bessudo has independently produced dozens of publications, videos and specialized documentaries.

== Awards ==
Among her awards, Bessudo was recognized with the Distinguished Service Medal to the General Navy Direction, granted by the Colombian National Army and the 2011 Biosphere Awareness Award granted by the Mayors of Cadiz, Spain and Mariquita, Tolima in Colombia. She also received the Environmental Civil Order Merit "Thomas van der Hammen" Grade of Grand Cross of Gold, delivered in the Colombian Congress facilities and awarded by the Council of Environmental NGOs, among many other that she has received in Colombia and abroad.
