= Saúl Balagura =

Colombian artist and poet

- Born: 1943 (age 82–83); Cali, Colombia
- Education: University of Valle
- Alma mater: Princeton University
- Known for: Artist and poet
- Notable work: The Holocaust Series, The Girl Series, The Musicians Series of paintings; Life's Palimpsest a novel.
- Style: Expressionist
- Website: Saúl Balagura's Website

Saúl Balagura (born 1943) is a Jewish Colombian artist and poet.

== Life ==
Saúl Balagura was born in Cali, Colombia in 1943. Both his parents were Romanian Jews who fled the country during the pogroms against the Jews in Romania. At an early age, he developed a passion for art and poetry. At age seventeen, he had his first solo exhibition. Throughout his life, the self-taught artist studied a plethora of subjects in the arts and sciences. He earned a M.D. from University of Valle, a Ph.D. in Psychology from Princeton University, and a Neurosurgery degree from Albert Einstein Medical Center. In 1994, he retired from the world of science and opened a studio in Tesuque, New Mexico. Later in 2006, he opened a studio in Houston, Texas. His scientific and neurosurgical articles have been published in numerous clinical and scientific journals. His expressionistic work is a result of interacting with artistic influences including Willem de Kooning, Eduardo Guayasamin, el Greco, Pablo Neruda and Gabriel García Márquez. Balagura also wrote poems that go along with his paintings. His work has been exhibited in galleries and museums throughout the United States.

In 2008, Holocaust Museum Houston presented his series about the Holocaust called In Search of Hope in downtown Houston, Texas. In 202, his novel, "Life's Palimpsest" was published.

== Sources ==
- Balagura, Saúl (2021). Life's Palimpsest : life cannot be rewritten without scarring the soul. Texas: S. Belagura. ISBN 978-0-578-87192-9. OCLC 1298906787.
