= John Sudarsky =

Colombian politician (born 1986)

Senator of Colombia
- In office July 20, 2010 – July 20, 2014

Personal details
- Born: John Sudarsky Rosebaum; February 19, 1947 (age 79) Armenia, Quindio, Colombia
- Party: Green Party
- Education: University of Los Andes (IE); University of Kansas (PB)
- Website: House website Personal website

John Sudarsky (born February 19, 1947) is a Colombian politician who served in the Senate of Colombia. He was a member of the Alianza Verde from 2010 to 2014.

== Early life and education ==
Sudarsky was born in Armenia, Colombia into a family of Jewish immigrants who had fled Europe during World War II. His family later moved to Bogotá. Sudarsky holds a master's degree in Psychology from the University of Kansas and Doctor of Education degree from Harvard University.

== Senate of Colombia ==
=== 2010 Colombian parliamentary election ===
Sudarsky, representing the Green Party of Colombia, served as a senator of the Republic during 2010–2014. He was a principal sponsor and proponent of the Statutory Law of Participation (Law 1757 of 2015), which established new mechanisms for citizen engagement. As a member of the First Commission, he sponsored legislation on violence against women, which was later approved in the Senate plenary. Sudarsky also supported the enactment of Law 1696 of 2013, which introduced penalties for drunk driving. He additionally introduced legislation aiming to reform the electoral system to incorporate a mixed electoral model. During his tenure in the Senate, Sudarsky advocated for greater public accountability by legislators, arguing that members of Congress should present annual reports directly to citizens rather than only to their electoral constituencies. Together, with Bogota representative Angela Maria Robledo, he led a faction within the Green Party that opposed forming a political coalition with former president Alvaro Uribe.

=== 2014 presidential election ===
As part of the Colombian presidential election 2014, Sudarsky ran in the Alianza Verde presidential primary. In the Green Party primary, he secured approximately 350,000 votes—representing 8% of the total—placing third behind Enrique Peñalosa who led with 48%, and Camilo Romero (17%).
