= Antisemitism in Venezuela =

Antisemitism in Venezuela has occurred throughout the history of the Jews in Venezuela. However, under the presidencies of both Hugo Chávez and Nicolás Maduro, allegations of antisemitism grew following actions and statements by the Venezuelan government, while also occurring in public incidents. The Bolivarian government would also use the words of "Jewish" and "Zionist" interchangeably in order to avoid accusations of antisemitism.

The Jewish population also declined rapidly under the Bolivarian government according to the Algemeiner Journal, with an estimated population of 22,000 in 1999, falling to under 7,000 in 2015. Though specific leaders have used antisemitic language, Venezuela's broader history of antisemitism is not large or unusual.

== 19th century ==
At the turn of the 19th century, Venezuela were fighting against their Spanish colonizers in wars of independence. Simon Bolivar, the liberator, found refuge and material support for his army in the homes of Jews from Dutch colony of Curaçao. In Willemstad Jews such as Mordejai Ricardo and brothers Ricardo and Abraham Meza offered hospitality to Bolivar as he fought against the Spanish, thus establishing brotherly relations between Jews and the newly independent Venezuelan republic. Several Jews even fought in the ranks of Bolivar army during the war. The ties between Jews in the Dutch island colonies and Venezuela increased more dramatically between 1819 and 1821 after its new constitution called for religious freedom. In 1820, the first Jewish family settled in the town of Coro, which has a Jewish cemetery with tombstones dating back to 1832.

In 1827, a group of Jews moved from Curaçao and settled in Coro, Venezuela. Other Jewish communities began springing up in Caracas and Puerto Cabello in the 1840s. In 1844, groups of Jews from Morocco came to the town of Barcelona and, in 1875, they were granted permission to establish a Jewish cemetery. In 1855, rioting in Coro forced the entire Jewish population, 168 individuals, to seek refuge in their native Curaçao. As they claimed Dutch citizenship, the consul-general for the Netherlands, Van Lansberge, informed the home government, and three war ships were sent to La Guaira, the principal seaport of Venezuela, and the redress demanded was at once granted. The Venezuelan government agreed to salute the Dutch flag; to restore to the Jews their property; and to pay an indemnity of 200,000 pesos ($160,000), the last clause being carried into effect in 1859, after lengthy diplomatic negotiations with the ambassador of the Netherlands, Jhr. O. van Rees.

Assimilation of Jews in Venezuela was difficult, though small communities could be found in Puerto Cabello, Maracaibo, Villa de Cura, San Cristobal, Barcelona, Carupano, Rio Chico, and Barquisimeto.

== 20th century ==
In response to rising political tension between the Netherlands and Venezuela, in March 1902, compelled the Jews of Coro again to seek an asylum in Curaçao, tendered to them by the governor of the island, Jhr. J. O. de Jong van Beek en Doorn, who, upon learning the facts, dispatched the Dutch warship HNLMS Koningin Regentes to protect them. It returned to Curaçao with eighty Jewish women and children on board. In July following, the same vessel and the HNLMS Utrecht were sent to La Vela de Coro for the remainder, and only a few Jewish residents remained behind to protect the property of the exiles.

Immigration restrictions were placed on Jews in the early 20th century and were abolished in the late 1950s. By 1950 there were around 6,000 Jewish people in Venezuela and the biggest waves of immigration occurred after World War II and the 1967 Six-Day War, The Jewish population in Venezuela was largely centered in Caracas, with smaller concentrations in Maracaibo. Most of Venezuela's Jews are either first or second generation.

Venezuela was hospitable to Jewish life, and Jews "developed deep ties to the country and a strong sense of patriotism".

== 21st century ==
=== Emigration ===
According to the Latin American Jewish Congress, Venezuela's Jewish community had an estimated 22,000 people when Chávez took office in 1999. In the first few years of the 21st century, the number of Venezuelan Jews emigrating to Israel grew steadily. The Algemeiner Journal stated that the Jewish emigration from Venezuela occurred due to "the country’s economic crisis ... as well as the anti-Semitic rhetoric that has marked the left-wing regime’s support for Iran, Syria, and Palestinian Islamist organizations like Hamas" and that "first Chavez and now Maduro have found political uses for anti-Jewish rhetoric".

In 2007, it was reported that emigration had resulted in a drop of almost 20% of Venezuela's 20,000 strong Jewish population amid concerns of rising allegations of antisemitism. The Latin American Jewish Congress estimated that in 2007, only between 12,000 and 13,000 Jews still resided in Venezuela. By November 2010, more than 50% of Jewish Venezuelans had left the country since Chavez came to power, with some of those remaining behind complaining of "official antisemitism". By early 2013, only 9,000 Jews lived in Venezuela and in early 2015, it was reported that under 7,000 lived in the country. By 2026, only around 4,000 Jews lived in the country and the community had been left decimated according to the American Jewish Committee.

The United States was the prime destination, particularly Miami, Florida. Others went to Israel, as well as to Panama, Colombia, Costa Rica, and Guatemala.

=== Media ===
In its 2002 report, the Stephen Roth Institute said a Venezuelan journalist in the U.S., Ted Cordova-Claure, "published an article in the privately owned, pro-democracy Tal Cual equating Sharon and Hitler". The Roth Institute also said that Frontera journalist Alfredo Hernandez Torres justified suicide bomb attacks against Israel, saying that "Sharon displays more hate than the Nazis had for the Jews." Torres called Sharon a "beast" and said that Israel engaged in "genocide in Jenin ... which would have embarrassed even insensitive Hitler". The Roth Institute reported that Venezuelan newspapers El Universal and El Nacional have accused Israel of genocide, with an editorial written by Maria de los Angeles Serrano in El Nacional stating Israeli Jews "are today strangulating, deporting, placing under closure and killing the Palestinian people with the same enthusiasm as that of their persecutors, the Nazis". According to the Roth Institute, when Últimas Noticias interviewed Lebanese-Venezuelan politician and Fifth Republic Movement leader Tarek William Saab and Franklin González, director of the School of International Studies at the Central University of Venezuela, both bemoaned that the United Nations had disappointed Palestinians, and that "the roots of the conflict lay in the creation of the State of Israel, in 1947".

The 2009 World Conference against Anti-Semitism claimed that anti-Jewish articles had been printed in the Chavez-sponsored media "an average of 45 pieces per month" during 2008 and "more than five per day" during the month-long January 2009 operation in Gaza (Operation Cast Lead).

On April 4 2011, during a news program, presenter Cristina González of the state run Radio Nacional de Venezuela endorsed "The Protocols of the Elders of Zion" which is an old forgery claiming Jews are conspiring to control the world. The Confederation of Jewish Associations of Venezuela filed a complaint to the Attorney Generals Office. They also condemned the incident and called on the government to examine and sanction those culpable for circulating it while adding that they didn't think there was a formal policy directed at Jews.

According to the Antisemitism in Venezuela 2013 report by the Venezuelan Confederation of Israelite Associations (CAIV), "distorted news, omissions and false accusations" of Israel originate from Iran's Press TV and Hispan TV, are repeated by the Russia's RT and Cuba's Prensa Latina, and Venezuela's state media, including SiBCI, AVN, TeleSUR, Venezolana de Televisión (VTV), Alba TV, La Radio del Sur, Radio Nacional de Venezuela (RNV), YVKE Mundial, Correo del Orinoco and Ciudad CCS. CAIV continues, stating that the media accuses Zionism of being a "predator movement", that "anti-Semitic authors pretend to establish differences between Jewish religion and the Zionist movement" and that the Venezuelan government's media uses anti-Semitic themes.

=== Accusations of Chávez antisemitism ===
The Simon Wiesenthal Center criticized President Hugo Chávez after he compared Spain's José María Aznar to Hitler. In late 2005, Rabbi Henri Sobel of Brazil, a World Jewish Congress leader, also accused Chávez of antisemitism.

In 2004, after he overcame the referendum on his presidency, Chávez told the opposition not to let themselves "be poisoned by those wandering Jews. Don't let them lead you to the place they want you to be led. There are some people saying that those 40 percent [who supported his recall] are all enemies of Chavez." The next day he said on national television that "There are some − every day there are fewer − 'small leaders' [dirigencillos] who don’t lead anyone, they are more isolated every day, and wander around like the wandering Jew." The Roth Institute says that the Jewish community in Venezuela explains that the phrase 'wandering Jews' "was directed metaphorically at the leaders of the opposition parties" and is a common term in the Catholic world. Vice President José Vicente Rangel explained the meaning of the term the next day, and assured Jewish community leaders that it had been used inappropriately. The U.S. State Department also mentioned that "A few days after his electoral victory, President Chavez gave a speech in which he compared the opposition to 'wandering Jews'." Writing in The Weekly Standard, Thor Halvorssen says the United States Department of State's Bureau of Democracy, Human Rights, and Labor's "Report on Global Anti-Semitism" noted that "Anti-Semitic leaflets also were available to the public in an Interior and Justice Ministry office waiting room."

The Wiesenthal Center criticized statements made by Chávez during a 2005 Christmas celebration at a rehabilitation center as antisemitic. Referring to the December 2005 speech, the Miami Herald said, "It's not the first time Chávez has made comments deemed anti-Semitic. In 2005, Chávez stated that "[t]he world is for all of us, then, but it so happens that a minority, the descendants of the same ones that crucified Christ, the descendants of the same ones that kicked Bolívar out of here and also crucified him in their own way over there in Santa Marta, in Colombia. A minority has taken possession all of the wealth of the world."

According to the JTA, Venezuelan government sources, and Fairness and Accuracy in Reporting, Jewish leaders in Venezuela said the quote omitted the reference to Bolívar, stated that Chávez was referring to Jews, and denounced the remarks as antisemitic by way of his allusions to wealth. According to an article published at Forward.com, Venezuelan Jewish community leaders accused the Simon Wiesenthal Center of rushing to judgment with the antisemitic remarks, saying that Chávez's comments had been taken out of context, and that he was actually referring to "gentile business elites" or the "white oligarchy that has dominated the region since the colonial era". However, according to the American–Israeli Cooperative Enterprise in their Jewish Virtual Library, the Venezuelan Jewish communities and organizations refrained from criticizing Chavez's statements so they would not draw negative publicity and for security reasons.

In a nationally televised speech, Chávez accused the Wiesenthal Center of working with Washington. "It's part of the imperialist campaign", Chávez said, according to the JTA. "It's part of this political battle." The Wiesenthal Center's representative in Latin America replied that Chávez's mention of Christ-killers was "ambiguous at best" and that the "decision to criticize Chávez had been taken after careful consideration".

Critics point to Chávez's professional relationship with Norberto Ceresole. Halvorssen says that, "Chavez first ran for president on a reform platform, winning in a landslide. What few understood then was that Chavez planned to revolutionize the country following a plan masterminded by his longtime friend Norberto Ceresole, an Argentinian writer infamous for his books denying the Holocaust and his conspiracy theories about Jewish plans to control the planet." Holocaust denier Ceresole calls the Jews of Venezuela the greatest threat to Chavismo in his Caudillo, Ejército, Pueblo (Leader, Army, People). Chávez denies receiving advice from Ceresole, who was evicted from Venezuela a few months after Chávez reached power; later, Clarin.com said that José Vicente Rangel described Ceresole's book as disgusting and despicable.

An article in The Boston Globe discussed a Jewish filmmaker who "fled the country, fearing for his life" in January 2006. According to the article, the hosts of a government television program accused him of being part of a "Zionist conspiracy against Chávez"; the next day, Chávez called for laws to block the production of films that "denigrate our revolution". (subscription required)

The JTA said in 2006 that Jews in Venezuela were increasingly fearful of Chávez's vehement criticism of Israel during Israel's 2006 Lebanon War with Hezbollah. They said his rhetoric was "fanning the flames of anti-Semitism", and that the recent antisemitic behavior was not typical for Venezuela. They indicated concern about "the government's incendiary comments about Israel and Jews". Chávez has been accused of antisemitism several times by organizations like the Anti-Defamation League, which wrote to Chávez asking him to consider how his statements might affect Venezuela. The southern area director of the ADL accused Chávez of "distorting history and torturing the truth, as he has done in this case, it is a dangerous exercise which echoes classic anti-Semitic themes". The president of the Miami-based Independent Venezuelan-American Citizens said in 2006 "That's what you expect from someone who surrounds himself with the dregs of the world. He seeks out terrorists and dictators. It's predictable that he wouldn't defend a democratic country like Israel." Jewish-Venezuelan community leaders in Caracas told El Nuevo Herald that Chávez's statements have created a situation of "fear and discomfort ... The president is not the president of a single group but of Venezuelan Jews as well." The Federation of Israeli Associations of Venezuela in 2006 condemned "attempts to trivialize the Holocaust, the premeditated and systematic extermination of millions of human beings solely because they were Jews ... by comparing it with the current war actions".

The Wikileaks Cablegate in 2010 revealed that members of the CAIV had raised concerns with US diplomats regarding what they felt was the increasingly hostile environment created for Venezuelan by the government of President Hugo Chávez, saying they see a "dark horizon" for their community. They feared the Chavez government's growing ties with Iran, and the language chosen by Chavez to protest against Israeli policies. "While Chavez's rhetoric once clearly differentiated criticism of Israel from that of the Venezuelan Jewish community, since 2004 they believe he has merged his anti-Zionist views with anti-Semitic ones", US Political Counselor Robin D. Meyer quoted the leaders as saying.

In 2013, president Nicolás Maduro responded to accusations by Claudio Epelman, director of the Latin American Jewish congress, that the solid presence and bolstering of relations with Iran among Latin American nations are furthering antisemitism on the continent. Maduro in response revealed that he himself along with Ernesto Villegas, minister of communication and information, had Jewish ancestry claiming he was sad about the fact that Epelman, who he knew and had met in Venezuela many times, was saying there's antisemitism in Venezuela and accusing him and Chávez of being part of it. Maduro added that "He can accuse me, but he should leave Chávez out of it" and said that being critical of Israel didn't mean you were being antisemitic. Maduro further explained that they respected the Jewish peoples deep socialist history, giving Karl Marx as an example while also saying that the Holocaust were committed by people of the far-right following the thoughts of Mussolini and Hitler rather than Lenin.

==== SEBIN spying ====
In January 2013, 50 documents were leaked by Analisis24 showing that SEBIN had been spying on "private information on prominent Venezuelan Jews, local Jewish organizations and Israeli diplomats in Latin America". Some info that was gathered by SEBIN operations included office photos, home addresses, passport numbers and travel itineraries. The leaked documents were believed to be authentic according to multiple sources which included the Anti-Defamation League, that stated, "It is chilling to read reports that the SEBIN received instructions to carry out clandestine surveillance operations against members of the Jewish community".

=== Public incidents ===
The Roth Institute reported in 2002 that anti-Israel, Chávez supporters demonstrated wearing T-shirts with the inscriptions "Jerusalem will be ours" and "Israel out, solidarity with the Palestinian cause."

In its 2004 annual report, the Roth Institute said the Sephardic Tiferet Israel Synagogue was repeatedly attacked after a government-sponsored rally on May 16 in which the slogans "Don’t allow Colombia to be the Israel of Latin America", "Sharon is a murderer of the Palestinian People", "Viva the armed Palestinian people", and "Free Palestine" were written on city walls.

The 2004 Roth Institute report noted a number of incidents, including the armed raid carried out by security forces in November on the Jewish elementary and high school in Caracas, which it described as "perhaps the most serious incident ever to have taken place in the history of the Jewish community". It also stated that "Pro-Chavez supporters were responsible for numerous antisemitic manifestations, including repeated desecrations of the Sephardic Tiferet Israel Synagogue." According to a report, the Jewish population in Venezuela had dropped below 15,000, which it claims is "a result of severe instability in the country". The Miami Herald and Jewish Times reported emigration of Jewish people from Venezuela due to alleged concerns over antisemitism.

In August 2004, the United States Department of State said some incidents of antisemitism occurred during the presidential recall referendum. The pro-government newspaper VEA accused Jewish leaders of participating in the Venezuelan coup attempt of 2002. The U.S. State Department and the Roth Institute reported graffiti with slogans like "Jews go home", were carved into synagogues after a 2004 government-sponsored rally, signed by the Communist Youth and the Communist Party of Venezuela. On August 8, 2004, Chávez supporters chanted "Sharon is a murder. No to Israel", with the letter S shaped like a swastika. They also wrote, "Viva Chavez and Arafat" and "NO to Zionism". Communist Party members posted signs saying "Neither Orlando Urdaneta nor the super-terrorist Israelis will succeed with our people", "No to the Israeli commandos in Caracas", "No to the involvement of Israelis in our nation", "No to the Mossad and no to the CIA", and "Bush+Sharon=murderers".

The U.S. Department of State said, in its 2005 report on International Religious Freedom, that Venezuela is a "historically open society without significant anti-Semitism; however, the Government and its supporters occasionally demonstrated possible anti-Semitism".

==== 2004 Jewish school raid ====
According to the U.S. State Department, in November 2004, after Venezuelan government prosecutor Danilo Anderson was assassinated, "the Government used satirical comments made by journalist Orlando Urdaneta on a U.S. television program to allude to possible Israeli participation in Anderson's killing". The Israeli Embassy denied any Israeli involvement, cautioning that the Government representations were misleading.

On November 29, 2004, at 6:30 a.m., as school children arrived at Colegio Hebraica, a Jewish grade school in Caracas, 25 members of the country's investigative police, DISIP, broke into the school, some of them armed and hooded, and locked the doors with the children inside, to search the school as part of the Anderson investigation. After a three-hour search, the children were freed; police later said the search was "unfruitful" and government officials confirmed nothing had been found.

The U.S. State Department said that newspaper accounts of rumors of Israeli involvement in Anderson's assassination might have been behind the investigation. Thor Halvorssen, writing in The Weekly Standard, said that the judge who ordered the raid claimed that "electronic equipment, arms, explosive devices, communications equipment and documents" connected to the bombing that killed politician Danilo Anderson were suspected of being inside the building, and that Mossad agents had been behind the bombing. According to the Stephen Roth Institute, the search of the school was based on one anonymous phone call. The Jewish Telegraphic Agency wrote that the transfer of weapons and explosives from Club Magnum, a shooting club, to the Jewish school had been reported, but Club Magnum was not searched. Interior Minister Jesse Chacón said nothing was found in the school and, along with Communications Minister Andrés Izarra, denied that the raid was meant to intimidate the Venezuelan Jewish community.

The raid was condemned by the Simon Wiesenthal Center, calling it an "antisemitic action, which seems more like a pogrom than a legal procedure under the rule of law". The Wiesenthal Center said, "By breaking into these Jewish institutions, it was insinuated that the entire Jewish community of Venezuela was associated with this crime and suggests the collective responsibility in which every Jew is endangered." According to the Roth Institute, media analysts claimed the raid was "a way of threatening the Jewish community and was linked to the government's ties to Arab countries and radical Islamic states. In fact, at the time of the raid, Chavez was visiting Iran for discussions on oil, an interest common to both these anti-American states".

Venezuela's chief rabbi condemned the raid's "economy of intimidation", noting that "there is not a single Jewish family in Caracas that was not affected. Many of us have children in the school, grandchildren, great-grandchildren—or friends. An attack on the school is the most effective way of jolting the entire Jewish population."

==== 2007 Jewish community center raid ====
According to the Venezuelan Confederation of Israelite Associations (CAIV, Confederación de Asociaciones Israelitas de Venezuela), agents of the DISIP secret police agency conducted a pre-dawn raid on the Hebraic Social, Cultural and Sports Center (Centro Social Cultural y Deportivo Hebraica) the day of the 2007 constitutional referendum in which Chávez's proposed constitutional and term limit reforms were defeated. On the Tuesday following the Sunday, December 2, referendum, representatives from the CAIV published a letter saying that dozens of DISIP agents had forcibly entered the community center at 12:40 a.m. on the day of the referendum, supposedly in search of weapons and drugs. According to the CAIV, the DISIP agents left after an exhaustive search, without finding any irregularities.

The CAIV emphasized that the Jewish community in Venezuela had a national presence of more than 200 years of peaceful and democratic cooperation, and said, "We denounce this new and unjustifiable act against the Venezuelan Jewish community, and we express our rejection and profound indignation."

==== 2009 Israel conflict and synagogue attacks ====
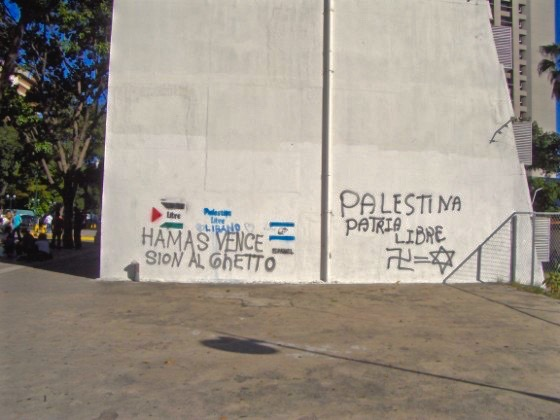
Antisemitic graffiti in Caracas in support of Hamas.

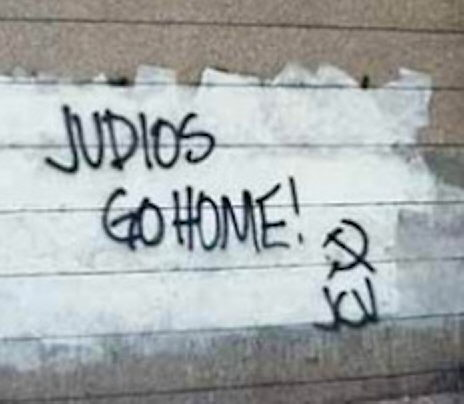
Graffiti on the wall of the Israeli Embassy in Caracas, saying "Jews (Judios) go home!" and signed by the JCV.

Following the onset of the 2009 Israel-Gaza conflict, the Venezuelan government expressed disagreement with Israel's actions. On 5 January, President Chávez accused the United States of poisoning Palestinian president Yasser Arafat in order to destabilize the Middle East. He also described the offensive by Israel as a Palestinian "holocaust". Days later, the Venezuelan foreign ministry called Israel's actions "state terrorism" and announced the expulsion of the Israeli ambassador and some of the embassy staff. Following the order of expulsion of the Israeli ambassador, incidents targeting various Jewish institutions occurred in Venezuela. Protests occurred in Caracas with demonstrators throwing shoes at the Israeli Embassy while some sprayed graffiti on the facility. At the Tiféret Israel Synagogue, individuals spray painted "Property of Islam" on its walls. Later that month, the synagogue was targeted again.

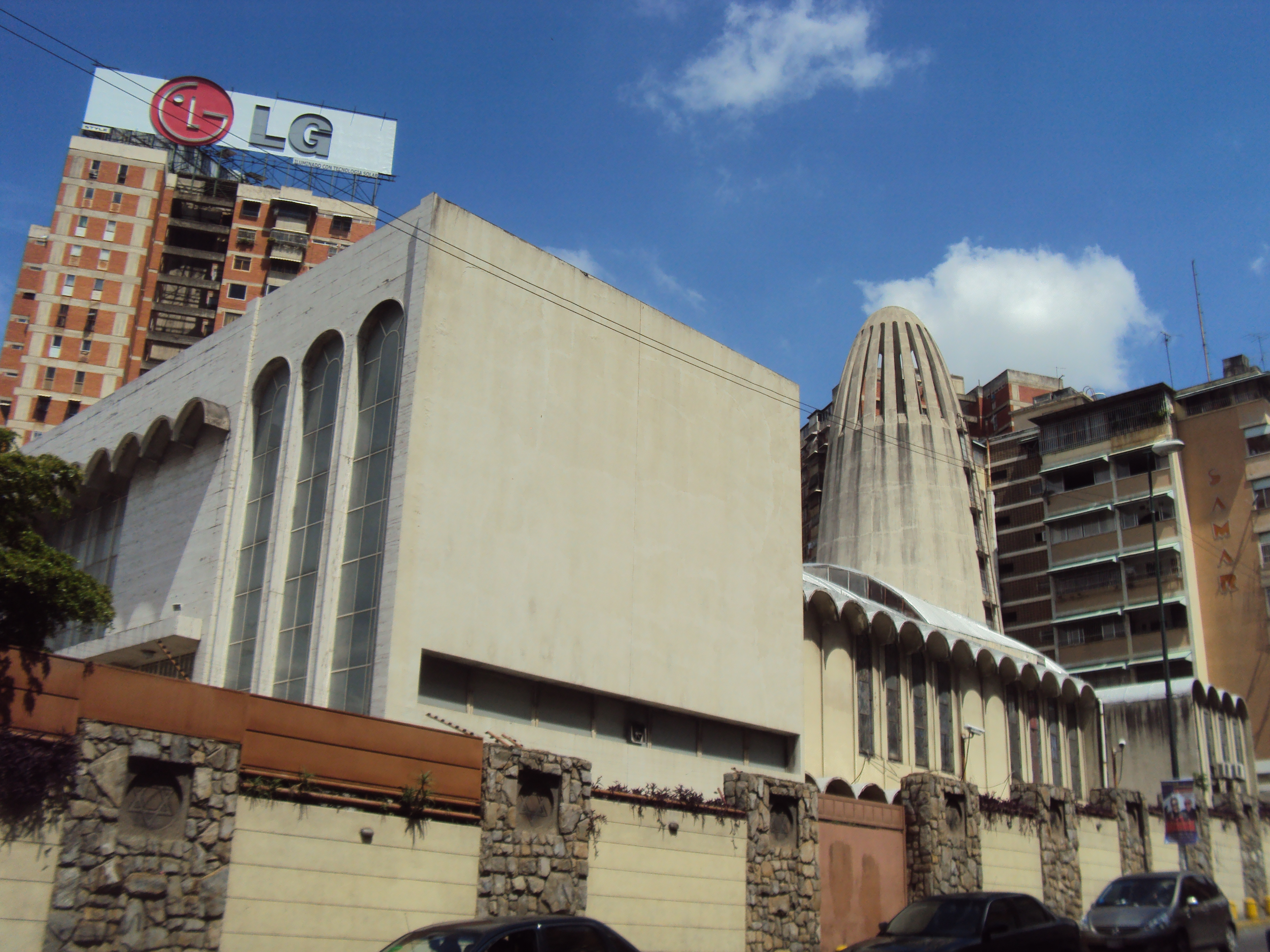
The Tiféret Israel Synagogue in Caracas was attacked in 2009.

During the night of January 31, 2009, an armed gang consisting of 15 unidentified men broke into Tiféret Israel Synagogue, the synagogue of the Israelite Association of Venezuela, the oldest synagogue in the Venezuelan capital Caracas and occupied the building for several hours. The gang tied and gagged security guards before destroying offices and the place where holy books were kept; this happened during the Jewish shabbat. They daubed the walls with antisemitic and anti-Israeli graffiti that called for Jews to be expelled from the country. They had also stolen a database that listed Jews who lived in Venezuela. Nicolás Maduro, who was the acting Foreign Minister at the time, condemned the act as a "criminal act of vandalism". The Information Minister Jesse Chacón also condemned the attack and denied it had any connection with the government. US politicians called on President Hugo Chávez to protect the country's Jews following the outbreak. Sixteen Republicans and Democrats wrote a letter demanding an "end to the intimidation and harassment of the Jewish community."

In February 2009 the Venezuelan authorities arrested 7 police officers and 4 civilians, with two individuals were associated with the synagogue, for robbery. According to the El Universal, the CICPC's report stated that one of ten arrested defendants, Edgar Alexander Cordero, a bodyguard for a rabbi at the synagogue and a Metropolitan police officer, asked the rabbi for a loan which he refused to give. Cordero decided to rob the synagogue of money, which he believed was locked in its safes. According to Interior Minister Tarek El Aissami, antisemitic vandalism had merely been a tactic, "First, to weaken the investigation, and second, to direct the blame toward the national government."

Shlomo Cohen, Israel's ambassador in Caracas received a call from the Venezuelan government on 6 February that all Israeli embassy staff had 72 hours to leave the country. The next day on 7 February, President Chávez organized an anti-Israel march saying that Israel was committing "Nazi-like atrocities" in Gaza. On Venezuelan television, Venezuelan government officials were seen wearing kaffiyehs, Palestinian flags were waved in the streets and images of praying Muslims in mosques were shared. Shortly after Israeli consul Danny Biran was called in to assist with the dismantling of the embassy, President Chávez broke diplomatic ties with Israel, all Israeli diplomats lost their diplomatic immunity and were deemed illegal aliens. Consul Biran called for help from others in Buenos Aires, Panama, New York and Miami and on arrival, all of them were intercepted at the airport, held for 9 hours, then escorted to the embassy by Venezuelan army personnel. Venezuelan troops monitored the Israeli diplomats closely, taking photographs and interrogating those who entered the embassy. Consul Biran stated that the military personnel were under the direct orders of President Chávez and two officers, one with alleged ties to Hezbollah. On 22 February, the flag of Israel and the embassy sign was taken down and the Israeli Embassy in Caracas was closed.

Four days later on the evening of 26 February, a homemade bomb was thrown into the Orthodox Beit Shmuel in Caracas. Whilst there were no injuries, damage was caused to windows and a car. The explosive was believed to be a grenade or pipe bomb.

==== Other antisemitic incidents ====
On November 28, 2012, in Mérida, a variety of antisemitic imagery, including swastikas, was found painted throughout the city.

In 2013, over 4,000 antisemitic incidents occurred in Venezuela according to Venezuela's main Jewish organization, CAIV. Throughout the 2013 presidential campaign one of the two leading candidates, Maduro, continued a use of anti-American rhetoric ad motifs similar to those used by Chávez in the past. In this vein, he accused his opponent, Capriles, of being supported by the power of "Zionist capitalism." Maduro claimed that Capriles acted against the interests of Venezuela, in favor of Israel, and on behalf of the "Jewish Lobby." During this time there were also frequent references to Capriles' Jewish roots in an effort to harm his campaign.

On December 30, 2014, individuals sprayed antisemitic graffiti on the AIV del Este Sephardic synagogue in Caracas. The graffiti included a swastika and a Celtic cross, symbols used by neo-Nazi organizations. The number "6,000,000", the number of Jews killed during the Holocaust, was also written with question marks. The Anti-Defamation League condemned the actions and reminded President Nicolas Maduro along with his government that he was "responsible for the safety and well-being of Venezuela’s Jewish community".

In May 2017, in light of big anti government protests, Maduro compared his government to the Jews during the Holocaust. He stated during a cabinet meeting "We are the new Jews of the 21th century that Hitler pursued," he then carried on saying "We don't carry the yellow Star of David, we carry red hearts that are filled with the desire to fight for human dignity. And we are going to defeat them, these 21th century Nazis." Furthermore, Diosdado Cabello, the former speaker of Venezuelas parliament as well as an ally of Maduro, compared the processions of the protestors to the Kristallnacht on his popular TV show. Leaders of CAIV, which is the parent organization for Venezuelan jewry condemned the usage of the Holocaust for political objectives. Dina Siegel Vann, director of the American Jewish Committees Latino and Latin American affairs, also denounced the fact that Maduro had used the Holocaust to safeguard himself and his regime while assailing and slandering the opposition.

On 22 August 2022, in an interview with journalist Vladimir Villegas, Chavista businessman Esteban Trapiello denied the Holocaust, replying when asked: "Everyone tells their own story and I was not in that story. I don't read, I watch movies. Because the movies are Hollywood movies, they tell me the story one way. The story depends on who is telling it". He also expressed in the same interview that he would like to have lunch with Adolf Hitler to ask him "why he didn't finish what he set out to do", as well as describing Venezuelan migrants as "idiots". The Confederation of Israelite Associations of Venezuela strongly condemned his declarations, declaring that his statements were a hate crime.

The Venezuelan government has also numerous times blamed "Zionists" for both domestic unrest and international tensions and conflicts involving Venezuela. For example in August 2024 after the rigged elections and during subsequent protests against the regime, president Nicolás Maduro claimed that the protests were financed and supported by "international Zionism". He further claimed during a televised address that "All the communication power of Zionism, which controls all the social networks, the satellites and all the power is behind this coup d'état" This was condemned by Deborah Lipstedt, US special envoy to monitor and combat antisemitism, who blamed him for parroting old conspiracy theories that Jews control the world. During Venezuela's diplomatic conflict against Argentina and speaking in January 2025 about the arrest of an Argentinian military officer in Venezuela, Maduro called the Argentine government "Nazi and Zionist". The statement was lambasted by Argentinas Jewish community who said it minimized the Holocaust and criticized him for using Zionism as an invalidating insult while it embodies the legitimate existence of Israel. Again in November 2025 in light of the US military buildup in the Caribbean, Maduro said that "There are those who want to hand over this country to the devils - you know who right? The far right Zionists want to hand this country over to the devils." On January 3 2026 after the US operation to capture Maduro, Venezuelan vice president Delcy Rodríguez claimed that the operation "undoubtedly has Zionist undertones". The statement worried some members of Venezuelas Jewish community, both overseas and in Venezuela.
