= HispanTV =

Iranian Spanish-language news channel

- Type: State media
- Country: Iran

Programming
- Language: Spanish
- Picture format: 1080i HDTV (downscaled to 16:9 480i/576i for the SDTV feed)

Ownership
- Owner: Islamic Republic of Iran Broadcasting
- Key people: Ali Ejarehdar (General Director)
- Sister channels: IRINN, Al-Alam News Network, Press TV, iFilm

History
- Launched: 21 December 2011

Links
- Website: hispantv.com, Telegram, Twitter, Bluesky, LinkedIn

Availability

Terrestrial
- UHF (Puerto Rico): Channel 33.1 (Fajardo; WRUA); Channel 18.2 (Naranjito; WECN)

HispanTV is an Iranian Spanish-language news channel operated by Islamic Republic of Iran Broadcasting, Iran's state-controlled broadcaster. It began broadcasting in December 2011.

HispanTV's programming has been distributed in Venezuela, Spain, Argentina, Cuba and other countries worldwide. The channel is similar to Press TV, an English language news channel and Al-Alam, an Arabic satellite TV station also owned by the Iranian state.

HispanTV has foreign journalists from Argentina, Chile, Honduras, Mexico, Nicaragua, Russia, Spain, and Venezuela. It also has journalists from Iran who speak Spanish.

The stated goal of HispanTV is to offer an opportunity for cultural exchange through television and web broadcasts between Latin-American citizens of Iranian descent, Hispanics of the United States, Muslim minorities of the Hispanophone world, and Spanish-speaking foreign residents in Iran.

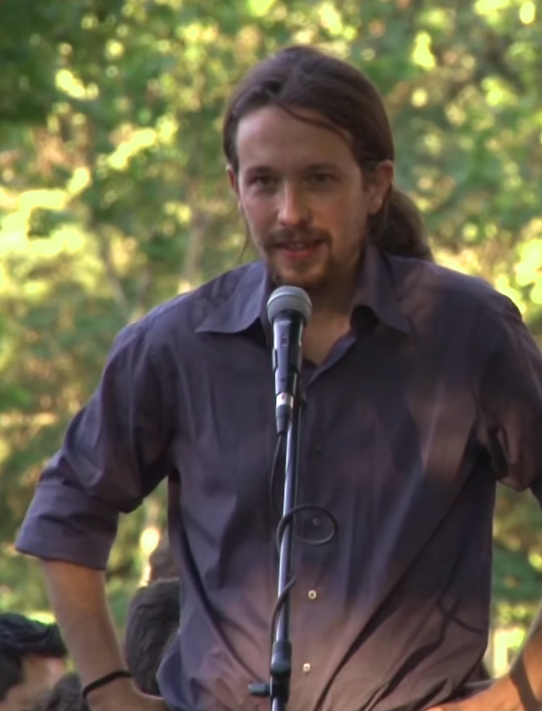
Pablo Iglesias Turrión, host of HispanTV program Fort Apache.

== Controversy ==
=== Sanctions ===
In July 2013, HispanTV and other Iranian channels were removed from several European and American satellites. HispanTV is no longer aired in Spain as Spain is a member of the EU and HispanTV now exclusively broadcasts in Hispanic America. HispanTV "tried to bypass sanctions by providing live feeds of its networks through YouTube". HispanTV's YouTube channel has since been blocked.

=== Antisemitism allegations ===
The Anti-Defamation League has stated that "HispanTV regularly broadcasts anti-Semitic and anti-Zionist conspiracy theories" and that Iran's "influence in Latin America has been a strong feature of the Iranian government's foreign policy in the last decade, and HispanTV serves as a platform to spread Tehran's conspiracy theories, Holocaust denial and anti-Semitism". HispanTV claimed that the COVID-19 pandemic "is the result of a Zionist plot. ... This virus serves Zionism's goals to decrease the number of people in the world and prevent it from increasing."

According to the Antisemitism in Venezuela 2013 report by the Venezuelan Confederation of Israelite Associations (CAIV), which focuses on the issue of antisemitism in Venezuela, "distorted news, omissions and false accusations" of Israel originate from Iranian media in Latin America, especially from HispanTV. Such "distorted news" is then repeated by the Russia's RT and Cuba's Prensa Latina, and Venezuela's state media, including SIBCI, AVN, TeleSUR, Venezolana de Televisión (VTV), Alba TV, La Radio del Sur, Radio Nacional de Venezuela (RNV), YVKE Mundial, Correo del Orinoco and Ciudad CCS.

The documentary Plan Andinia: A New Jewish State ?, by Asela Villar, based on a conspiracy theory, suggests Israel is slowly planning to invade Patagonia. It is aired on Real Stories network, belonging to Little Dot Studios and All3Media.
