= Bolivarian Communication and Information System =

Venezuelan state media conglomerate

- Sistema Bolivariano de Comunicación e Información

Agency overview
- Formed: 2006
- Headquarters: Caracas, Venezuela
- Agency executive: Jacqueline Faria, Minister of Popular Power for Communication and Information
- Parent agency: Ministry of Popular Power for Communication and Information
- Website: www.sibci.gob.ve

The Bolivarian Communication and Information System (SiBCI; Spanish: Sistema Bolivariano de Comunicación e Información) is a conglomerate of Venezuela state media that manages public radio, television, and multimedia attached to the Ministry of Popular Power for Communication and Information. It is located on channel 24.4 in Digital Terrestrial Television in Venezuela.

== Public media ==
After reviewing the possible reach and penetration of the different types of media, the Venezuelan government decided to assign specific functions:

=== Television ===
- Venezolana de Television - News, broadcasts began in August 1964.
- TVes - Generalist, started broadcasting in 2007.
- ViVe - Educational and Cultural broadcasts began in November 2003.
- Avila TV - Broadcasts began in July 2005
- 123TV: Children's channel, started broadcasting in 2011
- ConCiencia TV: Science and technology, started broadcasting in April 2013
- ShowVen TV: Music, started broadcasting in June 2009
- Colombeia TV: Educational channel, started broadcasting in September 2005
- TV FANB: Military, started broadcasting in December 2013
- TeleSUR - News and culture international broadcasts began in July 2005.

=== Radio ===
==== Local radio ====
- Alba Ciudad 96.3
- Ciudad VLC Radio 89.9FM

==== National radio ====
- Radio Nacional de Venezuela (RNV) - began broadcasting in July 1936.

- RNV Information Channel
- RNV Classic Channel
- RNV Musical Channel
- Indigenous RNV Channel
- RNV Youth Channel
- RNV Regional Channels: Central Region, Los Llanos Region
- International RNV Channel.

- YVKE Mundial Radio

==== International radio ====
- Radio of the South - Broadcast in Spanish, Portuguese, English and French.

=== Newspapers ===
- Correo del Orinoco - launched in 2009 with versions in Spanish and English.
- Ciudad CCS - launched in 2009.
- Ciudad VLC - launched in Valencia in 2012.
- Ciudad Cojedes - launched in San Carlos on 23 October 2013.
- Ciudad Guárico - launched in San Juan de los Morros.
- Ciudad Petare - released in Petare.

=== Multimedia ===
- Agencia Venezolana de Noticias - created in 2005 with versions in Spanish and English.

=== Other ===
==== National Assembly media ====
- Asamblea Nacional Televisión (ANTV) - Transmission Assembly broadcasts began in March 2005.
- AN Radio - starts broadcasting in 2009, broadcasting in radio the sessions of the National Assembly.
