= AVN =

AVN may refer to:

== Medicine ==
- Atrioventricular node, special region of conducting tissue in the heart
- Avascular necrosis, medical condition

== Transport ==
- Air Vanuatu, by ICAO airline code
- Avignon Airport, in southeastern France
- Avonmouth railway station, UK, by National Rail code

== Companies and organisations ==
- AVN (magazine), Adult Video News, trade magazine for the pornographic industry
- AVN (Albania), television network
- Australian Vaccination-risks Network, anti-vaccination lobby group
- FK AVN, former name of FK ASK (1923–1970), former Latvian football club
- Agencia Venezolana de Noticias, Venezuelan state news agency
- Australian Army Aviation

== Other uses ==
- Academy of Military Sciences (Akademii Voyennykh Nauk—AVN), in Moscow
- Avon (county), historic county in England, Chapman code
- AVN Award, American pornographic film award
- Alien vs Ninja, 2010 Japanese film
- Audio-Visual Navigation, feature of some motor vehicles
