= María T. Martelo =

Venezuelan climatologist

María T. Martelo is a Venezuelan climatologist.

Martelo works in Caracas in a research center attached to the Directorate for Hydrology and Meteorology of the Ministry of Environment and Natural Resources. Extreme weather events are a focus of her work.

Due to her research, Martelo was appointed to the Intergovernmental Panel on Climate Change. In 2007, as vice-chair of Working Group I: The Physical Science Basis of Climate Change, she was involved in the creation of the IPCC Fourth Assessment Report. In early 2007 she was replaced at the IPCC by Dr. Miriam Diaz, the new appointee by the Government of Venezuela.
