= Environment minister =

Political role

An environment minister (also known as minister of the environment or secretary of the environment or minister for environment) is a cabinet position charged with protecting the natural environment and promoting wildlife conservation. The duties of an environmental minister depends largely of the needs of individual countries or heads of government. Some powers pertaining to environment protection might be also found within transport ministers, energy ministers, interior secretaries, and other officials such as United States Administrator of the Environmental Protection Agency.

The world's first minister of the environment was the British politician Peter Walker from the Conservative Party, who was appointed in 1970.

== Country-related articles ==
=== Africa ===
- Botswana: Ministry of Environment and Tourism (Botswana)
- Ethiopia: Minister of Environment, Forest and Climate Change
- South Africa: Minister of Water and Environmental Affairs

=== Americas ===
- Argentina: Ministry of the Environment and Sustainable Development
- Bolivia: Minister of Environment and Water
- Brazil: Minister of the Environment and Climate Change
- Canada: Minister of the Environment
- Chile: Ministry for the Environment
- Colombia: Ministry of Environment and Sustainable Development
- Costa Rica: Ministry of Environment and Energy
- Cuba: Ministry of Science, Technology and Environment
- Haiti: Ministry of the Environment
- Mexico: Secretary of the Environment
- Nicaragua: Ministry of the Environment and Natural Resources
- Peru: Ministry of Environment
- United States: Administrator of the Environmental Protection Agency and Secretary of the Interior
- Uruguay: Ministry of Environment
- Venezuela: Ministry of Environment and Natural Resources

=== Asia ===
- Azerbaijan: Ministry of Ecology and Natural Resources
- Bangladesh: Ministry of Environment, Forest and Climate Change (Bangladesh)
- China: Minister of Ecology and Environment
  - Hong Kong: Secretary for the Environment
- Indonesia: Ministry of Environment and Ministry of Forestry
- Japan: Minister of the Environment
- South Korea: Ministry of Environment
- Malaysia: Minister of Environment and Water
- Nepal: Minister of Forests and Environment
- Pakistan: Minister of Environment
- Philippines: Secretary of Environment and Natural Resources
- Singapore: Ministry of Sustainability and the Environment
- Taiwan: Ministry of Environment
- Thailand: Ministry of Natural Resources and Environment
- Vietnam: Ministry of Natural Resources and Environment

=== Europe ===
- Albania: Ministry of Environment, Forests and Water Administration
- Austria: List of Ministers of the Environment
- Czech Republic: Ministry of the Environment
- Denmark: Minister of the Environment
- European Union: Commissioner for the Environment
- Finland: Minister of Environment
- France: Minister of Ecology (as of 2017, Ministry for an Ecological and Solidary Transition)
- Germany: Federal Minister for the Environment, Nature Conservation, Building and Nuclear Safety
- Greece: Minister for the Environment, Energy and Climate Change
- Iceland: Minister for the Environment and Natural Resources
- Ireland: Minister for Climate, Energy and the Environment
- Italy: Ministry of the Environment
- Lithuania: Ministry of Environment
- Moldova: Ministry of Environment
- Netherlands: Minister of Climate Policy and Green Growth
- Norway: Minister of the Environment
- Romania: Ministry of Environment and Climate Change
- Sweden: Minister of the Environment
- Turkey: Ministry of Environment, Urbanisation and Climate Change
- Ukraine: Environment Ministry
- United Kingdom: Secretary of State for Environment, Food and Rural Affairs
  - Northern Ireland: Minister for the Environment
  - Scotland: Cabinet Secretary for Rural Affairs and the Environment
  - Wales: Cabinet Secretary for Climate Change and Rural Affairs

=== Oceania ===
- Australia: Minister for the Environment
  - Minister for Environment (New South Wales)
  - Minister for Environment and Natural Resources (Northern Territory)
  - Minister for Environment (Western Australia)
  - Minister for the Environment (Victoria)
- New Zealand: Minister for the Environment

== See also ==
- List of years in the environment
