= Israel–Venezuela relations =

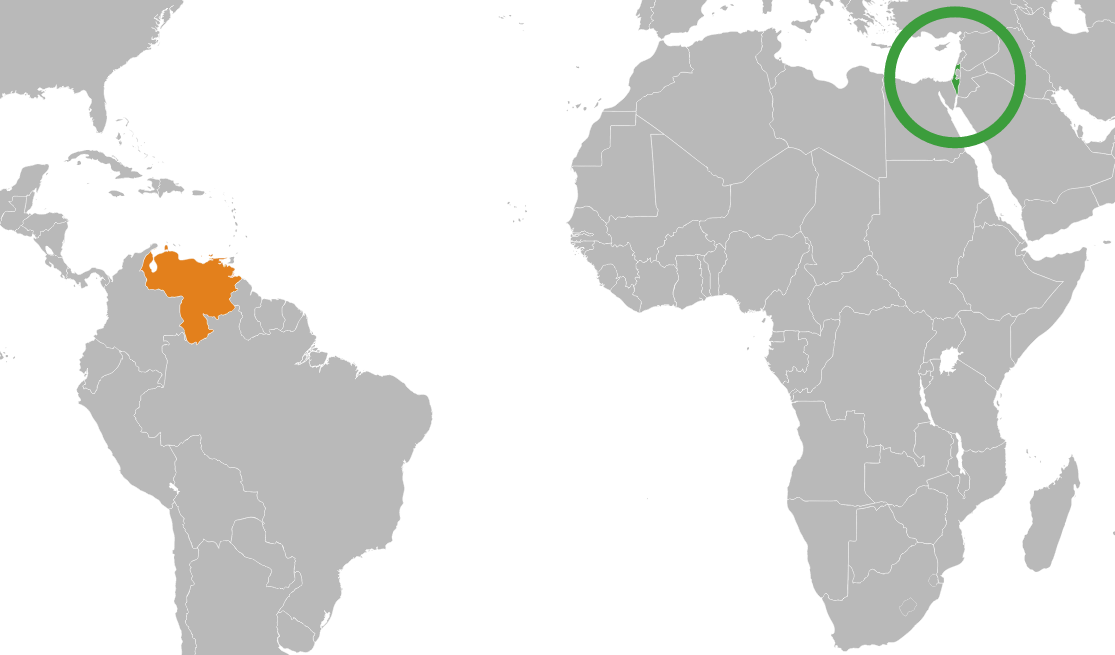
- Israel: Venezuela

Israel–Venezuela relations refer to foreign relations between Israel and Venezuela. In 2026, both countries resumed diplomatic relations, having had no relations between 2009 to 2026 under the United Socialist Party of Venezuela government, during which time Canada served as Israel's protecting power in Venezuela through its embassy in Caracas, while Spain served as Venezuela's protecting power in Israel through its embassy in Tel Aviv.

Venezuela voted in favor of Israeli membership in the United Nations in 1949, and established diplomatic ties.

Though relations between the two countries were traditionally strong, they soured considerably under the presidency of Hugo Chávez, for two reasons: Chávez opposed the 2006 Lebanon War, and Israel opposed Chávez's foreign policy relating to Iran. Chávez also positioned himself on the world stage as opposed to American foreign policy—the US and Israel are partners in defense and international relations, specifically relating to the Middle East. In the wake of the Gaza War (2008–2009), Venezuela broke all diplomatic ties with Israel, condemning its actions. On April 27, 2009, Venezuelan foreign minister (and future president) Nicolás Maduro met with Palestinian National Authority foreign affairs minister Riyad al-Maliki in Caracas, where formal diplomatic relations were established.

== History ==
Venezuela voted in favor of the United Nations Partition Plan for Palestine on November 29, 1947, and established diplomatic ties with Israel later on.

Venezuela's first representative in Israel, Romulo Araujo, arrived in 1959/60 and was based in the King David Hotel in Jerusalem. A year later, the mission was located in the Katamon neighborhood at 28 Rachel Imenu, in Jerusalem where it stayed until 1980. In 1962 ties were upgraded, so that full ambassadors were exchanged. From 1960 to 1964 Vincente Gerbasi, a poet, served as the Venezuelan representative and ambassador. He was replaced by Pedro Abreu, and in 1969/70 Napoleon Gimenez took over. In 1980, when Venezuela and many other nations chose to move their embassies outside of Jerusalem, Luis La Corte was the ambassador. In 1962, Gerbasi presented an Arab village with a tractor from Venezuela. During the Six-Day War many Venezuelan Jews went to Israel to fight for Israel.

When the United Nations passed General Assembly Resolution 3379 on November 10, 1975, "determin[ing] that Zionism is a form of racism and racial discrimination", Venezuela abstained. The resolution was later revoked in 1991.

Milos Alcalay served as Venezuela's Ambassador to Israel from 1992 to 1995. Israeli Foreign Minister Shimon Peres visited Caracas in January 1995, during the second Caldera administration, to "cement ties with friendly countries, and to deepen cooperation in areas of mutual benefit". Venezuela's Foreign Minister noted that "The reception that was given for Foreign Minister Peres was unprecedented."

== Under the Bolivarian Republic of Venezuela ==
In 2005, the Executive Director of the American Jewish Committee reported "an active Israeli embassy in Caracas and modest but growing bilateral trade."

=== 2005 F-16 deal ===
In 2005, Israel had an agreement with Venezuela to service and upgrade its U.S.-built F-16 fighter jets, but the Sharon administration angered the U.S. State Department when it sold aerial drones to China. In October 2005, the State Department prevented the Israeli-Venezuelan F-16 deal by refusing to grant export licensing approval to the Israeli government. JINSA (Jewish Institute for the National Security of America) reported that the State Department "request[ed]" the Israeli government end all military contracts with Venezuela that involved U.S.-derived technology and refrain from future sales of Israeli military technology to Venezuela.

=== 2006 Israel-Lebanon conflict ===
In response to the Israeli airstrike of Qana, on July 31, Vice President José Vicente Rangel said, "This murder of dozens of women and children has no justification whatsoever. The UN and other powerful nations shared blame for the attack because they had responded to Israel's military campaign in Palestine and Lebanon with silence and omissions. Venezuela has never had any anti-Jewish attitudes, recognizes the existence of Israel as a state, welcomes the Jewish community and guarantees its total respect."

Al Jazeera's Dima Khatib, reported that Chávez was the first head of state to harshly condemn Israel over the Israeli-Lebanon conflict, even before any Arab or Muslim country. On August 3, 2006 Chávez ordered the Venezuelan charge d'affaires to Israel to return from Tel Aviv to Caracas, protesting the 2006 Israel-Lebanon conflict. According to The Miami Herald, two days later, on his Sunday radio program, "Aló Presidente" ("Hello President"), Chávez accused Israel of "going mad and inflicting on the people of Palestine and Lebanon the same thing they have criticized, and with reason: the Holocaust. But this is a new Holocaust" with the help of the United States, which he described as a terrorist country. He went on to say that the United States refuses "to allow the [U.N.] Security Council to make a decision to halt the genocide Israel is committing against the Palestinian and Lebanese people". The Israeli government responded by recalling the Israeli ambassador to Venezuela. Chávez went on to repeat the comparison with the Holocaust several days later.

In the Arab world Chávez's actions and comments saw widespread praise, with Al-Ahram Weekly commenting that Chávez had "emerged as the most popular leader within the Arab world". According to the Jewish Telegraphic Agency, Chávez "is pursuing closer strategic relations with Arab countries and Iran, and is emerging as a key supporter of Iranian President Mahmoud Ahmadinejad. Although it's not unusual for OPEC members to maintain relations, Carlos Romero, a political scientist at the Universidad Central de Venezuela, says that 'since the foundation of Israel, Venezuela has maintained equilibrium between its interests in Israel and Arab countries. Chávez has broken this'."

Venezuelan Oil Minister Rafael Ramirez said on August 13, 2006, that Venezuela would not endorse an OPEC oil embargo in response to the Middle East crisis, but did say, "What we have been warning and denouncing over the past two years is the permanent aggression of U.S. foreign policy toward OPEC producers" which continue to "pressure" the oil market. Ramirez attributed record high oil prices to U.S. "policy of permanent aggression toward Venezuela, Iran" and "countries in the Persian Gulf."

On August 25, 2006, Reuters reported that Chávez had called for Israeli leaders to face a trial for genocide over killing in the Lebanon conflict. Speaking from Beijing, Chávez said the Jewish state had "done something similar or, perhaps worse, who knows, than what the Nazis did".

In August 2006, during Chávez's visit to Syria, El Universal reported that the Governments of Syria and Venezuela demanded that Israel retire from the Golan Heights.

=== 2008 ===
In 2008, during the spat with Colombia over the latter's intrusion into Ecuador, Chávez said "the Colombian government has become the Israel of Latin America." In doing so he also reiterated his criticism of the Israel Defense Forces' strikes on Palestinian militants. His remarks were criticized by the Israeli ambassador to Argentina Rafael Eldad accusing Chávez of "introducing the culture of hatred into Latin America" while calling for messages of peace and calm for the region.

=== Gaza War (2009) ===
On January 5, Chávez called the violence "state terrorism", saying of the attacks "the Holocaust, that is what is happening right now in Gaza". Chávez accused Israel of "flagrant violations of International Law" and stated that the Israeli Prime Minister and American President be tried at the International Criminal Court. Venezuela expelled Israel's ambassador to Venezuela and part of the embassy personnel, and Hugo Chávez called for Ehud Olmert to be tried for war crimes. On January 14, Chávez broke off diplomatic ties and expelled the Israeli ambassador and his staff over the 2008-09 Gaza War which left 1,000 Palestinians dead. The Israeli government retaliated by expelling Venezuelan diplomats from the country.

On April 27, 2009, Venezuela officially recognised the existence of the State of Palestine.

In April 2009, Israel selected Canada as its protecting power in Venezuela. In September 2009, Venezuela's Foreign Ministry appointed Spain to be its protecting power in Israel.

=== 2010 ===
At a rally in June 2010, Chávez alleged that “Israel is financing the Venezuelan opposition. There are even groups of Israeli terrorists, of the Mossad, who are after me trying to kill me.” In response, AJC Executive Director David Harris stated that: “These baseless accusations by President Chávez are downright dangerous and are used by him to bolster his own political standing.” In the same speech, Chávez called Israel a "terrorist and murderous state", and cursed it by saying: "I take this opportunity to condemn again from the bottom of my soul and my guts the State of Israel: Cursed be, State of Israel! Cursed is cursed, terrorists and assassins!".

During a visit by Syrian President Bashar al-Assad to Venezuela in June 2010, Chávez accused Israel of being "the assassin arm of the United States" and that "one day the genocidal state of Israel will be put into its place."

=== 2017 ===
In March 2017, President Nicolás Maduro announced a "desire" to re-establish relations with Israel following a meeting with Venezuela's Sephardic chief rabbi Isaac Cohen.

=== 2019 ===
On January 27, 2019, Israeli Prime Minister Benjamin Netanyahu recognized the president of the National Assembly of Venezuela, Juan Guaidó, as interim president of Venezuela.

Later that year in August 2019, Guaido appointed Rabbi Pynchas Brener as the new ambassador to Israel.

=== 2026 ===
In early 2026, following the United States Intervention in Venezuela, reports emerged that Venezuelan oil was being shipped to Israel for the first time in several years. The Venezuelan government denied these claims.

After the 2026 Venezuela earthquakes in June, Israel provided search and rescue aid through the Ministry of Foreign Affairs, the Israel Defense Forces and the Home Front Command, despite the two nations not having bilateral relations since 2009. At a press conference, interim president Delcy Rodríguez thanked the Israeli search and rescue team that arrived to assist and expressed appreciation for their operations on the ground, which had been arranged through connections with Venezuela's Jewish community.

On 11 August, Israel and Venezuela announced the resumption of consular relations after 17 years. Félix Plasencia, Venezuela's Minister of Foreign Affairs and Foreign Trade, cited the Israeli assistance provided in response to the pair of June earthquakes as a key factor behind the resumption of consular relations between the two countries.'

== See also ==
- Antisemitism in Venezuela
- History of the Jews in Venezuela
- Venezuelan Jews in Israel
- List of Venezuelan Jews
- Foreign policy of Hugo Chávez
- International recognition of Israel
