= Ministry of Communication and Information (Venezuela) =

Government ministry of Venezuela

Ministry of Popular Power for Communication and Information
- Ministerio del Poder Popular para la Comunicación y la Información

Agency overview
- Dissolved: 2015
- Jurisdiction: Government of Venezuela
- Headquarters: Caracas, Venezuela
- Annual budget: ≈ $380 million (2015)
- Agency executive: Desireé Santos Amaral, Minister of Popular Power for Communication and Information
- Child agencies: National Commission of Telecommunications; Bolivarian Communication and Information System
- Website: www.minci.gob.ve

The Ministry of Popular Power for Communication and Information (Spanish: Ministerio del Poder Popular para la Comunicación y la Información, Minci) is a public ministry of the Government of Venezuela dedicated to communication, informing the Venezuelan public and promoting the Venezuelan government.

== Structure ==
- Minister of Popular Power for Communication and Information
- General Directorate Office
- General Directorate of Presidential Communications
- Vice Minister of Communication and Information
- Vice Minister of Television
- Vice Minister of Radio
- Vice Minister of Print Media
- Vice Minister of Social Networks

=== Organs and Affiliated Entities Ministry ===
- National Commission of Telecommunications
- Bolivarian Communication and Information System

=== Affiliated media organizations ===
Affiliated media organizations include:

- TVes
- TeleSUR
- Radio Nacional de Venezuela
- Agencia Venezolana de Noticias
- Venezolana de Televisión
- YVKE Mundial Radio
- Ciudad CCS
- Avila TV
- Radio of the South
- Correo del Orinoco
- Alba TV
- Asamblea Nacional Televisión
- ViVe
- Colombeia

== Ministers ==
Period	Minister
2025 –	Freddy Ñáñez
2020 – 2025	Freddy Ñáñez
2017 – 2020	Jorge Rodríguez Gómez
2016 – 2017	Ernesto Villegas
2016 – 2016	Luis José Marcano Salazar
2015 – 2016	Desiree Santos Amaral
13 October 2014 – 28 April 2015	Jacqueline Faría
3 August 2013 – 13 October 2014	Delcy Rodríguez
13 October 2012 - 3 August 2013	Ernesto Villegas
December 2010 - 12 October 2012	Andrés Izarra
July - December 2010	Mauricio Rodríguez
? - July 2010	Tania Díaz
2009 - 2010	Blanca Eekhout
2008 - 2009	Jesse Chacón
Dec 2007 - July 2008	Andrés Izarra
Mar 2006 - Dec 2007	Willian Lara
9 March 2005 - Mar 2006	Yuri Pimentel
September 2004 - March 2005	Andrés Izarra
? - 2004	Jesse Chacón, Nora Uribe

== Censorship ==
The Institute Press and Society (Ipys) has criticized freedom of information and expression in Venezuela, though the Ministry of Popular Power for Communication and Information responded to these allegations by criticizing the Ipys report due to its alleged funding from United States organizations, such as the National Endowment for Democracy.

== See also ==
- Bolivarian propaganda
- Censorship in Venezuela
- The Commission of Propaganda, Agitation and Communication of the PSUV
- Media in Venezuela
