= Esteban Trapiello =

Venezuelan businessman

- Born: 16 November 1955 (age 70)
- Occupation: Businessman
- Other political affiliations: United Socialist Party of Venezuela

Jesús Esteban Trapiello González (born 16 November 1955) is a Venezuelan businessman linked to Chavismo. He has been a director of the television channel TVes and is currently president of the regional channel TeleAragua and of the radio station Aragueña 99.5 Fm of the National Network of Public Media of the governor's office of Aragua state. Trapiello has been denounced for using social networks to discredit and harass opponents.

== Career ==
Trapiello is president of the regional television channel TeleAragua and of the radio station Aragueña 99.5 Fm of the National Public Media System of the Aragua state government. He has also been a director of the TVes television channel.

For 2016 he had focused on expanding his own business and, at the request of the governor of Aragua, Tareck El Aissami, on extending the reach of the regional television station. To meet both goals Trapiello has relied on the company TyH Producciones Musicales, owned by him and his partner Harry Camba, vice-president of Telearagua and Aragüeña 99.5 FM, which has served as part of an alliance between the state channel, the private television channel Meridiano Televisión and the international GolTV (Latin America).

An analysis by Armando.info determined that the contract between TyH Producciones Musicales and the television station dependent on the governor's office represented a conflict of interest, as both are directed by Trapiello and Camba, and that it may violate the norms established in the Law against Corruption, which establishes sanctions for public administration officials who take advantage of their position for their own benefits.

Trapiello has used Twitter to discredit and harass tweeters, followers or individuals who have opposed his position. On 8 January 2022, the non-governmental organization Espacio Público and the National Union of Press Workers denounced harassment and a "smear campaign" against several Venezuelan journalists conducted by Trapiello.

On 22 August 2022, in an interview with journalist Vladimir Villegas, Trapiello denied the Holocaust, replying when asked: "Everyone tells their own story and I was not in that story. I don't read, I watch movies. Because the movies are Hollywood movies, they tell me the story one way. The story depends on who is telling it". He also expressed in the same interview that he would like to have lunch with Adolf Hitler to ask him "why he did not finish his work", as well as describing Venezuelan migrants as "idiots". The Confederation of Israelite Associations of Venezuela strongly condemned his declarations, declaring that his statements were a hate crime.

== Personal life ==
Trapiello is the son of Asturian migrants that fled from the Francisco Franco dictatorship in Spain.

== See also ==
- Antisemitism in Venezuela
- Law against Hatred
- Tareck El Aissami
