= Vanessa Davies =

Venezuelan journalist (born 1969)

Vanessa Davies (born 1969) is a Venezuelan journalist.

== Early life and education ==
Davies was born in El Tigre, Anzoátegui state, and studied social communication at the Central University of Venezuela (UCV).

== Career ==
As a reporter for El Nacional, Davies published reports about abuses by security and military deployed by Hugo Chávez, who initially denied the allegations. Davies was subsequently subpoenaed for questioning by the DISIP, which was criticized by Foreign Minister José Vicente Rangel, and followed by an admission by the Chávez government that security forces had killed more than sixty people in December 1999. Davies wrote an open letter calling for an investigation by the Prosecutor General's Office. Chávez invited Davies to accompany him to question the families she had interviewed, and Chávez then promised to improve human rights in Venezuela.

During her career at El Nacional, she also published two articles about "transgender and transformista life" in Venezuela. In 2006, the El Nacional publishing house published her book for teenagers about HIV/AIDS, titled VIH/Sida, Biografía de una pandemia (HIV/AIDS, Biography of a Pandemic).

Davies was the host of the investigative journalism program, Contragolpe, on Venezuelan television channel, VTV, until 10 March 2014.

From 2009 to January 2016, Davies worked as the editor of the Venezuelan newspaper, Correo del Orinoco.

== Political activities ==
In 2008 and 2009, she was a member of the United Socialist Party of Venezuela and served as a member of the national executive of the party as well as coordinator of media and communication.
