= Jewish cemetery of Coro =

Cemetery in Falcón, Venezuela

Jewish Cemetery of Coro Cementerio Judío de Coro
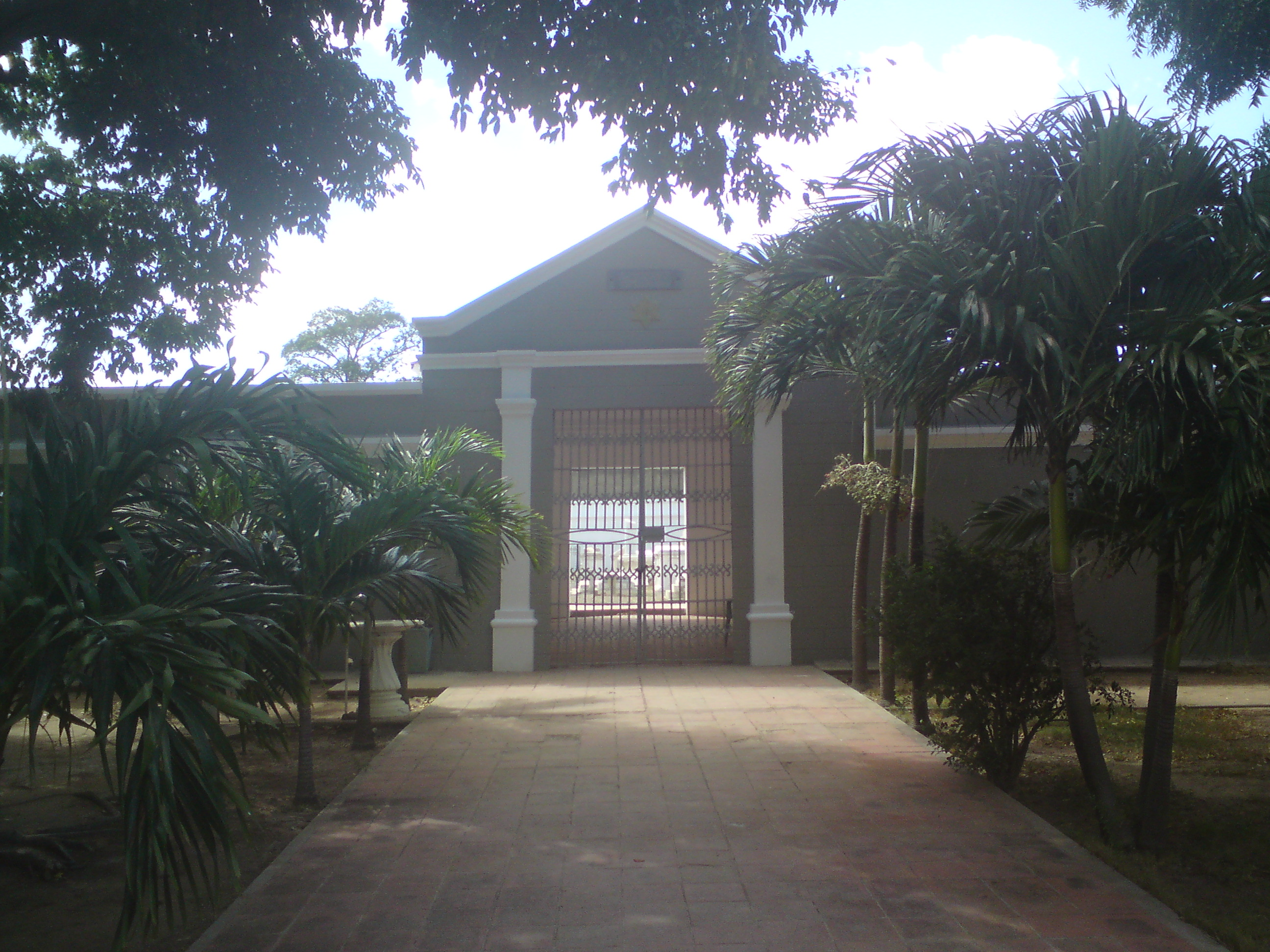
- Front of the Jewish Cemetery of Coro.
- Interactive map of Jewish Cemetery of Coro; Cementerio Judío de Coro

Details
- Established: 1832
- Location: Santa Ana de Coro
- Country: Venezuela
- Coordinates: 11.4079°N 69.6842°W
- Type: Jewish (open)
- Size: ?
- No. of graves: ?

The Jewish Cemetery of Coro (Spanish: Cementerio Judío de Coro) is the oldest Jewish cemetery in continuous use in the Americas.

== History ==
Its origin can be located in the 19th century, when Spanish and Portuguese Jews from the Dutch colony of Curaçao began to migrate to the Venezuelan city of Santa Ana de Coro in 1824. The cemetery started to function in 1832 by Mr. Joseph Curiel and his wife, Debora Levy Maduro, who had bought a plot of land near the city to bury their daughter, Hana. In the cemetery beautiful tombs and mausoleums can be found, in an impressive amount for the size and wealth of the city, which have remained as reminders of a time when Jews flourished in the city, thanks to the rise of trade with the Netherlands Antilles. The cemetery is located in the Pantano Abajo area, between Roosevelt Avenue and Zamora street. The cemetery is also the grave of the Venezuelan poet of Sephardic Jewish origin Elias David Curiel.

== Conservation issues ==
The cemetery was restored in the 1970s, thanks to the support of the Israelite Association of Venezuela and the national government. Since 2005 Santa Ana de Coro has been on the list of World Heritage in Danger due to heavy rains affecting all historic constructions in the city. An agreement was signed in 2009 between the Caracas Center for Sephardic Studies, representing the IAV, and Constructora Sambil, which is a construction company owned by Salomon Cohen of famous Jewish family, to rebuild the cemetery.

== See also ==
- History of the Jews in Venezuela
- Coro Synagogue
- History of the Jews in Curaçao
