= Milos Alcalay =

Venezuelan diplomat (born 1945)

Permanent Representative of Venezuela in the United Nations
- In office May 2001 – March 2004

Venezuela's Ambassador to Brazil
- In office 1997–2000

Venezuela Vice Minister of Foreign Affairs
- In office 1995–1996

Venezuela's Ambassador to Israel
- In office 1992–1995

Venezuela's Ambassador to Romania
- In office 1990–1992

Personal details
- Born: November 8, 1945 (age 80)
- Citizenship: Venezuela
- Education: Andrés Bello Catholic University School of Law; International Public Administration Institute of Paris; International Institute of Human Rights at Strasbourg; University of Paris
- Occupation: Diplomat
- Known for: Resigning as Venezuela's Ambassador to the United Nations in March 2004 to protest Venezuela President Hugo Chávez's policies.

Milos Alcalay (born 8 November 1945) is a Venezuelan diplomat. He has served as Venezuela's Ambassador to Romania, Israel, and Brazil, the Venezuela Vice Minister of External Affairs, and Venezuela's Permanent Representative to the United Nations. He resigned as Venezuela's Ambassador to the United Nations in March 2004 to protest Venezuela President Hugo Chávez's policies.

== Education ==
Alcalay graduated from the Andrés Bello Catholic University School of Law in Caracas in 1970. He engaged in post-graduate studies at the International Public Administration Institute of Paris, the International Institute of Human Rights at Strasbourg, and the University of Paris.

== Diplomatic career ==
Alcalay's diplomatic career includes stints at the Venezuelan Embassy in Paris as Third Secretary from 1970 to 1971 and as counselor from 1978 to 1979, and in Venezuela's Permanent Mission to the European Community as Minister Counselor from 1979 to 1983.

He served as Coordinator of Interparliamentary Relations of the Venezuelan Congress (1983–85), Secretary General of the Andean Parliament (1984–85), and Permanent Secretary of the Andean Parliament (Bogotá, 1985–89).

Alcalay was Venezuela's Ambassador to Romania from 1990 to 1992. He served as Venezuela's Ambassador to Israel from 1992 to 1995. He was Venezuela Vice Minister of Foreign Affairs between 1995 and 1996. Alcalay was then Venezuela's Ambassador to Brazil from 1997 to 2000.

In May 2001, Alcalay became Venezuela's Permanent Representative to the United Nations, and presented his credentials to UN Secretary General Kofi Annan. Alcalay was also elected Chairman of the United Nations Committee on Information that month. In 2001 he was the Vice Chairman of the Disarmament and International Security Committee of the UN General Assembly's 56th Session. He resigned as Venezuela's Ambassador to the United Nations in March 2004 to protest Venezuela President Hugo Chávez's policies, saying that the actions of Venezuela's National Electoral Council "rob Venezuelans of the right to effect change through the democratic process", and that Venezuela was being subjected to army and police repression and unacceptable loss of life, and that peaceful protest was no longer possible. Only two days prior to his resignation, he had been appointed Venezuela's Ambassador to London.

== Academia ==
Alcalay has published seven books and a number of articles on human rights, the illicit drug trade, democracy for Latin America, and diplomatic issues, and is a columnist for Diario La Verdad. He speaks seven languages, including French, English, Portuguese, and Italian.
