= Vladimir Villegas =

Venezuelan journalist and politician (born 1961)

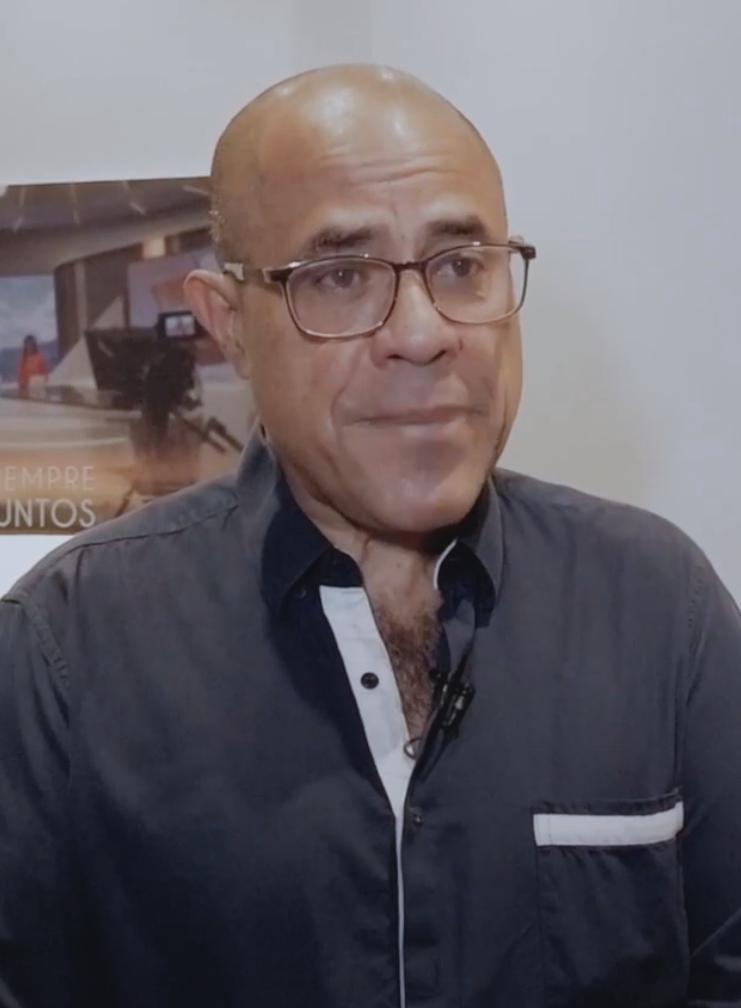

President of Venezolana de Televisión
- In office November 2003 – December 2004

Venezuela Ambassador to Brazil
- In office 2002–?

Venezuela Ambassador to Mexico
- In office May 2005 – November 2005

Personal details
- Born: 11 December 1961 (age 64) Caracas, Venezuela
- Party: Avanzada Progresista
- Education: Central University of Venezuela

Vladimir Villegas Poljak (born 11 December 1961) is a Venezuelan journalist and politician. He was President of Venezolana de Televisión from late 2003 to December 2004. He has written regularly for El Nacional and El Mundo, with a weekly column in El Nacional. He is a founder of the Avanzada Progresista party, having previously been a supporter of Patria Para Todos.

== Early life ==
Villegas is the son of Cruz Villegas, head union communist, confined to the Amazon jungle during the dictatorship of Marcos Pérez Jiménez, and former president of the United Workers of Venezuela (CUTV) and vice president of the World Federation of Trade Unions. His mother, Maja Poljak was a Jewish Communist social activist and photographer born in Zagreb, Croatia, formerly Yugoslavia.

He is the brother of the journalist and politician Ernesto Villegas, Minister of Communication and Information since October 2012.

== Education ==
While attending the Central University of Venezuela, Villegas was a leader of the Communist Party of Venezuela, and he began his journalistic career at the Party's Tribuna Popular. Later he became close to La Causa Radical and took a seat in the Chamber of Deputies.

== Political career ==
In the 1993 Venezuelan general election he was elected to the Chamber of Deputies for La Causa Radical, representing the Venezuelan Federal District, and was re-elected in the 1998 elections.

He was a member of the 1999 Constituent Assembly of Venezuela which drew up the 1999 Constitution of Venezuela. He was the Venezuelan Ambassador to Brazil in 2002, and Ambassador to Mexico from May to November 2005, until the Mexico and Venezuela diplomatic crisis saw him recalled to Caracas. From November 2003 to December 2004 he was the president of the state-run Venezolana de Televisión. In 2006 he was named deputy Foreign Minister for Asia, the Middle East and Oceania; he resigned in 2007 over disagreements regarding the 2007 constitutional referendum.

On 2 May 2013, Villegas was offered the position of being the director of Globovisión beside Leopoldo Castillo. Villegas ultimately declined the position citing "differences" with the newly created board of directors.
