= Nora Uribe =

Venezuelan politician (1938–2026)

Minister of Communication and Information
- In office 2002–2003
- President: Hugo Chávez
- Preceded by: Ismael Hurtado
- Succeeded by: Jesse Chacón

Personal details
- Born: Nora Margarita Uribe Trujillo; 1938
- Died: 7 February 2026 (aged 87–88)
- Party: MVR
- Education: Central University of Venezuela
- Occupation: Activist

Nora Margarita Uribe Trujillo (1938 – 7 February 2026) was a Venezuelan politician of the Fifth Republic Movement (MVR).

== Life and career ==
Uribe served as Minister of Communication and Information from 2002 to 2003 under President Hugo Chávez, with whom she often appeared on the talk show Aló Presidente. She initially sought a seat in the National Assembly, but Chávez dismissed her from her post following a technical error that "ruined" the broadcast of one of his speeches. She also held diplomatic roles, serving as ambassador to El Salvador in 2010, Costa Rica (where she was threatened with kidnapping), and Paraguay.

Uribe died on 7 February 2026.
