= Venezuelan Jews in Israel =

Total population
- 10,000

Regions with significant populations
- Jerusalem, Tel Aviv

Languages
- Hebrew (Main language for all generations); Older generation: Spanish language

Religion
- Judaism

Venezuelan Jews in Israel are Jewish immigrants and descendants of the immigrants of the Venezuelan Jewish communities, who now reside within the state of Israel.

== History ==
Since the establishment of the State of Israel there has been a Venezuelan Jewish migratory flow to Israel although this flow has fluctuated over time. Many Jewish Venezuelans choose Israel as an alternative to settle due to political and economic instability that has rocked Venezuela in recent decades.

According to the Latin American Jewish Congress, Venezuela's Jewish community had an estimated 22,000 people when Chávez took office in 1999. In the early 2000s, emigration of Venezuelan Jews to Israel grew steadily. The Algemeiner Journal stated that this emigration from Venezuela occurred due to "the country’s economic crisis ... as well as the anti-Semitic rhetoric that has marked the left-wing regime’s support for Iran, Syria, and Palestinian Islamist organizations like Hamas" and that "first Chavez and now Maduro have found political uses for anti-Jewish rhetoric".

By 2007, amid concerns of rising allegations of antisemitism, emigration saw Venezuela's 20,000 Jewish population drop by 20% to 45%. For instance The Latin American Jewish Congress estimated that in 2007, only between 12,000 and 13,000 Jews still resided in Venezuela. By November 2010, more than 50% of Jewish Venezuelans had left the country since Chavez came to power, with some of those remaining behind complaining of "official antisemitism". By early 2013, only 9,000 Jews lived in Venezuela and in early 2015, it was reported that under 7,000 lived in the country.

Among destinations for the 15–16,000 Jews leaving Venezuela, the prime destination was the United States, particularly Miami, and the rest went to Israel. With the Crisis in Venezuela in the 2010s, Jewish emigration rapidly increased. This time emigrating Venezuelan Jews primarily went to Israel, as the devaluation of their property and other assets effectively closed off the options such as the United States or Panama.

== See also ==
- History of the Jews in Venezuela
- Aliyah from Latin America in the 2000s
- Jewish ethnic divisions
- Israel–Venezuela relations
