= 2005 Mexico–Venezuela diplomatic crisis =

The 2005 diplomatic crisis between Mexico and Venezuela began after the Fourth Summit of the Americas where Mexican President Vicente Fox made veiled criticisms of anti-Free Trade Area of the Americas leaders.

Following Fox's declarations, on November 10, 2005, Venezuelan President Hugo Chávez stated in a speech to supporters in Caracas that he was saddened that "the president of a people like the Mexicans lets himself become the puppy of the empire" for what he alleged was Fox's obsequience to U.S. trade interests in his promotion of the newly stalled FTAA.

Additionally, on the November 13, 2005 episode of his weekly talk show Aló Presidente, Chávez stated that the Mexican president was "bleeding from his wounds" and warned Fox to not "mess" with him, lest Fox "get stung". Fox, upon hearing of the remarks, expressed his outrage and threatened to recall Mexico's ambassador to Venezuela if the Venezuelan government did not promptly issue an apology. However, rather than apologizing, Chávez simply recalled Venezuela's own ambassador to Mexico City, Vladimir Villegas. The Mexican ambassador to Caracas was recalled the following day. Fox pulled the credentials of the Venezuelan ambassador to make it clear that Villegas was kicked out, not recalled as Venezuela claimed.

Although ties between the two countries have been strained, neither country will say that diplomatic ties have been indefinitely severed. Several groups both in Mexico and Venezuela worked to restore the diplomatic relationship between the two countries. In August 2007 normal relations were re-established with the appointment of former foreign minister Roy Chaderton as Venezuela's envoy in Mexico City and the transfer of Jesús Mario Chacón Carrillo, formerly Mexican ambassador to Colombia, to Caracas.
