= History of the Jews in Venezuela =

The location of Venezuela in South America. (Land controlled by Venezuela shown in dark green; claimed but uncontrolled land shown in light green.)

The history of the Jews in Venezuela dates to the middle of the 17th century, when records suggest that groups of marranos (Spanish and Portuguese descendants of baptized Jews suspected of secret adherence to Judaism) lived in Tucacas, Caracas and Maracaibo. The Jewish community, however, did not become established in Venezuela until the middle of the 19th century. Since Hugo Chávez took power in 1999, tension has existed between the government and Jewish population, which has seen large numbers emigrating. Today, the majority of Venezuelan Jews live in Israel, while modern-day Venezuela continues to host a modest Jewish population.

== 16th century ==
In search of El Dorado in the Eastern Venezuela during 1568 the conqueror Pedro Malaver de Silva recruited about 600 men, many of them with wives and children, who were mostly Jewish converts (being suspected of continuing with their religious practices, they were called Marranos) expelled from various European cities under Spanish rule. Once the levy was concluded, the preparations were completed, two ships were supplied and the people were reunited with their respective families in Seville. On March 19, 1569, they set out to sea in Sanlúcar de Barrameda and sailed to Venezuela. After stopping in the Canary Archipelago they arrived in the Margarita Island. Before leaving Margarita, the Hidalgo brothers and more than 150 of the men he brought abandoned him. The rest of the expeditionaries disembark at the port of Borburata on the mainland. Malaver de Silva began his itinerary with the ascent of the coastal mountain range, camping in the Venezuelan city of Valencia del Rey. Malaver suffered a serious illness that kept him bedridden for a long period, in addition to the rainy season. His nephew Garci González de Silva who with 40 more veterans left Don Pedro in the lurch and departed to the eastern of Venezuela. With only 130 men Malaver advances along the mountain range towards the plains. Soon the expedition began to feel the hardships of that inhospitable and unpopulated area. Although initially the hope of finding great fortunes of El Dorado made the men endure all the hardships, the infinity of the plains ended up discouraging them. Fatigue also affected the temperament of Malaver de Silva, who instead of encouraging his soldiers became increasingly distant and intractable. But the man did not give up and from Barquisimeto he left for Peru. On the way he climbed the Andes mountain range, passed through Santa Fe de Bogotá. Later he went to Chachapoyas in Peru, sold his lands and returned to Spain to request a new capitulation.

== 17th century ==
In 1693 a large group of granas Jews originally from Leghorn left the Dutch colony of Curaçao for Tucacas. With the settlement of Jews there, the place became a lively commercial center. The Jews built houses, grew cattle, erected a fortress, and built a synagogue. They began to purchase cocoa beans and tobacco from the interior of Venezuela, and mule trains carrying cocoa from New Granada and Quito would arrive in Tucacas, sell their produce to the Jews, and purchase textiles and other European goods in return. The attempts by Spanish forces to attack the settlement failed, owing to the protection of Dutch naval units, the local Venezuelan population, and the defense by the Jews themselves. This Dutch enclave was under the command of Jorge Christian, Marquis of Tucacas, and Samuel Gradis Gabai, under the title Señor de Las Tucacas. Samuel was also president of the Hebrew congregation called "Santa Irmandad" (the Holy Brotherhood).

== 18th century ==
The Spanish provincial authorities collaborated with the Jews of Tucacas, since they saw them as an outlet for export and the suppliers of much-needed European goods, since the over-extended Spanish fleet could not meet the demands of all its American colonies. At the end of 1717, the province of Venezuela became part of the viceroyalty of Nueva Granada which also included actual Colombia and Ecuador. The Viceroy Jorge de Villalonga, because of complaints from the Catholic clergy of Inquisition and from Spain Crown, decided to eliminate Tucacas. Pedro Jose de Olivarriaga was nominated commissioner against the so-called Jewish "contraband trade." With special army units and 40 ships he attacked and captured the town in 1720. According to eyewitnesses the synagogue was destroyed, the Jews burned their own houses,and left for Curaçao.

== 19th century ==
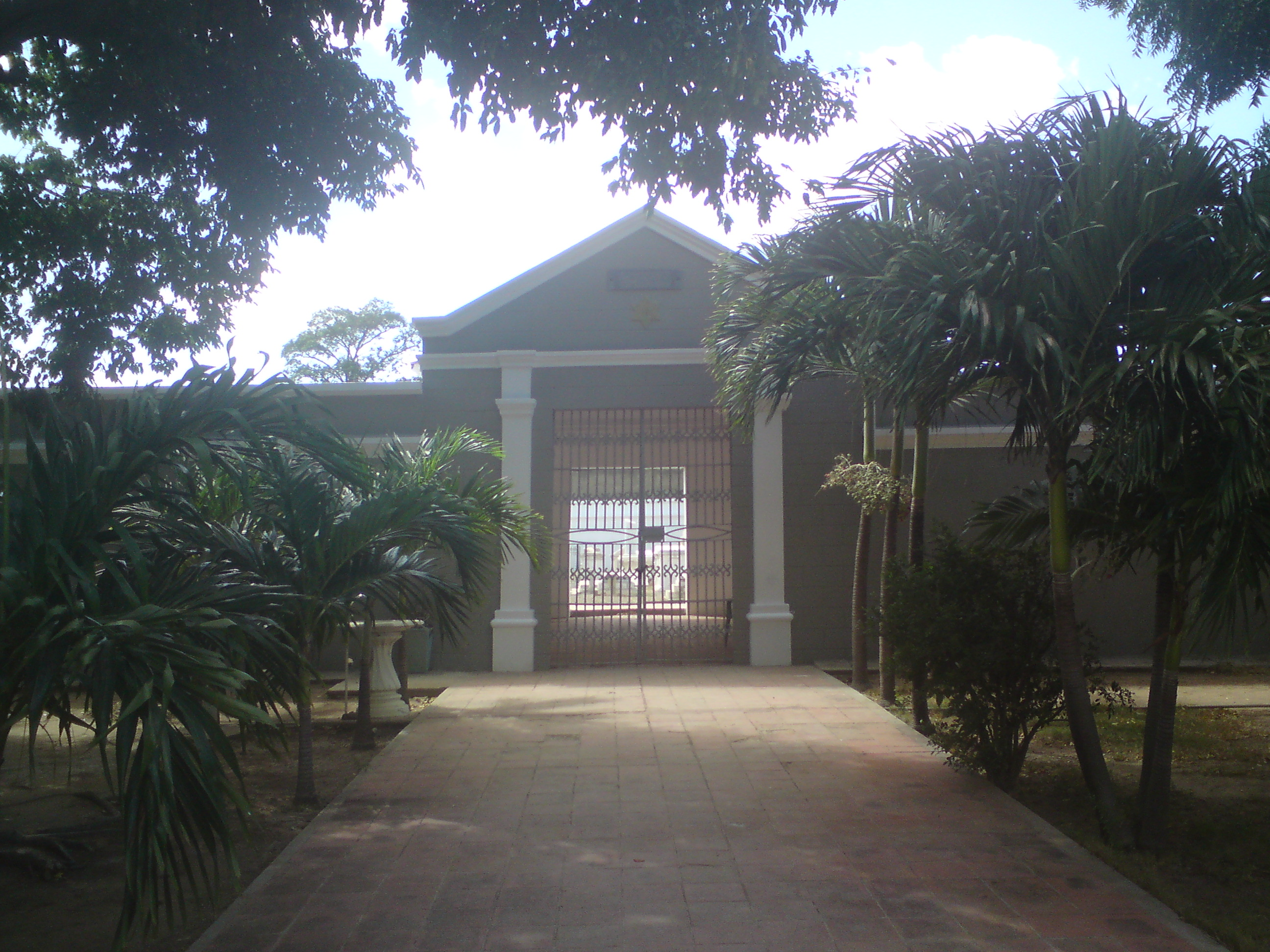
The Jewish Cemetery of Coro, established in 1832, is the oldest Jewish cemetery in continuous use in the Americas.

At the turn of the 19th century, Venezuela were fighting against their Spanish colonizers in wars of independence. In 1812 Simon Bolivar, considered Venezuela’s liberator, found refuge and material support for his army in the homes of Jews from Curaçao at that time a British colony. Jews such as Mordejai Ricardo and brothers Ricardo and Abraham Meza offered hospitality to an exiliated Bolivar as he fought against the Spanish, thus establishing brotherly relations between Jews and the newly independent Venezuelan republic. Several Jews of Curazao even fought in the ranks of Bolivar’s army during the war as admiral Luis Brion commandant of the Cayes naval expedition, David Haim de Moshe Lopez Penha, who served as a colonel of infantry; Benjamin Henriques, who became a captain in the cavalry; and Juan de Sola, who commanded the cavalry at the Battle of Carabobo in 1821 to join his fight for independence of Latin America. The ties between Jews in the Dutch island colonies and Venezuela increased more dramatically between 1819–1821 after its new constitution called for religious freedom. In 1820, the Curiel was the first Jewish family settled in the town of Santa Ana de Coro. The Jewish Cemetery of Coro is the oldest Jewish cemetery in continuous use in the Americas. Its origin can be located in the 19th century, when Sephardic Jews from the Dutch colony of Curaçao began to migrate to the Venezuelan city of Santa Ana de Coro in 1824. Other Jewish communities began springing up in Caracas and Puerto Cabello in the 1840s. In 1844, groups of Jews from Morocco came to the town of Barcelona. Unfortunately, years later in 1854, a violent act of antisemitism meant that the entire Coro Jewish population of 168 individuals was expelled by govern back to Curacao. As they claimed Dutch citizenship, the consul-general for the Netherlands, Van Lansberge, informed the home government in Amsterdam, and three war ships were sent to La Guaira, the principal seaport of Venezuela, and the redress demanded was at once granted. The Venezuelan government agreed to salute the Dutch flag; to restore to the Jews their property in Coro; and to pay an indemnity of 200,000 pesos ($160,000), the last clause being carried into effect in 1859, after lengthy diplomatic negotiations with the ambassador of the Netherlands, Jhr. O. van Rees. Assimilation of Jews in Venezuela was difficult, but in the last decade of the 19th century though small communities could be found in Puerto Cabello, Coro, Caracas, Maracaibo, Villa de Cura, Barcelona, Carupano, Rio Chico, and Barquisimeto.

== 20th century ==
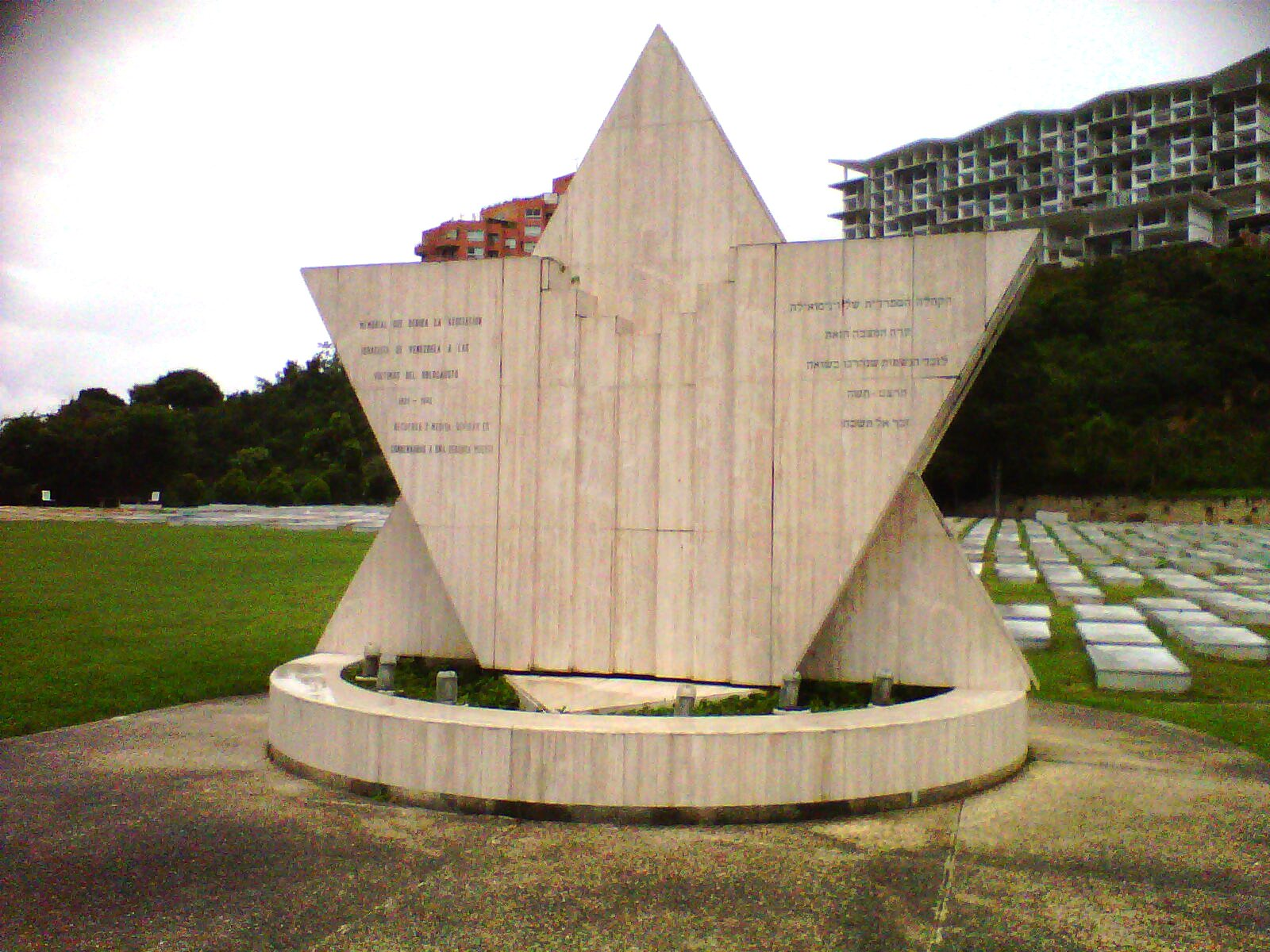
Holocaust Memorial at the Jewish Cemetery in Caracas

On 2 April 1902, in response to rising political tension between the Netherlands and Venezuela to evacuate the Jews of Coro to Curaçao, the HNLMS Koningin Regentes and the HNLMS Utrecht arrived in the Venezuelan port of La Guaira. Prior to their arrival, the Venezuelan Navy had repeatedly checked Dutch and Antillean merchant ships and the presence of the Dutch warships acted as a deterrent against further actions.

Immigration restrictions were placed on Jews in the early 20th century and were abolished in the late 1950s. By 1950 there were around 6,000 Jewish people in Venezuela and the biggest waves of immigration occurred after World War II and the 1967 Six-Day War, The Jewish population in Venezuela was largely centered in Caracas, with smaller concentrations in Maracaibo. Most of Venezuela's Jews are either first or second generation.

In 1907, the Israelite Beneficial Society, which became the Israelite Association of Venezuela in 1919, was created as an organization to bring the Jews who were scattered throughout the country together. Jewish prayer and holiday services took place in small houses in Caracas and towns like Los Teques and La Guaira. By 1917, the number of Jewish citizens rose to 475, and to 882 in 1926. In the 1920s and 1930s, the Jewish community began to develop with the arrival of North African and eastern European Jews. Jewish immigration from Eastern and Central Europe increased after 1934 but, by then, Venezuela had imposed specific restrictions on Jewish immigration, which remained in effect until after the 1950s.

In the turbulent economic and political climate of the 1930s few countries were willing to accept an influx of Jewish migrants. In July 1938 at Evian, 32 nations (included Venezuela) convened to address the Jewish crisis, the US, Britain and France were all reluctant to commit themselves to significant quotas of any sort. Only the Dominican Republic stepped forward and offered a haven to the stateless and persecuted German and Austrian Jews.

In 1939 the steamboats Koenigstein and Caribia left Nazi Germany and docked in Venezuela thanks to good offices of President Eleazar Lopez Contreras. One Jewish refugee commented in the Venezuelan newspaper, La Esfera, "Imagine our joy at being free and far from a land in which everything threatened us with death. It is such a holy occurrence given that we were expelled from Germany and you have embraced us."

The Ambassador Jose Nucete Sardi in his diplomatic work in Europe during and after World War II he was a defender of the rights of the Jewish people and later in promoting the creation of the State of Israel. Nucete Sardi was the first President of the Committee for a Hebrew Palestine in Venezuela, and spearheaded efforts to promote the same across Latin America. In 1947, at the United Nations assembly vote to create the State of Israel, Venezuela’s Ambassador Carlos Eduardo Stolk Mendoza, was accompanied by a High Level Delegation which included former founding members of the above mentioned Venezuelan Committee, such as then Venezuela’s Minister of Foreign Affairs Andres Eloy Blanco and Ambassador Nucete Sardi, then posted in Cuba. By the time, in spite of immigration restrictions, there were around 6,000 Jewish people in Venezuela.

n 1947, the Colegio Moral y Luces, Herzl-Bialik integrated school was established. Student enrollment numbers around 2,000 from kidergarten to high school. Both the Ashkenazi and Sephardi communities take active roles in the institution's affairs, and its reputation for outstanding academic standards has attracted non-Jewish students as well, who comprise around 7-10 percent of the school's student population.I

The biggest waves of immigration occurred after World War II and the 1967 Six-Day War, when a large influx of Sephardi Jews arrived and settled mostly in the capital of Caracas. Coinciding with that very influx, in the mid-60’s the first Chabad representative moved to the country, in order to service the many Jews who had made Venezuela their home. The Jewish population in Venezuela peaked at 45,000, largely centered in Caracas, but with smaller concentrations in Maracaibo. Most of Venezuela's Jews are either first or second generation.

Venezuela was hospitable to Jewish life, and Jews "developed deep ties to the country and a strong sense of patriotism", acculturating and settling into a "comfortable 'live-and-let-live' rapport with the government". According to David Harris, Executive Director of the American Jewish Committee:

They have developed an impressive communal infrastructure built around a central umbrella organization, La Confederación de Asociaciones Israelitas de Venezuela (CAIV), with which the American Jewish Committee signed an association agreement last year, fifteen synagogues (all but one Orthodox), and, perhaps most striking of all, a Jewish all-in-one campus, Hebraica. Combining Jewish nursery and day schools, a country club, cultural center, a verdant setting, and wide-ranging sports activities, Hebraica serves as the focus for much of the community.

The results of these communal efforts speak for themselves. The community is close-knit, an overwhelming majority of Jewish children attend Jewish schools, the level of participation is high, identification with Israel is intense, and intermarriage rates are low compared to the United States or Britain.

What is equally striking in talking with Venezuela's Jews, to the extent that generalizations are ever possible, is an obvious pride in being Venezuelan. Not only do they continue to appreciate the refuge the country provided—the Jews having come in search of safety and opportunity — but they also recognize the country's postwar record of tolerance and relative absence of anti-Semitism, as well as its support of the 1947 UN resolution calling for the establishment of a Jewish state.

== 21st century ==
=== Emigration ===
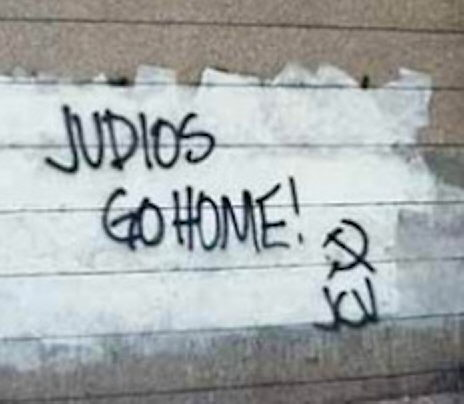
"Judíos (Jews) Go Home" graffiti on the wall of the Israeli Embassy in Caracas.

According to the Latin American Jewish Congress, Venezuela's Jewish community had an estimated 22,000 people when Chávez took office in 1999. In the early 2000s, emigration of Venezuelan Jews to Israel grew steadily. The Algemeiner Journal stated that this emigration from Venezuela occurred due to "the country’s economic crisis ... as well as the anti-Semitic rhetoric that has marked the left-wing regime’s support for Iran, Syria, and Palestinian Islamist organizations like Hamas" and that "first Chavez and now Maduro have found political uses for anti-Jewish rhetoric".

By 2007, amid concerns of rising allegations of antisemitism, emigration saw Venezuela's 20,000 Jewish population drop by 20% to 45%. For instance The Latin American Jewish Congress estimated that in 2007, only between 12,000 and 13,000 Jews still resided in Venezuela. By November 2010, more than 50% of Jewish Venezuelans had left the country since Chavez came to power, with some of those remaining behind complaining of "official antisemitism". By early 2013, only 9,000 Jews lived in Venezuela and in 2020, it was reported that under 6,000 lived in the country.

Among destinations for the 15‍–‍16,000 Jews leaving Venezuela, the prime destination was the United States, particularly Miami. Others went to Israel, as well as to Panama, Colombia, Mexico, Costa Rica, and Guatemala.

With the Venezuelan economic crisis of the 2010s, Jewish emigration rapidly increased. This time they primarily moved to Israel, as the devaluation of their property and other assets effectively closed off other possibilities such as the United States and Panama.

Following the 2026 United States intervention in Venezuela, the small Jewish community faced a new, difficult reality, despite many of them celebrating the fall of President Nicolás Maduro.

Following the 2026 Venezuela earthquakes, interim president Delcy Rodríguez thanked Israel for the specialized aid it provided, which had been arranged through connections with Venezuela's Jewish community.

== Antisemitism ==
Antisemitism has occurred periodically throughout the history of Venezuela, including instances of anti-Jewish rioting in the 19th century and immigration restrictions in the early 20th, leading to a difficult assimilation for Jews in the country.

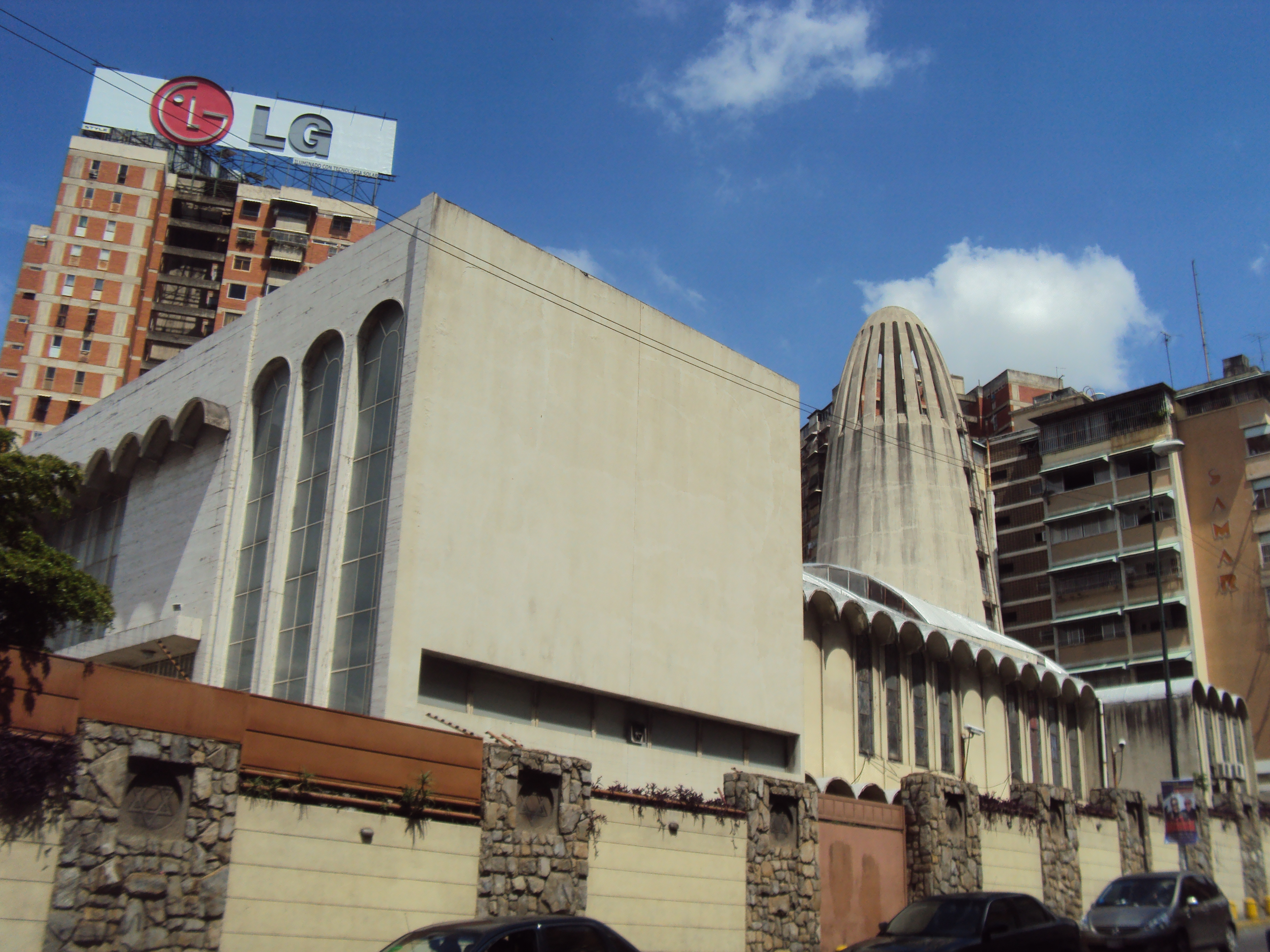
The Tiféret Israel Synagogue in Caracas was attacked in 2009.

Since Hugo Chávez took power in 1999, there have been frequent accusations of antisemitism directed at the government. Members of the World Jewish Congress and Simon Wiesenthal Center have portrayed comments from Chávez as antisemitic, including comparing other politicians to Hitler and the use of the phrase wandering Jews in reference to opposition leaders. The Venezuelan Confederation of Israelite Associations also raised concerns that Chavez's rhetoric, which had "once clearly differentiated criticism of Israel from that of the Venezuelan Jewish community," had merged his anti-Zionist views with anti-Semitic ones beginning in 2004, while The Jewish Telegraphic Agency stated that Chavez's criticism of Israeli military actions during the 2006 Lebanon War was "fanning the flames of anti-Semitism."

Public instances of antisemitism have occurred as well. An armed raid carried out by security forces in November on the Jewish elementary and high school in Caracas was described by the Stephen Roth Institute as "perhaps the most serious incident ever to have taken place in the history of the Jewish community." The Institute also stated that pro-Chavez supporters were responsible for frequent antisemitic incidents such as desecrations of and attacks on synagogues and graffitied slogans such as "Jews go home."

Members of the Jewish community claim that the Maduro regime has continued to engage in antisemitic rhetoric. The US Department of State's 2022 report on International Religious Freedom noted that the community expressed worry about growing antisemitic rhetoric, such as Esteban Trapiello promoting Holocaust denial. Many members of the community believe that officials attempt to mask thinly veiled antisemitism by claiming anti-Zionism.

== See also ==
- Polish Venezuelan; mainly about Polish Jews immigrating to Venezuela
- List of Venezuelan Jews
- Israel–Venezuela relations
- History of the Jews in Curaçao
