= The Commission of Propaganda, Agitation and Communication of the PSUV =

National Commission of Propaganda, Agitation and Communication
- Comisión Nacional de Propaganda, Agitación y Comunicación

Agency overview
- Formed: August 26, 2014
- Headquarters: Caracas, Venezuela
- Agency executive: Ernesto Villegas, Minister of Popular Power for Communication and Information

The National Commission of Propaganda, Agitation and Communication is a Venezuelan propaganda organization belonging to PSUV, the ruling party of the Government of Venezuela.

== History ==
The organization was sworn in by President Nicolás Maduro at the Bolivar Theater in Caracas on 26 August 2014 with a goal to "defend the truth and build socialist consciousness across the country.". The first meeting of the organization took place on 27 August 2014.

== Mission ==
The use of propaganda and agitation by the Commission of Propaganda, Agitation and Communication is used in order to strengthen the Bolivarian Revolution according to one of the Venezuelan government's media organization, Alba Ciudad. Minister of Popular Power for Communication and Information, Ernesto Villegas, stated that the committee wants to continue the work of "Commander Hugo Chávez, the great communicator, agitator and propagandist to remain so for indeed still with us and will remain, his message, his political doctrine is guide and permanent blaze that pushes us to move forward together to conquer this people building the Bolivarian Socialism". Another mission of the organization is "to develop plans and carry out actions to defend the truth and block the war waged against the Bolivarian Revolution".

== Public participation ==
The National Commission of Propaganda, Agitation and Communication encourages people on the street to use their work and place propaganda in public spaces in order to counter "capitalist relations of exploitation and domination". Their website includes stencils for Venezuelans to spray paint propaganda graffiti. Ernesto Villegas said that, "We will go to each brigade, paintings and some elements for propaganda. For that we will we deploy on the street and has murals and presence of the voice of the Bolivarian Revolution telling the truth, carrying the memory, enthusiasm and optimism, additional information is necessary".

== See also ==
- Bolivarian propaganda
