= Jacqueline Faría =

Venezuelan politician

Jacqueline Faría Pineda
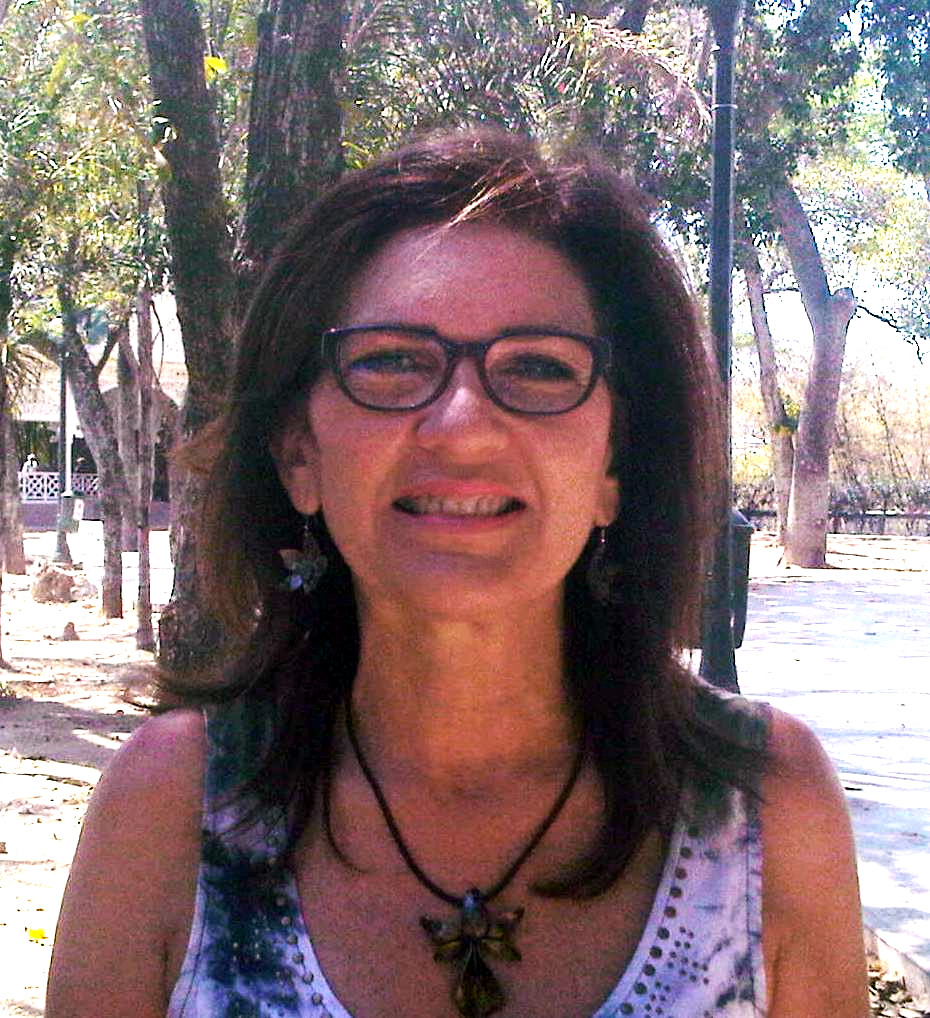
- Faría in 2014

Head of Government of Distrito Capital
- In office 17 August 2020 – 28 January 2021
- President: Nicolás Maduro
- Preceded by: Darío Vivas
- Succeeded by: Nahum Fernández
- In office April 15, 2009 – October 13, 2014
- President: Hugo Chávez
- Preceded by: Position established
- Succeeded by: Ernesto Villegas

Minister of Popular Power for Communication and Information
- In office October 13, 2014 – April 28, 2015
- President: Nicolás Maduro
- Preceded by: Delcy Rodríguez
- Succeeded by: Desirée Santos Amaral

Minister of Environment and Natural Resources
- In office January 2005 – January 2007
- President: Hugo Chávez
- Preceded by: Ana Elisa Osorio
- Succeeded by: Yubirí Ortega

Personal details
- Born: 3 February 1957 (age 69) Caracas, Venezuela
- Party: United Socialist Party of Venezuela (PSUV)

Jacqueline Coromoto Faría Pineda (born 3 February 1957) is a Venezuelan politician. She was the head of the state mobile phone company Movilnet Minister of Environment and Natural Resources (2005–2007), and head of Caracas' water company, Hidrocapital. She is a hydraulic civil engineer by profession.

== Career ==
After the election of Antonio Ledezma as Metropolitan Mayor of Caracas, the Venezuelan National Assembly passed a Capital District Law on April 30, 2009 that transferred most functions, funding, and personnel to the control of Jacqueline Faría, an official directly appointed by Hugo Chávez. A legal challenge was filed and a request was filed with the National Electoral Council to hold a referendum, but these did not stop the transfer. Opponents of Chavez described the move as a deliberate negation of the popular vote, while supporters described the political and budgetary reorganization as an "act of justice" for Libertador Bolivarian Municipality, the largest and poorest of the five municipalities making up Caracas.

In 2009, Faría was also for a time President of the state telephone company CANTV.

After the Mother of All Marches on 19 April 2017, where opposition protesters had to leap into the sewage-filled Guaire River in Caracas in order to flee barrages of tear gas, a Twitter user asked Faría where the $14 billion supposedly invested into the Guaire River went, with the Faría stating "They were completely invested, just ask your people who had a tasteful bath!" As the 2017 Venezuelan protests intensified, demonstrators began using "Puputovs", a play on words of Molotov cocktail, with glass devices filled with excrement being thrown at authorities after Faría mocked protesters who had to crawl through the Guaire River.
