= Aron Mendes Chumaceiro =

Dutch rabbi

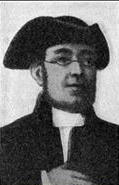
Aron Mendes Chumaceiro

Aron Mendes Chumaceiro (28 January 1810 in Amsterdam – 18 September 1882 in Amsterdam) was chakam (rabbi) of Curaçao, Dutch West Indies. He received the various rabbinical degrees (that of "morenu" in 1846) at the celebrated bet ha-midrash Ets Haim. In 1848 he was awarded the royal gold medal for the best sermon in the Dutch language. When the Sephardic synagogue of Amsterdam proposed to elect him preacher in the vernacular, it met with strenuous opposition, Portuguese being the only language, except Hebrew, used in the synagogue. When in 1852 Chumaceiro was elected first ab bet din, he succeeded in overcoming the opposition to Dutch, and soon established a reputation as one of the foremost pulpit orators in the Netherlands. In 1852 he edited the first Dutch Jewish weekly, Het Israelietisch Weekblad. In the same year he was elected head of the bet ha-midrash Ets Haim.

Delegated by the parnasim (officials of the synagogue) of his congregation in 1854 to receive the future King Pedro V of Portugal, he conducted the royal visitor and his suite to the bet ha-midrash, where the king, noticing the names of the donors to that institution inscribed on the walls, made the significant remark: "parece-me que estou na minha própria terra de Portugal" (It seems as though I were in my own land of Portugal). When Pedro V ascended the throne in 1856, he removed the civil disabilities of the Jews.

On account of his liberal-conservative views Chumaceiro was strongly opposed by the ultra-Orthodox party, and he therefore accepted in 1855 from King William III the appointment of chief rabbi of the colony of Curaçao. At the solicitation of the special ambassador, O. van Rees, who was sent by the king to adjust the claims of the persecuted Dutch Jews of Coro, Venezuela, he succeeded in settling the complicated disputes to the entire satisfaction of the contending parties.

Chumaceiro visited his birthplace in 1861, when the office of chakam was tendered to him, which he declined, receiving on that occasion a costly testimonial from the Sephardic synagogue. He obtained his discharge as chakam of Curaçao in 1869, and received a liberal pension from the king for "the numerous and faithful services rendered to his country."

Chumaceiro had four sons:

1. Abraham Mendes Chumaceiro: Attorney at law; born in Amsterdam on 16 November 1841; died in Curaçao, Dutch West Indies on 19 August 1902. He moved to Curaçao in 1856, studied law, and was admitted to the bar in 1872. He soon acquired great prominence in his profession. Among his literary works are Is Curaçao te Koop? and Het Kiesrecht in de Kolonie Curaçao.
2. Benjamin Mendes Chumaceiro: Cantor; born in Amsterdam in 1871. He received a ministerial training at the bet ha-midrash Ets Haim of Amsterdam. In 1892 he was elected assistant cantor of the Portuguese synagogue at The Hague; and in 1895 cantor of that of Hamburg.
3. Jacob Mendes Chumaceiro: Dayyan and editor; born in Amsterdam on 11 March 1833; died on 8 February 1900. Besides being dayyan of the Sephardic synagogue, and acting chakam for the Portuguese Jews of North and South Netherlands, he was inspector of the Jewish schools of Amsterdam, head and librarian of the bet ha-midrash Ets Haim, and editor of Het Israelietisch Weekblad.
4. Joseph Chayyim Mendes Chumaceiro: Rabbi and editor; born in Amsterdam on 3 July 1844. He studied for the ministry under his father at Curaçao. From 1867 to 1874 he was rabbi of Beth-El congregation, Charleston, South Carolina; from 1874 to 1880, of Nefashot Yehudah, New Orleans, Louisiana; from 1884 to 1887, of Beth-El Emeth, Philadelphia; from 1889 to 1891, of Mikwe Yisrael, Curaçao; from 1892 to 1898, of Children of Israel, Augusta, Georgia; and was recalled as rabbi to Curaçao in 1898. During part (1879–83) of his residence at New Orleans he was also editor of The Jewish South, a weekly journal.

Besides many sermons and discourses, he published The Evidences of Free-Masonry from Ancient Hebrew Records, 1900, which reached a third edition; La Revelacion, the first Jewish catechism in Spanish; and Verdediging is geen Aanval, a correspondence between a Christian divine and a rabbi on Jesus as the Messiah.
