= Norberto Ceresole =

Argentine sociologist and political scientist (1943–2003)

- Born: August 1943; Buenos Aires, Argentina
- Died: May 4, 2003 (aged 59); Buenos Aires, Argentina
- Occupations: Sociologist; political scientist
- Political party: Partido Justicialista

Norberto Rafael Ceresole (August 1943 – May 4, 2003) was an Argentine sociologist and political scientist, who identified himself with Peronism, left-wing militias and the ideas of his friends Robert Faurisson, Roger Garaudy and Ernst Nolte. He was accused throughout his life of being neo-fascist and antisemitic because of his Holocaust denial and hatred of Zionism, Israel and the Jewish community. He was a close confidant of Venezuela president Hugo Chavez.

== Career ==
Ceresole was born in Buenos Aires. He studied in Germany, France and Italy before becoming an advisor from 1969 to 1971 to Juan Velasco Alvarado who came into power through a military coup in Peru in 1968. During the 1970s he was one of the leaders of the far-left guerrilla group ERP in Argentina and was forced into exile after the military coup which removed Isabel Perón from office in March 1976. He then went to Spain where he became a spokesman of Peronism during his exile in Madrid. From then on he became one of the main voices of Peronism in Argentina and an influential voice among some groups of military officers throughout South America. During this time he also publicly defended those who promoted a Latin American alliance with the Soviet Union such as Chilean President Salvador Allende and Manuel Piñeiro, the former head of the Cuban General Intelligence Directorate.

Later Ceresole became a member of the Institute of Latin American Studies of the Russian Academy of Sciences and for over 20 years maintained close connections with the government of Fidel Castro as well as with some representatives of Arab countries. For a time he lived in Spain until the "Semana Santa" military rebellion of 1987 in Argentina against President Raúl Alfonsín, where he became an advisor to the officials led by Aldo Rico. In 1994, after some of the military involved in the rebellion were set free, Ceresole founded with Raúl de Sagastizabal aka ("El Vasco"), a member of the Grupo Albatros, the Centro de Estudios Argentina en el Mundo and started to meet with Mohamed Alí Seineldín, a leader of the Carapintadas. It was through this military group that Ceresole met Hugo Chávez and began to function as an advisor to his cooperators, among them, Colonel Luis Dávila and Manuel Quijada.

=== Venezuela ===
On June 15, 1995, he was detained and deported by Venezuelan intelligence police (DISIP) under President Rafael Caldera because he had in his possession a document titled Proclama à la Nación del Frente Nacional Bolivariano in which the Coup of 1992 was defended as a political option. He was accused of trying to start political links in Venezuela in particular with Hugo Chávez whom he advised from 1994 to 1995.

His reappearance in Venezuela after Chávez was elected in 1998, his close relations with senior members of the government and the publication of a book dedicated to Chávez with the title Caudillo, Ejército, Pueblo: la Venezuela del Comandante Chávez (1999) (published first in Madrid then in Beirut in Arabic and then reprinted in Caracas), created a wave of concern from all sides of Venezuelan society. In 1999 José Vicente Rangel denied any ideological influence on Chávez's administration although in the 1998 book Habla el Comandante Chávez said that he "was reconsidering the ideas of Norberto Ceresole, in his works and studies, where he planned a project of physical integration in Latin America...this will be a project which will integrate the Continent along Venezuela, Brazil and Argentina and their ramifications". At the end of 1999, he was asked by Luis Miquilena, then vice-president, to leave the country. Miquilena later declared that Ceresole left by his own initiative while Ceresole declared that he had been both threatened by Jesús Urdaneta (head of the DISIP) and paid $10,000 by Miquilena to leave.

In 2000, amid accusations of his influence in Venezuelan politics he declared that "I am profoundly proud, for example, that the Venezuelan system of military intelligence was restructured following the strategic guidelines that I proposed at the time". He also proposed in a letter to Jorge Olavarría (later published in the Venezuelan Magazine Primicia) the creation of an Office of Strategic Intelligence that could be financed by Hezbollah like his office in Madrid. However, such an office was never created. In May 2006, President Chávez spoke of his relationship with Ceresole during the broadcast of his weekly program Aló Presidente #255. He remembered him as a "great friend" and as an "intellectual deserving great respect" and recalled a meeting with him in 1995 near the Orinoco river in which they talked about the strategic location of Venezuela and the importance of focusing his future policy on South America instead of North America.

On his return to Argentina following his 1999 departure from Venezuela, Ceresole became an advisor to the Peronist politician Adolfo Rodríguez Saá and, once again, to Aldo Rico, whom he was helping in his campaign to become Governor of Buenos Aires Province. Ceresole died in Buenos Aires a few months later.

== Works ==
Some of his works have been translated into Russian, Arabic and Persian.

- Ejército y política nacionalista (1968)
- Crisis militar Argentina (1986)
- [ed.]. Perú: Sendero Luminoso, ejército y democracia. Madrid, Spain; Buenos-Aires, Argentina: Prensa y Ediciones Iberoamericanas; Instituto Latinoamericano de Cooperación Tecnológica y Relaciones Internacionales (1987)
- Política de producción para la defensa (1988)
- The South Atlantic: War Hypothesis, in Geopolitics of the Southern Cone and Antarctica (1988).
- Tecnología militar y estrategia nacional (1991)
- Materiales sobre economía de la defensa y política de la defensa (Buenos Aires, ILCTRI).
- Terrorismo fundamentalista judío, nuevos escenarios de conflictos (Libertarias, Madrid, 1996)
- El Nacional-judaísmo: un mesianismo post-sionista, con prólogo de Roger Garaudy (Libertarias, Madrid, 1997)
- España y los judíos, Expulsión, Inquisición, Holocausto, 1492-1997 (Amanecer, Madrid, 1997).
- La Falsificación de la Realidad (Libertarias, Madrid-Buenos Aires, 1998)
- La Conquista del Imperio Americano (Al-Andalus, Madrid-Buenos Aires, 1998)
- Caudillo, Ejército, Pueblo: la Venezuela del Comandante Chávez (1999)
- Tres ensayos geopolíticos (2001)
- La cuestión judía en la América del Sur (2003)
