= Radio of the South =

La Radio del Sur

Programming
- Language: Spanish

Ownership
- Owner: SiBCI (Ministry of Popular Power for Communication and Information)

History
- First air date: 2009

The Radio of the South (Spanish: La Radio del Sur) is an international radio network based in Caracas, Venezuela. It was launched in January 2010. The network follows the 2005 launch of TeleSur, the Venezuelan government television propaganda network aimed at Latin America.

== History ==
The network began operations in September 2009 with 88 stations in Latin America, the Caribbean, the United States, Canada and Spain, including 18 stations in Argentina and 10 in Colombia. Whilst initially focussed on countries with Spanish-speaking populations, the network aims eventually to translate programming into French, English, Dutch and Arabic, to provide coverage for Africa.

Initially it was reported that around a third of its content would be produced in Caracas (with the remaining content produced by allied stations in Latin America and Africa).

== Controversy ==
In May 2011 workers at the Radio of the South protested against the dismissal of the network's president, stating that the move did not respect the network's internal participatory process, and was "without any explanation or formality, behaviour that is incoherent with socialist principles". Workers said the dismissal was a reprisal for the network's critical reporting of Venezuela's deportation to Colombia of Joaquin Pérez Becerra, an alternative media activist accused of FARC links. Becerra was a Colombian councillor for the Patriotic Union who was granted asylum in Sweden.
