= Ana Elisa Osorio =

Venezuelan politician

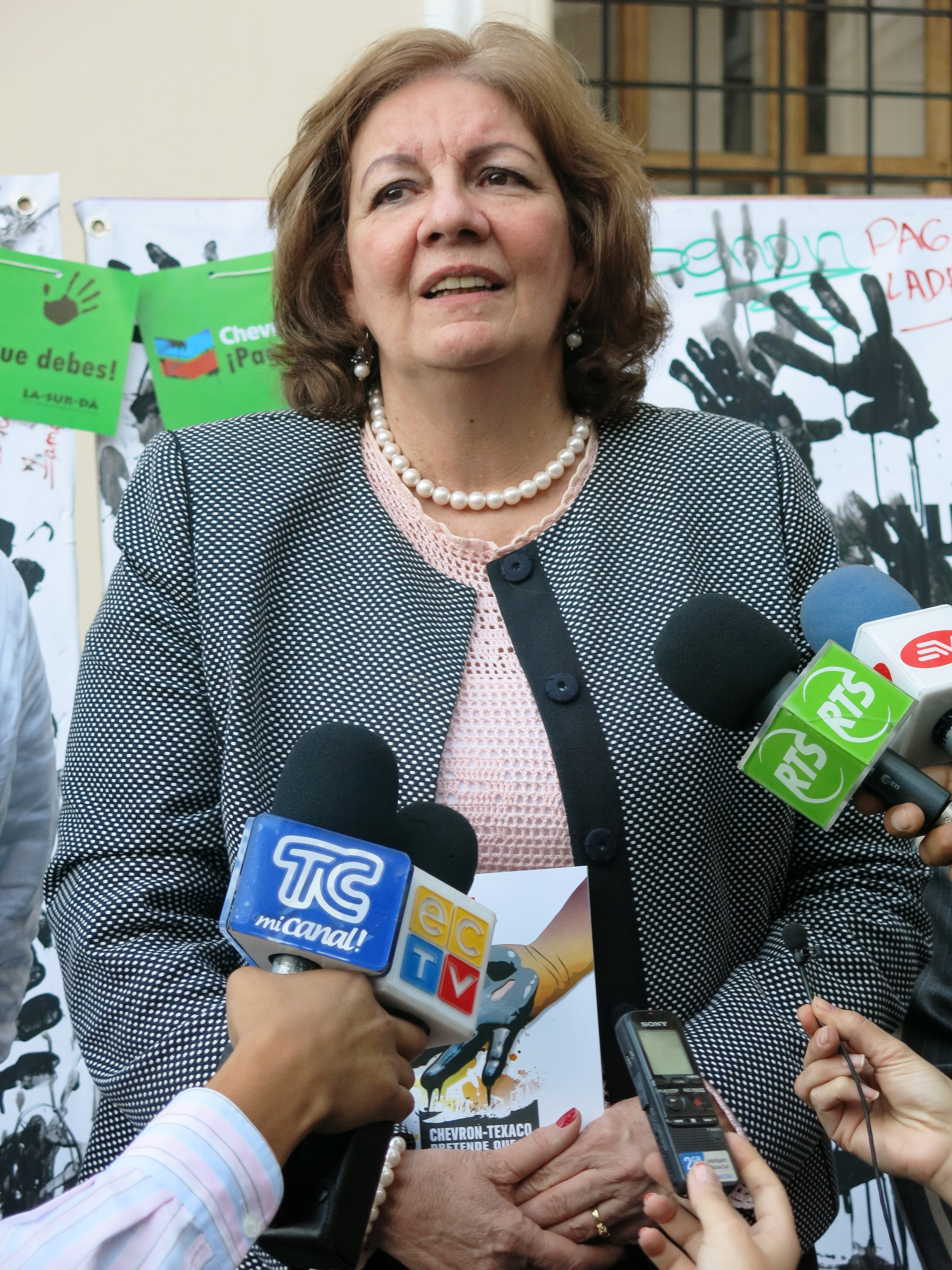

Minister for the Environment and Natural Resources
- In office 2000–2005
- President: Hugo Chávez

Personal details
- Occupation: Politician

Ana Elisa Osorio is a Venezuelan politician who worked in the Ministry of the Environment and Natural Resources of the Hugo Chávez administration. She is now a critic of Nicolás Maduro.

== Career ==
Osorio graduated from Central University of Venezuela, having studied medicine, with a PhD in epidemiology and a Master's degree in planning for development (Business studies). She founded the Institute for Public Health in Bolívar state, where she also served as Director of Health. Between 1999 and 2000 she was the Vice President of Health, and between 2000 and 2005 she was the Minister for the Environment and Natural Resources.

After 2005 she was part of the corporate management of Environment and Occupational Hygiene for PDVSA, where she stayed until 2008. Later this year, she was elected onto the board for the leading party PSUV, until 2009 she held the position of vice president of the party for Amazonas state, and between 2009 and April 2010 she was the technical secretary for the Extraordinary Meetings of PSUV. After 2008 she was also a member of the national directive for the party. Between 2011 and 2013, Osorio was the vice president of the parliamentary group before the Latin American Parliament, and from 2011-2016 was the Vice President of the Venezuelan section of the Latin American Parliament.

== Dissidency ==
The ex-minister became part of the Chavismo-critical group called Marea Socialista, which seeks enhanced socialism and to combat corruption. On 9 September this group published an investigation titled "Sinfonía de un desfalco a la nación: Tocata y fuga... de capitales" (English: "Symphony of an embezzlement from the nation: Cutting and flight of capital"), which was signed by Osorio in name of the members of Marea Socialista. The ex-minister said that "during the entire study period there developed a process of mafia-like accumulation of capital that reached a net flight between 1998 and 2013, of 259,234,000 million; this calculates results, after discounting the movement abroad of gross capital incomes destined for FONDEN, with what we estimate at 110,225,000 million (Figure 4, Gross Capital Flight abroad, estimates of FONDEN, net flight of the entire period, and duration of exchange controls, in millions of dollars)... to illustrate the severity of this, we can equate the cost as the total of 25 World Cups like the one held in Brazil. Or the fall in incomes caused by 10 oil sabotages like the one in 2002/2003."
