= Ministry of Environment and Natural Resources (Venezuela) =

Government ministry of Venezuela

The Ministry of Environment and Natural Resources was a federal-level department that managed environmental reserves, rehabilitation, and natural resources (especially potable water, soil fertility, and the Caribbean coasts) in Venezuela. The last cabinet minister was Miguel Leonardo Rodríguez.

== Ministers ==
Ministros de Venezuela
#	Name	Period	President
1	Arnoldo José Gabaldón Berti	1977 - 1979	Carlos Andrés Pérez
2	Vinicio Carrera	1979 - 1983	Luis Herrera Campins
3	Francisco Lara García	1983 - 1984	Luis Herrera Campins
4	Orlando Castejón	1984	Jaime Lusinchi
5	Juan Francisco Otaola Paván	1984 - 1986	Jaime Lusinchi
6	Guillermo Colmenares Finol	1986 - 1988	Jaime Lusinchi
7	José Arnaldo Puigbó Morales	1988 - 1989	Jaime Lusinchi
8	Enrique Colmenares Finol	1989 - 1993	Carlos Andrés Pérez
9	Adalberto Gabaldón	1993 - 1994	Ramón José Velasquez
10	Roberto Pérez Lecuna	1994 - 1997	Rafael Caldera
11	Rafael Martínez Monró	1997 - 1999	Rafael Caldera
12	Atala Uriana	1999	Hugo Chávez
13	Jesús Pérez	1999 - 2000	Hugo Chávez
14	Ana Elisa Osorio	2000 - 2005	Hugo Chávez
15	Jacqueline Faría	2005 - 2007	Hugo Chávez
16	Yubiri Ortega	2007 - 2010	Hugo Chávez
17	Alejandro Hitcher	2010 - 2012	Hugo Chávez
18	Cristóbal Francisco Ortiz	2012 - 2013	Hugo Chávez
19	Dante Rivas	2013	Nicolás Maduro
20	Miguel Leonardo Rodríguez	2013 - 2014	Nicolás Maduro
21	Guillermo Rafael Barreto Esnal	2015 - 2016	Nicolás Maduro
22	Ernesto Paiva	2016 - 2017	Nicolás Maduro
23	Ramón Celestino Velázquez	2017 - 2018	Nicolás Maduro
24	Heryck Rangel	2018 - 2019	Nicolás Maduro
25	Oswaldo Barbera Gutiérrez	2019 - Actual	Nicolás Maduro

== See also ==
- Cabinet of Hugo Chávez
