= AVN (Albania) =

Albanian television channel

- Country: Albania

History
- Launched: 1995

Availability

Terrestrial
- Analogue: PAL

AVN TV (Albania Video Network) was the first private television station in Albania. It was founded on 20 December 1995 in the city of Fier, with Fatos Mihali as its president. It also provides a local cable television system.

The channel's owner was arrested by the police on 5 September 2018, receiving eight hours of detention and a fine of five million lek.
