= Ernesto Villegas =

Venezuelan journalist, politician, and writer

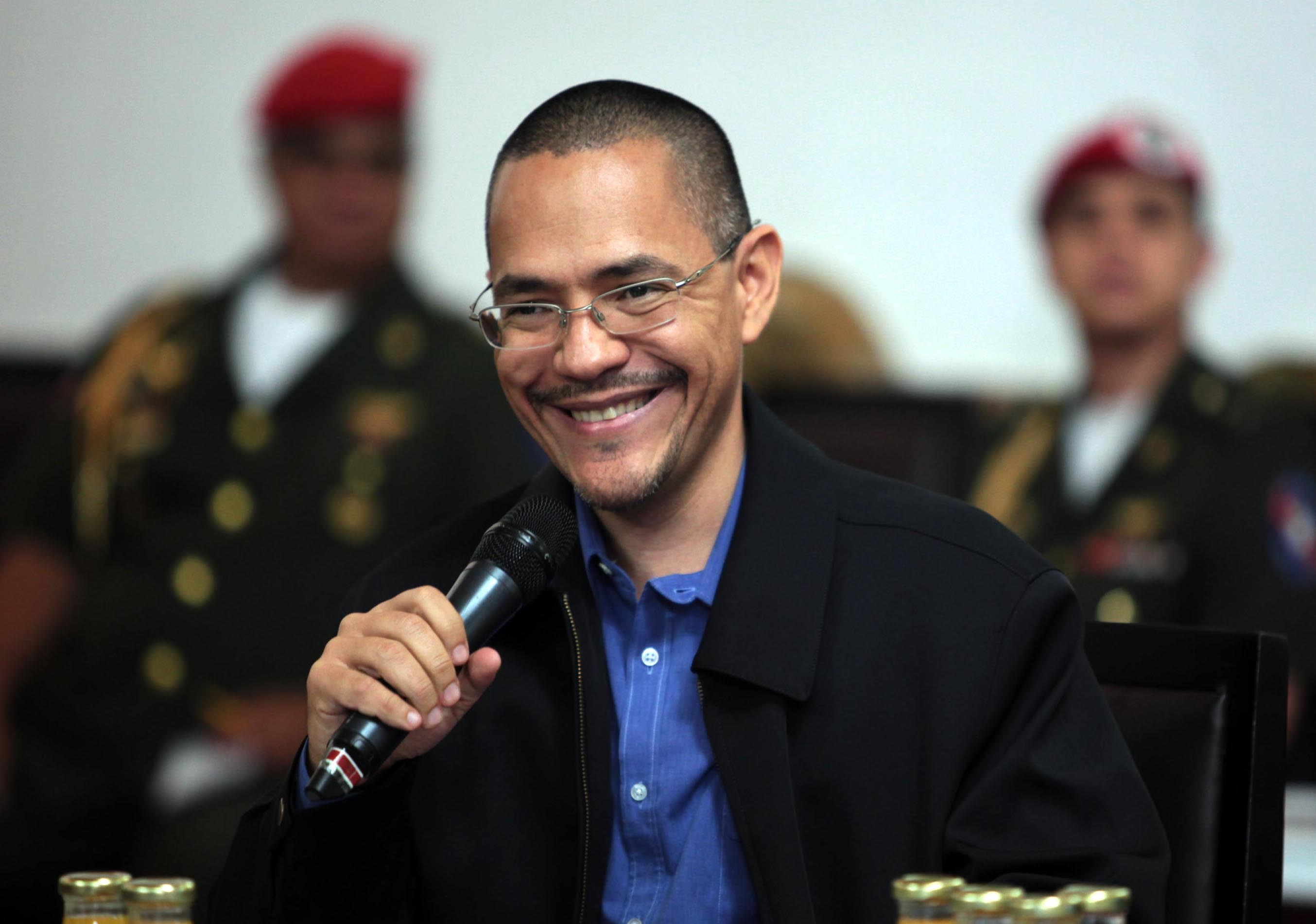

2nd Head of Government of the Venezuelan Capital District
- In office October 13, 2014 – May 26, 2015
- President: Nicolás Maduro
- Preceded by: Jacqueline Faría
- Succeeded by: Juan Carlos Dugarte

Minister of State for the Revolutionary Transformation of Greater Caracas
- In office December 2013 – 2015
- President: Nicolás Maduro
- Preceded by: Francisco de Asís Sesto Novas

Minister of Popular Power for Communication and Information
- In office October 4, 2016 – November 3, 2017
- President: Nicolás Maduro
- Preceded by: Luis José Marcano Salazar
- Succeeded by: Jorge Rodríguez
- In office October 13, 2012 – August 4, 2013
- President: Hugo Chávez (2012–2013); Nicolas Maduro (2013)
- Preceded by: Andrés Izarra
- Succeeded by: Delcy Rodríguez

Personal details
- Born: 29 April 1970 (age 56) Caracas, Venezuela
- Party: United Socialist Party of Venezuela (PSUV)
- Spouse: Klara Aguilar Vásquez
- Education: Central University of Venezuela

Ernesto Emilio Villegas Poljak is a journalist, politician, and writer from Venezuela. He has served as the Minister of Culture.

== Biography ==
Ernesto Villegas was born in Caracas in 1970. He is the youngest of eight children, two of them, Mario and Vladimir, Alice, Clara, Esperanza, Tatiana and Asia.

He is the son of Cruz Villegas, head union communist, confined to the Amazon jungle during the dictatorship of Marcos Pérez Jiménez, and former president of the United Workers of Venezuela (CUTV) and vice president of the World Federation of Trade Unions. His mother, Maja Poljak was Jewish and a Communist social activist and photographer born in Zagreb, Croatia, formerly Yugoslavia.

Villegas graduated as a journalist from Central University of Venezuela. He had worked in media such as newspapers Economía Hoy, El Nuevo País, El Universal and Quinto Día, En Confianza, Despertó Venezuela and Toda Venezuela of Venezolana de Televisión. He was the editor of the newspaper Ciudad Caracas.

He was the Minister of Popular Power for Communication and Information from October 2012 until August 2013. Later, he was appointed as Minister of State for the Revolutionary Transformation of Greater Caracas since December 2013. From October 2014 to May 2015, he was the Head of Government for the Venezuelan Capital District.

== Controversy ==
=== Sanctions ===
In November 2017, Ernesto Villegas was sanctioned by the United States Office of Foreign Assets Control after the 2017 Venezuelan Constituent Assembly election.

On 29 March 2018, Villegas was sanctioned by the Panamanian government for his alleged involvement with "money laundering, financing of terrorism and financing the proliferation of weapons of mass destruction".

== See also ==
- Bolivarian propaganda
- The Commission of Propaganda, Agitation and Communication of the PSUV
