= Radio Nacional de Venezuela =

Government radio station in Venezuela

Coordinates: 10°30′06″N 66°52′03″W

Programming
- Language: Spanish

Ownership
- Owner: Ministry of Popular Power for Communication and Information

History
- First air date: 1936

Links
- Website: www.rnv.gob.ve

Radio Nacional de Venezuela is a government radio station in Venezuela. Broadcasting began in 1936. The station is currently run by the Venezuelan governments Ministry of Popular Power for Communication and Information (MINCI).

For external broadcasting there is a shortwave station south-east of Calabozo replacing a mediumwave station on Paraguaná Peninsula.
