= Ciudad CCS =

Newspaper published in Caracas, Venezuela

- Revolution daily
- Type: Daily newspaper
- Format: Tabloid
- Owner(s): Ministry of Popular Power for Communication and Information
- Founded: 2009
- Language: Spanish
- Headquarters: Caracas, Venezuela
- Circulation: 120,000 (2012)
- Price: free
- Website: www.ciudadccs.info

Ciudad CCS is a newspaper published in Caracas, Venezuela. It was launched on 8 August 2009 by Jorge Rodríguez, mayor of the Libertador Bolivarian Municipality of Caracas for PSUV. It is a free newspaper funded by the municipality.

== See also ==
- List of newspapers in Venezuela
