= YVKE Mundial Radio =

- Venezuela
- Frequencies: 550 AM, 94.5 FM (main station)

Programming
- Language: Spanish

History
- First air date: 1944

Links
- Website: radiomundial.com.ve

YVKE Mundial Radio is a Venezuelan radio network. It is part of the state-controlled Bolivarian Communication and Information System (SiBCI).

== History ==
YVKE Mundial Radio was established as Radio Cultura in 1944. The station then became Radio Mundial in 1970 and adopted its current name in 1974. It is owned by the state through SiBCI and is considered one of the main state-owned radio stations in Venezuela.

== Activities ==
As of 2017, the network broadcast five AM and six FM frequencies from six locations: Caracas, Táchira, Barinas, Margarita Island, Mérida and Valencia. The main frequencies from Caracas are 550 AM and 94.5 FM. Its slogan is "Hand in hand with the People".

YVKE Mundial content often draws from other SiBCI media outlets.

On 18 May 2001, the program "Responda, Mundial pregunta" was suspended with the reason not given; the presenter believed this was due to its revelations about allegedly fraudulent contracts involving Caracas mayor and former Hugo Chávez cabinet minister Alfredo Peña.
