= Correo del Orinoco (2009) =

Venezuelan newspaper

- The artillery of thought.
- Type: State-owned daily newspaper
- Editor: Desirée Santos Amaral
- Founded: 2009
- Language: Spanish and English
- Website: www.correodelorinoco.gob.ve

Correo del Orinoco (the Orinoco Post) is a Venezuelan newspaper launched in 2009 with government backing. It is named for its nineteenth-century predecessor, which under the patronage of Simón Bolívar promoted Venezuelan independence. It uses the slogan "the artillery of thought".

== History ==
The original Correo del Orinoco was published on the Orinoco river, but the modern newspaper is based in Caracas. The newspaper is affiliated to the Ministry of Popular Power for Communication and Information and the United Socialist Party of Venezuela.

In 2010 the Correo del Orinoco launched a weekly English-language edition, Correo del Orinoco International, with Eva Golinger as its editor.

On 12 January 2016, Desirée Santos Amaral, a former Minister of Communication and Information, became the new editor of Correo del Orinoco. The previous editor was Vanessa Davies, a journalist and a political activist for the United Socialist Party of Venezuela.

== See also ==
- List of newspapers in Venezuela
