= Agencia Venezolana de Noticias =

National news agency of Venezuela

- Formerly: Agencia Bolivariana de Noticias
- Company type: State-owned news agency
- Predecessor: Venpres (founded 1977)
- Founded: April 2005
- Headquarters: Caracas, Venezuela
- Website: avn.info.ve

Agencia Venezolana de Noticias (AVN) is the national news agency of Venezuela. It is part of the Ministry of Popular Power for Communication and Information (MINCI), but is run as an autonomous service. It reports on national and regional issues, as well as on Latin America in general.

== History ==
AVN was re-founded in 2005 by the Ministry of Communication and Information (MCI) as the Agencia Bolivariana de Noticias (ABN).

In October 2008, Venezuelan minister Andrés Izarra declared in an interview at Radio Nacional de Venezuela that the ABN would be converted into a state owned corporation under the name Agencia Venezolana de Noticias. On 20 June 2010, ABN renaming was formally announced as AVN.

== See also ==
- List of newspapers in Venezuela
