= Antisemitism by country =

This is a partial list of reported antisemitism, organized by country.

== Africa ==
=== Algeria ===
Upon independence in 1962 only Muslims were permitted Algerian citizenship, and 95% of Algeria's 140,000 Jewish population left. Since 1870 (briefly revoked by Vichy France in 1940), most Jews in Algeria had French citizenship, and they mainly went to France, with some going to Israel.

By 1969, fewer than 1,000 Jews were still living in Algeria. By 1975 the government had seized all but one of the country's synagogues and converted them to mosques or libraries.

=== Cameroon ===
In February 2019, deputy justice minister Jean de Dieu Momo advanced an antisemitic canard during prime time on Cameroon Radio Television, and suggested that Jewish people had brought the Holocaust upon themselves.

=== Egypt ===
Professor Peter Schafer of the Freie University of Berlin has argued that antisemitism was first spread by "the Greek retelling of ancient Egyptian prejudices". In view of the anti-Jewish writings of the Egyptian priest Manetho, Schafer suggests that antisemitism may have emerged "in Egypt alone". According to the 1st-century Jewish historian Flavius Josephus, Manetho, a Hellenistic Egyptian 3rd century BCE chronicler and priest, alleges in his books on Egyptian history that Moses was not a Jew, but an Egyptian renegade priest called Osarseph, and portrays the Exodus as the expulsion of a leper colony. Josephus argues that Manetho's claims are inconsistent.

In 629 the Roman emperor Heraclius I. had driven the Jews from Jerusalem. This was followed by a massacre of Jews throughout the empire—in Egypt, aided by the Copts, who had old scores to settle with the Jews, dating from the Persian conquest of Alexandria at the time of Byzantine Emperor Anastasius I (502) and of the Persian general Shahin (617), when the Jews assisted the conquerors in fighting against the Christians.

The mad caliph Al-Ḥakim (996–1020) vigorously applied the Pact of Omar, and compelled the Jews to wear bells and to carry in public the wooden image of a calf. A street in the city, Al-Jaudariyyah, was inhabited by Jews. Al-Ḥakim, hearing that they were accustomed to mock him in verses, had the whole quarter burned down.

Under the Bahri dynasty (1250–1390), one of the Mamluk dynasties, the Jews led a comparatively quiet existence; though they had at times to contribute heavily toward the maintenance of the vast military equipment, and were harassed by the cadis and ulemas of these strict Muslims. Al-Maqrizi relates that the first great Mameluke, Sultan Baibars (Al-Malik al-Thahir (1260–77), doubled the tribute paid by the "ahl al-dhimmah." At one time he had resolved to burn all the Jews, a ditch having been dug for that purpose; but at the last moment he repented, and instead exacted a heavy tribute, during the collection of which many perished.

In 1324 the Jews were accused of arson at Fostat and Cairo; they had to exculpate themselves by a payment of 50,000 gold pieces. Under the Burji Mamelukes the Franks again attacked Alexandria (1416), and the laws against the Jews were once more strictly enforced by Sheik al-Mu'ayyid (1412–21); by Ashraf Bars Bey (1422–38), because of a plague which decimated the population in 1438; by Al-Ẓahir Jaḳmaḳ (1438–53); and by Ḳa'iṭ-Bey (1468–95). The lastnamed is referred to by Obadiah of Bertinoro. The Jews of Cairo were compelled to pay 75,000 gold pieces.

In 1948, approximately 75,000 Jews lived in Egypt. About 100 remain today, mostly in Cairo. In 1948, Jewish neighborhoods in Cairo suffered bomb attacks that killed at least 70 Jews. Hundreds of Jews were arrested and had their property confiscated. The 1954 Lavon Affair, in which Israelis and Egyptian Jews were arrested for bombing Egyptian and American targets served as a pretext for further persecution of the remaining Jewish community in Egypt. After the 1956 Suez Crisis, Egypt expelled over 25,000 Jews, confiscated their property, and about 3,000 were imprisoned. About 1,000 more were imprisoned or detained. In 1967, Jews were detained and tortured, and Jewish homes were confiscated as emigration continued. Egypt was once home of one of the most dynamic Jewish communities in their diaspora. Caliphs in the ninth-eleventh centuries CE exercised various repressive policies, culminating in the destruction and mass murder of the Jewish quarter in Cairo in 1012. Conditions varied between then and the advent of the Ottoman Empire in 1517, when they deteriorated again. There were at least six blood libel persecutions in cities between 1870 and 1892.

In more recent times, the fraudulent Protocols of the Elders of Zion have been published and promoted as though they were authentic historical records, fueling antisemitic sentiments in Egyptian public opinion.

Henry Ford's antisemitic treatise The International Jew has recently been published in Egypt, with distinctly antisemitic imagery on the cover.

=== Libya ===
The area now known as Libya was the home of one of the oldest Jewish communities in the world, dating back to at least 300 BCE.

In 1911 Libya became an Italian colony. In the late 1930s, the pro-Nazi Fascist Italian regime began passing antisemitic laws. As a result of these laws, Jews were fired from government jobs, some were dismissed from government schools, and their citizenship papers were stamped with the words "Jewish race." Despite this repression, 25% of the population of Tripoli was still Jewish in 1941 and 44 synagogues were maintained in the city. In 1942, German troops fighting the Allies in North Africa occupied the Jewish quarter of Benghazi, plundering shops and deporting more than 2,000 Jews across the desert. Sent to work in labor camps, more than 20% of this group of Jews perished.

In 1948, about 38,000 Jews lived in Libya.

A series of pogroms started in November 1945, when more than 140 Jews were killed in Tripoli and most synagogues in the city looted. The pogroms continued in June 1948, when 15 Jews were killed and 280 Jewish homes destroyed.

Upon Libya's independence in 1951, most of the Jewish community emigrated. After the Suez Crisis in 1956, another series of pogroms forced all but about 100 Jews to flee. When Muammar al-Gaddafi came to power in 1969, all remaining Jewish property was confiscated and all debts to Jews cancelled.

Although the main synagogue in Tripoli was renovated in 1999, it has not reopened for services. The last Jew in Libya, Esmeralda Meghnagi died in February 2002. Israel is home to about 40,000 Jews of Libyan descent, who maintain unique traditions.

=== Morocco ===
Jewish communities have existed in what is now Morocco for at least 2,000 years, with the territory's oldest Jewish settlements in the Sous and Draa valleys.

Under Islamic rule, Jews and Christians had the legal-religious status of ahl adh-dhimma (أهل الذمة 'people of the covenant') or mu‘āhidūn (معاهدون 'contractual partners'). From the 15th century in Fes, from the 16th century in Marrakesh, and from the 19th century in other cities, Jews resided in a mallāḥ, a walled and fortified Jewish quarter usually situated near the qaṣba (citadel), the royal palace, or the residence of the governor, where the ruler could ensure their protection and where Jews with senior administrative positions were nearby. There was also the rural mallāḥ, a relatively isolated open village inhabited exclusively by Jews, found especially in the mountainous regions of the Atlas and the Rif and in the plains regions reaching to the Sahara.

The Jewish community in Fes suffered when the city went through conquest and occupation or political turmoil, as in the 1033 Fez massacre at the hands of the Banu Ifran under Temim ibn Ziri (in which they killed 6,000 Jews, according to David Corcos in 1976), the insurrection against the Marinid Sultan Abd al-Haqq II in the 1465 Moroccan revolution, and in the mid-17the century at the hands of the Zawiya Dila'iya under Mohammed al-Hajj ibn Mohammed al-Dila'i, remembered in one contemporary Jewish chronicle as the "sodomite of the zawiya."

Jews in Marrakesh had similar difficulties under the Almohads in 1147. According to Emily Gottreich, the Almohad period is the "first recorded instance of serious persecution of Jews in Morocco." Almohad doctrine was intolerant even of Muslims who didn't accept Ibn Tumart as a mahdi or messianic figure, and Abd al-Mu'min notoriously ordered that Christians and Jews choose between conversion or death.

A number of Jews, fleeing the expulsion from Spain and Portugal, settled in Morocco in the 15th century and afterwards, many moving on to the Ottoman Empire.

In 1875, 20 Jews were killed by a mob in Demnat, Morocco; elsewhere in Morocco, Jews were attacked and killed in the streets in broad daylight.

The imposition of a French protectorate in 1912 alleviated much of the discrimination.

The Shoah in French Morocco. While the pro-Nazi Vichy regime during World War II passed discriminatory laws against Jews, King Muhammad prevented deportation of Jews to death camps (although Jews with French, as opposed to Moroccan, citizenship, being directly subject to Vichy law, were still deported.)

In 1948, approximately 265,000 Jews lived in Morocco. Between 5,000 and 8,000 live there now, mostly in Casablanca, but also in Fez and other cities.

In June 1948, soon after Israel was established and in the midst of the first Arab-Israeli war, riots against Jews broke out in Oujda and Djerada, killing 44 Jews. In 1948–9, 18,000 Jews left the country for Israel. After this, Jewish emigration continued (to Israel and elsewhere), but slowed to a few thousand a year. Through the early fifties, Zionist organizations encouraged emigration, particularly in the poorer south of the country, seeing Moroccan Jews as valuable contributors to the Jewish State:

...These Jews constitute the best and most suitable human element for settlement in Israel's absorption centers. There were many positive aspects which I found among them: first and foremost, they all know (their agricultural) tasks, and their transfer to agricultural work in Israel will not involve physical and mental difficulties. They are satisfied with few (material needs), which will enable them to confront their early economic problems.

— Yehuda Grinker (an organizer of Jewish emigration from the Atlas), The Emigration of Atlas Jews to Israel, Tel Aviv, The Association of Moroccan Immigrants in Israel, 1973

In 1955, Morocco attained independence. Jews occupied several political positions, including three Members of Parliament and a Minister of Posts and Telegraphs. However, emigration to Israel jumped from 8,171 in 1954 to 24,994 in 1955, increasing further in 1956. Beginning in 1956, emigration to Israel was prohibited until 1963, when it resumed. In 1961, the government informally relaxed the laws on emigration to Israel; over the three following years, more than 80,000 Moroccan Jews emigrated there. By 1967, only 60,000 Jews remained in Morocco.

The Six-Day War in 1967 led to increased Arab-Jewish tensions worldwide, including Morocco. By 1971, the Jewish population was down to 35,000; however, most of this wave of emigration went to Europe and North America rather than Israel.

Despite their current small numbers, Jews continue to play a notable role in Morocco; the king retains a Jewish senior adviser, André Azoulay, and Jewish schools and synagogues receive government subsidies. However, Jewish targets have sometimes been attacked (notably in Al-Qaeda's bombing of a Jewish community center in Casablanca, see Casablanca Attacks), and there is sporadic antisemitic rhetoric from radical Islamist groups. Late King Hassan II's invitations for Jews to return have not been taken up by the people who emigrated.

=== South Africa ===
While South Africa is better known for the apartheid system of racial discrimination against blacks, antisemitism has been a feature of that country's history since Europeans first set foot on the Cape Peninsula. From 1652 to 1795 – a period of time which was twice as long as the 20th-century rule of the National Party – Jews were not allowed to settle on the Cape. Subsequent Cape administrations – Batavian and British – were more progressive. An 1868 Act would sanction religious discrimination.

Although antisemitism did not disappear in the 19th century, it would not reach its apotheosis until the years which lead up to World War II. Inspired by the rise of National Socialism in Germany, the Ossewabrandwag (OB) – whose membership accounted for almost 25% of the 1940 Afrikaner population – and the National Party's New Order faction championed a more programmatic solution to the 'Jewish problem'. The Simon Wiesenthal Center reports that these two groups advocated three mechanisms: Jews who had entered the country after 1933 would be repatriated; Jews who had arrived prior to 1933 would be regarded as foreign nationals; lastly, a system of regulations which would limit the number of Jews who would be allowed to own businesses and practice professions would be instituted. The same report lists some of the reasons which South African gentiles gave for disliking Jews: too many of them were involved in commerce and the professions; they practiced profiteering; they committed black market offences; they were loud and ostentatious; they stayed apart and they were different as a result; they bought up the land; and most communists were Jews.

=== Tunisia ===
Jews have lived in Tunisia for at least 2,300 years. In the 13th century, Jews were expelled from their homes in Kairouan and were ultimately restricted to ghettos, known as hara. Forced to wear distinctive clothing, several Jews earned high positions in the Tunisian government. Several prominent international traders were Tunisian Jews. From 1855 to 1864, Muhammad Bey relaxed dhimmi laws, but reinstated them in the face of anti-Jewish riots that continued at least until 1869.

During the Second World War, the Shoah reached French Tunisia. Tunisia, under direct Nazi control during World War II, was also the site of racist antisemitic measures activities such as the yellow star, prison camps, deportations, and other persecution.

In 1948, approximately 105,000 Jews lived in Tunisia. About 1,500 remain today, mostly in Djerba, Tunis, and Zarzis. Following Tunisia's independence from France in 1956, several anti-Jewish policies led to emigration, of which half went to Israel and the other half to France. After attacks in 1967, Jewish emigration to both Israel and France accelerated. There were also attacks in 1982, 1985, and most recently in 2002 when a bomb in Djerba took 21 lives (most of them German tourists) near the local synagogue, in a terrorist attack claimed by Al-Qaeda.

== Asia ==
=== Bahrain ===
Bahrain's tiny Jewish community, mostly the descendants of immigrants who entered the country in the early 1900s from Iraq, numbered about 1,500 in 1948. The Manama riots against the Bahraini Jewish community broke out in December 1947 in the wake of ongoing violence in Palestine. A mob looted Jewish homes and shops, destroyed the city's synagogue, physically assaulted Jews, and murdered an elderly Jewish woman. Further attacks took place following the Six-Day War in 1967. Most Jews left for other countries, especially Israel and the United Kingdom, with some 36 remaining as of 2006.

Today, relations between Jews and Muslims are generally considered good, with Bahrain being the only state on the Arabian Peninsula where there is a specific Jewish community and was only Gulf state with a synagogue until 2023 when the Moses Ben Maimon Synagogue opened in the United Arab Emirates. Jews in Bahrain, despite their low number, play a prominent role in civil society. For example, Ebrahim Daoud Nonoo was appointed in 2002 a member of Bahrain's upper house of parliament, the Consultative Council, while Houda Nonoo has headed the human rights group, Bahrain Human Rights Watch Society since 2004, and was appointed to the Consultative Council in 2005. She was Bahrain's ambassador to the United States from 2008 to 2013.

=== China ===
Antisemitism in the People's Republic of China is mostly a 21st-century phenomenon. There is little evidence of antisemitism in China in historical sources. During the Reform and Opening Up period, academics noted that the spread of philosemitism, which depicts Jews as naturally intelligent and financially savvy, gained traction in the popular press. In the 2020s, antisemitic conspiracy theories began to spread and intensify in China. While there is not a large Jewish diaspora in China, much of the antisemitism is claimed by some to come from Chinese nationalists and anti-Israel leftists, as part of a reaction against supposed foreign encirclement and influence, although the link between anti-Israel sentiment and antisemitism is debated. Some Chinese people believe in antisemitic tropes that Jews secretly rule the world.

=== India ===
India is home to several communities of Jews. Over the course of the twentieth century, several important Hindu leaders, scholars and politicians, such as Veer Savarkar, Sita Ram Goel, Arun Shourie and others have vocally condemned antisemitism and they have also expressed their support for Israel and the Jewish people's right to self-determination.

Of the few antisemitic incidents that were reported, most of them were related to antisemitism which was imported by Portuguese Catholic colonists and missionaries during the 16th century. In India, Christian antisemitism was practiced by the Goa Inquisition, resulting in the expulsion of the Jews from Goa, and the persecution of South Indian Jews by the Portuguese in Kerala. Many European Jews who were known as Paradesi Jews were given shelter during the era of the Portuguese inquisition in Kerala.

There remain several synagogues in India, some occasionally hold services, whilst others are protected as heritage sites.

=== Iran ===
The Islamic Republic of Iran has long employed antisemitic discourse at the highest levels of its political and ideological apparatus. According to scholar Meir Litvak, although Iranian officials and apologists have frequently claimed a separation between Judaism and Zionism, their rhetoric often targets Jews as a collective. Iranian state media and affiliated institutions have regularly disseminated narratives that demonize Jews, with Holocaust denial serving as a prominent expression of this antisemitic ideology and as a rhetorical device to undermine the legitimacy of Israel.

The Islamic Republic's founder and first supreme leader, Ayatollah Ruhollah Khomeini, described Jews as "burdened with the wrath of God" and condemned to "eternal humiliation" for their "evil deeds." Ali Khamenei, Iran's second supreme leader, has repeatedly doubted the validity of the reported casualties of the Holocaust. In one meeting he claimed that the Zionists have had "close relations" with the Nazi leaders and that "providing exaggerated statistics [of the Holocaust] has been a method to justify the Zionists' cruel treatment of the Palestinians".

The Principalists is dominant conservative political faction in Iran, have been characterized by scholars as promoting antisemitic ideologies under the guise of anti-Zionism. While officially distinguishing between Judaism and the "Zionist regime", the faction has frequently utilized classical antisemitic tropes and Holocaust denial as tools of statecraft.

Mahmoud Ahmadinejad, president of Iran between 2005 and 2013, has frequently been accused of denying the Holocaust. During his tenure as president, the regime hosted a 2006 conference titled "Review of the Holocaust: Global Vision," claiming to foster open academic debate. However, the presence of well-known Holocaust deniers like David Duke and Robert Faurisson exposed its actual purpose. In 2012, Ahmadinejad said that a "Zionist clan" had been controlling world affairs for 400 years (though modern Zionism was founded in the late 19th century). At a 2012 UN-backed anti-drug conference in Tehran, Iranian Vice President Mohammad-Reza Rahimi blamed the Talmud for the global drug trade and stated that Zionists control it, citing the absence of "addicted Zionists" as proof. He also accused Zionists of ordering gynecologists to kill Black babies and claimed Jews started the Russian Revolution, while asserting none died in it.

Prominent religious figures, like Ayatollah Ahmad Khatami and Grand Ayatollah Hossein Noori Hamedani, have linked "Zionists" to crimes dating back to the 7th century, praising the mass killing of Jews in Medina labeled "the center of Zionists." Holocaust inversion also features prominently: Dr. Hasan 'Abbasi reimagined the Purim story as a massacre of over 70,000 Persians by Jews, branding it an "Iranian Holocaust." This narrative has been amplified by semi-official websites and state historians. Antisemitic tropes such as the Protocols of the Elders of Zion, blood libel myths, and claims of Jewish control over the global drug trade, finance, and political power have appeared in Iranian media, state-run academic institutions, and even international forums.

In July 2012, the winner of Iran's first annual International Wall Street Downfall Cartoon Festival, jointly sponsored by the semi-state-run Iranian media outlet Fars News, was an antisemitic cartoon depicting Jews praying before the New York Stock Exchange, which is made to look like the Western Wall. Other cartoons in the contest were antisemitic as well. The national director of the Anti-Defamation League, Abraham Foxman, condemned the cartoon, stating that "Here's the anti-Semitic notion of Jews and their love for money, the canard that Jews 'control' Wall Street, and a cynical perversion of the Western Wall, the holiest site in Judaism," and "Once again Iran takes the prize for promoting antisemitism."

ADL/Global 100 reported in 2014 that 56% of Iranians hold antisemitic beliefs, and 18% of them agreed that Jews probably talk too much about the Holocaust. However, the reported results (56%) were reported to be the lowest in the Middle East.

Iranian Jews along with Christians and Zoroastrians are protected under the Constitution and have seats reserved for them in the Iranian Parliament, However, de facto harassment still occurs. A 2021 report by ADL found antisemitism in Iranian textbooks, including characterizing Jews as the "enemies of Islam", inciting non-Jews to "annihilate Muslims", as stirring up "resentment and enmity among Muslims", as well as calling for Israel to be "wiped out."

=== Iraq ===
During Sassanid rule of Assyria (Assuristan) (225 to 634) Assyrian were both victims of occasional persecution, especially under Sassanian high-priest Kartir. After the conquests of the 630s, Islam's first law which discriminated against Jews, Assyrian Christians, Mandeans and Zoroastrians, the poll-tax ("jizyah"), the tax upon real estate ("kharaj") was imposed.

The Umayyad Caliph, Umar II. (717–720), persecuted the Jews. He issued orders to his governors: "Tear down no church, synagogue, or fire-temple; but permit no new ones to be built". It is said that the law requiring Jews to wear a yellow badge upon their clothing originated with Harun.

In 1828, a massacre of Jews was committed in Baghdad.

In 1948, there were approximately 150,000 Jews in Iraq. In 2003, there were 100 left.

In 1941, following Rashid Ali's pro-Axis coup, riots which are known as the Farhud broke out in Baghdad in which approximately 200 Jews were murdered (some sources put the number higher), and up to 2,000 injured.

Like most Arab League states, Iraq forbade the emigration of its Jews for a few years after the 1948 war on the grounds that allowing them to go to Israel would strengthen that state. However, intense diplomatic pressure brought about a change of mind. At the same time, intensifying governmental oppression of the Jews which was fueled by anti-Israeli sentiment, together with public expressions of antisemitism, created an atmosphere of fear and uncertainty.

In March 1950, Iraq passed a law of one-year duration which allowed Jews to emigrate on the condition that they relinquish their Iraqi citizenship. Iraq apparently believed that it would rid itself of those Jews who it regarded as the most troublesome, especially the Zionists, but it retained the wealthy minority of Jews who played an important part in the Iraqi economy. Israel mounted an operation which it codenamed "Ezra and Nehemiah" in an attempt to bring as many of the Iraqi Jews as possible to Israel, and it also sent agents to Iraq in an attempt to urge the Jews to register for immigration as soon as possible.

The initial rate of registration accelerated after a bomb injured three Jews at a café. Two months before the expiration of the law, by which time about 85,000 Jews had registered, a bomb at the Masuda Shemtov Synagogue killed three or five Jews and it also injured many others. The law expired in March 1951, but later, after the Iraqi government froze the assets of departing Jews (including those Jews who had already left), the duration of it was extended. During the next few months, all but a few thousand of the remaining Jews registered for emigration, spurred on by a sequence of bombings that caused few casualties but had great psychological impact. In total, about 120,000 Jews left Iraq.

In May and June 1951, the arms caches of the Zionist underground in Iraq, which had been supplied from Palestine/Israel since the Farhud of 1941, were discovered. Many Jews were arrested and two Zionist activists, Yusuf Basri and Ibrahim Salih, were tried and hanged for three of the bombings. According to a secret Israeli inquiry which was conducted in 1960, most of the witnesses believed that Jews had been responsible for the bombings, but they could not prove that the bombings were ordered by Israel. The issue remains unresolved: Iraqi activists in Israel still regularly claim that Israel used violence to engineer the exodus, but Israeli officials vehemently deny this accusation. According to historian Moshe Gatt, few historians believe that Israel was actually behind the bombing campaign—based on factors such as records which indicate that Israel did not want the registration of Iraqi Jews to occur at such a rapid rate and bomb throwing at Jewish targets was common before 1950, making the Istiqlal Party a more likely culprit than the Zionist underground. In any case, the remainder of Iraq's Jews left during the next few decades, and as a result, most of them were gone by 1970.

=== Japan ===
Japan does not have a native Jewish population; therefore, the history of antisemitism in Japan dates back to a period of time when it was introduced into Japan as a result of contact between Japan and the Western world. Nazi ideology and propaganda left its influence on Japan during World War II, and the Protocols of the Elders of Zion were subsequently translated into Japanese. Today, antisemitism and the belief in Jewish manipulation of Japan and the rest of the world remain widespread despite the small size of the Jewish community in Japan. Books about Jewish conspiracies are best sellers. According to a 1988 survey, 8% of Japanese people have read one of these books.

=== Malaysia ===
Although Malaysia presently has no substantial Jewish population, the country has reportedly become an example of a phenomenon called "antisemitism without Jews." The Anti-Defamation League's Global 100 Study found that 61% of Malaysia's adult population harboured antisemitic attitudes in 2013, a figure greater than in countries such as Indonesia and Iran at the time.

In his treatise on Malay identity, The Malay Dilemma, published in 1970, Malaysian Prime Minister Mahathir Mohamad wrote: "The Jews are not only hooked-nosed... but understand money instinctively... Jewish stinginess and financial wizardry gained them the economic control of Europe and provoked antisemitism which waxed and waned throughout Europe through the ages."

In 1984, Malaysia banned the playing of Jewish songs as well as any music composed by Jews. In 2003, Mahathir's political party distributed Malay language copies of Henry Ford's antisemitic book The International Jew.

In 2011, the Malay-language Utusan Malaysia daily stated in an editorial that Malaysians "cannot allow anyone, especially the Jews, to interfere secretly in this country's business... When the drums are pounded hard in the name of human rights, the pro-Jewish people will have their best opportunity to interfere in any Islamic country. We might not realize that the enthusiasm to support actions such as demonstrations will cause us to help foreign groups succeed in their mission of controlling this country." Prime Minister Najib Razak's office subsequently issued a statement late Monday saying Utusan's claim did "not reflect the views of the government."

In 2020, Mary Ainslie of the University of Nottingham Ningbo China said there were signs of an increasing rejection of antisemitism in Malaysia, including from younger Malays.

=== Lebanon ===
In 2004, Al-Manar, a media network which is affiliated with Hezbollah, aired a drama series, The Diaspora, which observers allege is based on historical antisemitic allegations. BBC correspondents who have watched the program state that it quotes extensively from the Protocols of the Elders of Zion. It has also been noted that Hezbollah affiliated schools include antisemitic material and material which is meant to incite extremism in their curriculum.

=== Pakistan ===
In Pakistan, negative stereotypes of Jews are widely believed. Jews are falsely accused of being "miserly" in fact, the Bene Israel who lived in Pakistan had numerous sororal and fraternal organizations which assisted Jews who were members of different denominations as well as practitioners of other faiths prior to Partition.

The founding of the Islamic state of Pakistan immediately prior to the creation of Israel in the Levant created insecurity among Pakistan's Jews. After Israel's independence in 1948, violent acts were committed against Pakistan's small Jewish community of about 2,000 Bene Israel Jews. The synagogue in Karachi was attacked, along with individual Jews. The persecution of Jews resulted in their exodus to India as refugees, many of them subsequently migrated to Israel, Canada, the United States, the UK and many Commonwealth countries. As a result, the Jewish community of Peshawar ceased to exist.

Pakistani cricket icon Imran Khan's marriage to Jemima Goldsmith in 1996 caused a furor in Pakistan, where Khan was accused of acting as an agent for the "Jewish Lobby". Egyptian newspapers in Pakistan made other antisemitic accusations against Khan. After Khan complained, the stories were retracted.

=== Saudi Arabia ===
Saudi textbooks vilify Jews, they call Jews apes; they demand that students do not interact with or befriend Jews; they claim that Jews worship the devil; and they encourage Muslims to engage in Jihad to vanquish Jews. Saudi Arabian government officials and state religious leaders often promote the idea that Jews are conspiring to take over the entire world; as proof of their claims, they publish and frequently cite The Protocols of the Elders of Zion as factual.

In 2004, the official Saudi Arabian tourism website stated that Jews and holders of Israeli passports would not be issued visas to enter the country. After an uproar, the restriction against Jews was removed from the website although the ban against Israeli passport-holders remained. In late 2014, a Saudi newspaper reported that foreign workers of most religions, including Judaism, were welcome in the kingdom, but Israeli citizens were not.

=== Palestine ===
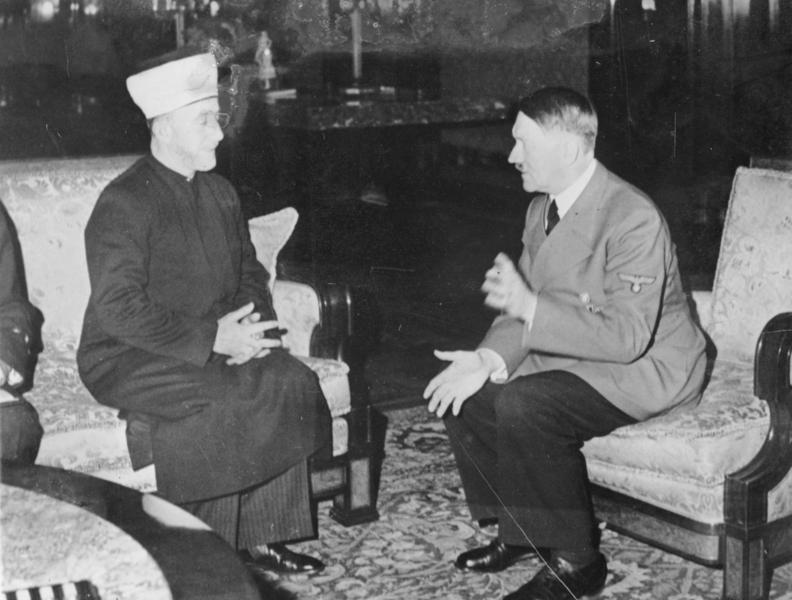
Haj Amin al-Husseini was a central figure of Palestinian nationalism in Mandatory Palestine. He took refuge in and collaborated with Nazi Germany during World War II. He met Adolf Hitler in December 1941 and was an essential figure in recruitment of Muslims into the SS. Many scholars view him as a staunch antisemite

In March 2011, the Israeli government issued a paper claiming that "Anti-Israel and anti-Semitic messages are heard regularly in the government and private media and in the mosques and are taught in school books," to the extent that they are "an integral part of the fabric of life inside the PA." In August 2012, Israeli Strategic Affairs Ministry director-general Yossi Kuperwasser stated that Palestinian incitement to antisemitism is "going on all the time" and that it is "worrying and disturbing." At an institutional level, he said the PA has been promoting three key messages to the Palestinian people that constitute incitement: "that the Palestinians would eventually be the sole sovereign on all the land from the Jordan River to the Mediterranean Sea; that Jews, especially those who live in Israel, were not really human beings but rather 'the scum of mankind'; and that all tools were legitimate in the struggle against Israel and the Jews." In August 2014, the Hamas' spokesman in Doha said on live television that Jews use blood to make matzos. During a meeting of the Palestinian National Council in 2018, President Mahmoud Abbas, who has a history of controversial statements about The Holocaust, stated that Jews in Europe were massacred for centuries because of their "social role related to usury and banks." The speech was widely condemned by Israel, the United Nations, the European Union, Germany, Sweden, United States, former officials of the Obama administration, Peace Now and the Anti-Defamation League. A New York Times editorial said "Let Abbas's vile words be his last as Palestinian leader."

=== Siam (now Thailand) ===
In 1914, Siam's King Rama VI Vajiravudh originated the phrase "Jews of the Orient" to describe overseas Chinese. He published an essay adopting Western antisemitic tropes to characterize Chinese as "vampires who steadily suck dry an unfortunate victim's lifeblood" because of their perceived lack of loyalty to Siam and the fact that they sent money back to China.

=== Syria ===
During the 19th century the Jews of Damascus were several times victims of calumnies, the gravest being those of 1840 and 1860, in the reign of the sultan Abdülmecit I. That of 1840, commonly known as the Damascus affair, was an accusation of ritual murder brought against the Jews in connection with the death of Father Thomas. A Jewish barber was tortured until he "confessed"; two other Jews who were arrested died under torture, while a third converted to Islam to save his life. The second accusation brought against the Jews, in 1860, was that of having taken part in the massacre of the Christians by the Druze and the Muslims. Five hundred Muslims, who had been involved in the affair, were hanged by the grand vizier Fuad Pasha. Two hundred Jews were awaiting the same fate, in spite of their innocence, and the whole Jewish community had been fined 4,000,000 piastres. The condemned Jews were saved only by the official intervention of Fuad Pasha himself; that of the Prussian consul, Dr. Wetzstein; of Sir Moses Montefiore of London, and of the bankers Abraham Salomon Camondo of Constantinople and Shemaya Angel of Damascus. From that time to the end of the nineteenth century, several further blood accusations were brought against the Jews; these, however, never provoked any great excitement.

There is a tiny Syrian Jewish community that is confined mainly to Damascus; remnants of a formerly 40,000 strong community. After the 1947 UN Partition plan in Palestine, there were heavy pogroms against Jews in Damascus and Aleppo. The Jewish property was confiscated or burned and after the establishment of the State of Israel, many fled to Israel and only 5000 Jews were left in Syria. Of these, 4000 more left after agreement with the United States in the 1990s. As of 2006, there are only 100–200 Jews left in Syria.

Rioters in Aleppo in 1947 burned the city's Jewish quarter and killed 75 people. In 1948, there were approximately 30,000 Jews in Syria. The Syrian government placed severe restrictions on the Jewish community, including on emigration. Over the next decades, many Jews managed to escape, and the work of supporters, particularly Judy Feld Carr, in smuggling Jews out of Syria, and bringing their plight to the attention of the world, raised awareness of their situation. Following the Madrid Conference of 1991 the United States put pressure on the Syrian government to ease its restrictions on Jews, and, in 1992, the government of Syria began granting exit visas to Jews on condition that they not emigrate to Israel. At that time, the country had several thousand Jews; today, under a hundred remain. The rest of the Jewish community have emigrated, mostly to the United States and Israel. There is a large and vibrant Syrian Jewish community in South Brooklyn, New York. In 2004, the Syrian government attempted to establish better relations with the emigrants, and 12 Syrian-Jews visited Syria.

=== Turkey ===
Despite close economic and military ties to Israel, Turkey has experienced a recent surge in antisemitic literature, most notably the sale of Mein Kampf, the autobiography of Adolf Hitler, which has become a bestseller through the country. Sales of the similarly themed books The Protocols of the Elders of Zion and The International Jew have also increased. In the same vein, the 2005 bestselling book Metal fırtına, which depicts a fictional war between Turkey and the United States, is described by the author, in an interview with Vatan, as helping people understand the realities behind Israel and the Jews, and would see how the Jews betrayed Turkey.

Antisemitic sentiments have also been observed in the Turkish media, such as in the nationalist Ortadogu, where Selcuk Duzgun, in an article titled Here is the Real Jew stated: "We are surrounded. Wherever we look we see traitors. Wherever we turn we see impure, false converts. Whichever stone you turn over, there is a Jew under it. And we keep thinking to ourselves: Hitler did not do enough to these Jews."

In the Milli Gazete, Turkish author Hakan Albayrak wrote an article accusing the Israeli Government of Genocide and stating Zionism itself constituted genocide. On January 8 the Islamist daily Yeni Şafak, published an article which alleged that the Israeli Government was attempting to set up farms in southeastern Turkey, and populate them with Russian and Ethiopian Jews whose integration into Israel they found difficult. In 2005, it was reported by journalists such as Ayhan Bilgin in Vakit, that the Mossad and Israel were responsible for planting mines which killed Turkish soldiers in southeast Turkey. Such claims have created a very negative atmosphere against Israelis and Turkish Jews. Antisemitism has also recently been observed in the publications Anadoluda Vakit and Yeniçağ.

Several antisemitic conspiracy theories from Islamists and ultra-nationalists in Turkey have attempted to demonize Jews and Israel. These theories have been fed in part by Turkish–Israeli arms modernization projects, agricultural projects in southeast Turkey connected to the South-East Anatolia Agricultural Irrigation Project, which employ Israeli experts; mutual visits of Turkish and Israeli officials; and the alleged role of the Mossad in northern Iraq (the Iraq War was highly unpopular in Turkey) making statements such as "The Mossad is the boss in Northern Iraq" have all nourished these theories. The common conspiracy theory that Jews, the supposed chosen people who consider themselves superior, are trying to take over the world by creating internal problems has also been cited by Turkish newspapers.

The well-known Turkish novelist Orhan Pamuk, often criticized and accused of being a traitor due to his interpretation of certain events in Turkish history, has been criticized as being "the servant of Jews," and "a Jew-lover" by the ultra-nationalist newspaper Yeniçağ.

=== Yemen ===
Jews in Yemen were long subject to a number of restrictions, ranging from attire, hairstyle, home ownership, marriage, etc. Under the "Orphan's Decree", many Jewish orphans below puberty were raised as Muslims. This practice began in the late 18th century, was suspended under Ottoman rule, then was revived in 1918. Most cases occurred in the 1920s, but sporadic cases occurred until the 1940s. In later years, the Yemenite government has taken some steps to protect the Jewish community in their country.

In 1947, riots killed at least 80 Jews in Aden. In 1948, there were about 63,000 Jews in Yemen, including Aden. Today, there are about 50 left. Increasingly hostile conditions led to the Israeli government's Operation Magic Carpet, the evacuation of 50,000 Jews from Yemen to Israel in 1949 and 1950. Emigration continued until 1962, with the outbreak of the Yemen civil war. A small community remained, unknown until 1976, but it appears that all infrastructure is lost now.

By the late 1990s, only several hundred remained, mainly in a northwestern mountainous region named Sa'ada and town of Raida. Houthi members put up notes on the Jews' doors, accusing them of corrupting Muslim morals. Eventually, the Houthi leaders sent threatening messages to the Jewish community: "We warn you to leave the area immediately.... We give you a period of 10 days, or you will regret it."

On March 28, 2021, 13 Jews were forced by the Houthis to leave Yemen, leaving the last four elderly Jews in Yemen.

== Europe ==
The summary of a 2004 poll by the "Pew Global Attitudes Project" noted, "Despite concerns about rising antisemitism in Europe, there are no indications that anti-Jewish sentiment has increased over the past decade. Favorable ratings of Jews are actually higher now in France, Germany and Russia than they were in 1991. Nonetheless, Jews are better liked in the U.S. than in Germany and Russia."

A German cartoon circa 1938 depicts Churchill as a Jewish octopus encircling the globe.

The Vienna-based European Union Monitoring Centre (EUMC), for 2002 and 2003, identified France, Germany, the United Kingdom, Belgium, and the Netherlands as EU member countries with notable increases in incidents. Many of these incidents can be linked to immigrant communities in these countries and result from heightened tensions in the Middle East. As these nations keep reliable and comprehensive statistics on antisemitic acts, and are engaged in combating antisemitism, their data was readily available to the EUMC.

In Eastern Europe, antisemitism remained a serious concern in Russia and Belarus, and elsewhere in the former Soviet Union, with most incidents carried out by ultra-nationalist and other far-right elements.

=== Denmark ===
Antisemitism in Denmark has not been as widespread as in other countries. Initially Jews were banned as in other countries in Europe, but beginning in the 17th century, Jews were allowed to live in Denmark freely, unlike in other European countries where they were forced to live in ghettos.

In 1819 a series of anti-Jewish riots in Germany spread to several neighboring countries including Denmark, resulting in mob attacks on Jews in Copenhagen and many provincial towns. These riots were known as Hep! Hep! Riots, from the derogatory rallying cry against the Jews in Germany. Riots lasted for five months during which time shop windows were smashed, stores looted, homes attacked, and Jews physically abused.

However, during World War II, Denmark was very uncooperative with the Nazi occupation on Jewish matters. Danish officials repeatedly insisted to the German occupation authorities that there was no "Jewish problem" in Denmark. As a result, even ideologically committed Nazis such as Reich Commissioner Werner Best followed a strategy of avoiding and deferring discussion of Denmark's Jews. When Denmark's German occupiers began planning the deportation of the 8,000 or so Jews in Denmark to Nazi concentration camps, many Danes and Swedes took part in a collective effort to evacuate the roughly 8,000 Jews of Denmark by sea to nearby Sweden (see also Rescue of the Danish Jews).

=== Estonia ===
In March 1996 the Russian-language newspaper Estoniya reported that antisemitic literature was being distributed by local Russian-speaking organizations; the literature was to be found mainly at the Narva centre of the Union of Russian Citizens in Estonia. The Estoniya reporter said he had asked Yuri Mishin, the chairman of the Union, whether such literature reflected the views of his organization; Mishin had replied that Estonia was a free country and people could read whatever they wished.

In April 1996 Estonian-language leaflets were found in Tallinn. The leaflets contained an illustration of a monster from a children's book to which the authors of the leaflets had added anti-Jewish slogans. The leaflets were signed by the Estonian National Working Party-New Estonian Legion. Also in April, German-language leaflets with anti-Jewish overtones calling for the deaths of top officials of Tartu University were found on the walls of student dormitories at the university.

In September 1996, the Jewish cemetery in Tallinn was vandalized; fourteen gravestones were damaged. The cemetery was vandalized again in 2019.

=== France ===
Antisemitism was particularly virulent in Vichy France during the Second World War. The Vichy government openly collaborated with the Nazi occupiers to identify Jews for deportation and transportation to the death camps.

Today, despite a steady trend of decreasing antisemitism among the indigenous population, acts of antisemitism are a serious cause for concern, as is tension between the Jewish and Muslim populations of France, both the largest in Europe. However, according to a poll by the Pew Global Attitudes Project, 71% of French Muslims had positive views of Jews, the highest percentage in the world. According to the National Advisory Committee on Human Rights, antisemitic acts account for a majority— 72% in all in 2003— of racist acts in France.

In July 2005 the Pew Global Attitudes Project found that 82% of French people questioned had favorable attitudes towards Jews, the second highest percentage of the countries questioned. The Netherlands was highest at 85%.

Holocaust denial and antisemitic speech are prohibited under the 1990 Gayssot Act.

Over the last several years, anti-Jewish violence, property destruction, and racist language has been wildly increasing and French-Jews are worried more every month that it will spiral even higher. France is home to Europe's largest population of Muslims — about 6 million – as well as the continent's largest community of Jews, about 600,000. Jewish leaders perceive an intensifying antisemitism in France, mainly among Muslims of Arab or African heritage, but also growing among Caribbean islanders from former colonies.

Ilan Halimi (1982 – February 13, 2006) was a young French Jew (of Moroccan parentage) kidnapped on January 21, 2006, by a gang of Muslim immigrants called the "Barbarians" and subsequently tortured to death over a period of three weeks. The murder, among whose motives authorities include antisemitism, incited a public outcry in a France already marked by intense public controversy about the role of children of immigrants in its society.

With the start of the Second Intifada in Israel, antisemitic incidents increased in France. In 2002, the Commission nationale consultative des droits de l'homme (Human Rights Commission) reported six times more antisemitic incidents than in 2001 (193 incidents in 2002). The commission's statistics showed that antisemitic acts constituted 62% of all racist acts in the country (compared to 45% in 2001 and 80% in 2000). The report documented 313 violent acts against people or property, including 38 injuries and the murder of someone with Maghrebin origins by far right skinheads.

=== Germany ===
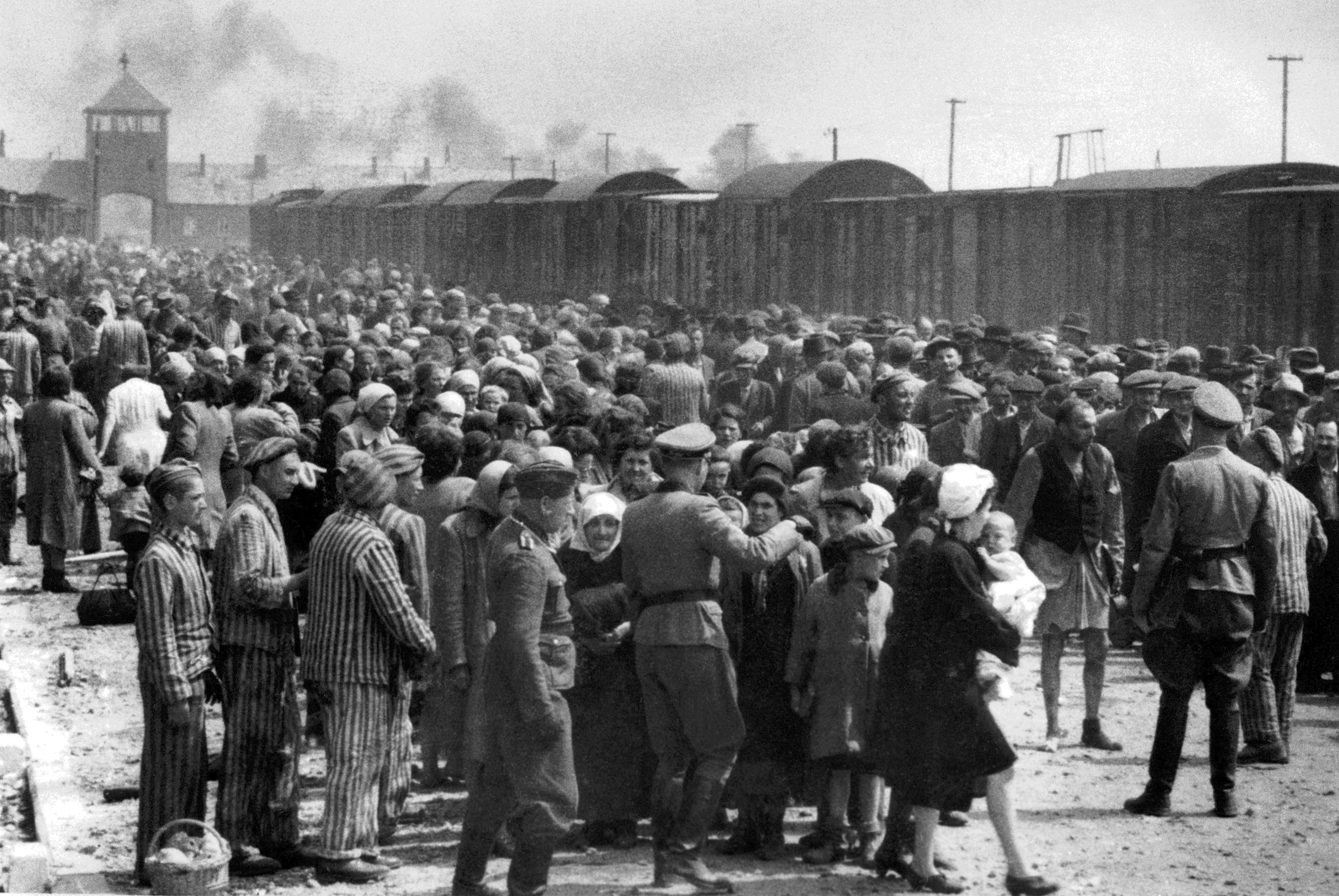
"Selection" on the Judenrampe, Auschwitz, May/June 1944. To be sent to the right meant slave labor; to the left, the gas chambers. This image shows the arrival of Hungarian Jews from Carpatho-Ruthenia, many of them from the Berehov ghetto. It was taken by Ernst Hofmann or Bernhard Walter of the SS. Courtesy of Yad Vashem.

From the early Middle Ages to the 18th century, the Jews in Germany were subject to many persecutions as well as brief times of tolerance. Though the 19th century began with a series of riots and pogroms against the Jews, emancipation followed in 1848, so that, by the early 20th century, the Jews of Germany were the most integrated in Europe. The situation changed in the early 1930s with the rise of the Nazis and their explicitly antisemitic program. Hate speech which referred to Jewish citizens as "dirty Jews" became common in antisemitic pamphlets and newspapers such as the Völkischer Beobachter and Der Stürmer. Additionally, blame was laid on German Jews for having caused Germany's defeat in World War I (see Dolchstosslegende).

Anti-Jewish propaganda expanded rapidly. Nazi cartoons depicting "dirty Jews" frequently portrayed a dirty, physically unattractive and badly dressed "talmudic" Jew in traditional religious garments similar to those worn by Hasidic Jews. Articles attacking Jewish Germans, while concentrating on commercial and political activities of prominent Jewish individuals, also frequently attacked them based on religious dogmas, such as blood libel.

The Nazi antisemitic program quickly expanded beyond mere speech. Starting in 1933, repressive laws were passed against Jews, culminating in the Nuremberg Laws which removed most of the rights of citizenship from Jews, using a racial definition based on descent, rather than any religious definition of who was a Jew. Sporadic violence against the Jews became widespread with the Kristallnacht riots, which targeted Jewish homes, businesses and places of worship, killing hundreds across Germany and Austria.

The antisemitic agenda culminated in the genocide of the Jews of Europe, known as the Holocaust.

=== Hungary ===
In June 1944, Hungarian police deported nearly 440,000 Jews in more than 145 trains, mostly to Auschwitz. Ultimately, over 400,000 Jews in Hungary were killed during the Holocaust. Although Jews were on both sides of the Hungarian Revolution of 1956, there was a perceptible antisemitic backlash against Jewish members of the former government led by Mátyás Rákosi.

Today, hatred towards Judaism and Israel can be observed from many prominent Hungarian politicians. The most famous example is the MIÉP party and its chairman, István Csurka.

Antisemitism in Hungary was manifested mainly in far right publications and demonstrations. MIÉP supporters continued their tradition of shouting antisemitic slogans and tearing the US flag to shreds at their annual rallies in Budapest in March 2003 and 2004, commemorating the 1848–49 revolution. Further, during the anniversary demonstrations of both right and left marking the 1956 uprising, antisemitic and anti-Israel slogans were heard from the right, such as accusing Israel of war crimes. The center-right traditionally keeps its distance from the right-wing demonstration, which was led by Csurka.

=== Norway ===
Jews were prohibited from living or entering Norway by paragraph 2 (known as the Jewish Paragraph in Norway) of the 1814 Constitution, which originally read, "The evangelical-Lutheran religion remains the public religion of the State. Those inhabitants, who confess thereto, are bound to raise their children to the same. Jesuits and monkish orders are not permitted. Jews are still prohibited from entry to the Realm." In 1851 the last sentence was struck out. Monks were permitted in 1897; Jesuits not before 1956.

The "Jewish Paragraph" was reinstated March 13, 1942, by Vidkun Quisling during Germany's occupation of Norway. The change was reversed when Norway was liberated in May 1945. Quisling was after the following legal purge deemed guilty of unlawful change of the Constitution.

=== Lithuania ===
The Jewish community in Lithuania numbers between 5,000 and 6,000 members (in 2026), according to Faina Kukliansky, president of the Jewish Community of Lithuania.

In November 2024, more than 5,000 people protested in Vilnius against the Social Democrats forming a coalition with the Nemunas Dawn party, whose leader Remigijus Žemaitaitis was on trial for antisemitic statements. In December 2025, Remigijus Žemaitaitis, leader of the Dawn of Nemunas party (a junior partner in the governing coalition), was convicted by the Vilnius Regional Court of inciting hatred against Jews and grossly minimizing the Holocaust in 2023 social media posts, receiving a €5,000 fine.

In January 2026, the Lithuanian government approved an action plan to combat antisemitism, xenophobia, and incitement to discord, with measures for prevention, response to hate speech and crimes, equality promotion, and support for Jewish life.

=== Poland ===
In 1264, Duke Boleslaus the Pious from Greater Poland legislated a Statute of Kalisz, a charter for Jewish residence and protection, which encouraged money-lending, hoping that Jewish settlement would contribute to the development of the Polish economy. By the 16th century, Poland had become the center of European Jewry and the most tolerant of European countries regarding faith, though occasionally it witnessed violent antisemitic incidents.

At the onset of the 17th century, tolerance began to give way to increased antisemitism. Elected to the Polish throne King Sigismund III of the Swedish House of Vasa, a supporter of the Counter-Reformation, began to undermine the principles of the Warsaw Confederation and the religious tolerance in the Polish–Lithuanian Commonwealth, revoking and limiting privileges of all non-Catholic faiths. In 1628 he banned publication of Hebrew books, including the Talmud. 20th century historian Simon Dubnow detailed:

At the end of the 16th century and thereafter, not one year passed without a blood libel trial against Jews in Poland, trials which always ended with the execution of Jewish victims in a heinous manner...

— Simon Dubnow, History of the Jews in Poland and Russia, volume 6, chapter 4

In the 1650s the Swedish invasion of the Commonwealth (The Deluge) and the Chmielnicki uprising of the Cossacks resulted in depopulation of the Commonwealth, as over 30% of the ~10 million population perished or emigrated. In the related 1648–55 pogroms led by the Ukrainian uprising against Polish nobility (szlachta), during which approximately 100,000 Jews were slaughtered, Polish and Ruthenian peasants often participated in killing Jews. The besieged szlachta, who were also decimated in the territories where the uprising happened, typically abandoned the loyal peasantry, townsfolk, and the Jews renting their land, in violation of "rental" contracts.

In the aftermath of the Deluge and Chmielnicki Uprising, many Jews fled to the less turbulent Netherlands, which had granted the Jews a protective charter in 1619. From then until the Nazi deportations in 1942, the Netherlands remained a tolerant haven for Jews in Europe, exceeding the tolerance extant in all other European countries, and becoming one of the few Jewish havens until the 19th century social and political reforms throughout much of Europe. Many Jews fled to England, open to Jews since the mid-17th century, where Jews were not typically persecuted.

In a reversal of roles that is common in Jewish history, the victorious Poles now vented their wrath upon the hapless Jews of the area, accusing them of collaborating with the Cossack invader!... The Jews, reeling from almost five years of constant hell, abandoned their Polish communities and institutions...

— Berel Wein, Triumph of Survival, 1990

Throughout the 16th to 18th centuries, many of the szlachta mistreated peasantry, townsfolk and Jews. Threat of mob violence was a spectre over the Jewish communities in Polish–Lithuanian Commonwealth at the time. On one occasion in 1696, a mob threatened to massacre the Jewish community of Posin, Vitebsk. The mob accused the Jews of murdering a Pole. At the last moment, a peasant woman emerged with the victim's clothes and confessed to the murder. One notable example of riots against Polish Jews is 1716, during which many Jews lost their lives.

On the other hand, the Polish–Lithuanian Commonwealth was a relative haven for Jews when compared to the partitions of Poland and the PLC's destruction in 1795 (see Imperial Russia and the Soviet Union, below).

Anti-Jewish sentiments continued to be present in Poland, even after the country regained its independence. One notable manifestation of these attitudes includes numerus clausus rules imposed, by almost all Polish universities in 1937.

In Poland, the semidictatorial government of Piłsudski and his successors, pressured by an increasingly vocal opposition on the radical and fascist right, implemented many anti-Semitic policies tending in a similar direction, while still others were on the official and semiofficial agenda when war descended in 1939.... In the 1930s the realm of official and semiofficial discrimination expanded to encompass limits on Jewish export firms... and, increasingly, on university admission itself. In 1921–22 some 25 percent of Polish university students were Jewish, but in 1938–39 their proportion had fallen to 8 percent.

— William W. Hagen, Before the "Final Solution": Toward a Comparative Analysis of Political Anti-Semitism in Interwar Germany and Poland article in Journal of Modern History (July 1996): 1–31

While there are many examples of Polish support and help for the Jews during World War II and the Holocaust, there are numerous examples of antisemitic incidents, and the Jewish population was certain of the indifference towards their fate from the Christian Poles. The Polish Institute for National Memory identified 24 pogroms against Jews during World War II, the most notable occurring at the massacre in Jedwabne in 1941.

After World War II, remaining anti-Jewish sentiments were used by the Communist party or individual politicians to achieve political goals, which peaked in the March 1968 events. These sentiments started to diminish only with the collapse of the communist rule in 1989, which resulted in a re-examination of events between Jewish and Christian Poles, with a number of incidents, like the massacre at Jedwabne, being discussed openly. Violent antisemitism in the 21st century is marginal compared to elsewhere, but there are few Jews remaining in Poland. Still, according to 2005 research by B'nai Briths Anti-Defamation League, Poland remains among the European countries (with others being Italy, Spain and Germany) with the largest percentages of people holding antisemitic views.

=== Spain ===
The first major persecution of Jews in Spain occurred on December 30, 1066, when the Jews were expelled from Granada and nearly 3,000 Jews were killed during the Granada massacre when they did not leave. This was the first persecution of Jews by the Muslims on the Peninsula under Islamic rule.

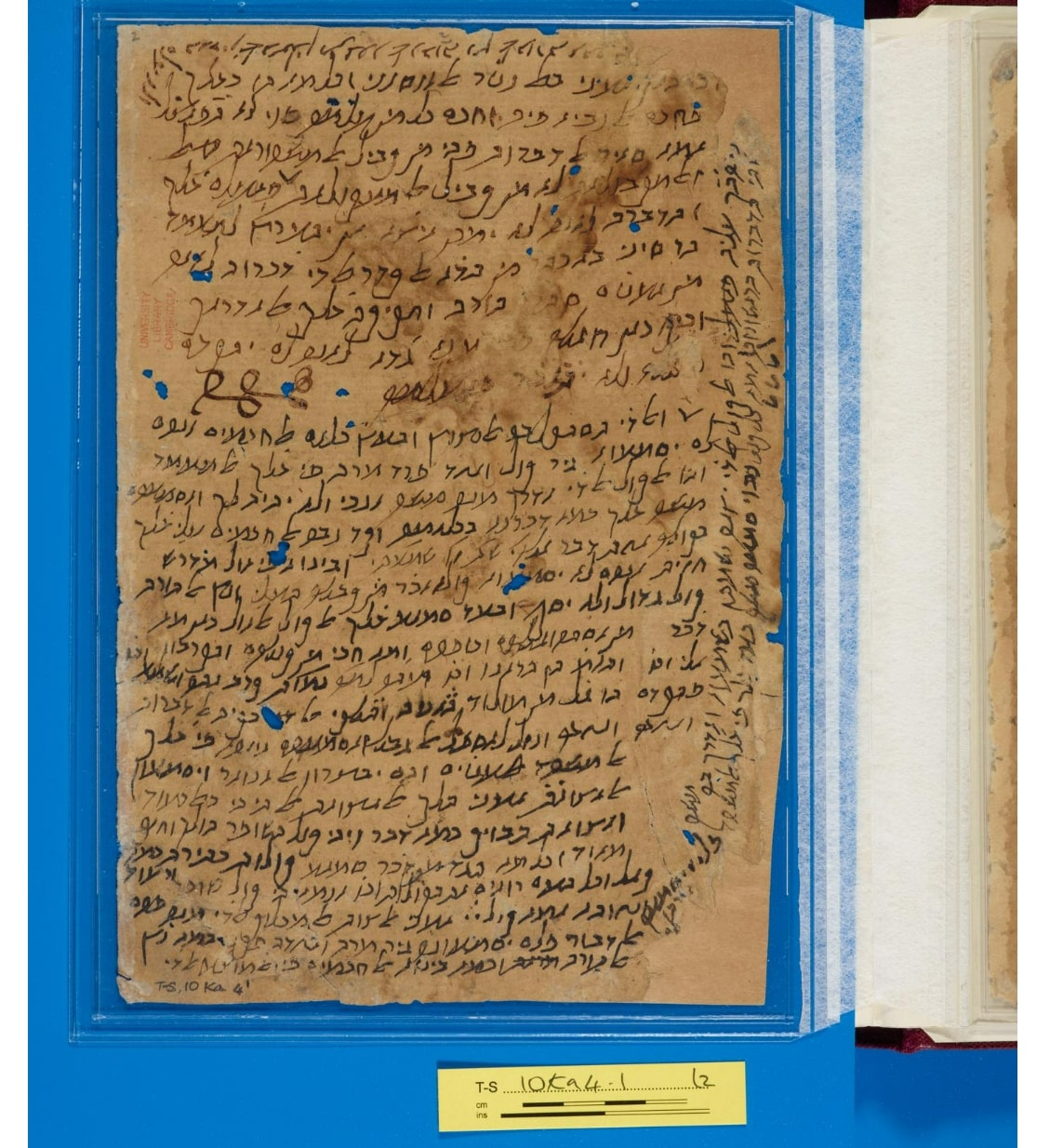
Manuscript page by Maimonides, one of the greatest Jewish scholars of Al Andalus, born in Córdoba. Arabic language in Hebrew letters.

A possible date of the end of the Golden Age might be in 1090 with the invasion of the Almoravids, a puritan Muslim sect from Morocco. Even under the Almoravids, some Jews prospered (although far more so under Ali III, than under his father Yusuf ibn Tashfin). Among those who held the title of "vizier" or "nasi" in Almoravid times were the poet and physician Abu Ayyub Solomon ibn al-Mu'allam, Abraham ibn Meïr ibn Kamnial, Abu Isaac ibn Muhajar, and Solomon ibn Farusal (although Solomon was murdered May 2, 1108). However, the Almoravids were ousted in 1148, to be replaced by the even more puritanical Almohades. Under the reign of the Almohades, the Jews were forced to accept the Islamic faith; the conquerors confiscated their property and took their wives and children, many of whom were sold as slaves. The most famous Jewish educational institutions were closed, and synagogues everywhere destroyed.

Most Muslims and Jews were forced to either convert to Christianity or leave Spain and Portugal and have their assets seized during the Reconquista . Many Muslims and Jews moved to North Africa rather than submit to forced conversion. During the Islamic administration, Christians and Jews were allowed to convert or retain their religions with many reduced rights and a token tax, which if not paid the penalty was death, although during the time of the Almoravids and especially the Almohads they were also treated badly, in contrast to the policies of the earlier Umayyad rulers.

=== Sweden ===
Sweden has a relatively small Jewish community of around 20,000. Jews have been permitted to immigrate to Sweden since the late 18th century, at first only to Stockholm, Gothenburg and Norrköping, but this restriction was removed in 1854. In 1870 Jews received full citizenship and the first Jewish members of parliament (riksdagen), Aron Philipson and Moritz Rubenson, were elected in 1873. However Swedish non-Protestants, most of which were Catholics and Jews, were still not allowed to teach the subject of Christianity in public schools or to be government ministers (statsråd); these restrictions were removed in 1951. Yiddish has legal status as one of the country's official minority languages.

There have, however, been a number of antisemitic incidents in recent years, and after Germany and Austria, Sweden has the highest rate of antisemitic incidents in Europe. Though the Netherlands reports a higher rate of antisemitism in some years. A government study in 2006 estimated that 15% of Swedes agree with the statement: "The Jews have too much influence in the world today". Five percent of the entire adult population, and 39% of the Muslim population, harbor strong and consistent antisemitic views. Former Prime Minister Göran Persson described these results as "surprising and terrifying". However, the Rabbi of Stockholm's Orthodox Jewish community, Meir Horden claimed that "It's not true to say that the Swedes are anti-Semitic. Some of them are hostile to Israel because they support the weak side, which they perceive the Palestinians to be."

=== Russia and the Soviet Union ===
The Pale of Settlement was the Western region of Imperial Russia to which Jews were restricted by the Tsarist Ukase of 1792. It consisted of the territories of former Polish–Lithuanian Commonwealth, annexed with the existing numerous Jewish population, and the Crimea (which was later cut out from the Pale).

During 1881–1884, 1903–1906 and 1914–1921, waves of antisemitic pogroms swept Russian Jewish communities. At least some pogroms are believed to have been organized or supported by the Russian Okhrana. Although there is no hard evidence for this, the Russian police and army generally displayed indifference to the pogroms, for instance during the three-day First Kishinev pogrom of 1903.

During this period the May Laws policy was also put into effect, banning Jews from rural areas and towns, and placing strict quotas on the number of Jews allowed into higher education and many professions. The combination of the repressive legislation and pogroms propelled mass Jewish emigration, and by 1920 more than two million Russian Jews had emigrated, most to the United States while some made aliya to the Land of Israel.

One of the most infamous antisemitic tractates was the Russian Okhrana literary hoax, The Protocols of the Elders of Zion, created to blame the Jews for Russia's problems during the period of revolutionary activity.

Even though many Old Bolsheviks were ethnically Jewish, they sought to uproot Judaism and Zionism and established the Yevsektsiya to achieve this goal. By the end of the 1940s the Communist leadership of the former USSR had liquidated almost all Jewish organizations, including Yevsektsiya.

Stalin sought to segregate Russian Jews into "Soviet Zion", with the help of Komzet and OZET in 1928. The Jewish Autonomous Oblast with the center in Birobidzhan in the Russian Far East attracted only limited settlement, and never achieved Stalin's goal of an internal exile for the Jewish people.

Stalin's antisemitic campaign of 1948–1953 against so-called "rootless cosmopolitans," destruction of the Jewish Anti-Fascist Committee, the fabrication of the "Doctors' plot," the rise of "Zionology" and subsequent activities of official organizations such as the Anti-Zionist committee of the Soviet public were officially carried out under the banner of "anti-Zionism," but the use of this term could not obscure the antisemitic content of these campaigns, and by the mid-1950s the state persecution of Soviet Jews emerged as a major human rights issue in the West and domestically. See also: Jackson–Vanik amendment, Refusenik, Pamyat.

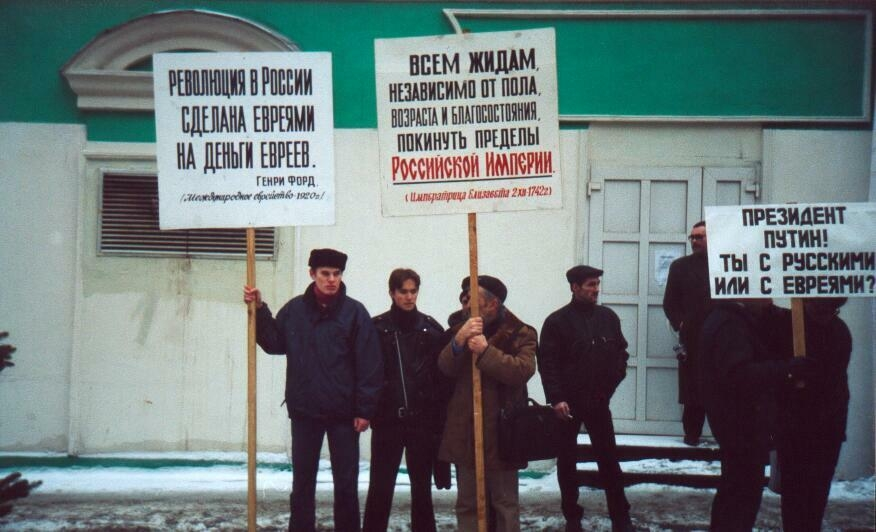
A demonstration in Russia. The antisemitic slogans cite Henry Ford and Empress Elizabeth.

In the early 21st century, antisemitic pronouncements, speeches and articles were common in Russia, and there were a large number of antisemitic neo-Nazi groups in the republics of the former Soviet Union, leading Pravda to declare in 2002 that "antisemitism is booming in Russia." There also were bombs found attached to antisemitic signs, apparently aimed at Jews, and other violent incidents, including stabbings, have been recorded.

Though the government of Vladimir Putin takes an official stand against antisemitism, some political parties and groups are explicitly antisemitic, in spite of a Russian law (Art. 282) against fomenting racial, ethnic or religious hatred. In 2005, a group of 15 Duma members demanded that Judaism and Jewish organizations be banned from Russia. In June, 500 prominent Russians, including some 20 members of the nationalist Rodina party, demanded that the state prosecutor investigate ancient Jewish texts as "anti-Russian" and ban Judaism—the investigation was actually launched, but halted amid international outcry.

=== Ukraine ===
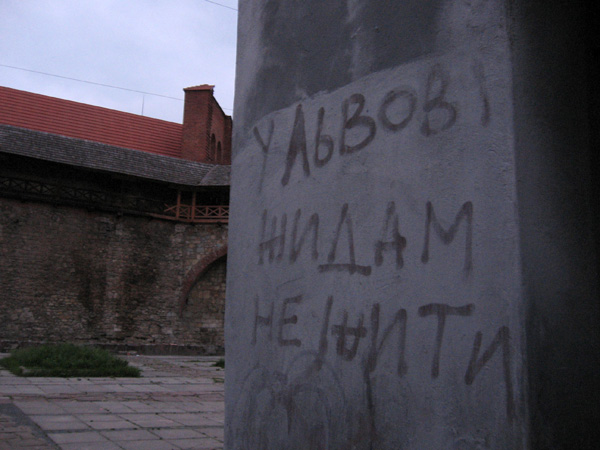
"The kikes will not reside in Lviv." Graffiti in medieval Jewish ghetto in Lviv, Ukraine.

Ukraine experienced brutal antisemitism during the WW2. Ukrainian nationalists of OUN (b) organized an assembly in Nazi occupied Cracow in April 1940 and the assembly proclaimed: "The kikes in the USSR are the most faithful basement of the Bolshevic regime and the vanguard of the Moscow imperialism in Ukraine... The Organization of Ukrainian nationalists fights against the kikes as the basement of the Moscow Bolshevik regime with the understanding that Moscow is the main enemy". The Ukrainian nationalists proclaimed the independent Ukrainian state in the first days of Nazi occupation of Western Ukraine and the nationalist Yaroslav Stecko, the leader of the newly created Ukrainian state proclaimed: "Moscow and the kikes are the most dangerous enemies of Ukraine. I think that the key enemy is Moscow that took Ukraine into slavery. Nevertheless, I estimate the hostile and pest will of the kikes who assisted Moscow to enslave Ukraine. Therefore, I hold my position to exterminate the kikes and consider the German methods of extermination of the kikes be advisable excluding the any possibility of assimilation".

== North America ==
=== United States ===
In the mid-1600s, Peter Stuyvesant, the last Dutch Director-General of the colony of New Amsterdam, sought to bolster the position of the Dutch Reformed Church by trying to reduce religious competition from denominations such as Jews, Lutherans, Catholics and Quakers. He stated that the Jews were "deceitful", "very repugnant", and "hateful enemies and blasphemers of the name of Christ". He warned in a subsequent letter that in "giving them liberty we cannot (then) refuse the Lutherans and Papists". However, religious plurality was already a legal-cultural tradition in New Amsterdam and in the Netherlands. His superiors at the Dutch West India Company in Amsterdam overruled him in all matters of intolerance.

In 1939 a Roper poll found that only thirty-nine percent of Americans felt that Jews should be treated like other people. Fifty-three percent believed that "Jews are different and should be restricted" and ten percent believed that Jews should be deported. Several surveys taken from 1940 to 1946 found that Jews were seen as a greater threat to the welfare of the United States than any other national, religious, or racial group. It has been estimated that 190,000 – 200,000 Jews could have been saved during the Second World War had it not been for bureaucratic obstacles to immigration deliberately created by Breckinridge Long and others.

In a speech at an America First rally on September 11, 1941, in Des Moines, Iowa, entitled "Who Are the War Agitators?", Charles Lindbergh claimed that three groups had been "pressing this country toward war": the Roosevelt Administration, the British, and the Jews – and complained about what he insisted was the Jews' "large ownership and influence in our motion pictures, our press, our radio and our government." The antisemitism of Lindbergh is one of the subjects of the novel The Plot Against America (2004) by Philip Roth.

Unofficial antisemitism was also widespread in the first half of the century. For example, to limit the growing number of Jewish students between 1919 and 1950s a number of private liberal arts universities and medical and dental schools employed Numerus clausus. These included Harvard University, Columbia University, Cornell University, and Boston University. In 1925 Yale University, which already had such admissions preferences as "character", "solidity", and "physical characteristics" added a program of legacy preference admission spots for children of Yale alumni, in an explicit attempt to put the brakes on the rising percentage of Jews in the student body. This was soon copied by other Ivy League and other schools, and admissions of Jews were kept down to 10% through the 1950s. Such policies were for the most part discarded during the early 1960s.

Some cults also support conspiracy theories regarding Jews as dominating and taking over the world. These cults are often vitriolic and severely antisemitic. For instance, the Necedah Shrine Cult from the 1950s on to the mid-1980s, has Mary Ann Van Hoof receiving antisemitic "visions" from the Virgin Mary telling her that the Rothschilds, a prominent Jewish banking family, are "mongrel yids(Jews)" bent on dominating the entire world economy through international banking. Most of the worlds problems, from poverty to world wars, are the cause of International Banking Jews and their "satanic secret society," according to Van Hoof.

American antisemitism underwent a modest revival in the late twentieth century. The Nation of Islam under Louis Farrakhan claimed that Jews were responsible for slavery, economic exploitation of black labor, selling alcohol and drugs in their communities, and unfair domination of the economy. Jesse Jackson issued his infamous "Hymietown" remarks during the 1984 Presidential primary campaign.

According to ADL surveys begun in 1964, African-Americans are "significantly more likely" than white Americans to hold antisemitic beliefs, although there is a strong correlation between education level and the rejection of antisemitic stereotypes.

Strommen et al.'s 1970 survey of 4,745 North American Lutherans aged 15–65 found that, compared to the other minority groups under consideration, Lutherans were the least prejudiced toward Jews.

=== Canada ===
Canada's Jewish community dates back to the 18th century, and antisemitism has confronted Canadian Jews since this time.

== South America ==
=== Argentina ===
A growing hate campaign was reported on January 21, 2015, against Israeli tourists in Patagonia, with a notable incident in Lago Puelo where four men shouted anti-Jewish slurs and violently attacked 10 Israelis staying at a hostel. The attackers were later charged under Argentina's anti-discrimination law and fined approximately $5,700. In December 2014, posters saying "Boycott Against Israeli Military Tourism" were put up in Bariloche, a city popular with Israeli tourists.

=== Chile ===
After a 23-year-old Israeli backpacker was arrested in January 2012 on suspicion of having accidentally ignited a fire in Torres del Paine National Park, he reportedly received taunts calling him a "filthy Jew" while being escorted to court. In February 2017, National Forest Corporation director Elizabeth Munoz criticized Israeli visitors for "cultural bad behavior" and said they would be removed from hostels if they presented "an aggressive attitude", her comments were denounced by Chile's umbrella Jewish organization.

Chilean politician and former presidential candidate Daniel Jadue has faced accusations of antisemitism.

=== Peru ===
During the 1930s, the Jewish community in Peru saw itself negatively affected with the establishment of the Revolutionary Union, a fascist political party founded by Luis Miguel Sánchez Cerro, who served as president from 1931 until his assassination in 1933. Luis A. Flores assumed the party's leadership following his death, leading it towards a more radical shift in ideology. This antisemitic sentiment led to attacks on some Jewish-owned businesses in Lima.

On April 28, 2026, while speaking at a ceremony for the Chamber of Commerce of Lima, Peruvian president José María Balcázar stated that Jewish people were responsible for pushing Nazi Germany into the Second World War while also claiming they controlled the banks and practiced usury. The statements were made in reference to a book written by Spanish philosopher Antonio Escohotado. In the immediate aftermath, Balcázar drew widespread condemnation, including from the governments of both Israel and Germany.

=== Uruguay ===
A 2014 poll from the Anti-Defamation League had 33% of Uruguayan respondents classified as harbouring antisemitic attitudes. In January 2018, an Uruguayan hotelier was reported to have a policy of rejecting Israeli post-military youth as his guests, which drew criticism from Uruguay's umbrella Jewish organisation Central Israelite Committee, its Minister of Tourism Liliam Kechichian, and B'nai B'rith International.

=== Venezuela ===
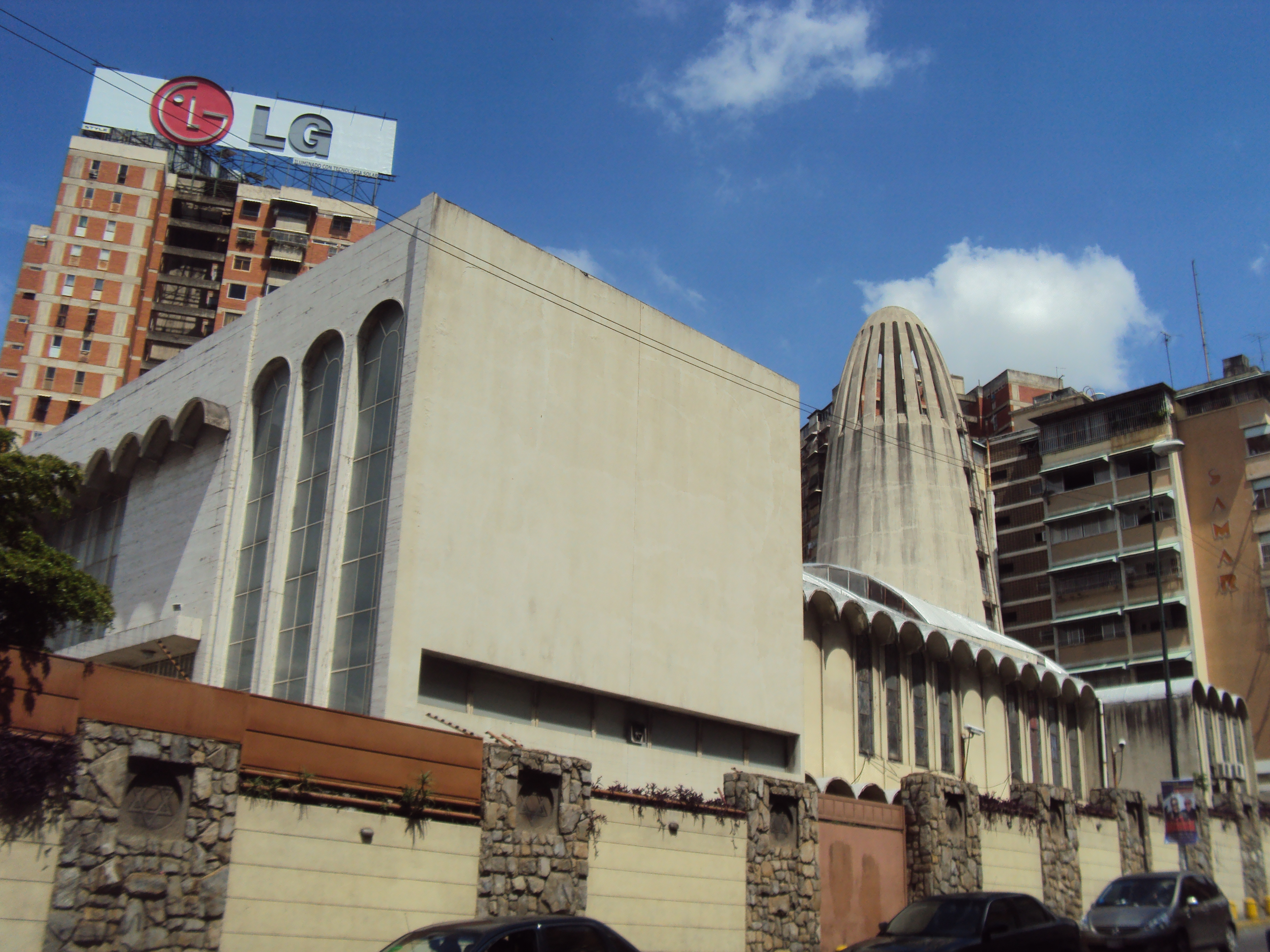
The Tiféret Israel Synagogue in Caracas was attacked in 2009.

Following the onset of the 2009 Israel-Gaza conflict, the Venezuelan government expressed disagreement with Israel's actions. On January 5, President Chávez accused the United States of poisoning Palestinian president Yasser Arafat to destabilize the Middle East. He also described the offensive by Israel as a Palestinian "holocaust". Days later, the Venezuelan foreign ministry called Israel's actions "state terrorism" and announced the expulsion of the Israeli ambassador and some of the embassy staff. Following the order of expulsion of the Israeli ambassador, incidents targeting various Jewish institutions occurred in Venezuela. Protests occurred in Caracas with demonstrators throwing shoes at the Israeli Embassy while some sprayed graffiti on the facility. At the Tiféret Israel Synagogue, individuals spray painted "Property of Islam" on its walls. Later that month, the synagogue was targeted again. During the night of January 31, 2009, an armed gang consisting of 15 unidentified men broke into Tiféret Israel Synagogue, the synagogue of the Israelite Association of Venezuela, the oldest synagogue in the Venezuelan capital Caracas and occupied the building for several hours. The gang tied and gagged security guards before destroying offices and the place where holy books were kept; this happened during the Jewish shabbat. They daubed the walls with antisemitic and anti-Israeli graffiti that called for Jews to be expelled from the country. They had also stolen a database that listed Jews who lived in Venezuela.

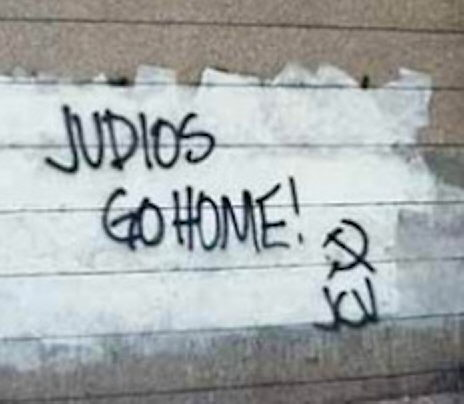
Antisemitic graffiti in Venezuela, alongside a hammer and sickle

In a 2009 news story, Michael Rowan and Douglas E. Schoen wrote, "In an infamous Christmas Eve speech several years ago, Chávez said the Jews killed Christ and have been gobbling up wealth and causing poverty and injustice worldwide ever since." Hugo Chávez stated that "[t]he world is for all of us, then, but it so happens that a minority, the descendants of the same ones that crucified Christ, the descendants of the same ones that kicked Bolívar out of here and also crucified him in their own way over there in Santa Marta, in Colombia. A minority has taken possession of all of the wealth of the world."

In February 2012, opposition candidate for the 2012 Venezuelan presidential election Henrique Capriles was subject to what foreign journalists characterized as vicious attacks by state-run media sources. The Wall Street Journal said that Capriles "was vilified in a campaign in Venezuela's state-run media, which insinuated he was, among other things, a homosexual and a Zionist agent". A February 13, 2012, opinion article in the state-owned Radio Nacional de Venezuela, titled "The Enemy is Zionism" attacked Capriles' Jewish ancestry and linked him with Jewish national groups because of a meeting he had held with local Jewish leaders, saying, "This is our enemy, the Zionism that Capriles today represents... Zionism, along with capitalism, are responsible for 90% of world poverty and imperialist wars."

== See also ==
- Antisemitic trope
- Antisemitism in the Arab world
- Antisemitism in Christianity
- Antisemitism in Islam
- Arab–Israeli conflict
- Economic antisemitism
- Expulsions and exoduses of Jews
- History of ancient Israel and Judah
- History of antisemitism
- History of Israel
- History of the Jews and Judaism in the Land of Israel
- History of the Jews during World War II
- History of the Jews under Muslim rule
- History of Palestine
- History of Zionism
- The Holocaust
- Islamic–Jewish relations
- Israeli–Palestinian conflict
- Jewish diaspora
- Jewish ethnic divisions
- Jewish exodus from the Muslim world
- Jewish history
- Jewish population by country
- Jewish views on religious pluralism
- Judaism and violence
- Martyrdom in Judaism
- New antisemitism
- Normalization of antisemitism
- Persecution of Jews
- Racial antisemitism
- Racism by country
- Racism in the Arab world
- Racism in Muslim communities
- Religious antisemitism
- Secondary antisemitism
- Stereotypes of Jews
- Xenophobia and racism in the Middle East
