= Tiféret Israel Synagogue attack =

Profanation of the Tiféret Israel Synagogue, Caracas, Venezuela

- Part of the spillover of the 2008–2009 Gaza War
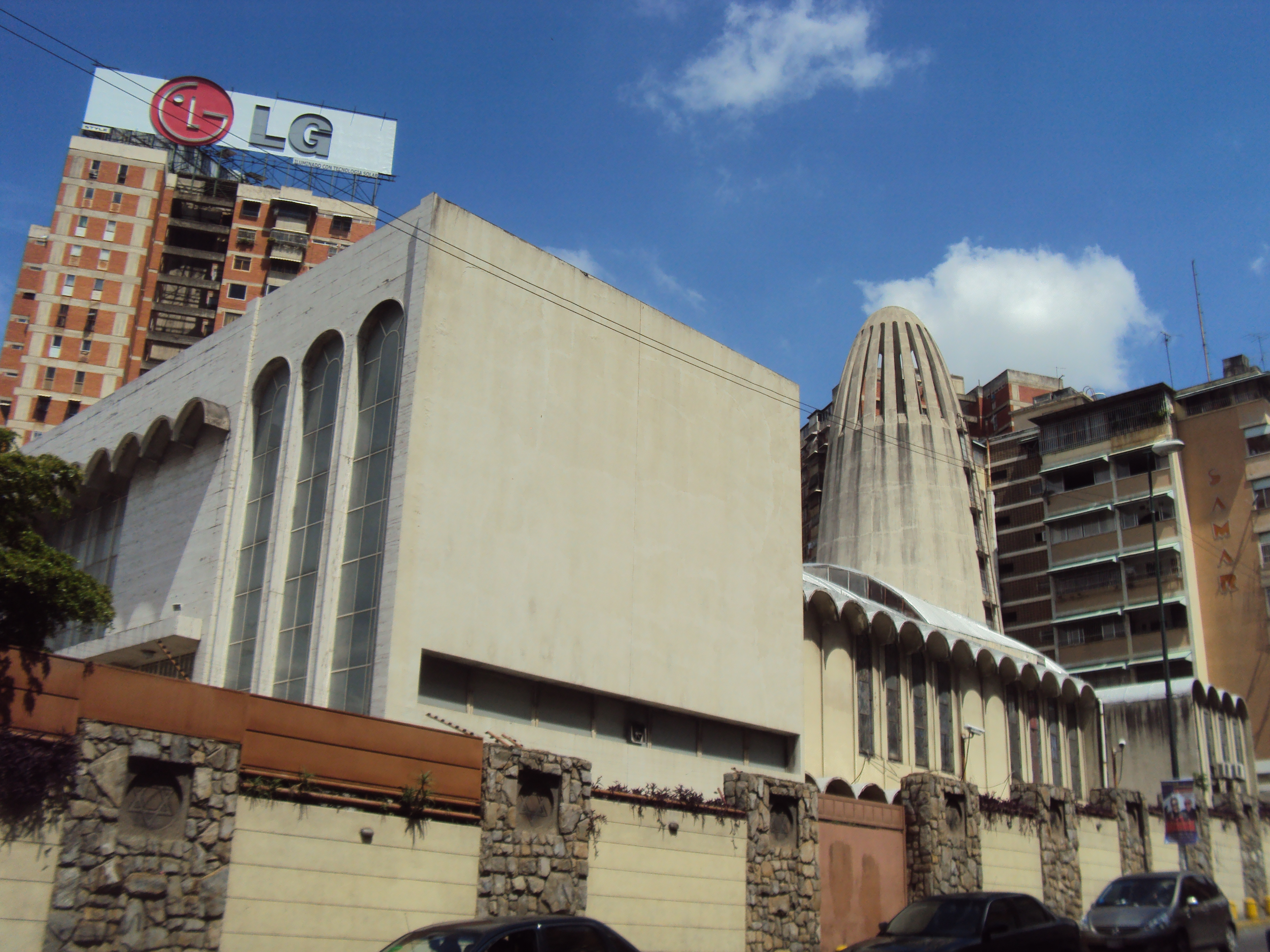
- The Tiféret Israel Synagogue, target of the attack
- Location: 10.4989°N 66.8883°W; Caracas, Venezuela
- Date: 31 January 2009; 17 years ago
- Target: Tiféret Israel Synagogue
- No. of participants: 15

The Tiféret Israel Synagogue attack was an attack on Caracas, Venezuela's oldest synagogue that took place on the night of 31 January 2009, during Shabbat. The attack occurred amid a rise in tensions prompted by the 2008–2009 Gaza War, after Venezuela severed diplomatic relations with Israel and Israel responded by expelling Venezuelan officials from the country.

== Background ==
Following the onset of the 2009 Israel-Gaza conflict, the Venezuelan government expressed disagreement with Israel's actions. On 5 January, Venezuelan President Hugo Chávez accused the United States of poisoning Palestinian president Yasser Arafat in order to destabilize the Middle East. He also described the offensive by Israel as a Palestinian "holocaust". Days later, the Venezuelan foreign ministry called Israel's actions "state terrorism" and announced the expulsion of the Israeli ambassador and some of the embassy staff.

Following the order of expulsion of the Israeli ambassador, incidents targeting various Jewish institutions occurred in Venezuela. Protests occurred in Caracas with demonstrators throwing shoes at the Israeli Embassy while some sprayed graffiti on the facility. At the Tiféret Israel Synagogue, individuals spray-painted "Property of Islam" on its walls.

== Attack ==
During the night of 31 January 2009, an armed gang consisting of 15 unidentified people broke into Tiféret Israel Synagogue, the synagogue of the Israelite Association of Venezuela and the oldest synagogue in the Venezuelan capital Caracas and occupied the building for several hours. Security guards were tied up and gagged and the gang destroyed offices and the repository where the holy books were stored; this happened during the Jewish Shabbat. They daubed the walls with antisemitic and anti-Israeli graffiti that called for Jews to be expelled from the country. They also stole a database that listed Jews who lived in Venezuela.

The vandals had also stolen the security footage of the incident, however, the computers with the recordings were recovered in the course of the investigation.

== Investigation ==
In February 2009 the Venezuelan authorities arrested 11 individuals in connection with the attack, including eight members of various police forces. (Initially, the number of police involved was reported as seven.)

According to El Universal, the investigative report stated that one of eleven arrested defendants, Edgar Alexander Cordero, a bodyguard for a rabbi at the synagogue and a metropolitan police officer, asked the rabbi for a loan which he refused to give. Cordero decided to rob the synagogue of money, which he believed was locked in its safes. According to Interior Minister Tarek El Aissami, anti-semitic vandalism had merely been a tactic, "First, to weaken the investigation, and second, to direct the blame toward the national government."

At least 6 of the 11 individuals arrested were eventually convicted of aggravated robbery, among other crimes.

== Reactions ==
Nicolás Maduro, who was the acting Venezuelan Foreign Minister at the time, condemned the act as a "criminal act of vandalism". The Information Minister Jesse Chacón also condemned the attack; he denied that there was any connection with the government.

=== International protest ===
- United States: In New York, around 250 people, including Jews and Venezuelans, protested in front of the Venezuelan consulate for the attacks on the synagogue. The event was supported by the Anti-Defamation League, the Jewish Community Relations Board, the American Jewish Committee, and the Simon Wiesenthal Center. US politicians called on President Hugo Chávez to protect the country's Jewish population following the event. Sixteen Democrats and Republicans wrote a letter demanding an "end to the intimidation and harassment of the Jewish community."
- Israel: Israel's Foreign Ministry strongly condemned the desecration of Caracas' main synagogue and accused Venezuelan authorities of instigating the attack. The spokesman for the ministry, Yigal Palmor, declared that they considered "this attack to be reprehensible and unacceptable,"and "that this type of violence can only occur in Venezuela with the approval of the authorities at the highest level of the State," adding that "we know that the Venezuelan people are neither racist nor anti-Semitic." The spokesman acknowledged that an increase in anti-Semitic acts in Venezuela and other countries had been detected in the last month, but warned that the act against the synagogue "is particularly alarming." Likewise, he maintained that Israel would not send any message to Venezuela, declaring that "relations have been cut off abruptly by President Chávez's decision, so there remains no official dialogue channel open."
- Peru: At least fifty members of the Jewish community in Peru and Peruvian citizens of other religions protested in front of the Venezuelan embassy in Lima against the attack wearing white and carrying banners, later delivering a protest letter against the desecration of the synagogue at the embassy, demanding that the case be investigated and those responsible for the attack punished.

== See also ==
- Antisemitism in Venezuela
- Antisemitic incidents during the Gaza War (2008–2009)
