= Metal Storm (disambiguation) =

Metal Storm was an Australian small arms weapon system.

Metal Storm or Metalstorm can also refer to:

- Metal Storm (webzine), a popular metal music website
- Metal fırtına, a Turkish novel whose title translates to "Metal Storm"
- Metal Storm (video game), a 1991 video game by Irem
- Metalstorm (video game) by Starform
- Metalstorm: The Destruction of Jared-Syn, a 1983 science fiction movie
- "Metal Storm / Face the Slayer", a song from the 1983 album Show No Mercy by Slayer
- Metalstorm, a fictional film that is the subject of the 2024 film The Fall Guy
