= Bet-El Synagogue (Caracas) =

Sephardic Orthodox synagogue in Caracas, Venezuela

- Hebrew: בית הכנסת בית-אל (קראקס); Spanish: Asociación Bet-El
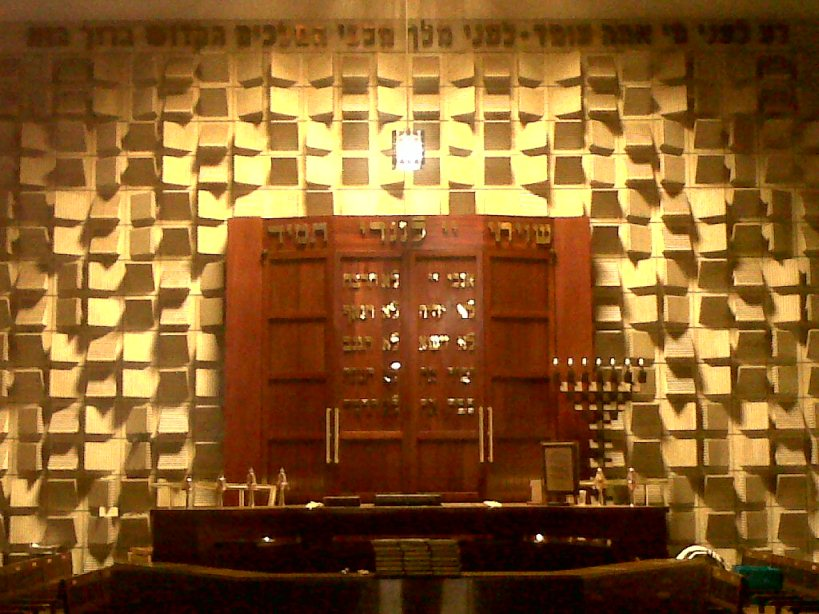
- Heichal, designed by Harry Abend

- Location of the synagogue in Venezuela

Religion
- Affiliation: Orthodox Judaism
- Rite: Nusach Sefard
- Ecclesiastical or organizational status: Synagogue
- Ownership: Israelite Association of Venezuela
- Leadership: Rabbi Isaac Sananes
- Status: Active

Location
- Location: Avenida Cajigal, San Bernardino, Caracas
- Country: Venezuela
- Interactive map of Bet-El Synagogue
- Coordinates: 10.51342537°N 66.90291477°W

Architecture
- Funded by: Edmond Safra
- Groundbreaking: 1969
- Completed: 1973
- Capacity: 400 worshippers

The Bet-El Synagogue (Hebrew: בית הכנסת בית-אל (קראקס), lit. 'House of God'; Spanish: Asociación Bet-El), is an Orthodox Jewish congregation and synagogue, located on Avenida Cajigal, in the San Bernardino neighborhood of Caracas, Venezuela. The congregation is affiliated with the Israelite Association of Venezuela and worships in the Sephardic rite.

Currently, the rabbi of the synagogue is Isaac Sananes.

== History ==
The synagogue was built between 1969 and 1973, with donations from Brazilian banker Edmond Safra. The congregation comprises Jews mostly from Aleppo (Syria), Melilla (Spain) and northern Morocco, especially from the cities of Tetouan and Chefchaouen.

The synagogue can accommodate about 300 people in the men's section, which is adorned with stained glass windows designed by the Israeli artist Yaacov Agam; in addition to this, the wall that contains the Heichal is a sculpture made by the Venezuelan artist Harry Abend and can accommodate about 100 people in the women's section upstairs. The synagogue also has a lounge in the basement, which is used for celebrations and bar and bat mitzvahs, wedding receptions, meals and the sheva Brachot ritual, which was inaugurated in 1988. On the top floor of the building, next to the area of prayers used by women, is a study room or Bet Midrash. Available in the synagogue are Torah with Rashi, prayer books in Hebrew and phonetic translation and Spanish for those who do not completely dominate the Hebrew language.

== See also ==
- History of the Jews in Venezuela
- List of synagogues in Venezuela
