= Metal Fırtına =

2004 novel by Orkun Uçar and Burak Turna

Metal Storm
- Author: Orkun Uçar, Burak Turna
- Original title: Metal Fırtına
- Language: Turkish
- Publication date: 2004
- Publication place: Turkey

Metal Fırtına (English: Metal Storm) is a 2004 novel by Turkish writers Orkun Uçar and Burak Turna. It became an immediate bestseller in Turkey, with several hundred thousand copies sold as of 2006.

The book gained international attention mainly because of its plot about a war between Turkey and the United States (who are NATO allies) and because of its enthusiastic reception in Turkey. According to the Turkish newspaper Radikal, "the Foreign Ministry and General Staff are reading it keenly" and "all cabinet members also have it".

The book's plot and reception is thought by most observers to reflect an increasing level of Anti-Americanism in the wake of the war on terror, the Iraq War and especially the "2003 Hood Event" that was perceived as a national humiliation in Turkey.

The U.S. government in the novel is led by a nameless president reminiscent of George W. Bush and portrayed as an Evangelical zealot. It also includes real-life U.S. Cabinet members Condoleezza Rice and Donald Rumsfeld. The novel also features then-current real-life political leaders at the helm of their respective nations.

== Plot ==
In 2007, the United States invades Turkey to gain control of its deposits of an important strategic resource, borax. After securing the principal cities in Turkey, the United States attempts to re-enact the Treaty of Sèvres by dividing Turkey up between its historic rivals Greece and Armenia. Turkey responds by forming a military alliance with China, Russia and Germany. A Turkish agent then steals an American nuclear bomb and detonates it in Washington, D.C., killing millions of people. This however, backfires and U.S. troops increase their abuse of occupied Turkish citizens and the invasion picks up in pace. When American troops reach Istanbul, the conflict degrades to urban combat between U.S. forces, Turkish armed citizenry, Turkish Army remnants and police forces. The climax turns out to be anticlimactic; the occupation of Istanbul agitates Russia, the European Union and China to sign a military alliance and threaten the United States with nuclear warfare in order to stop the invasion. The war comes to a close; U.S. forces retreat, and Turkey is saved. The agent, a member of a secret Turkish intelligence agency named "The Grey Team", trained from birth as obedient and amoral orphans, kidnaps the mastermind behind the invasion, the CEO of a corporation funding the U.S. president, and the book ends with a Central Asian torture scene with said CEO.

== See also ==
- Turkey-United States relations
- Valley of the Wolves Iraq, a 2006 Turkish film also featuring a Turkish-U.S. conflict
