= Tiféret Israel Synagogue =

Orthodox synagogue in Caracas, Venezuela

- Hebrew: בית הכנסת תפארת ישראל; Spanish: Sinagoga Tiféret Israel
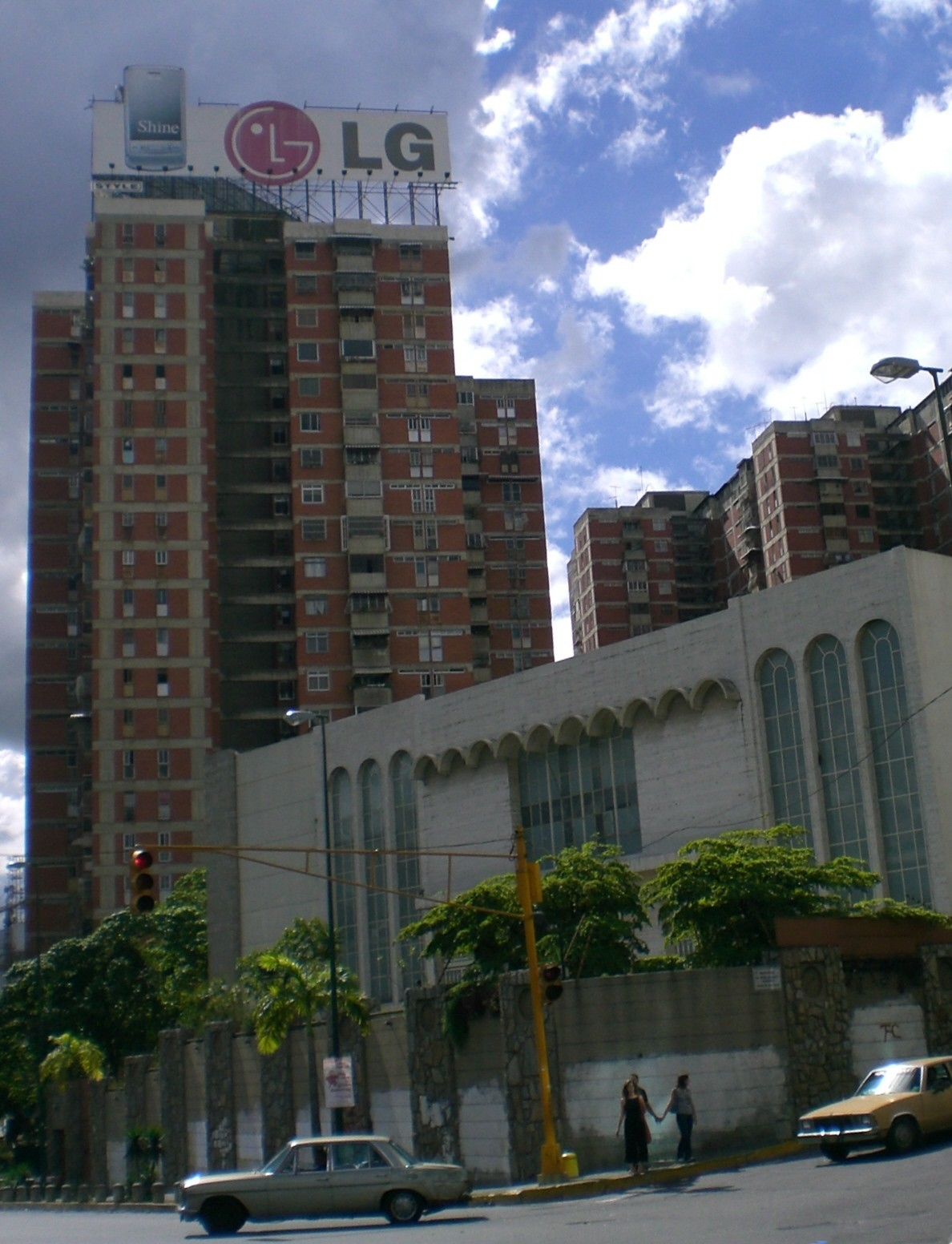
- The synagogue and head office of the Israelite Association of Venezuela, in 2007

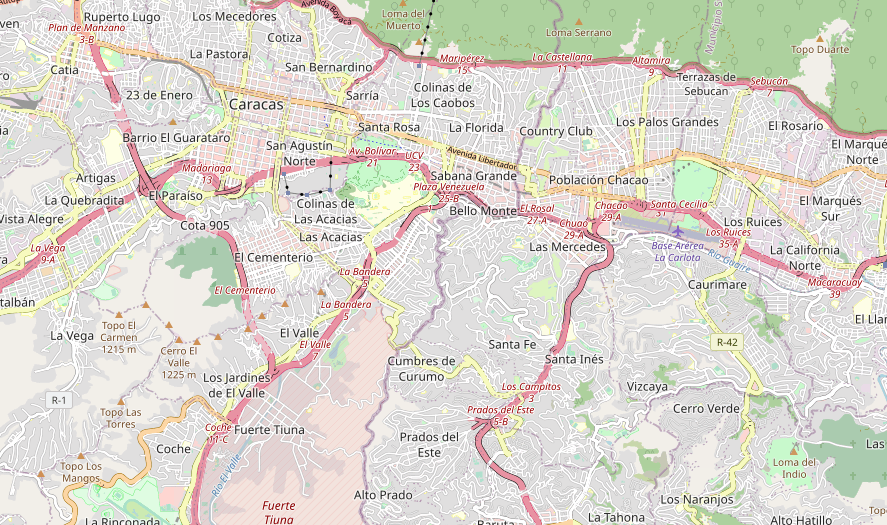
- Location of the synagogue in Caracas

Religion
- Affiliation: Orthodox Judaism
- Rite: Nusach Sefard
- Ecclesiastical or organizational status: Synagogue
- Ownership: Israelite Association of Venezuela
- Status: Active

Location
- Location: El Recreo, Plaza Venezuela, Caracas
- Country: Venezuela
- Interactive map of Tiféret Israel Synagogue
- Coordinates: 10°29′56″N 66°53′18″W

Architecture
- Groundbreaking: 1956
- Completed: 1963

The Tiféret Israel Synagogue (Hebrew: בית הכנסת תפארת ישראל; Spanish: Sinagoga Tiféret Israel) is a Jewish synagogue located in El Recreo, close to Plaza Venezuela in Caracas, capital of Venezuela. It is also the headquarters of the Israelite Association of Venezuela.

== History ==
In 1954, the Sephardic Jewish community of Caracas reached an agreement to buy private land in Maripérez, Caracas, in order to build a synagogue to replace the one located in the El Conde area, which had to be demolished as part of the construction of the Bolivar Avenue, the main highway during that time. Finally in 1956 the first stone was laid; the synagogue was formally inaugurated and opened to the public in 1963, and since then has served as a religious temple for the Jewish community of Caracas.

=== 2009 attack ===
In late January 2009, the synagogue was badly damaged in a well-organized attack, following escalating tensions between the Israeli and Venezuelan governments after the Gaza–Israel conflict of 2008–2009. The attack followed an article inciting antisemitic violence, which appeared (later removed, and replaced by an apology) on a government website. An armed gang consisting of 15 unidentified men broke into the synagogue, tied and gagged security guards and occupied the building for several hours. Antisemitic and anti-Israeli graffiti was daubed on the walls and the synagogue office and Holy Ark were ransacked. They also called for Jews to be expelled from the country. Venezuela's Foreign Minister Nicolas Maduro condemned the act as a "criminal act of vandalism". The Information Minister Jesse Chacón also condemned the attack and denied it had any connection with the government. Three former policemen and three civilians were found guilty and sentenced to ten years in jail.

== See also ==
- History of the Jews in Venezuela
- List of synagogues in Venezuela
