= Israelite Association of Venezuela =

Jewish organization in Venezuela

- Asociación Israelita de Venezuela
- Formation: c. 1920; 106 years ago
- Type: Nonprofit
- Purpose: Sephardic Judaism
- Headquarters: Tiféret Israel Synagogue building
- Location: Caracas, Venezuela
- Coordinates: 10°29′56″N 66°53′18″W
- Region served: Venezuela
- Members: 800 families (undated)

The Israelite Association of Venezuela (Spanish: Asociación Israelita de Venezuela), known as Tiferet Israel, is an association for Sephardic Jews living in Venezuela. Founded in the 1920s in Caracas, it is the oldest surviving Jewish organization in Venezuela.

The association supports two synagogues, the Tiféret Israel Synagogue and the Bet-El Synagogue, both in Caracas. The association counts approximately 800 families among its members.

The head office of the association is located in the same building as the Tiféret Israel Synagogue. The building was subject to an antisemitic attack in 2009.

== Gallery ==
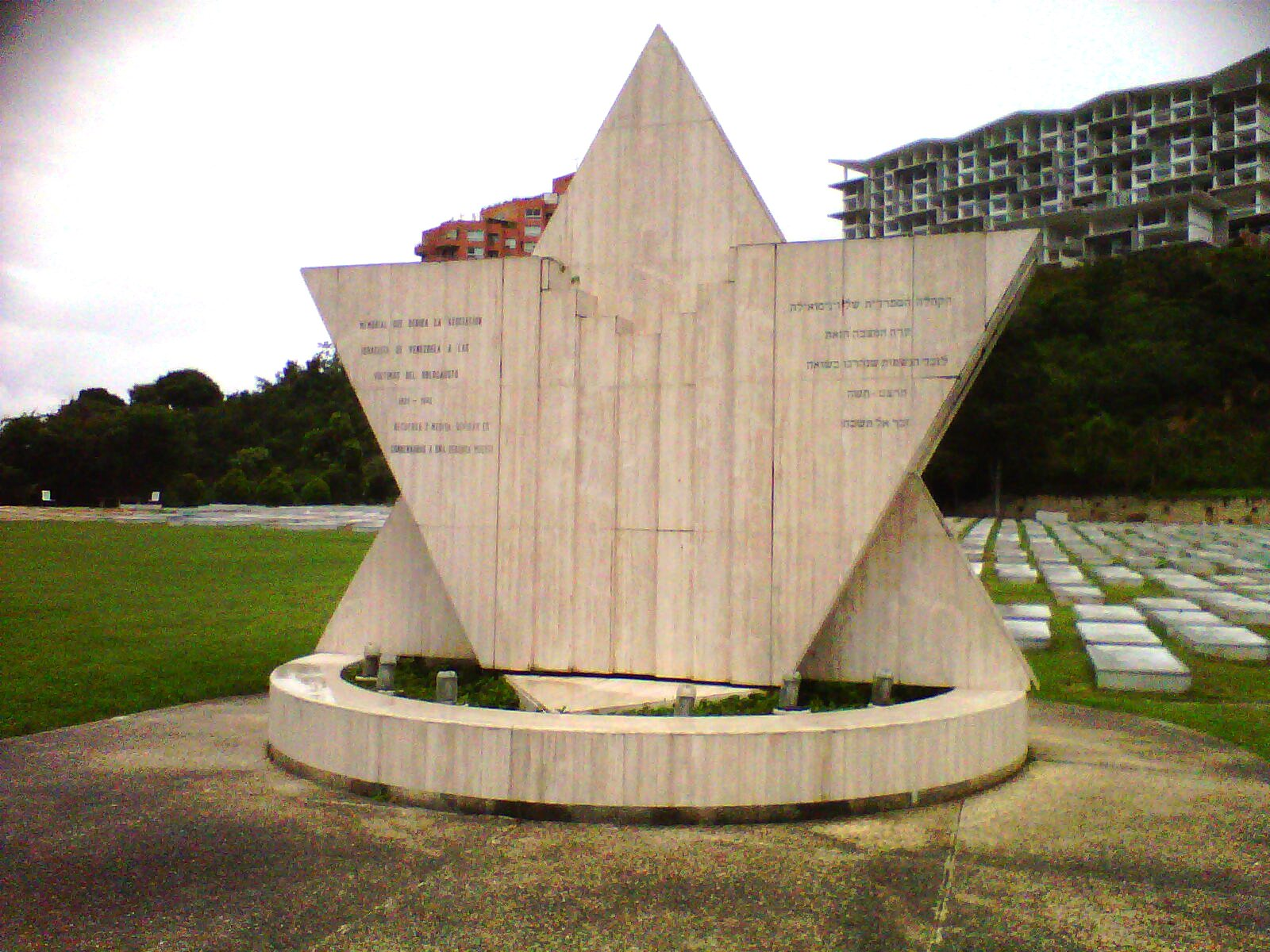
Holocaust Memorial in Caracas

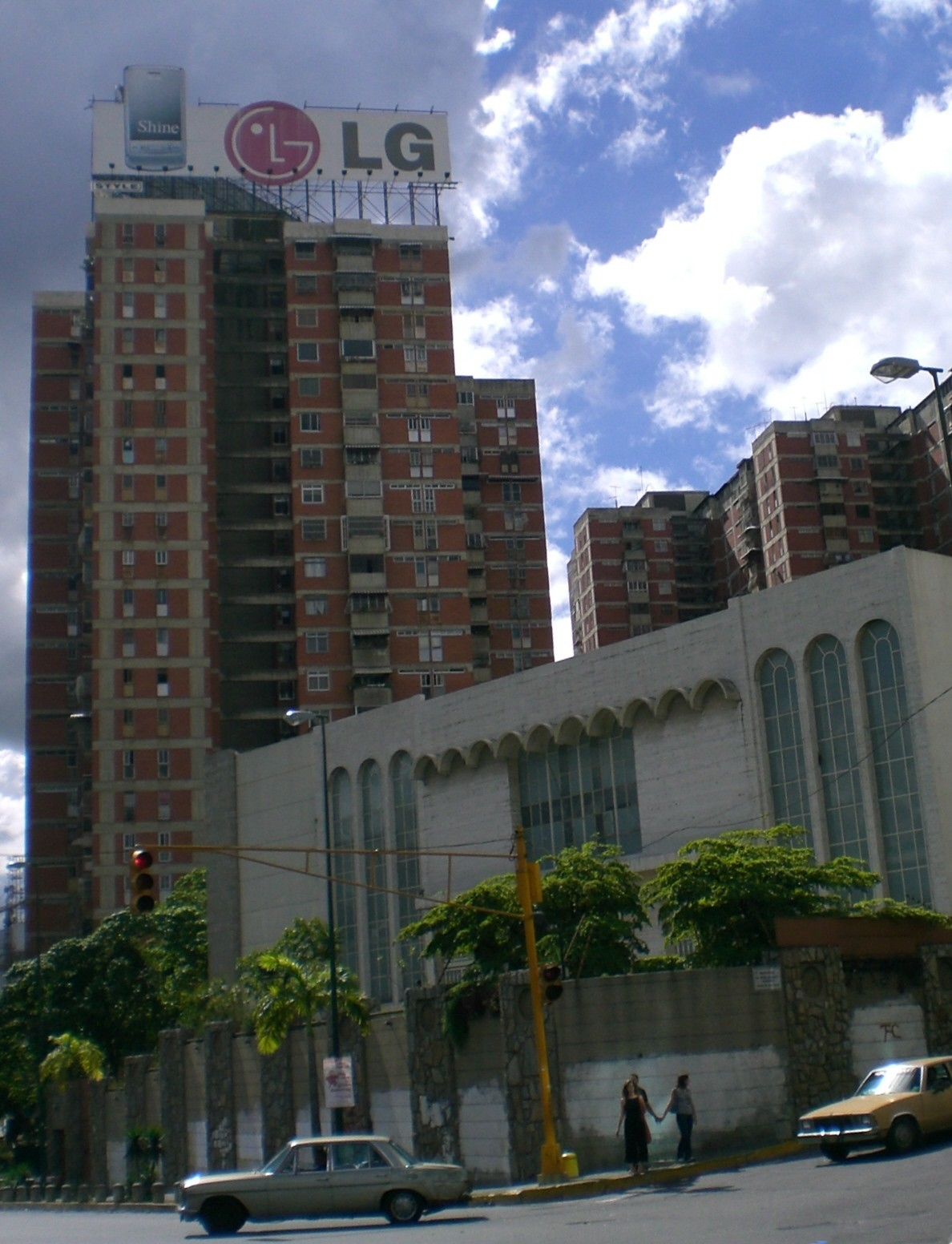
Tiféret Israel Synagogue, the main synagogue of the association

== See also ==
- History of the Jews in Venezuela
- List of synagogues in Venezuela
