= Mérida, Mérida =

Capital of the Venezuelan state of Mérida

Mérida
- City
- Santiago de los Caballeros de Mérida
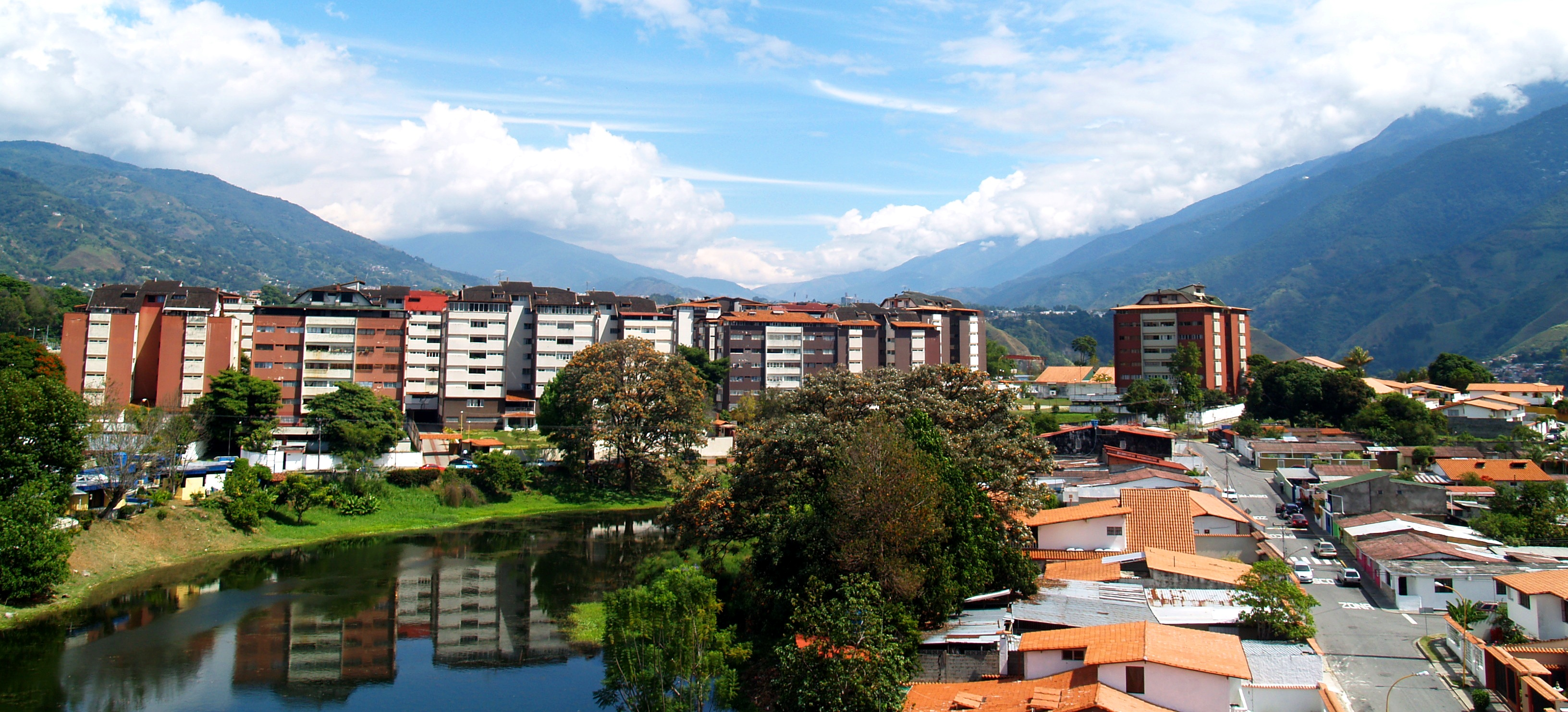
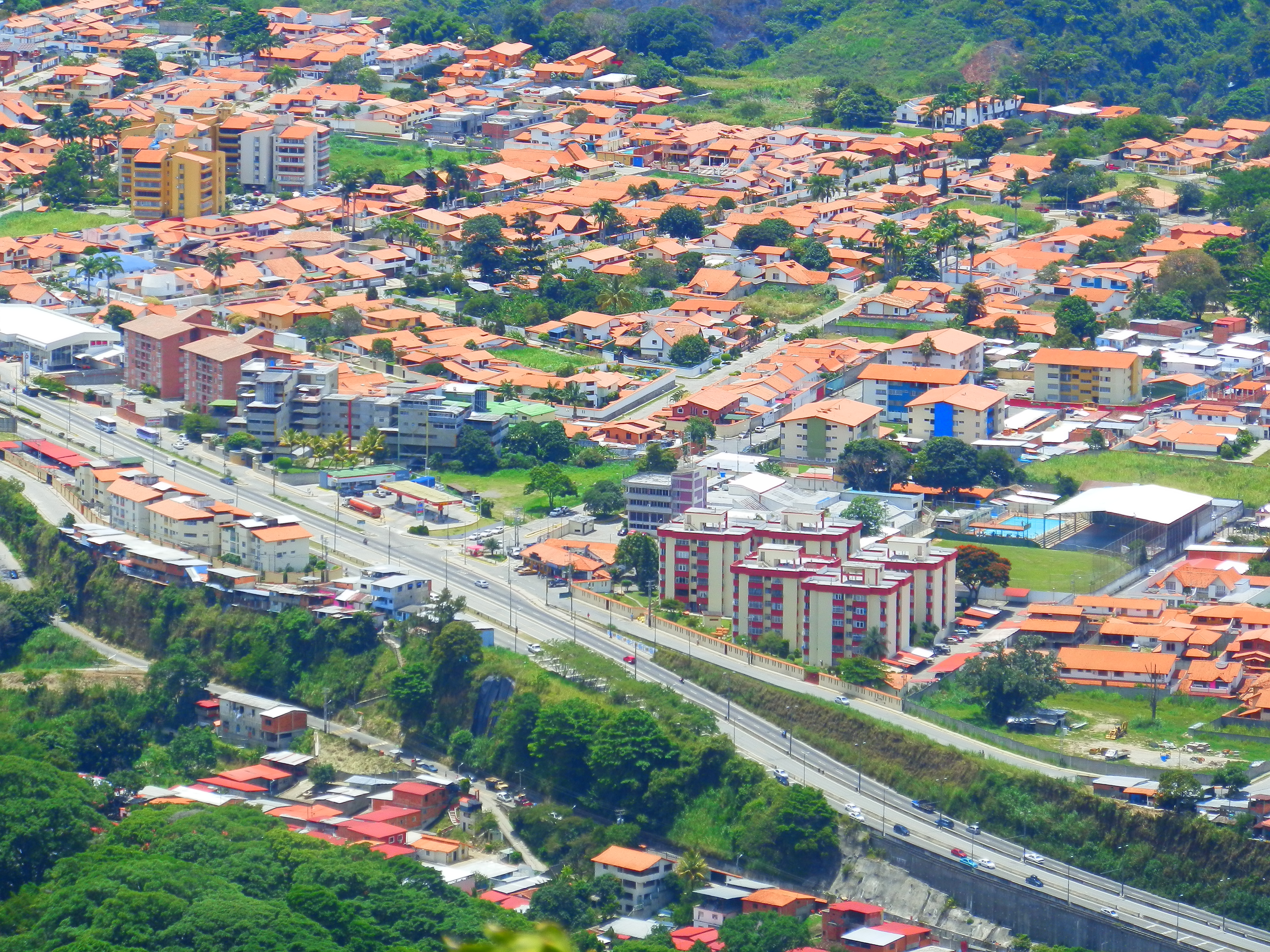
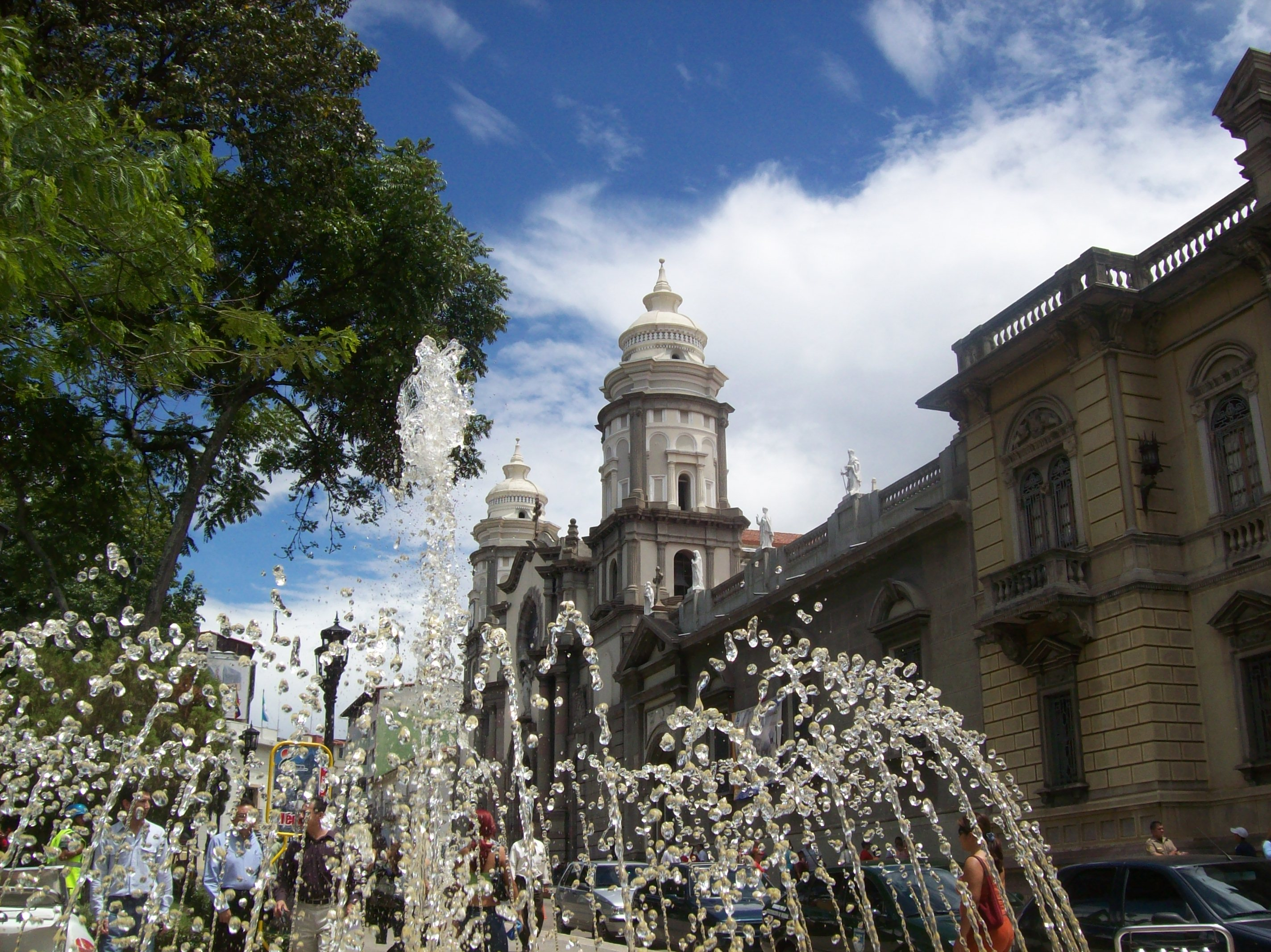
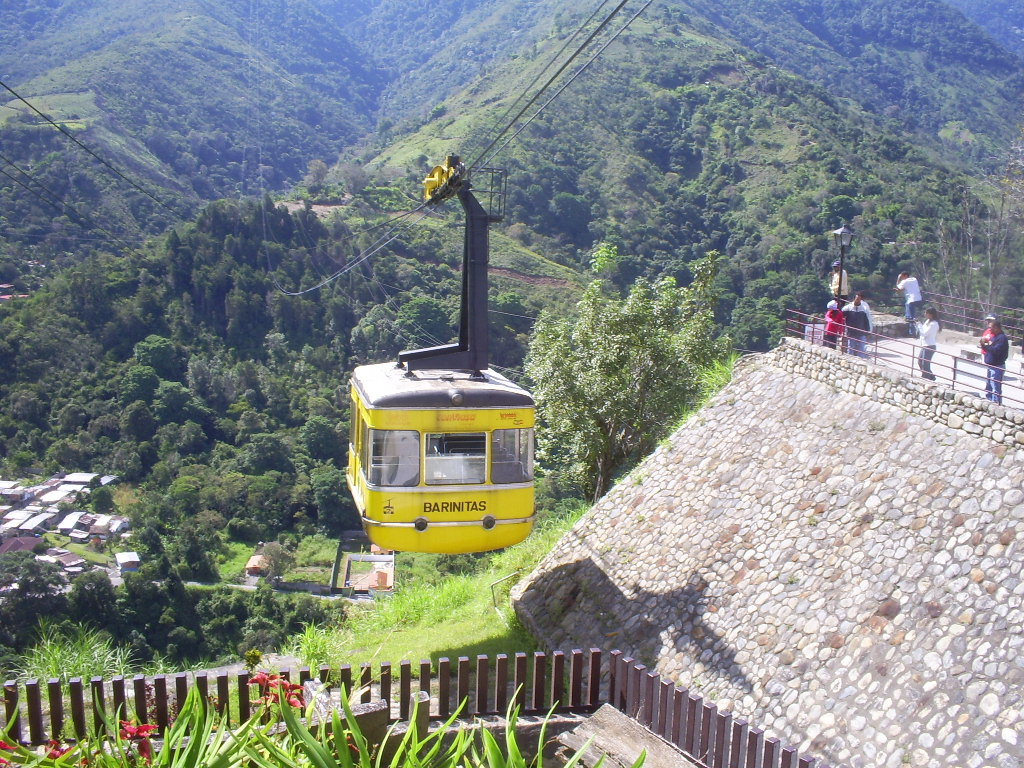
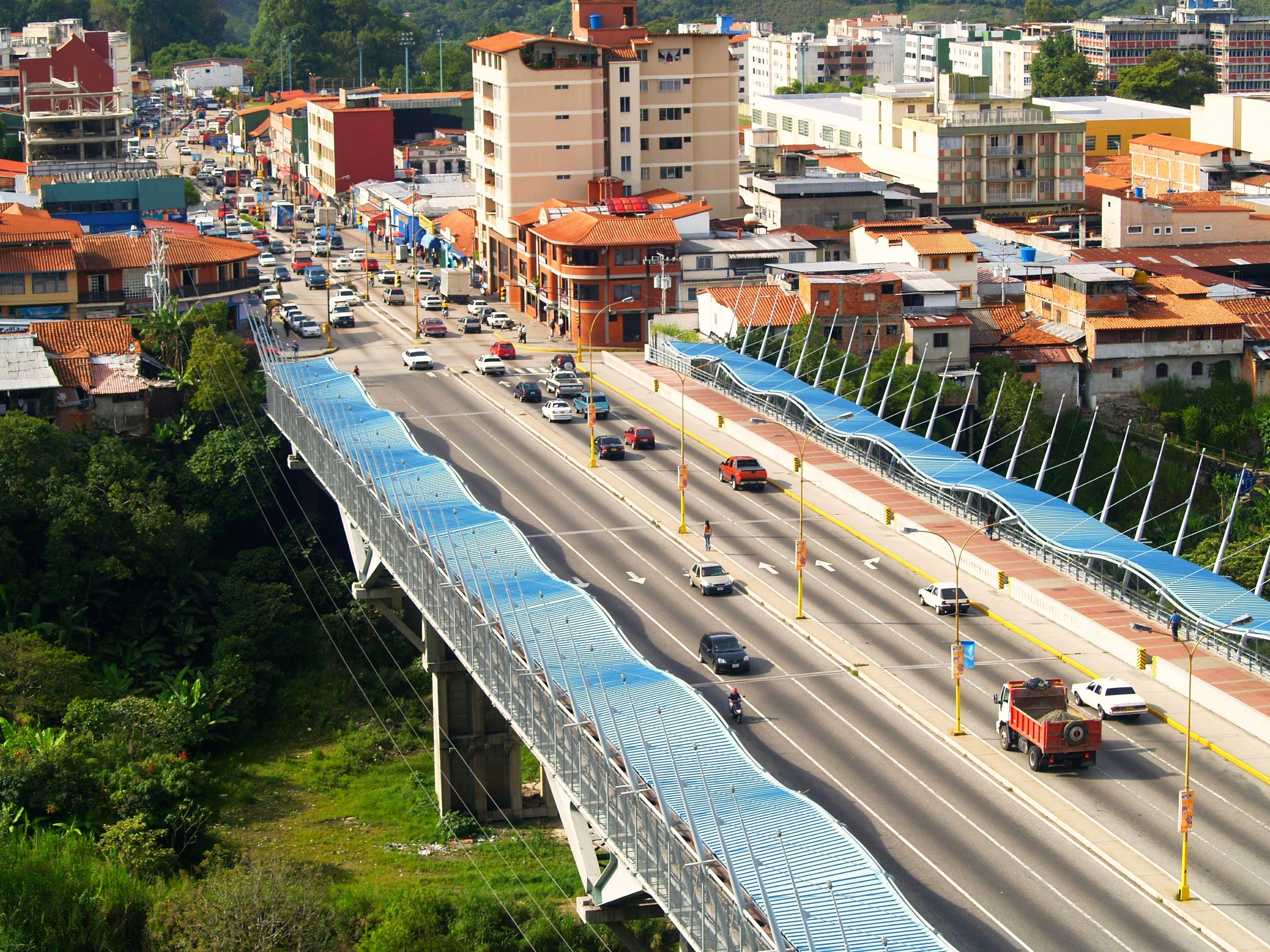
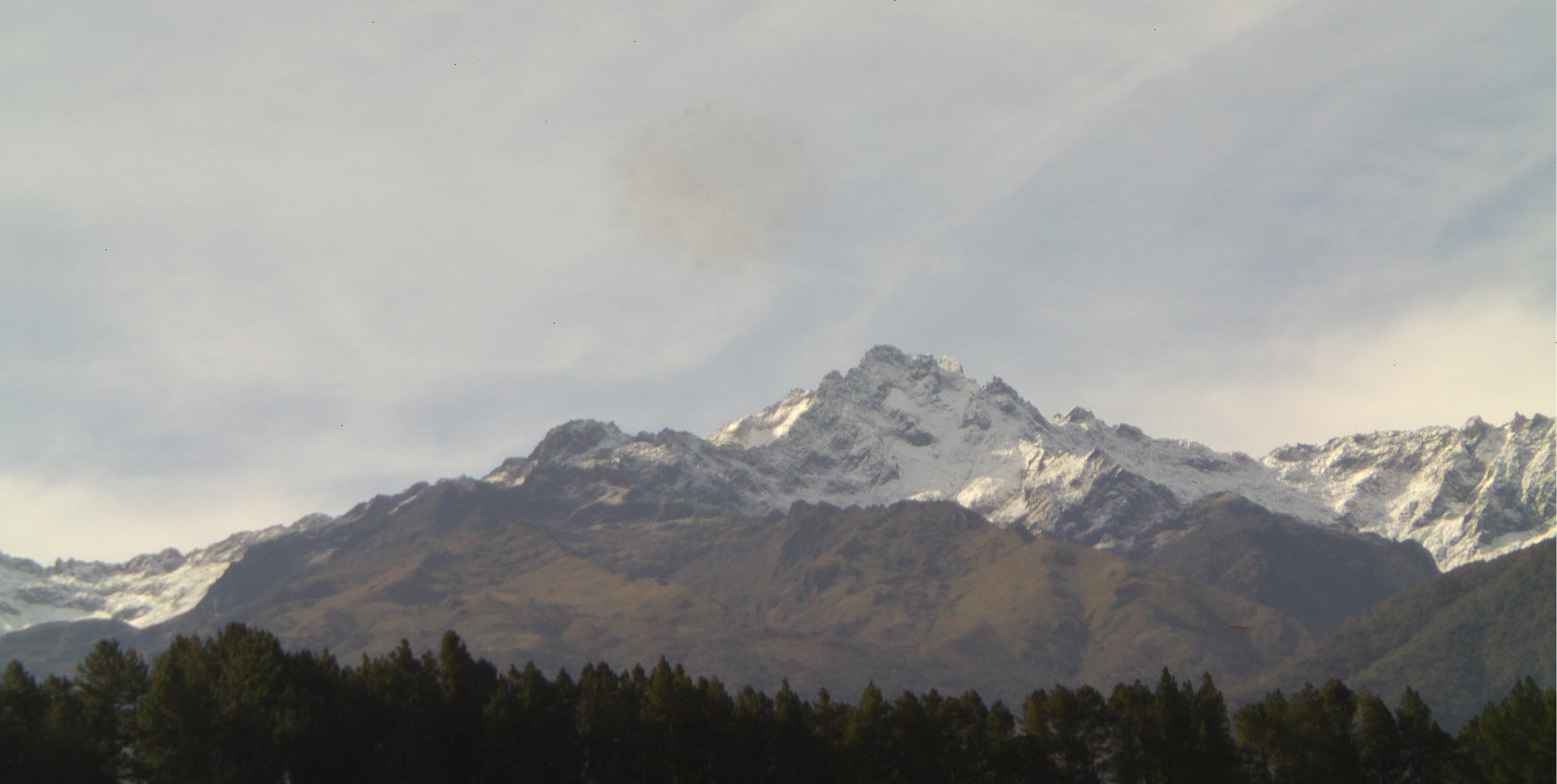
- Top: Residential area on the Río Albarregas; Second: View of southern Zumba area, Mérida Cathedral with Arzobispal Palace; Third: Cable car near La Montana, Campo Elías Viaduct; Bottom: View of Pico Bolívar

- Flag Coat of arms
- Nickname: Ciudad de los Caballeros (City of Gentlemen)
- Motto: Non potest civitas abscondi supra montem posita (A city on a hill cannot be hidden Matthew 5:14)
- Location within Venezuela
- Coordinates: 8°36′N 71°9′W
- Country: Venezuela
- State: Mérida
- Municipalities: Libertador
- Founded: October 9, 1558

Government
  - Mayor: Nelson Alvarez (PSUV)

Area
  - City: 59.39 km^{2} (22.93 sq mi)
- Elevation: 1,630 m (5,350 ft)

Population (2019)
  - City: 289,800
  - Density: 4,880/km^{2} (12,640/sq mi)
  - Metro: 392,751
  - Demonym: Merideño(a)
- Time zone: UTC−4 (VET)
- Postal code: 5101
- Area code: 274
- Climate: Am
- Website: http://www.merida.com.ve/

Mérida, officially known as Santiago de los Caballeros de Mérida, is the capital of the municipality of Libertador and the state of Mérida, and is one of the main cities of the Venezuelan Andes. It was founded in 1558 by Captain Juan Rodríguez Suárez, forming part of Nueva Granada, but later became part of the Captaincy General of Venezuela and played an active role in the War of Independence.

The capital city's population is 199,878 inhabitants, and the metropolitan area (including the municipalities of Libertador, Campo Elías, Sucre, and Santos Marquina) reaches 392,751 people (2011 census). The city accounts for 24% of the total population of Mérida State. It is home to the University of Los Andes and the Archdiocese of Mérida. It also has the highest and longest cable car in the world. It is the largest student and tourist center of western Venezuela. The mass transit system (Trolebús Mérida) is available as a means of tourist transport.

This city sits on a plateau nestled in the valley of the Chama River, which runs from end to end. The city of Mérida is located at an altitude of 1,600 metres (5,200 feet). Visible from the city is the country's highest summit Pico Bolívar, with an altitude of 4,981 metres (16,342 feet).

== History ==
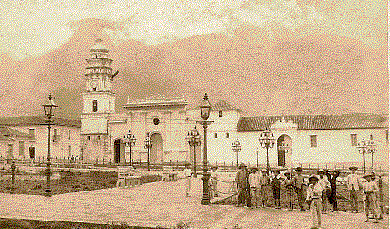
The city of Mérida in 1899

Mérida was founded by Juan Rodríguez Suárez on October 9, 1558, in one of the Pamplonian mining expeditions he led. The first settlement of Mérida was not the current one but 30 kilometres (19 miles) to the south, in Xamú, where today stands Lagunillas. Nevertheless, in November 1559, Juan de Maldonado moved the settlement to nearby El Punto (presently the Zumba area), because of constant confrontations with the native neighbours.

Rodríguez Suárez's foundation had not been authorized by the New Granadian Authorities, so in 1560 they sent Juan de Maldonado to arrest Juan Rodríguez and regularize the new city. On June 24 Maldonado moved Mérida to its present location on the plateau and rechristened it as Santiago de los Caballeros. The city then came to be governed by the corregimiento of Tunja until 1607, when it became itself a corregimiento of the Audiencia of Santa Fe.

In 1622, Mérida became the capital of the Province of Mérida, whose chief official established his residence there. The city and territory were part of New Granada until 1777, when it was integrated into the Captaincy of Venezuela.

The city was elevated to the status of an episcopal see in 1785. This led to the creation of a seminary, which in 1811 became the University of the Andes.

=== Etymology ===
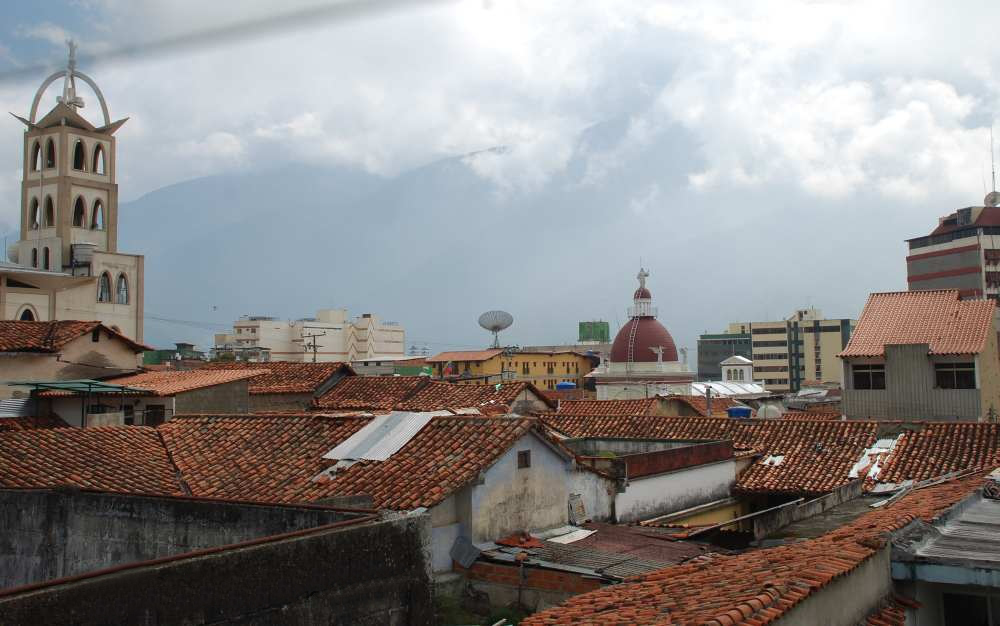
Mérida, the highland and student town of Venezuela

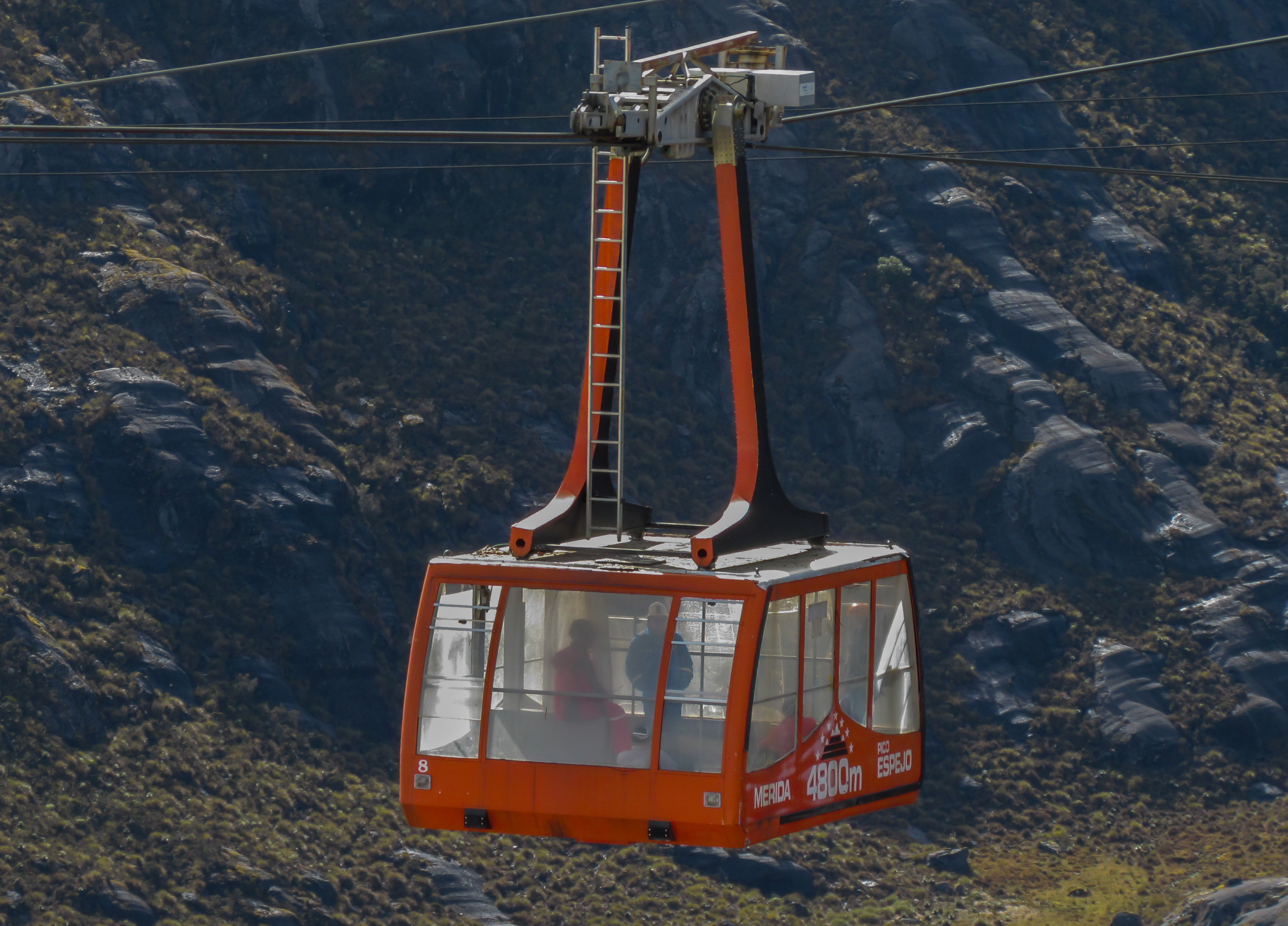
The Mérida cable car is the highest and largest cable car in the world.

The city was named by the founder Juan Rodríguez Suárez, who called it so in honor of his hometown of Mérida in Extremadura, Spain.

However, Juan de Maldonado renamed it as San Juan de las Nieves. In 1559 the name changed again, opting this time for Santiago de los Caballeros. Gradually, it was adopting the name of Santiago de los Caballeros de Mérida, combining the variants that had been appointed to the city until then.

The word Mérida comes from the Latin "emérita", from Emeritus, one who has merit, which also references to veteran Roman soldiers who were discharged from the army after completion of their mandatory service commitment. Another feature common to both the Spanish and the Venezuelan Méridas is that in both cities, there is a tributary of the main river with the name Albarregas.

== Geography ==
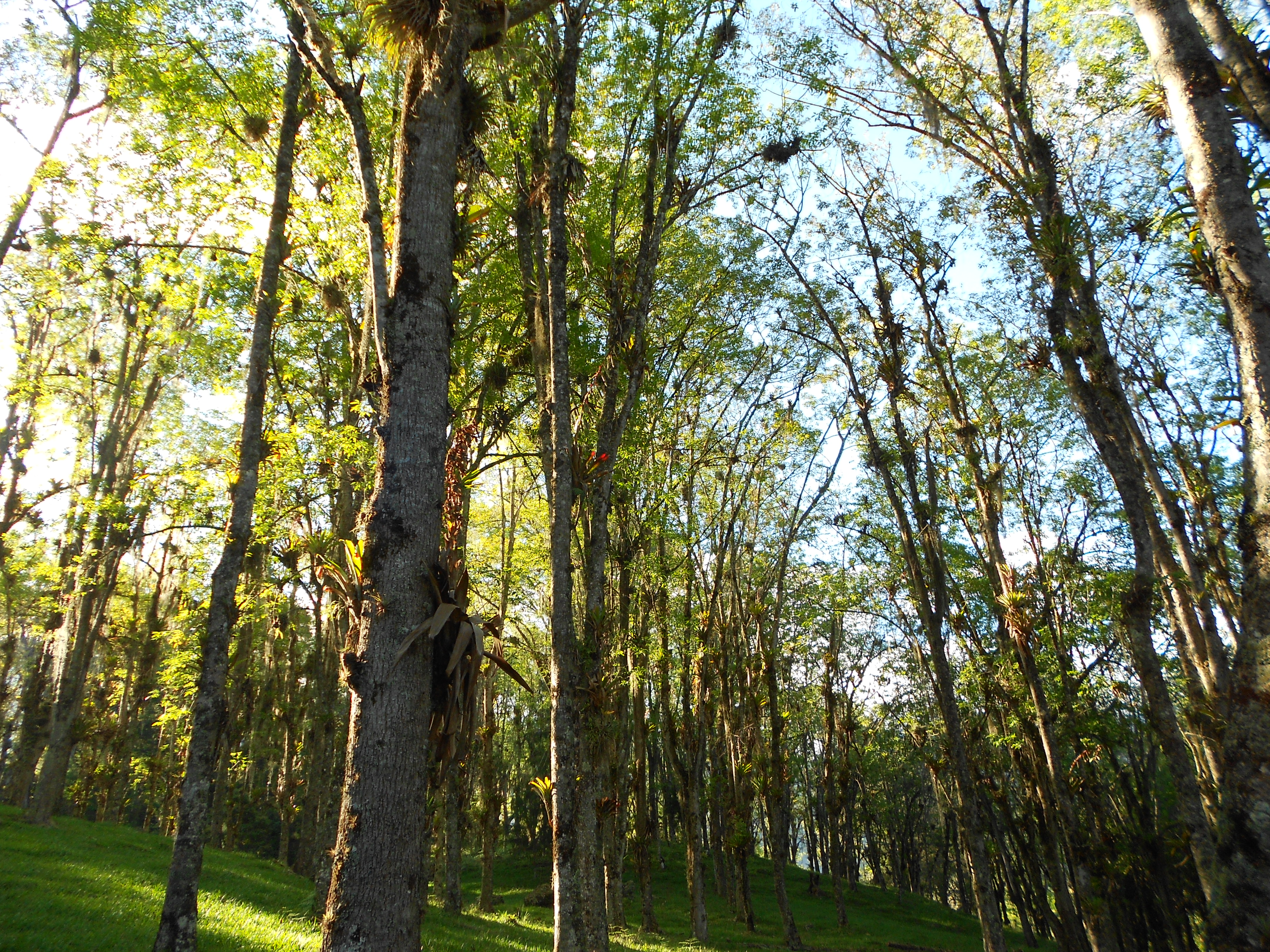
El Valle forest in Mérida

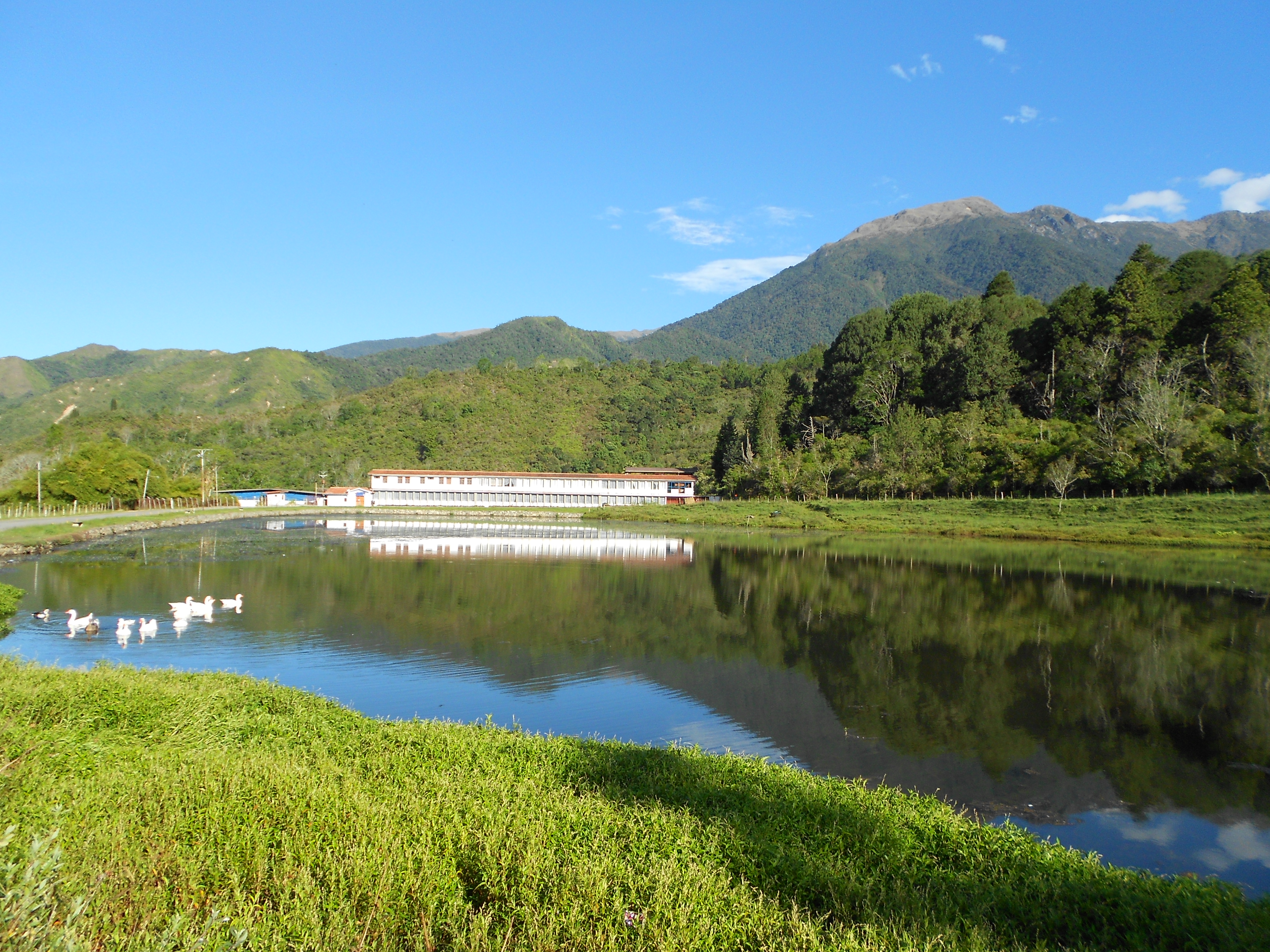
Typical landscape

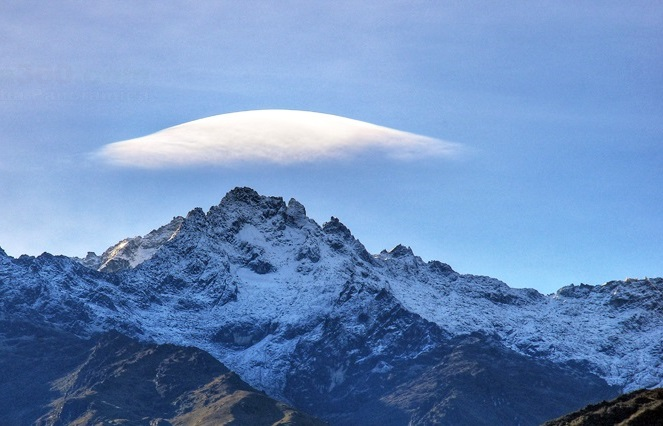
Pico Bolívar

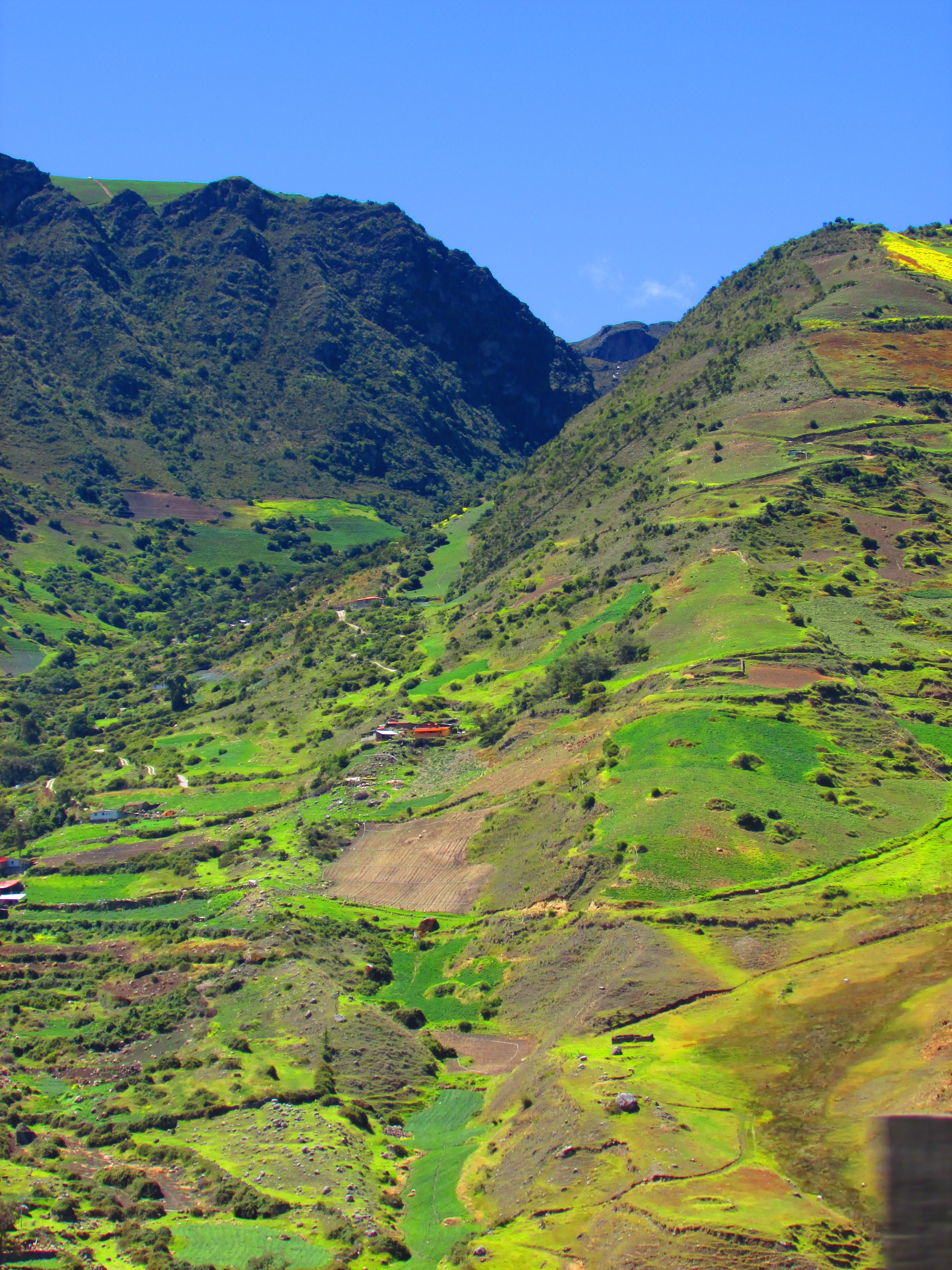
Mérida lies within a valley, with many colonial towns adjacent.

The city is located in the center of the Venezuelan Andes, in a wide plain in the valley of the Chama River, between the Sierra Nevada de Mérida to the southeast and the Sierra La Culata to the northwest. The old quarter of the city is on the alluvial plain known as Tatuy.

Mérida has four principal rivers and some smaller seasonal streams in the less urbanized parts of the city, these last ones have a significant water flow only in times of heavy precipitation. The most important river is the Chama, followed by the Albarregas, which cross the plain and divide it into two parts: the Banda Occidental (west bank) and the Banda Oriental (east bank). These two rivers run from one end of the city to the other. The other two principal rivers are the Mucujún and the Milla, which flow into the Chama and Albarregas. In the lower part of the city is found the La Rosa lake, one of some 200 lakes in Mérida State.

In the center of the city the terrain, located on a plain, is almost flat. Nonetheless, there is an average incline of 3 to 7 degrees, which causes a difference in altitude between the high and low parts of the city of more than 400 m (1,300 ft), the average being 1,630 m (5,350 ft) above sea level at the Plaza Bolívar. However, the areas surrounding the city are rough and uneven, situated in the valleys formed by the Chama and Albarregas rivers and the Sierra Nevada and Sierra de La Culata ranges.

The valley in which the city is located was formed approximately 40 to 60 million years ago with the creation of the Venezuelan Andes and its continuous erosion by the area's water systems. Its soils consist of alluvial sediment and clay. Below the city runs the major tectonic fault in the western part of the country, the Boconó fault, which forms part of the South American Plate.

The vegetation in the interior of the city consists of medium to tall trees, and ferns (Pteridophyte), located mainly near the basin of the Albarregas river. On the outskirts of Mérida, one finds non-urbanized areas, where sub-mountainous and seasonal jungle vegetation predominates. On the other hand, vast coniferous forests extend toward the south, where they were planted some years ago. Toward the north and east, one finds cloud forests.

Significant among the local fauna are important populations of certain small and medium-sized birds such as hummingbirds and parrots (Psittacidae), spread particularly to the south of the city.

=== Climate ===
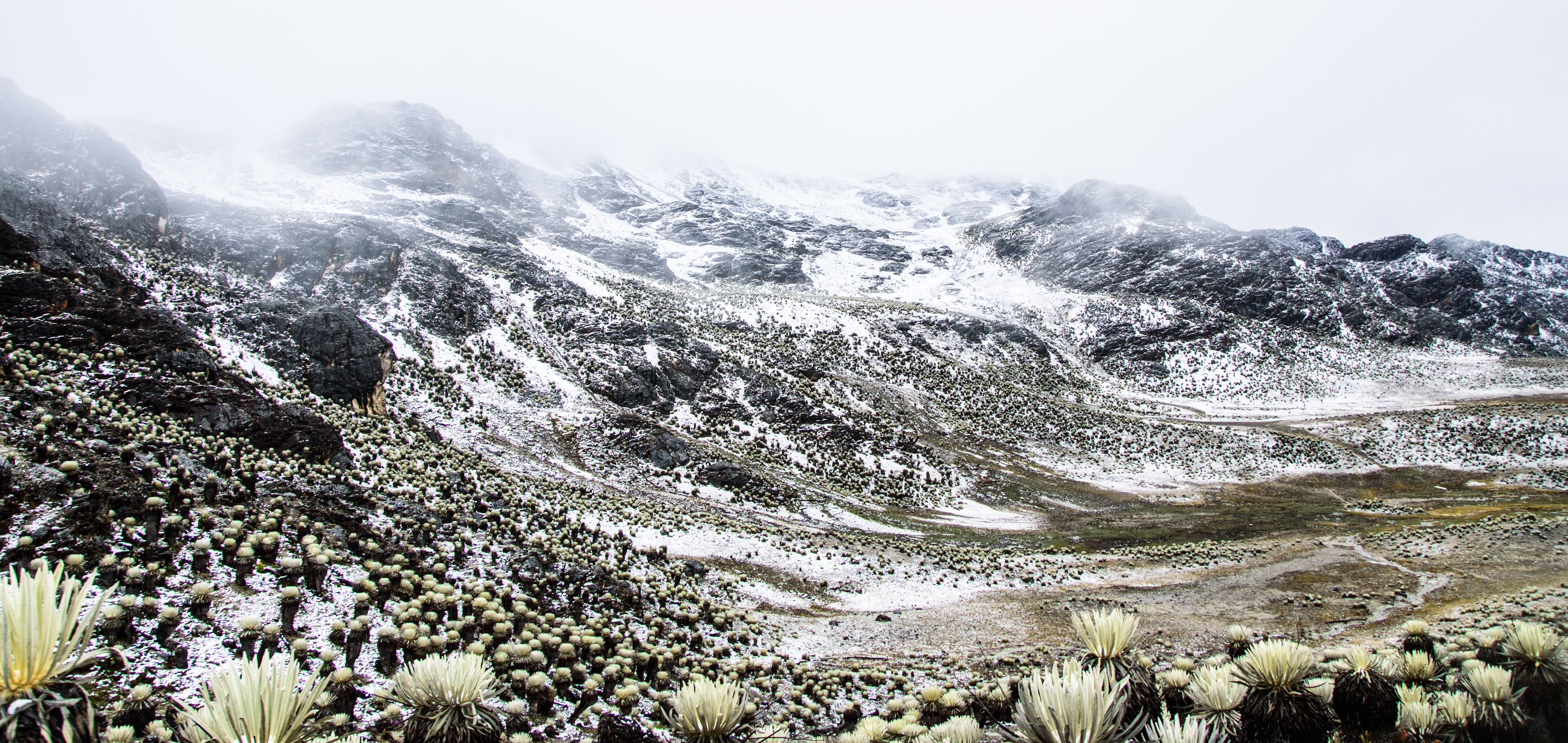
Mountains in Mifafí Valley

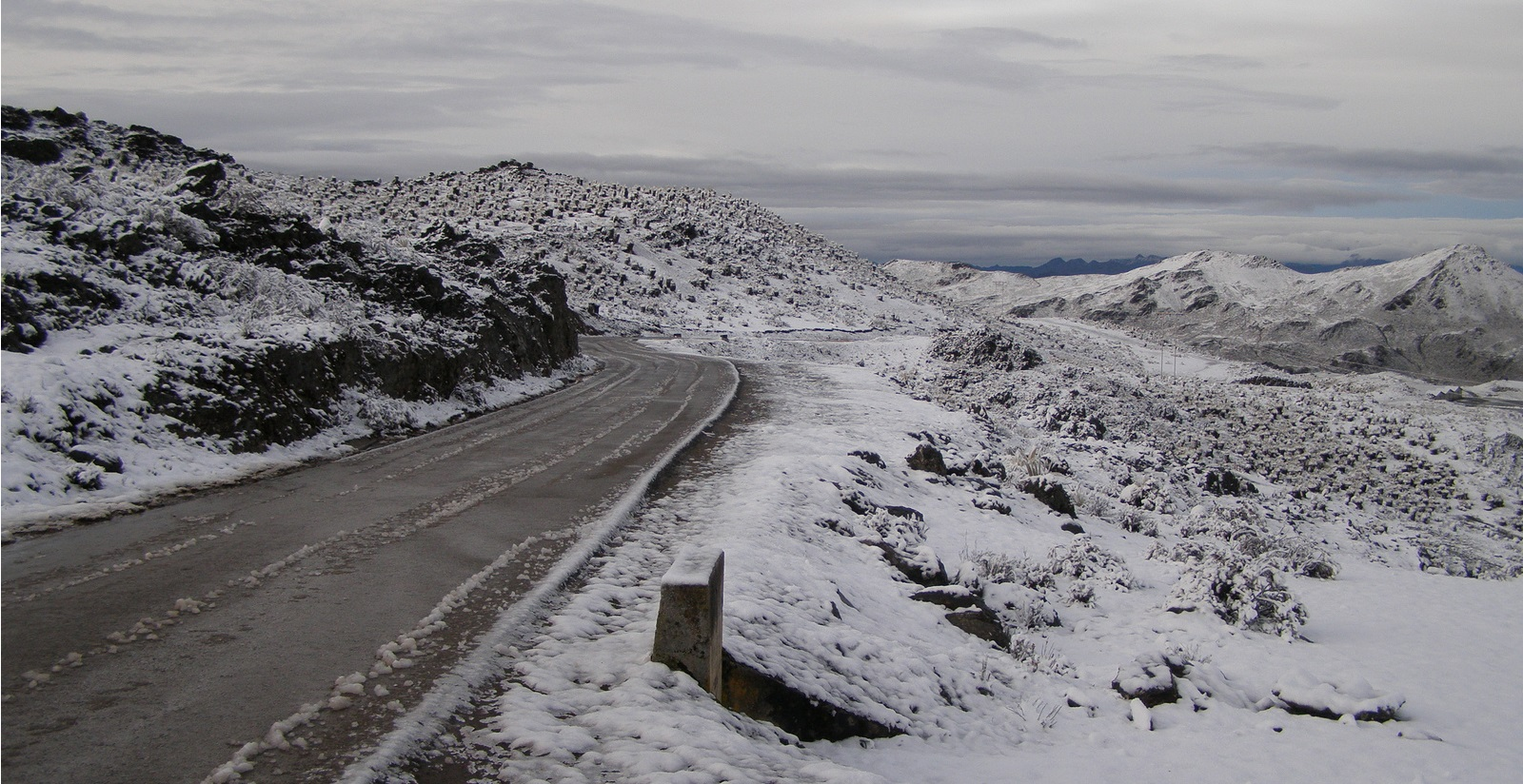
Snowy road to Pico El Águila

Mérida features a tropical monsoon climate (Köppen: Am), with cooler temperatures than other cities in Venezuela, with dry winters. Though the emission greenhouse gases has caused a rise in temperatures, this has been less, in relative terms, than in other important cities in Venezuela, with readings that vary between 19 °C and 24 °C (75 °F), with an overall average of 22 °C (72 °F). Precipitation is heavy during the rainy season, from April to November, though the city does receive more sunshine than most cities in the Colombian Andes, since the valley is too narrow for fog to accumulate.

Venezuela is situated in an inter-tropical zone, so that there is very little temperature variance over the course of a year. The same is true in Mérida—the temperatures recorded in August are normally comparable to those measured under comparable conditions in broad daylight in January.

On the other hand, given Mérida's location in the interior of the country, far from the maritime coasts and the influence of the ocean, and its high altitude, the temperature variance over the course of a day is relatively high. Between day and night a difference of more than 10 °C (18 °F) can be observed; this difference sometimes reaches more than 20 °C (36 °F). The maximums are reached during the day, and are usually around 24 °C (75 °F), but on rare occasions exceed 30 °C (86 °F). The lower limit of daytime temperatures tends to be around 14 °C (57 °F).

Snow can be seen in some Mérida peaks, such as Pico El Águila.

Climate data for Mérida 1,599 m (5,246 ft) 1991–2020 normals, extremes 1961–2020
Month	Jan	Feb	Mar	Apr	May	Jun	Jul	Aug	Sep	Oct	Nov	Dec	Year
Record high °C (°F)	30.1 (86.2)	34.1 (93.4)	31.3 (88.3)	31.7 (89.1)	30.8 (87.4)	31.0 (87.8)	33.8 (92.8)	31.7 (89.1)	32.0 (89.6)	32.0 (89.6)	30.6 (87.1)	28.9 (84.0)	34.1 (93.4)
Mean daily maximum °C (°F)	26.1 (79.0)	26.8 (80.2)	26.7 (80.1)	26.5 (79.7)	26.7 (80.1)	26.3 (79.3)	26.4 (79.5)	27.1 (80.8)	27.1 (80.8)	26.4 (79.5)	25.9 (78.6)	25.9 (78.6)	26.5 (79.7)
Daily mean °C (°F)	19.1 (66.4)	19.6 (67.3)	20.1 (68.2)	20.3 (68.5)	20.5 (68.9)	20.2 (68.4)	20.0 (68.0)	20.4 (68.7)	20.3 (68.5)	19.9 (67.8)	19.6 (67.3)	19.3 (66.7)	19.9 (67.8)
Mean daily minimum °C (°F)	14.9 (58.8)	15.3 (59.5)	16.2 (61.2)	16.9 (62.4)	17.0 (62.6)	16.6 (61.9)	16.3 (61.3)	16.5 (61.7)	16.5 (61.7)	16.6 (61.9)	16.4 (61.5)	15.5 (59.9)	16.2 (61.2)
Record low °C (°F)	10.3 (50.5)	10.3 (50.5)	12.2 (54.0)	12.8 (55.0)	13.7 (56.7)	10.2 (50.4)	10.0 (50.0)	12.8 (55.0)	6.4 (43.5)	13.4 (56.1)	12.5 (54.5)	10.0 (50.0)	6.4 (43.5)
Average precipitation mm (inches)	31.8 (1.25)	37.3 (1.47)	78.3 (3.08)	169.3 (6.67)	192.3 (7.57)	155.3 (6.11)	121.1 (4.77)	129.2 (5.09)	188.8 (7.43)	204.9 (8.07)	156.4 (6.16)	70.8 (2.79)	1,535.5 (60.45)
Average precipitation days (≥ 1.0 mm)	5.6	5.3	9.1	14.9	16.8	16.3	15.6	15.0	16.3	17.1	14.0	8.1	154.1
Average relative humidity (%)	71.5	71.0	72.0	75.5	76.0	76.0	74.0	73.5	73.5	76.0	76.5	73.5	74.1
Mean monthly sunshine hours	257.3	224.0	226.3	177.0	192.2	180.0	213.9	213.9	201.0	192.2	198.0	235.6	2,511.4
Mean daily sunshine hours	8.3	8.0	7.3	5.9	6.2	6.0	6.9	6.9	6.7	6.2	6.6	7.6	6.9
Source 1: NOAA (sun 1961–1990)
Source 2: Instituto Nacional de Meteorología e Hidrología (humidity 1970–1998)

== Government ==
Mérida is the seat of the state and municipal governments, and is also home to the Governor and the Mayor's offices, the state legislature, and the regional offices of the judicial and electoral branches. Important representatives and governors are also taken to this city to meet at an annual voting session. Moreover, 13 of the 15 prefectures of the Libertador Municipality are located within the city.

Nowadays, politics have an important role among the general population, although to a lesser extent than in the larger urban centers, and the most important government positions, including Mayor and Governor, are held by members of the official party, the Fifth Republic Movement. Because of the great concentration of students, and the importance of the Universidad de Los Andes in local development, the positions of University Director and President of the Student Body of the University of The Andes are also of great importance within the local political scene; the first of these offices is currently filled by an opposition party member. Due to the recent suspension of the elections for President of the University Student Body, the city has seen an intense wave of protests that have left more than a dozen wounded.

In the 2004 Venezuelan recall referendum, the city of Mérida voted against the overall trend, as at least 60% of voters opposed the continuation of President Hugo Chávez's mandate. By contrast, the majority of the rest of the population of the state of Mérida voted in favor of Chávez.

=== City planning ===
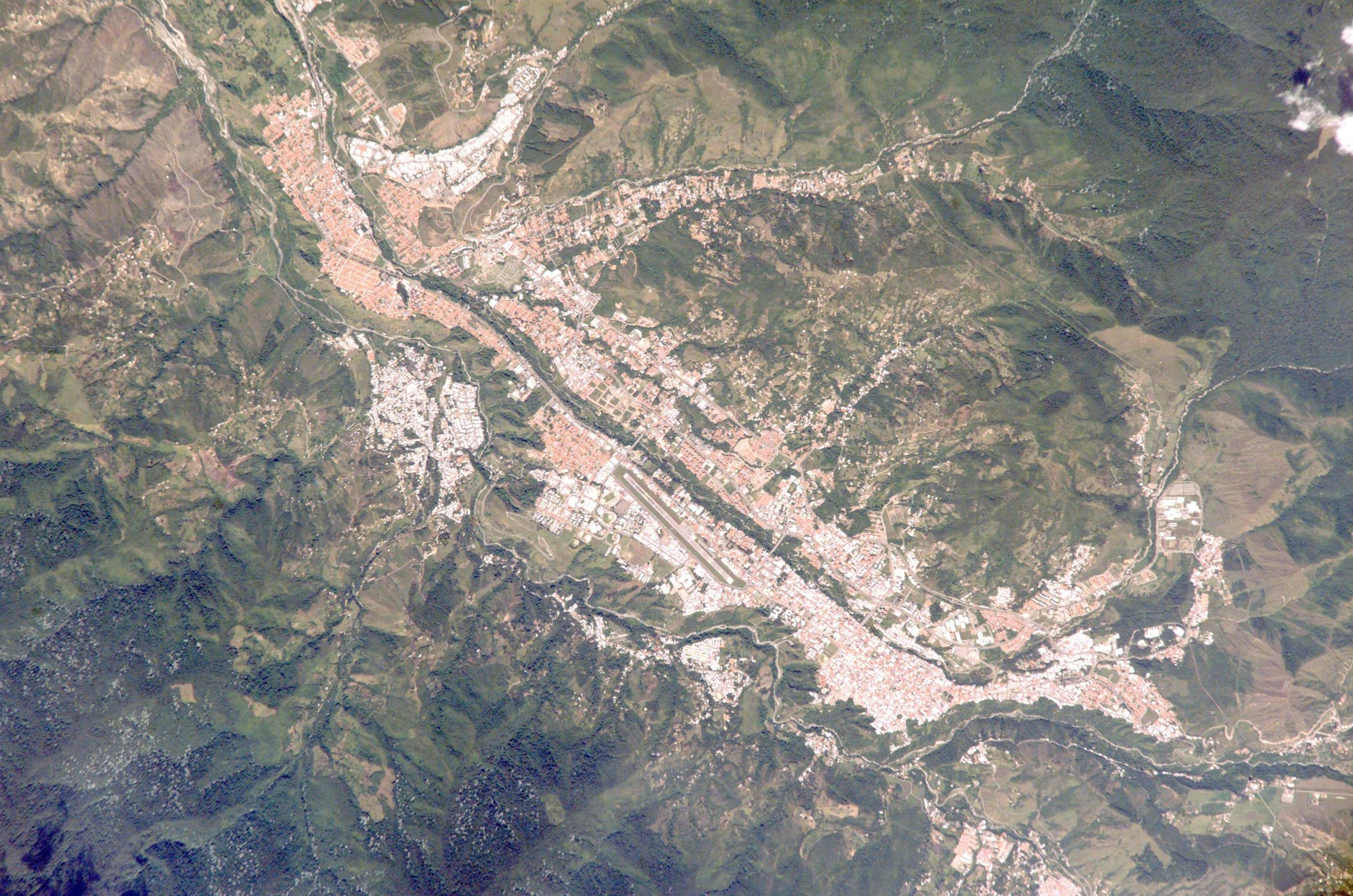
Aerial view of Mérida

Because of its location on a plateau, in a small valley, covering an area of some 10 to 15 km (6 to 9 mi) in length and between 1 and 3 km (2 mi) wide, the city now lacks additional space for urban development. Though its polygonal area covers some 60 square kilometres (23 sq mi), the city occupies a little over 25 square kilometres (10 sq mi), and the rest consists of less developed zones or areas of uneven terrain, such as mountains or hillsides.

For this reason, the city layout is unorganized, oriented only by the traffic axes constructed in decades past. The layout of the city center or "Old Quarter" is in the Spanish Colonial style, consisting of eight major avenues running east–west and forty streets running north–south, creating blocks of 50 to 100 metres (160 to 330 feet) per side.

Historically, Mérida has been characterized by less pronounced differences between socio-economic classes and for its high quality of life. Recent years, however, owing to the economic situation confronting the country, have seen a significant increase in slums in the hills and outskirts of the city.

The southeastern part of the city, historically the headquarters of the large Haciendas that produced sugar cane, has for several decades undergone major urban development, consisting principally of single-family dwellings, and has grown almost to the point of joining with the city of Ejido, a bedroom community. Ejido currently extends to within less than 2 km (1 mi) of the border of Mérida, and the two cities are linked by a large avenue that goes from the neighborhoods of downtown Mérida to the outskirts of Ejido. At this point, it turns into a highway, running to the city of El Vigía, thereby uniting Mérida's metropolitan area.

Despite the limited space available for development, Mérida has the largest proportion of green areas per capita in Venezuela, thanks to its many squares and public parks, the one surrounding the river Albarregas being particularly noteworthy. The School of Architecture of the University of the Andes puts into practice diverse proposals for creating areas protected from urban development, thereby reducing the impact of population growth on the environment.

=== Neighborhoods ===
There were only two neighborhoods in the city at the beginning of the 20th century. One of them was Casco Central (central quarter), located in the east bank of the plateau; which in turn was divided in various zones, identified according to the name of the local square within. The other neighborhood of the city was by the other side of the Albarregas river, in the west bank. It was known as La Otra Banda ("the other bank"). However, as a result of the Oil Boom, immigration and various other reasons, new neighborhoods appeared as years went by. The first to emerge were those near downtown. Then, due to the lack of real estate and in the search of quieter areas, neighborhoods were created far, at the time, from the city center. Some of these old spurs have now become part of the city. The following are the main neighborhoods of the city.

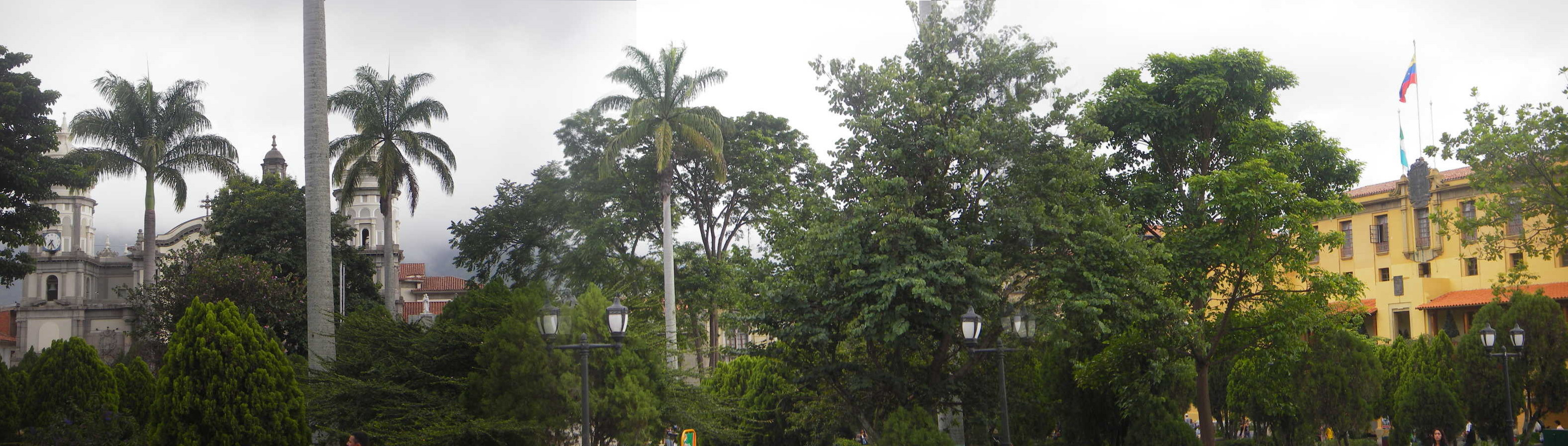
Panoramic view of the Bolívar Square next to the Government Palace and the Cathedral in the Casco Central

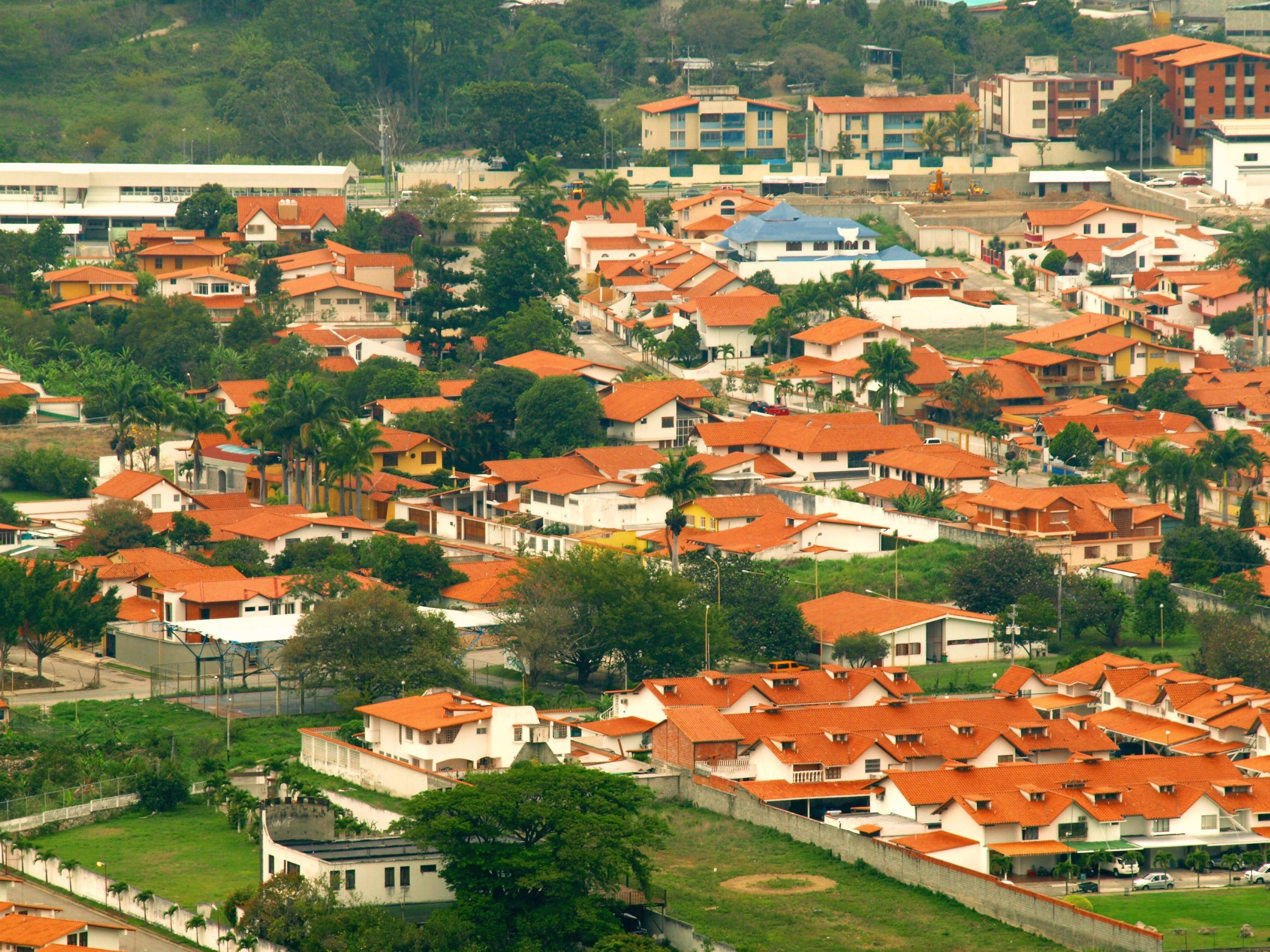
View of the neighborhood Convivencia Urbana Mérida

Belensate
Predominantly a higher-class neighborhood, it contains the largest and most luxurious houses in the city.
Casco Central
It comprises the historic city center. It is the main commercial, cultural, and urban area, containing most museums, libraries, churches, and retail shopping stores in Mérida.
Chama
It is a residential area for the middle class located in the vicinity of the Chama river. It is the lowest-altitude neighborhood in the city, situated about 200 metres (660 feet) lower than downtown. It will be connected to Casco Central via an aerial cableway planned as part of the Mérida trolleybus project.
Humboldt
It is a populated neighborhood to the southwest of the city, with increasing commercial development in recent years.
La Hechicera
Located at the northern end of the city, it contains the scientific and engineering buildings of the ULA, as well as the zoo and the botanical garden.
La Parroquia
This is the current name of the village formerly known as La Punta. It shares similarities with the Casco Central, with residential and commercial zones intermingled. It contains the second Bolívar Square in the city, as well as large public high schools and sporting facilities, such as the Metropolitan Stadium and the sport complex Cinco Águilas Blancas.
La Pedregosa
It is a long neighborhood located in the valley of La Pedregosa creek. It is mainly a residential zone. Although connected to the city, it is far enough from it that its development has increased in the last decades due to the availability of suitable real estate.
Los Curos
This is a popular neighborhood, almost exclusively residential, though it houses one of the few industrial zones in the city.
Pie del Llano
Situated in the middle of the city, it surrounds the airport and local branches of a number of government offices, as well as the city Mayor's office. It is a commercial and residential neighborhood with plenty of public parks.
Avenida 16/Campo de Oro/Santa Juana
It is a middle-class neighborhood located in the geographical center of the city. It borders the Tatuy mesa, which houses a number of car dealers and auto shops and, above all, the largest hospital of the city, the IHULA (Instituto Autónomo Hospital Universitario de los Andes)

Finally, the municipality is divided (for political purposes) into parishes; thirteen of the municipality's fifteen parishes are within the city.

== Demographics ==
PopulationFuente: INE y OCEI
Census	Mérida	Conurbation
1950	25,000	-
1960	-	-
1971	74,000	-
1981	156,956	-
1990	178,580	271,992
2001	204,879	345,489
2011	217.537	391.287
2021	70.879	103.646

Despite being one of the largest cities in the Venezuelan Andes, Mérida has traditionally been less populated in comparison to other more rapidly growing cities in the country. At the beginning of the 19th century, the city only had about 5,000 inhabitants. The demographic growth saw no major changes until the last three decades of the 20th century, when the population tripled, from 74,000 (according to the 1971 census) to the current estimate of 214,000. The increase in number of inhabitants was mainly due to a recent exodus of farmers moving to the urban centers, a phenomenon seen all over the country. Moreover, the prestige of the University of the Andes transformed Mérida in one of the leading educational centers nationwide. As a result, the city houses an important student population from all over the country.

According to the last census, performed in 2001, Mérida's population was of 204,879 inhabitants. This value does not include the population omitted by the survey, which was estimated to be about 6% nationwide. However, Mérida's metropolitan (greater) area, which includes the neighboring cities of Tabay and Ejido, houses over 300,000 inhabitants.

In 2006, assuming the usual natural level of growth in the area (between 2.1% and 3% annually), the population reached 230,000 inhabitants, while the metropolitan area would have reached 350,000, thanks to the high growth rate in the city of Ejido, which is one of the largest of the Andes area. Other estimates indicate that the actual population of the city has now reached about 250,000 inhabitants and that the metropolitan area has 350,000 inhabitants. The population of Mérida is relatively homogeneous. There is, however, a large community of foreigners, resulting from the inter- and intra-continental migratory patterns of past eras. Among these there are significant groups of Italians, Portuguese, and Colombians. According to the 1990 census, a little over 4% of the population–some 7,406 inhabitants–is of foreign origin.

== Health care ==
The city enjoys the highest quality of life in Venezuela. In the year 2000, thirty-six health centers were located in the metropolitan area of Mérida, as follows: one type I hospital, one type III hospital, and one type IV hospital, in the city proper, plus 15 urban clinics, four of type III and 11 of type I. The area also has 18 rural clinics, 13 of type II and 5 of type I.

As in other respects, the Universidad de Los Andes and its buildings are closely tied to the city; the health care infrastructure consists largely of medical centers belonging to the former, in addition to private health centers. Notable among the public hospitals that offer free services is the Instituto Autónomo Hospital Universitario de Los Andes (IHULA), the largest in the region, as well as two smaller hospitals and a chapter of the Venezuelan Red Cross. The larger private hospitals (commonly referred to as "clinics") are the Clinical Hospital of Mérida, the Clinical Center, the Mérida Clinic, and the Albarregas Clinic. There are also another dozen smaller clinics.

== Economy ==
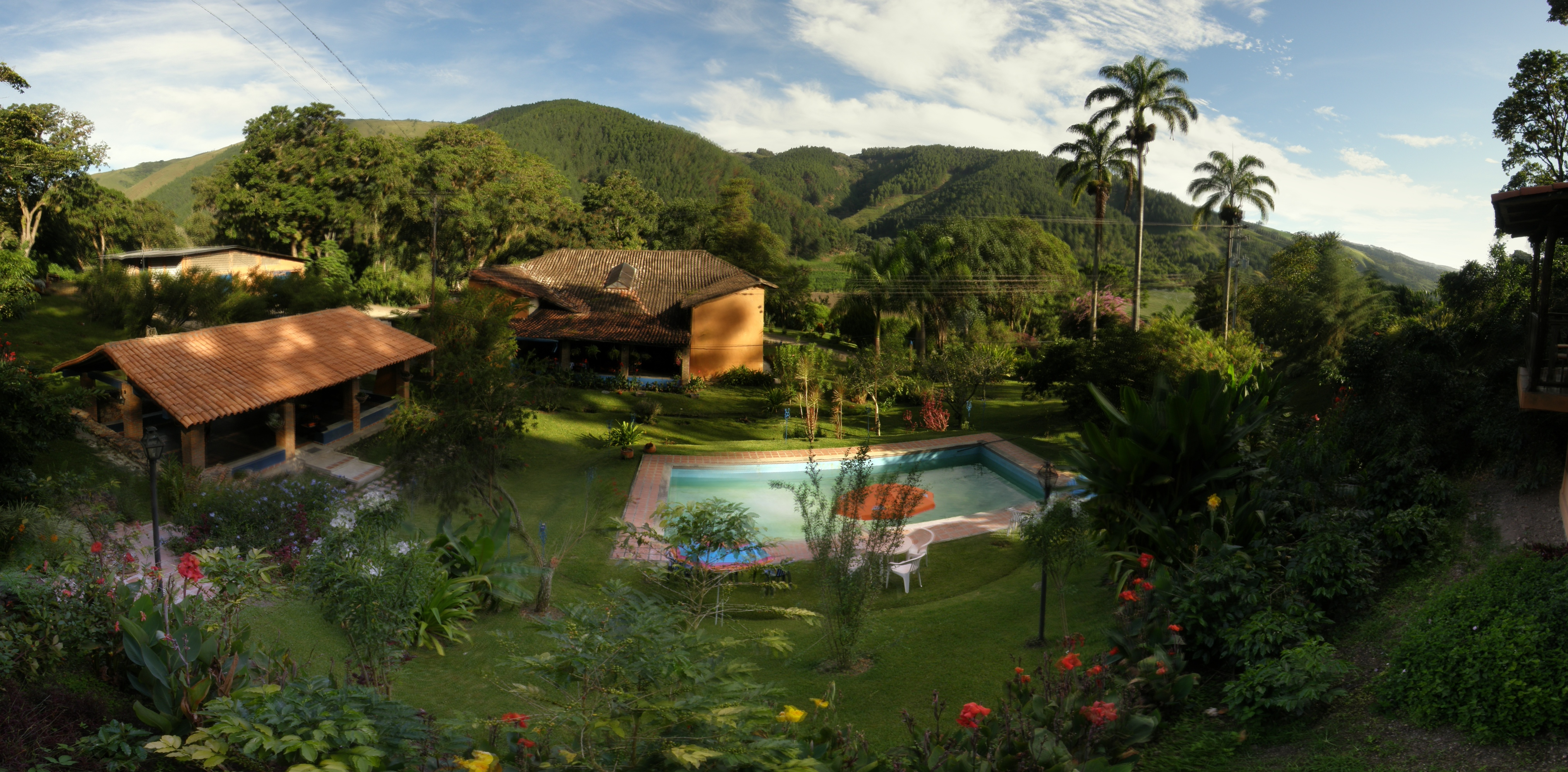
View of an Andean inn. Tourism is the city's main source of income.

The city of Mérida has one of the lowest poverty indexes in Venezuela. According to the 2001 census, 18.09% of the population lives in poverty; this figure is beaten only by San Cristóbal (17.05%) and the municipalities of Chacao (8.69%), Baruta (11.22%) and San Antonio de Los Altos (6.13%) in the state of Miranda.

The city's economy has been evolving and transforming since the beginning of the 20th century. Traditionally, agriculture formed the most significant part of economic activity in Mérida, which was the distribution center for agricultural goods in the state. Furthermore, large sugar cane haciendas were located nearby; their income led to the construction of a central sugar refinery in which all of Mérida's sugar cane was processed. This refinery was eventually abandoned and has now been converted into a museum. With the construction of Mérida Cable Car, the trans-Andes highway, and the city's airport, the city's economy evolved, with the tertiary services sector—especially tourism—displacing the primary agricultural sector.

Tourism, dubbed the "green industry", is the principal source of income in the city, and one of the most flourishing industries. Touristic activity benefits from the potential offered by the Andes mountains surrounding the city, and from the city's own parks, museums, and plazas, among other features. In addition, in recent years, owing to the creation of the only free cultural, scientific, and technological zone in the country, the city has begun to develop in the field of technology, thanks also to the support of the university in this matter. The city of Mérida now stands out at the national level for its low cost of living and its high (relative to cost of living) per capita income of $4,381, ninth among Venezuelan cities. The service sector contributes a large percentage of the state's income. In Mérida 82,537 people are economically active, of whom 6.67% are unemployed.

== Transportation ==
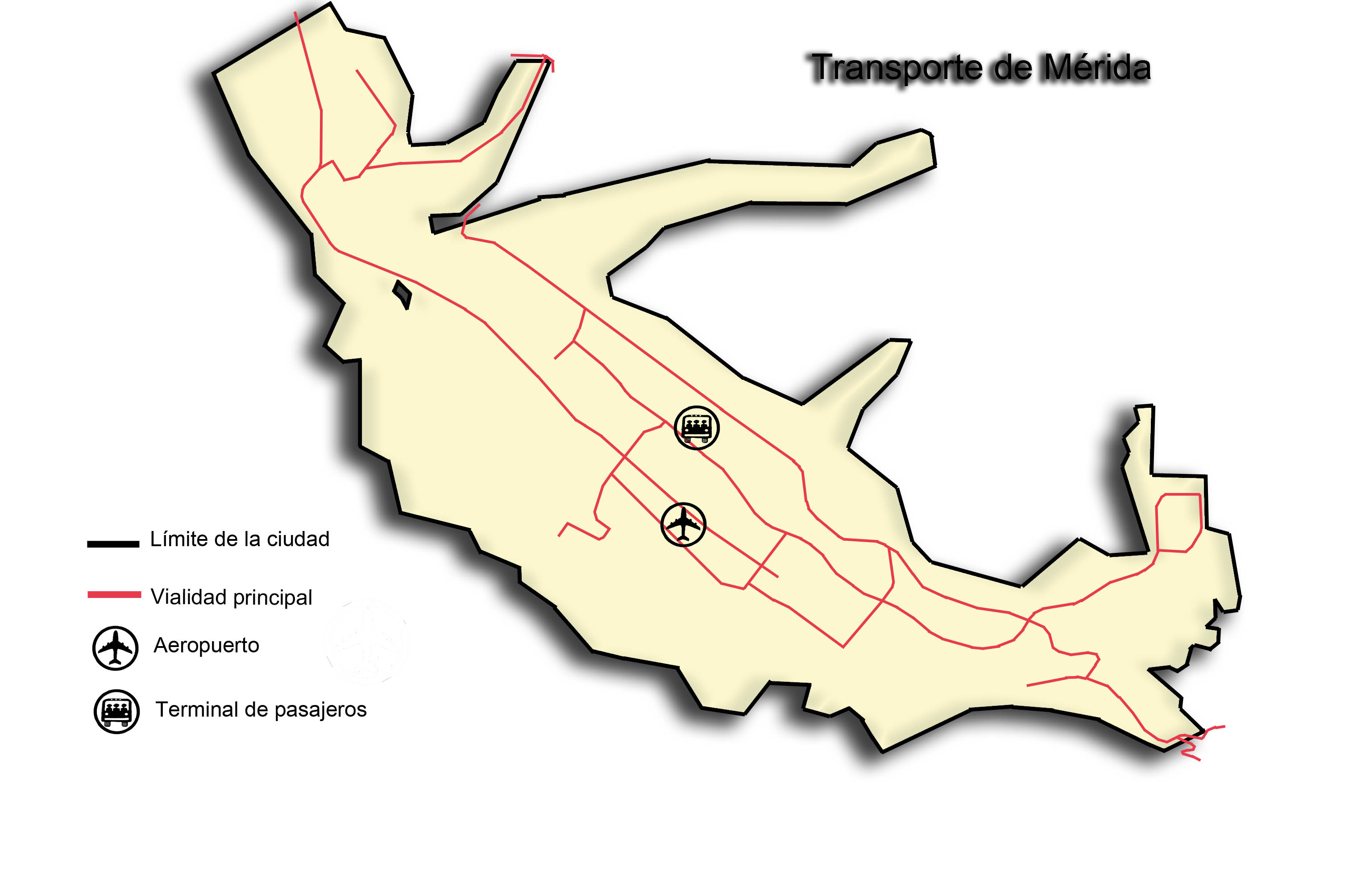
Transportation map of Mérida

During the colonial era and long after independence, the city was isolated from other parts of the country because of the lack of transportation routes to the outside world. Midway through the 19th century, the first highway was built, linking the city with the rest of the country, thereby facilitating access and vehicular traffic. After this point other routes were planned, but lack of maintenance and the nature of the terrain have caused significant interruptions in land traffic between Mérida and the rest of the country.

=== Airport ===
The city had one national airport, Alberto Carnevalli Airport, which is embedded in the center of the city, and once offered connections to the principal cities of the western Venezuela, such as Maracaibo and Caracas. Furthermore, this airport was one of the most active in the country, with more than 20 daily flights to and from Caracas alone. The airport was closed down however in 2009 due to the many accidents that occurred because of its difficult position within the Andes. As of 2015, Avior Airlines offered flights to Caracas; those flights were later cancelled and the airport, as of 2022, has no commercial airline service. Other nearby airports, such as Juan Pablo Pérez Alfonso International Airport in El Vigía, now serve Mérida.

The airport was built in 1956, on the former grounds of a slaughterhouse. Commercial air service was provided by two airlines. There is also an area for private aviation, which receives various types of private flights as well as air ambulance flights, and the delivery of parcels and other valuables.

=== Road network ===
Mérida has four large internal roadways, which run from one end of the city to the other, and five smaller roadways. The largest is the combination of the Andrés Bello and Urdaneta avenues. With a length of more than 8 km (5 mi), it runs from the neighborhoods of the central quarter of Mérida to the outskirts of Ejido. The other three correspond to Las Américas and Alberto Carnevali avenues; 16 de septiembre and Tulio Febres Cordero avenues; and the corridor of Los Próceres avenue.

Two national highways connect Mérida with other cities in Venezuela. The first is Troncal 7 or the Trans-Andes Highway, which runs to the city of Valera. This highway crosses the Andes by way of the valley of the Chama River, and, arriving at the region of Apartaderos, is crossed by Local 1. Finally, following the course of the Santo Domingo River, it arrives at the city of Barinas. The other national highway is the so-called Carretera La Variante. Upon arriving at the Estanques region it becomes Local 8 or Autopista Rafael Caldera. La Variante connects Mérida with El Vigía, and in turn, with the Pan-American Highway, thereby giving the city a connection with Colombia and with other important destinations, such as San Cristóbal and Maracaibo.

In addition to the national highways, three alternative routes exit the city of Mérida. The first, called the Vía del Valle (Valley Road) links the city with the north, to various communities in the valley of the Culata, in the municipality of Santos Marquina. The second is an alternative route to the city of Ejido and other communities such as Jají and La Azulita; it is also a tourism route, with various lookout points facing Mérida in its initial section. A third minor route, used exclusively by rural vehicles, connects the city with the community of Los Nevados and with the Sierra Nevada National Park.

=== Public transport ===
Along with a trolleybus rapid-transit system (still under construction and not fully open), the city relies on a vast system of urban and interurban bus routes which connect the city with its metropolitan area. The conventional bus routes traverse the various avenues of the city and cover a large percentage of the city's area. Mérida has one of Venezuela's best public transit systems; nevertheless, the system has become overwhelmed by increasing demand, and may be beginning to collapse. Among the existing routes, the route from the center of the city of Ejido to the center of the city of Mérida stands out, with a volume of thousands of passengers daily.

The bus routes are serviced by private companies, the majority of which are cooperatives or driver's associations, following the private model practiced in most of the cities in Venezuela. However, the prices charged are regulated by the city and supervised by the municipal organization for metropolitan transport. As is the practice throughout the country, the public transport system has special fares for senior citizens, and a student pass providing some of the lowest costs in the country.

After years of study, the construction of a non-polluting mass transit system was proposed; the trolleybus was chosen as the most appropriate means of transport. Construction of the Mérida trolleybus system started near the end of the 1990s. The first line was inaugurated on June 18, 2007, with 15 of 34 proposed stations completed. This route serves Ejido and Mérida. The second line is in the planning stages and is expected to be 12 km (7 mi) long with 3 common stations alongside or crossing route 1. Route 3, an aerial cableway (originally planned to be a funicular), is a 3 km (2 mi) long route that will connect the community of Chama to a Mérida trolleybus station; construction has yet to begin. Once construction is completed, Mérida will be the first city in Latin America with under 500,000 inhabitants to have a rapid-transit system. The existing bus lines will be reorganized into 47 or so feeder routes, in order to provide better public transit to less-serviced areas.

=== Regional transport ===
The only regional public transit available in Mérida is by bus. These depart from the city bus station. In addition, there are other private terminals from which private lines depart. From the central station one can take buses to destinations within the state, the region, and the rest of the country. Some of the most heavily used routes in the country start from this station, in particular, those that link Mérida with the city of Caracas. Though Venezuela is undertaking the construction of a national railway system, the IAFE, in order to link together the country, the city of Mérida is not projected to be a stop on this system: the nearest stop will be the city of El Vigía, some 60 km (37 mi) away.

== Points of interest ==
Mérida contains numerous historical squares, colonial houses, churches, and government buildings that make up most of its sightseeing spots. Moreover, the educational development of the city due, for the most part, to its university (ULA) has contributed to the creation of museums, libraries, and centers for scientific research, such as the Center for Astronomy Research (CIDA), located a few kilometers from the city in the mountains near Apartaderos.

=== Monuments, public buildings, and historic places ===
House of Former Governors
This colonial-style villa, located in the central quarter, was the official residence of the state governors.
Rectorate's Building
Seat of the university's rectorate and Aula Magna.
Government Palace
The government building, regional executive branch.
Plaza Monumental Román Eduardo Sandia
The Bullfighting Arena of Mérida was built in 1967. It has a capacity of 16,000 people and it is frequently used for cultural activities, besides serving its original purpose of bullfighting arena during the Sun Fairs.

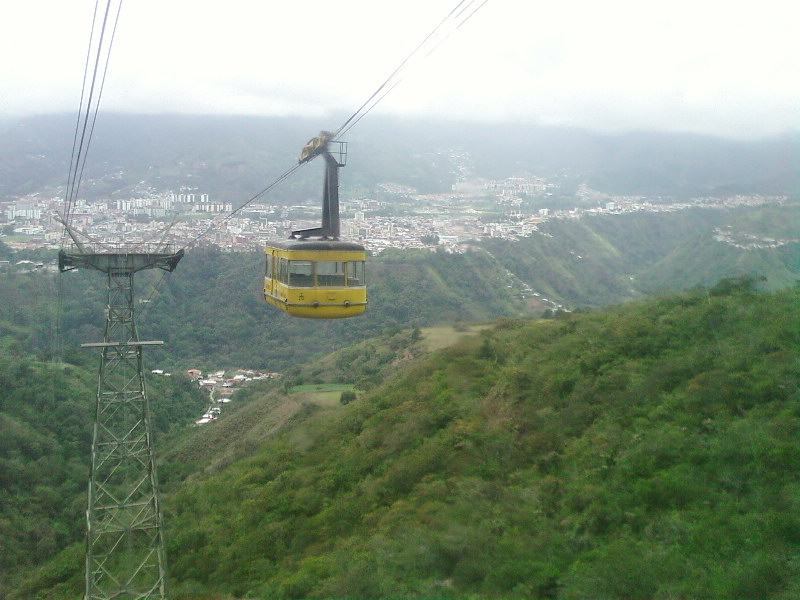
The 1957-opened Mérida cable car line to Espejo Peak (service restored in 2016 after an eight-year suspension)

Cable Car
The Mérida Cable Car is one of the main touristic spots. In its trajectory, it ascends from the central quarter to the Sierra Nevada. Currently, it holds two world records: one for being the longest cable car system in the world (12.5 km or 7.8 mi) and another one for being the highest cable car system in the world (4,367 m or 14,327 ft). The cable car was completed in 1958. It was closed in 2008 for construction of a new cable car system. It was reopened in April 2016.

=== Religious buildings ===
Mérida has about two dozen religious buildings dedicated to Christianity, the most important of which are Catholic churches and chapels, since it is the religion with most number of followers in Venezuela.

Cathedral of Mérida
The city's Minor Basilica, built in Baroque style, similar to the Cathedral of Toledo, Spain. It is the main Catholic building in the city, where the Archbishop of Mérida presides the mass services.
Iglesia del Carmen
The oldest religious structure in Mérida, Our Lady of Carmen Church stands close to the Plaza Bolívar. Visitors marvel at its colonial architecture and its historical significance – the church is a seat of the Carmelite Brotherhood. It served as cathedral of the city between 1812 and 1866, before the current one was built.
Iglesia de la Tercera

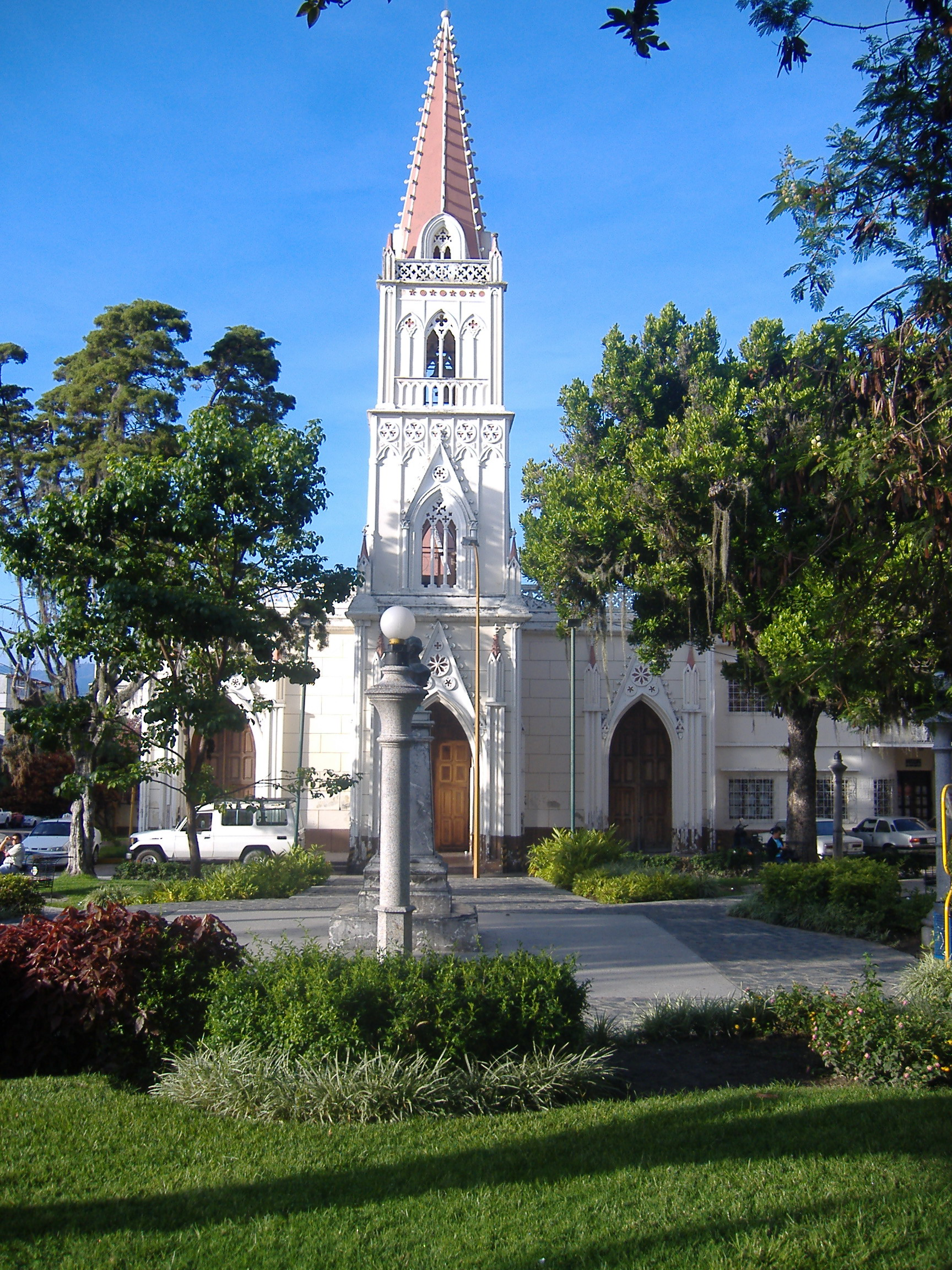
Church and plaza 'del Llano' located in the city center

Iglesia del Llano
Mérida's only building in the Gothic style. It stands near the place where an old chapel held the first wooden cross brought to Mérida by the Spaniards.
Iglesia de Milla
This is one of the oldest churches in the city, originally built in the 18th century and rebuilt in 1907 after an earthquake. It is located in front of the square with the same name.
Archbishop's Palace

A Baroque palace located in front of Bolívar Square. It has served as the residence for the Archbishop since 1951. It houses the Archdiocesan Museum.

=== Parks, squares, and sightseeing ===
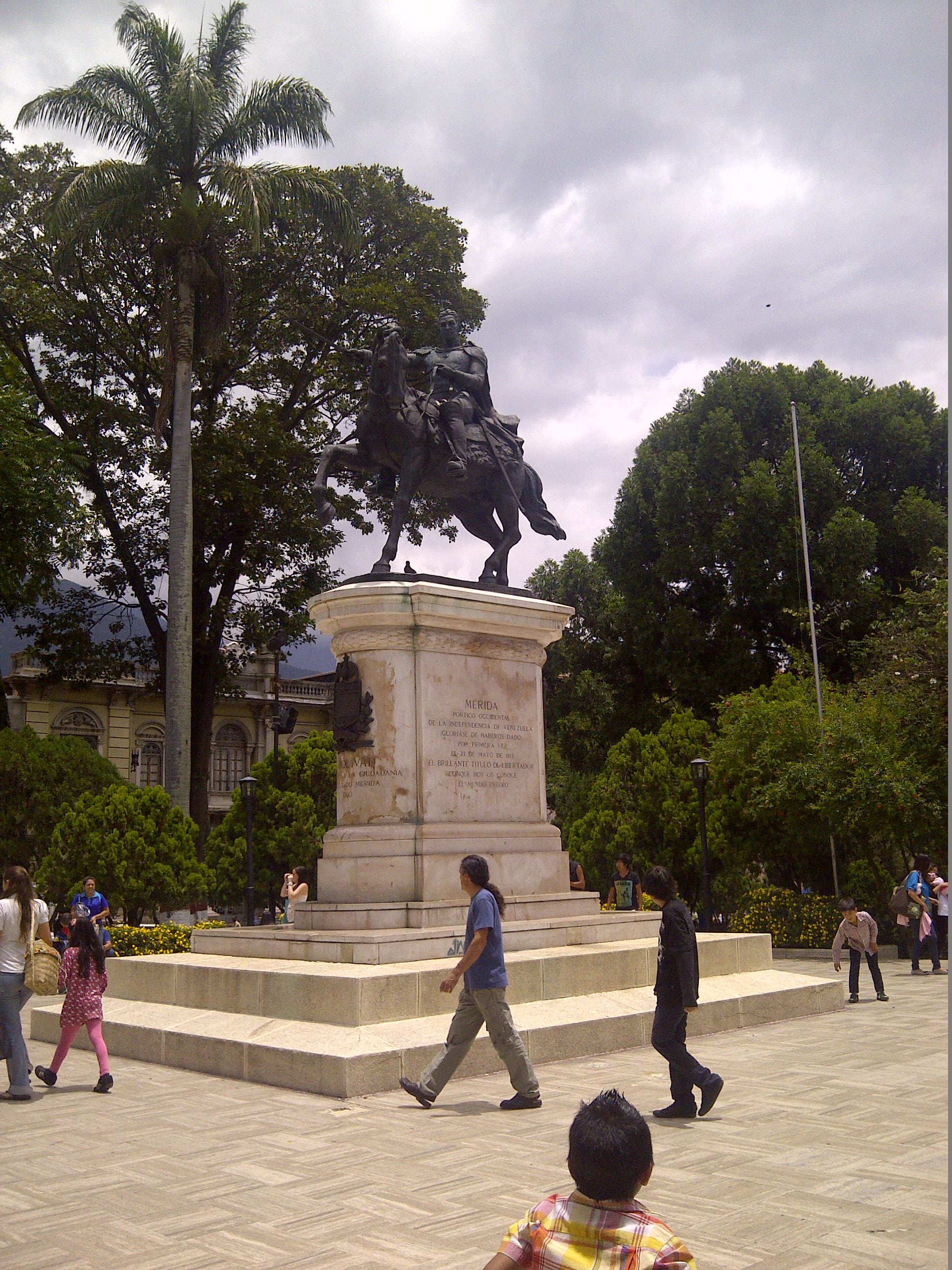
View of the Bolívar Square with the statue dedicated to the Libertador and the cathedral in the background

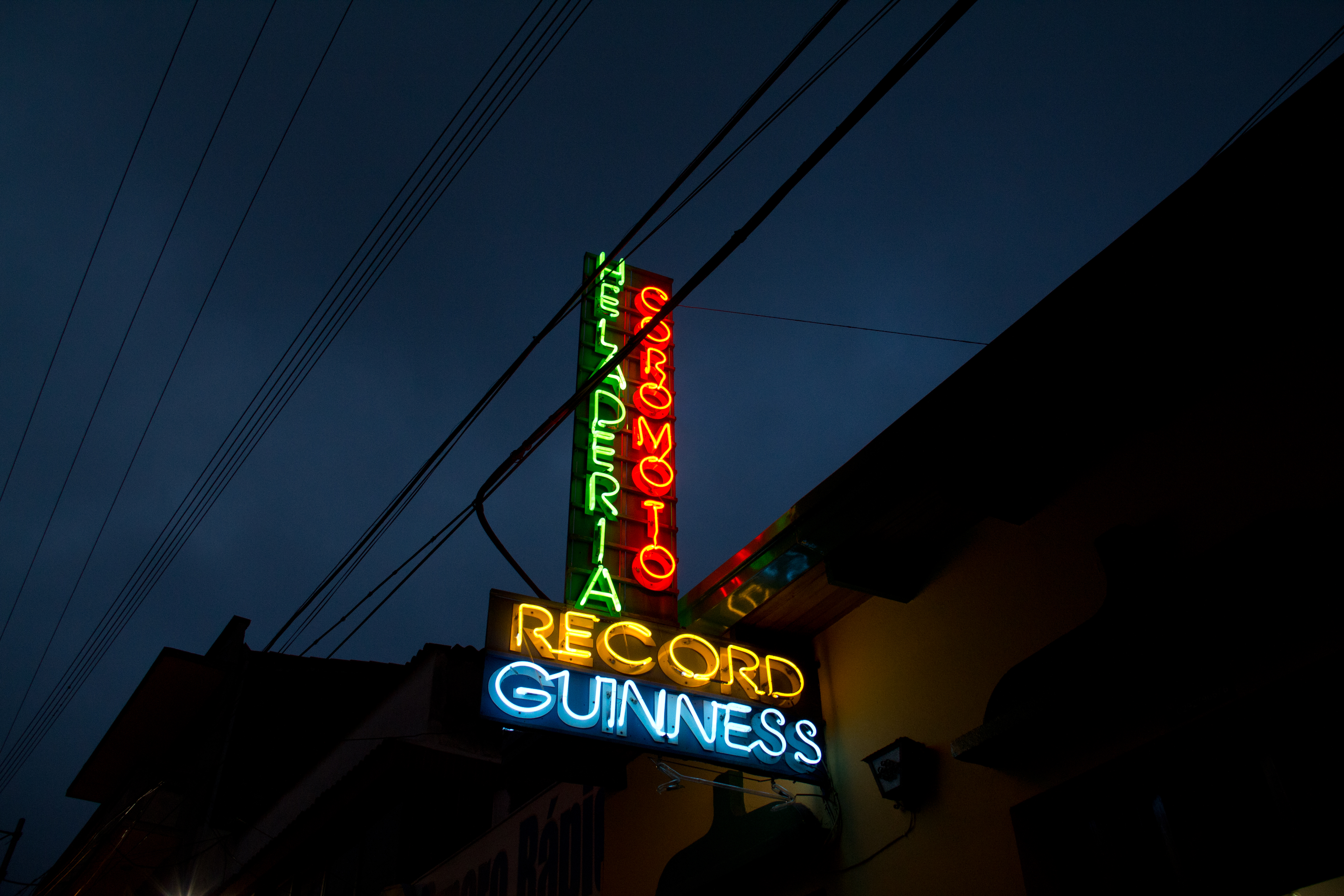
Coromoto Ice Cream Shop, with more than a thousand flavors of ice cream

Mérida is famous nationwide for its great number of parks and squares, providing its inhabitants with access to nature. There are, at least, a dozen squares and two dozen parks, some of which are described below.

Boulevard de los Pintores (Painters' Boulevard)
On this street painters congregate in order to create, exhibit, and sell their works.
Aquarium Garden
This aquarium exhibits both fresh and salt water fish. It also has collections relating to Mérida's rural past.
Beethoven Park
Located in front of the Museum of Modern Art in the northern area of the city, this pretty park has a clock on the ground, whose numbers are flowerpots, and large mechanical carillon clock with wooden elves that play melodies from the famous German composer.
Mérida Botanical Garden
This was the first botanical garden in the city. It is located in the extreme north of the city and has about 40 hectares under cultivation.
Parque Domingo Peña
Also called Paseo de la Feria or Parque de los Conquistadores, consists of an avenue with a lookout point facing the Sierra Nevada. Student celebrations and get-togethers often take place here.
Parque Metropolitano Albarregas
This park is the largest in the city, 22 km (14 mi) long and 612 hectares in area. It is located on the bank of the Albarregas River, and contains play areas for children and a sculpture museum.
Parque Ciudad de los Niños (Children's City Park)
A large children's park, which models the shape of the city on a smaller scale.
Parque de las Cinco Repúblicas (Park of the Five Republics)
A park that is the home of the Bolívar Column, a monument dedicated to Simón Bolívar. This was the first sculpture constructed to honor Bolívar, in 1842. It was commissioned by the then-governor of the province, Gabriel Picón. It was erected to commemorate the moving of Bolívar's remains to the Panteón Nacional in Caracas, from their previous resting place in the city of Santa Marta, Colombia, where Bolívar had been buried following his death in 1830. The monument consists of a pillar on which sits Bolívar's face in bronze.
Parque del Ejército (Park of the Army)
A small park, located in the south of the city, commemorating Venezuela's army. It has green areas, a fountain, and models of military tanks.
Parque La Isla (Island Park)
Situated in the former location of a coffee plantation of the same name, the park was built in 1960 partly as an underwater park, and is 3.5 hectares in area. Its infrastructure is reminiscent to that of an island, offering kids play grounds, trails, and athletic courts. The park houses the largest convention center in the city, as well as the headquarters of Corpoandes (a government-run corporation that promotes development in the Andes region), facilities for cultivating orchids, and a museum dedicated to beekeeping.
Parque Las tres Méridas (Three Méridas Park)
A small park that commemorates the three cities in the world named Mérida (in Spain, Mexico, and Venezuela). It features architectural elements typical of each city.
Parque Zoológico los Chorros de Milla
A small zoo situated in the extreme north of the city where the Milla waterfalls once flowed, it contains species indigenous to Venezuela and the Andes region.
Parque la Marina (Park of the Navy)
Located in Belensate, it has a large water pool surrounding a submarine fin, an underwater clock, and a children's play area in the shape of a boat.
Parque Tibisay
This park is dedicated to Tibisay, princess of the original dwellers of the region, the tribe Mucujún. According to legend, she still laments the death of her fiancé Chief Murachí, who died bravely fighting the Spanish conquistadors. This park is located at the north end of Urdaneta avenue.
Plaza Belén
A small plaza, located to the northeast of the city center, in a neighbourhood of the same name. Its design, like that of most of the other plazas described here, follows the prototypical Spanish colonial style.
Plaza Bolívar
The past and present main square of Mérida, it is surrounded by the most important public and historical buildings of the city. It has an equestrian statue of Bolivar.
Plaza Glorias Patrias
Consists of twin plazas constructed in honor of the independence leaders Vicente Campo Elías and José Antonio Páez.

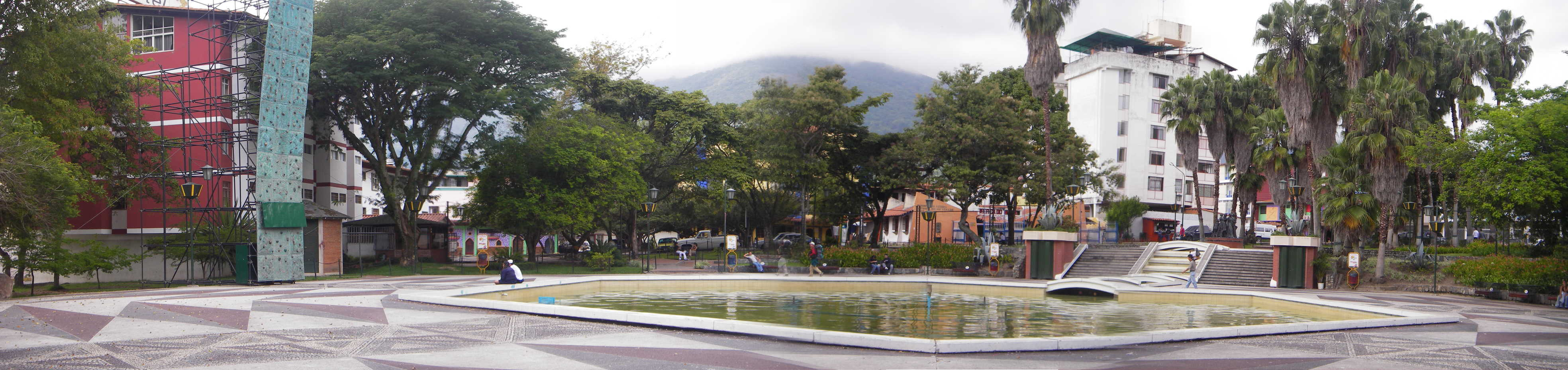
Panoramic view of Plaza las Heroínas in the central quarter of the city

Plaza Las Heroínas (Plaza of the Heroines)
A plaza constructed to honor five women from Mérida who fought for independence. It is surrounded by various markets and artisans shops, and the first Cable Car station.
Plaza de Milla
The actual name of this square is Plaza Sucre. It is located in front the Iglesia de Milla and near the army headquarters, northeast of the city center. It is dedicated to the independence hero Antonio José de Sucre, and it is frequently visited by locals and tourists alike, due to its convenient location among hotels, pensions, restaurants, stores, and ice cream parlors.

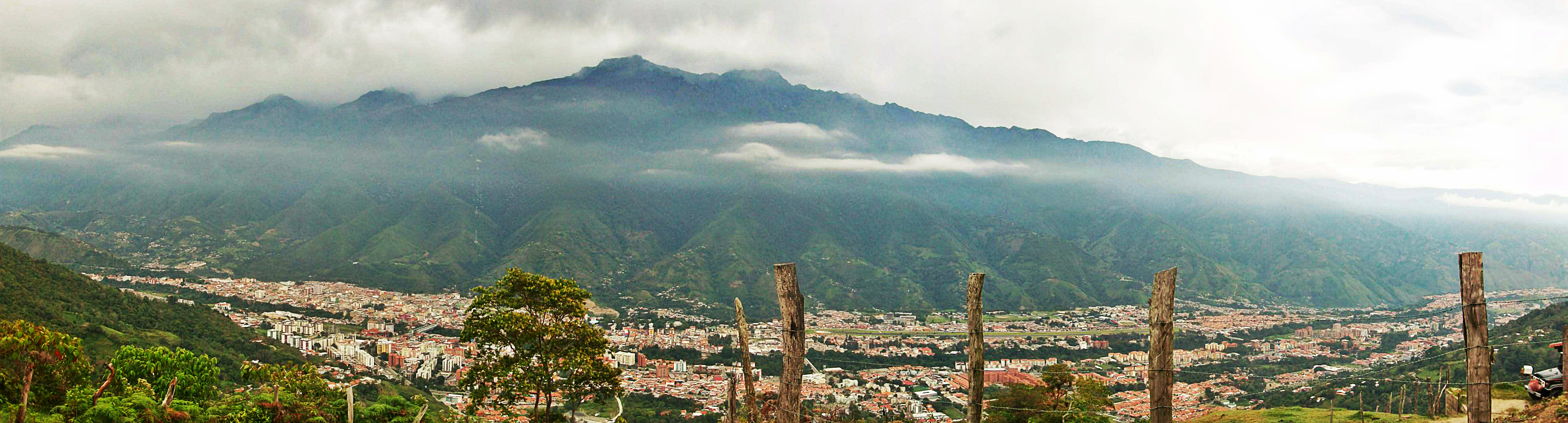
Panoramic view of Mérida City

== Gallery Images ==
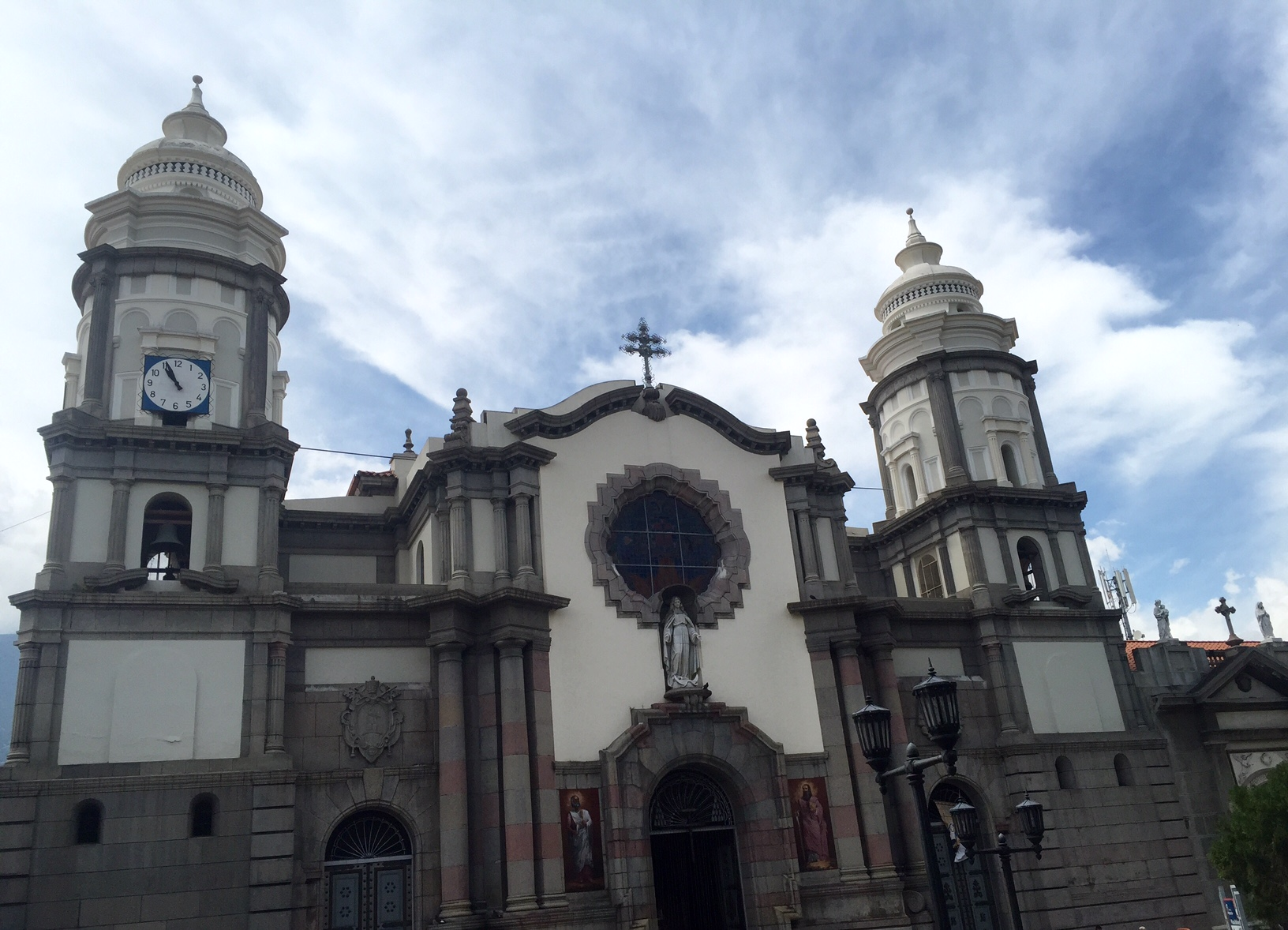
Metropolitan Cathedral of Mérida

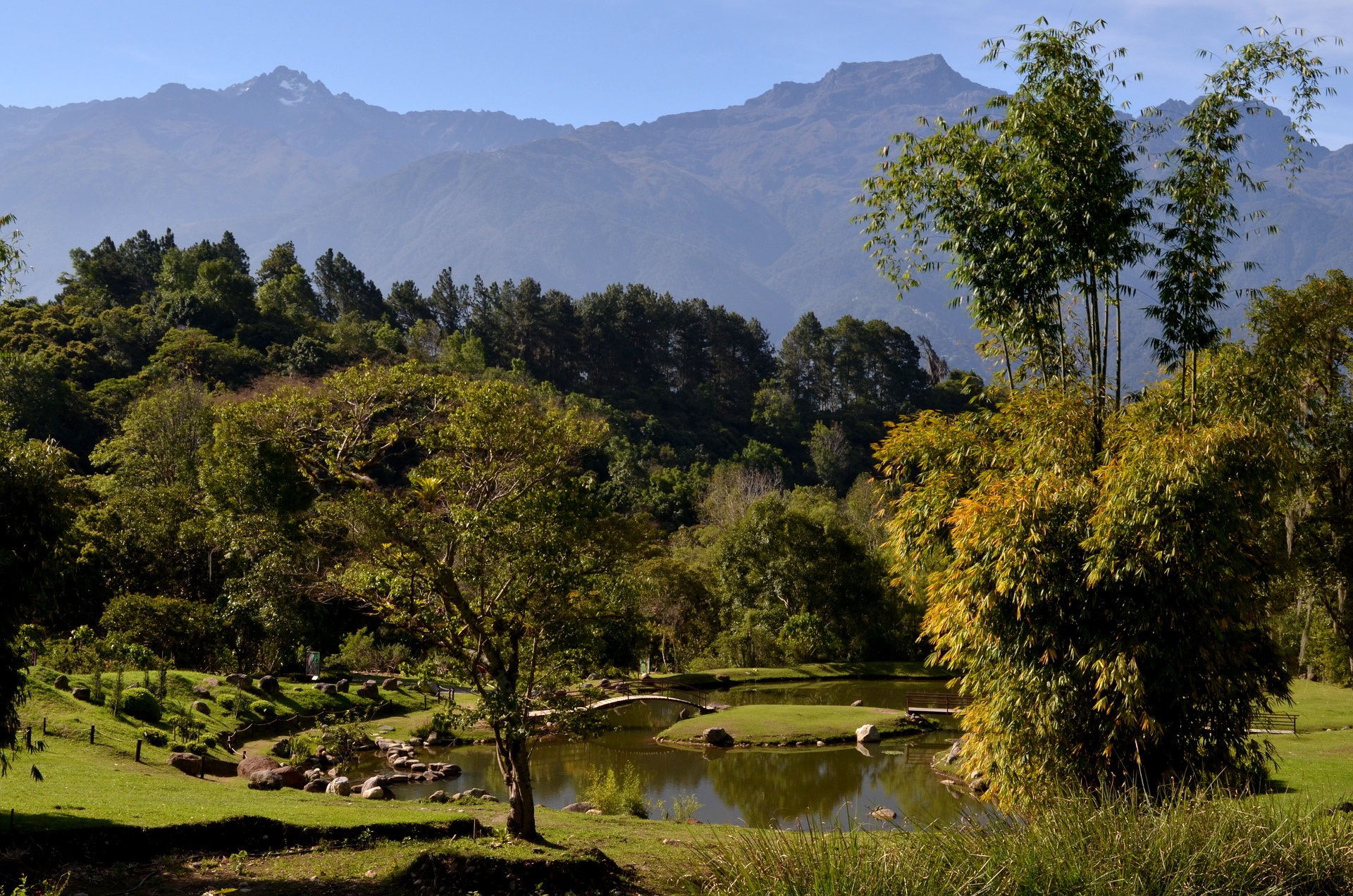
Mérida Botanical Garden

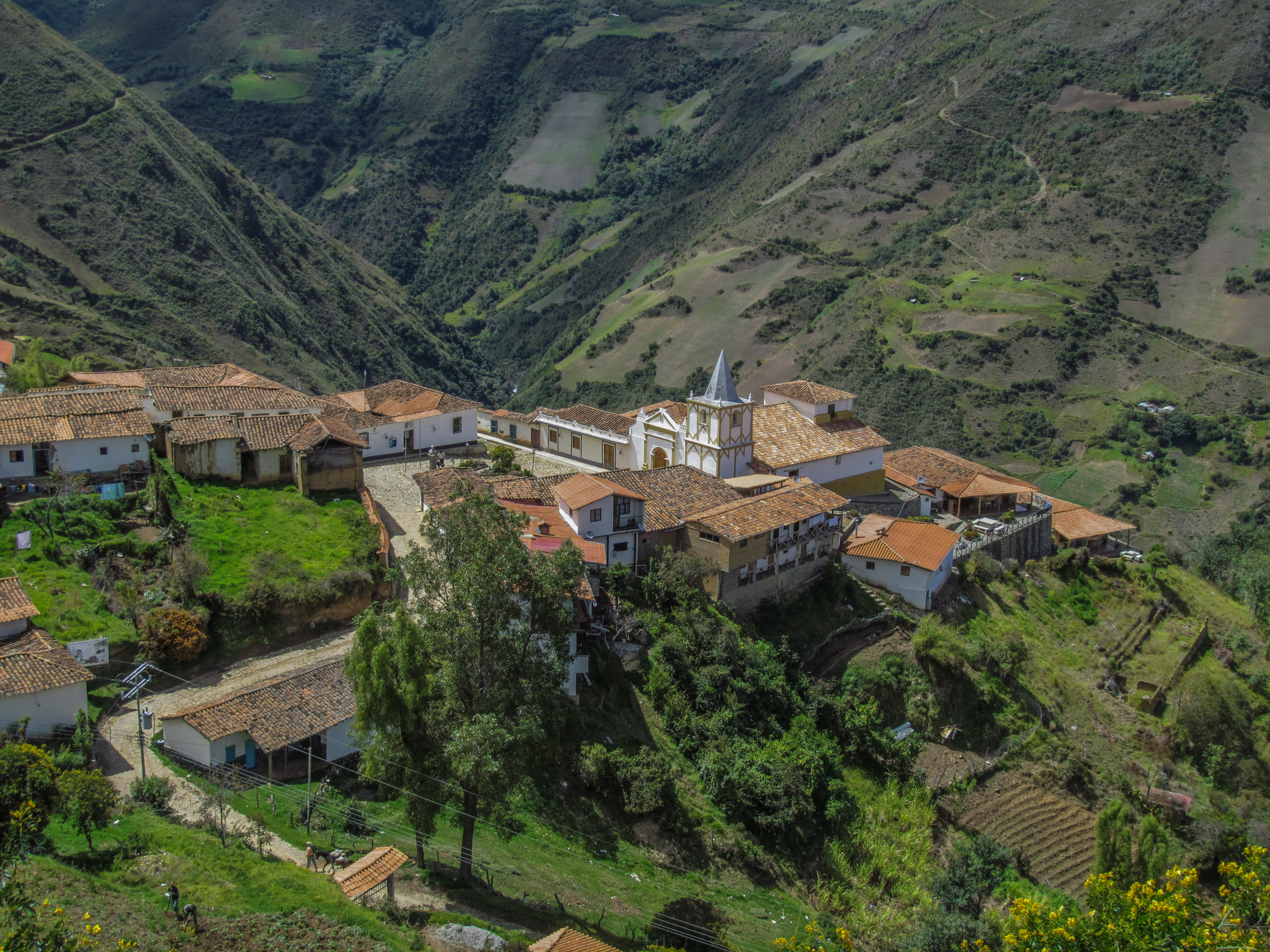
Los Nevados Village

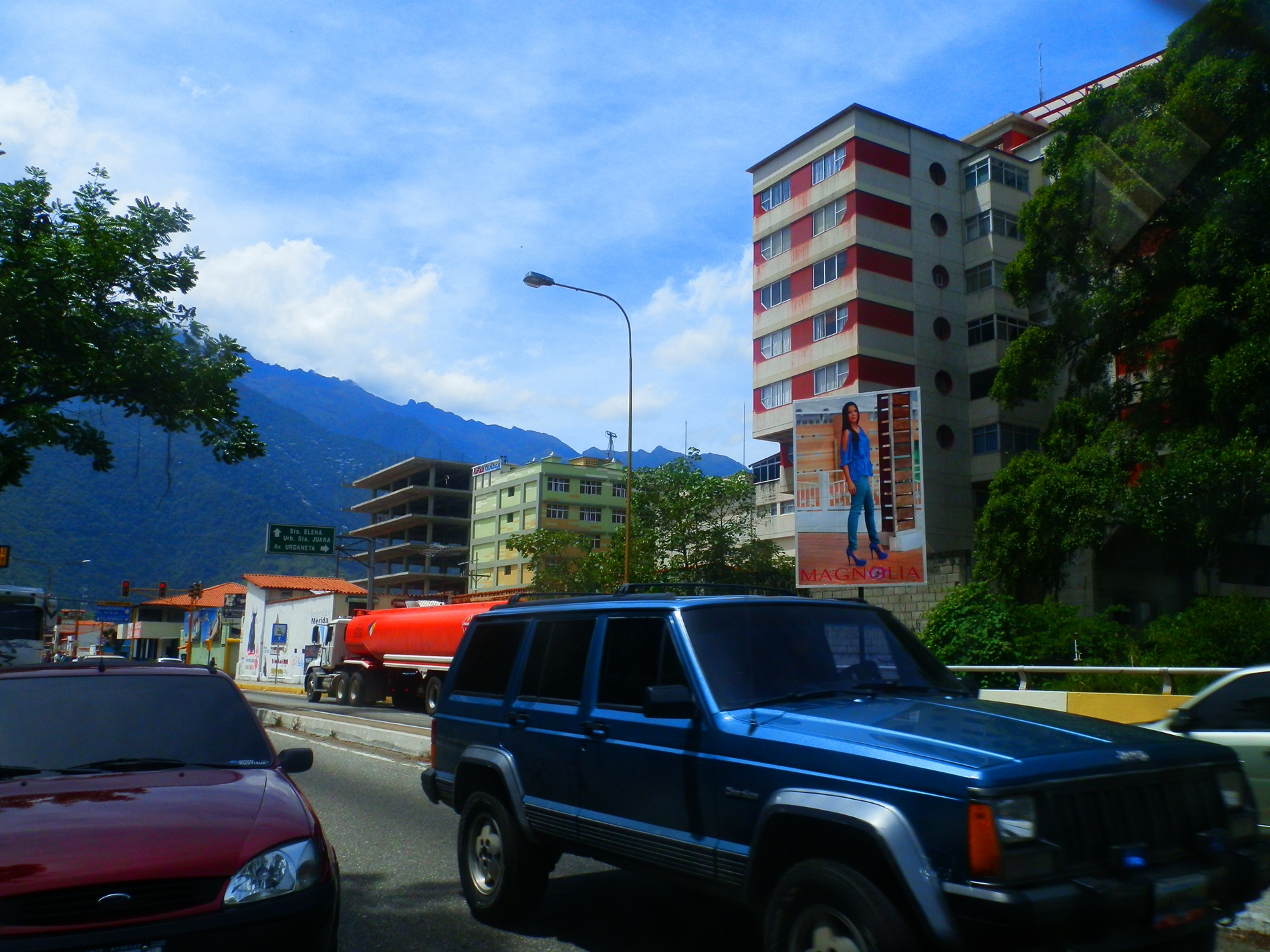
Street in Mérida

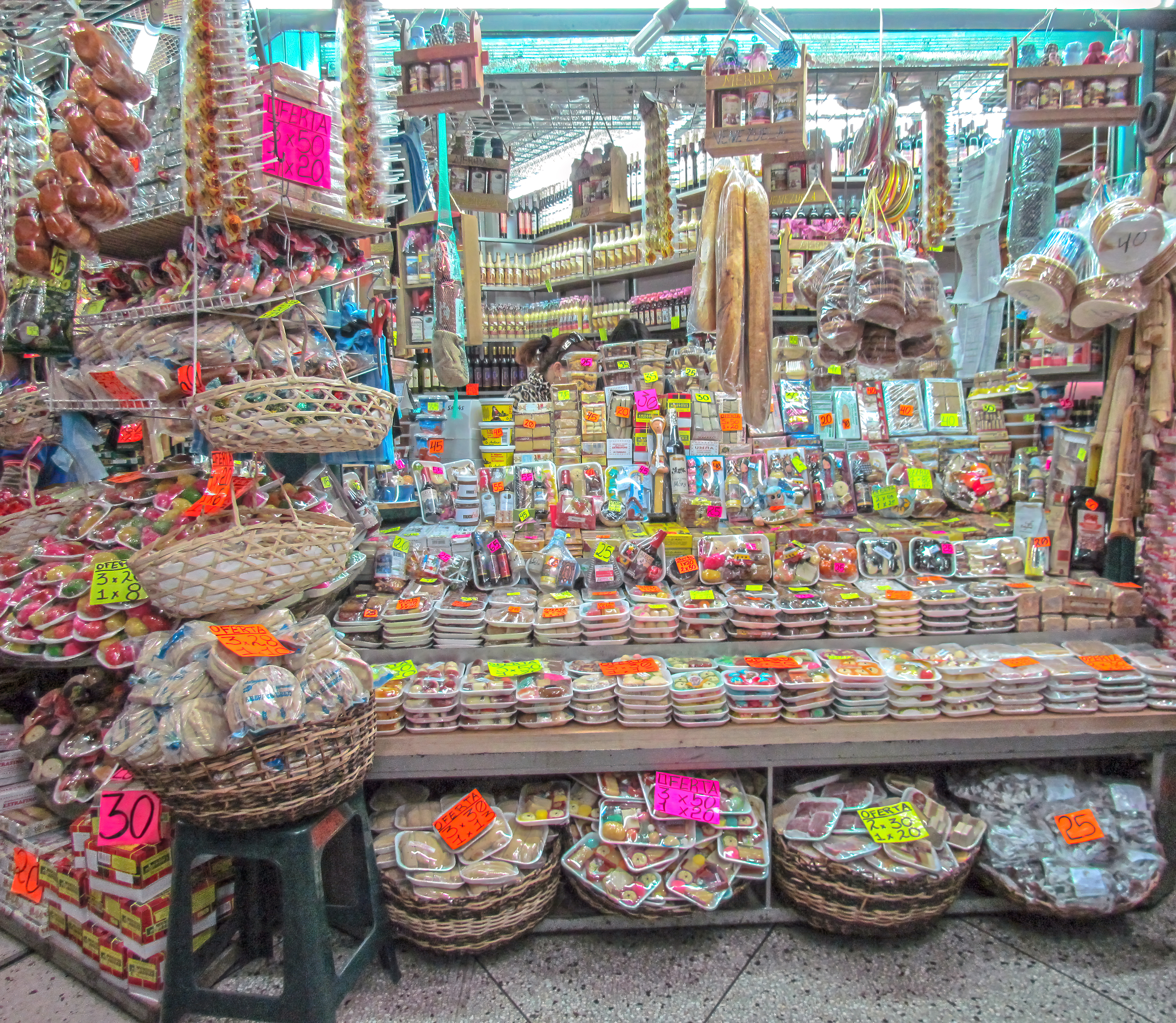
Main Market of Mérida

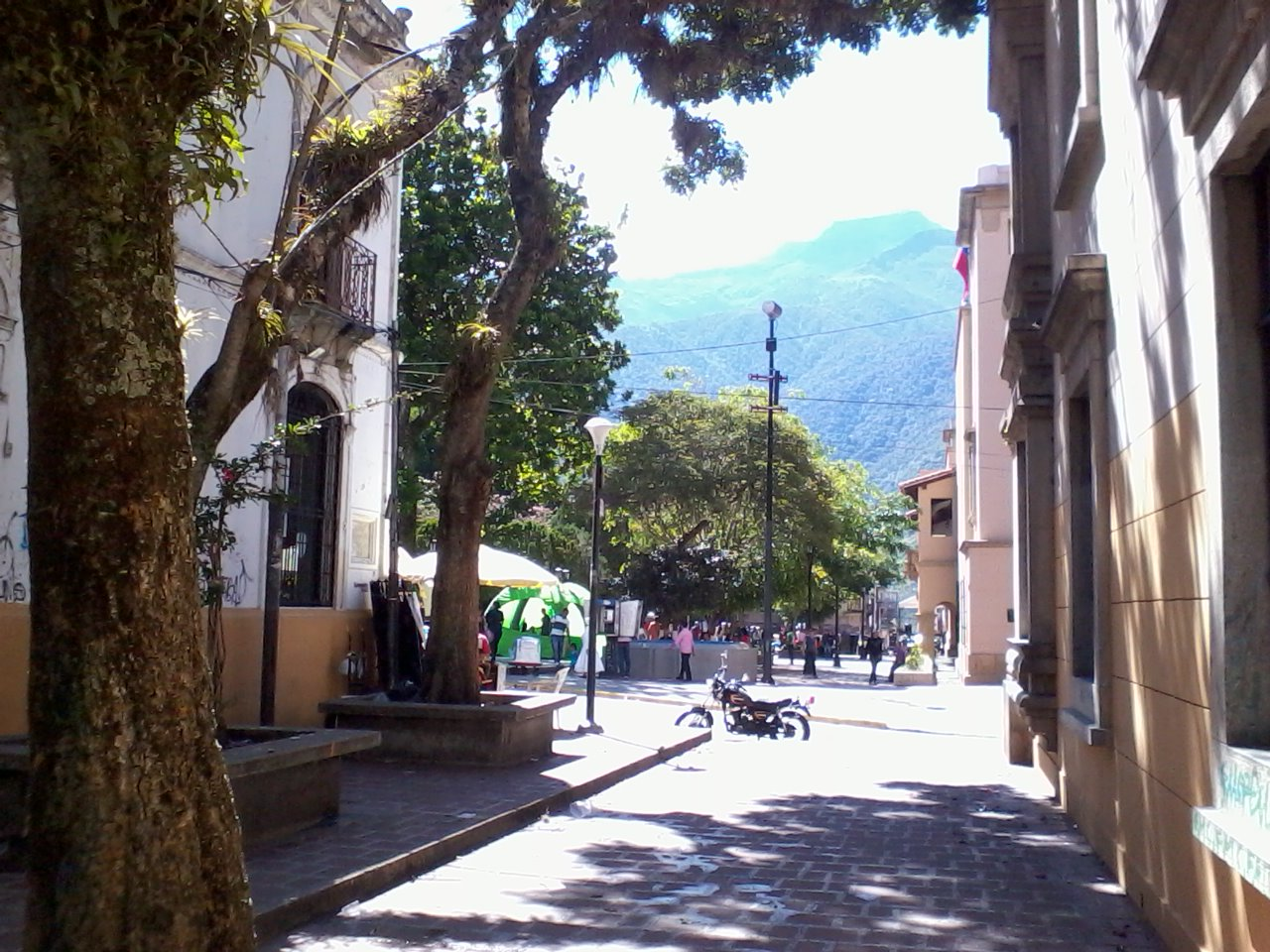
Colonial street in Mérida

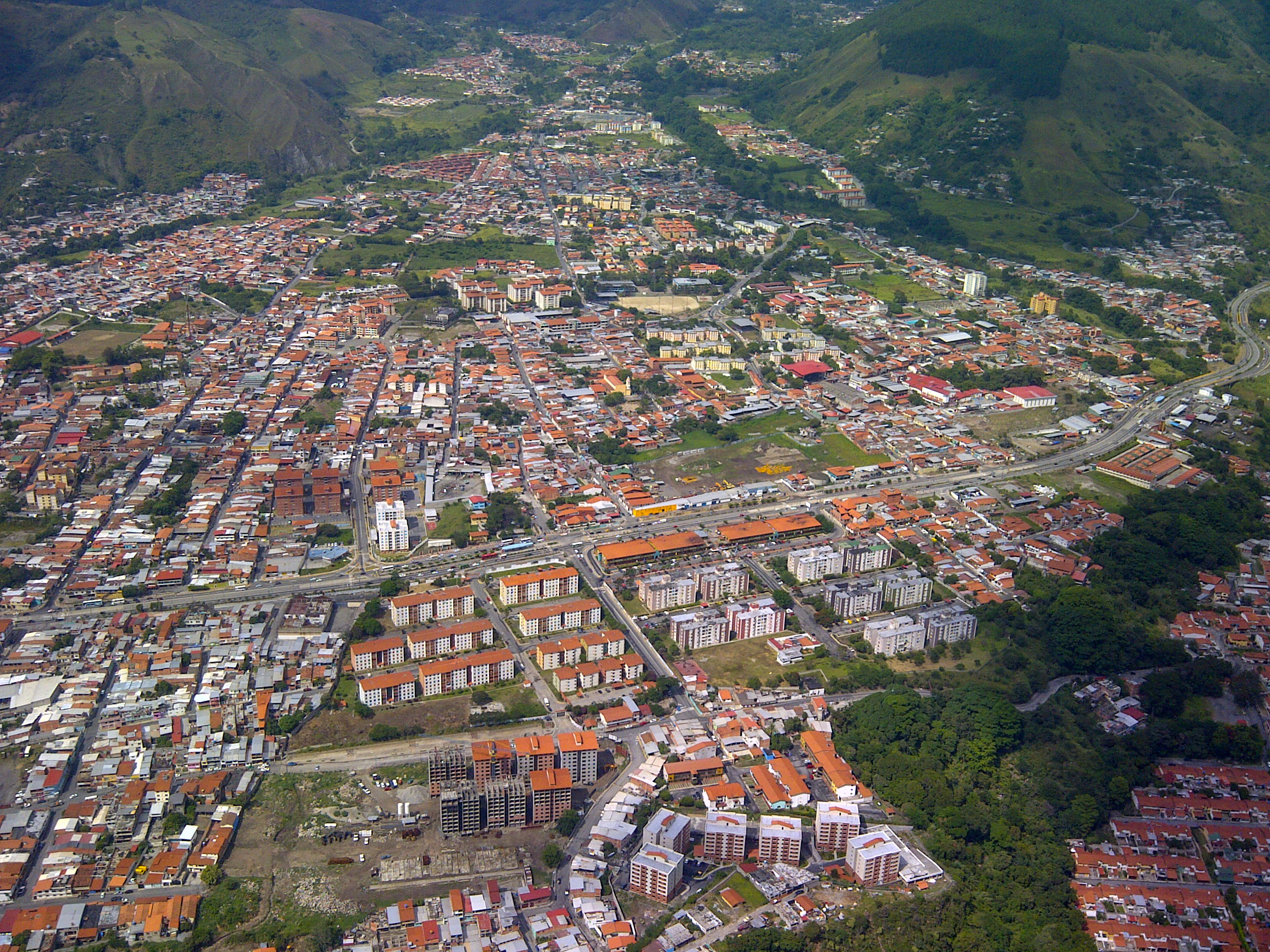
Aerial view of Mérida

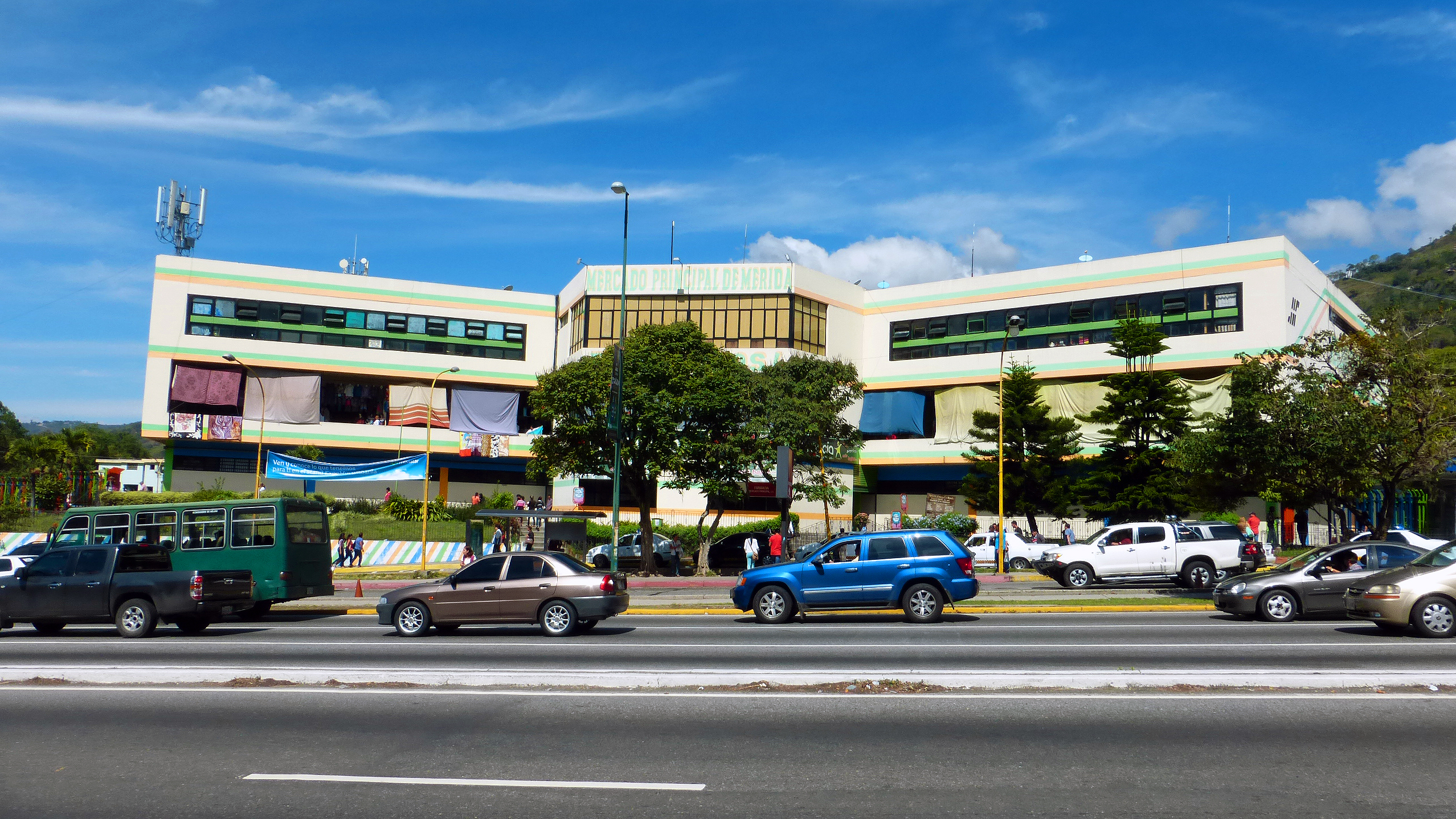
Mérida's Main Market

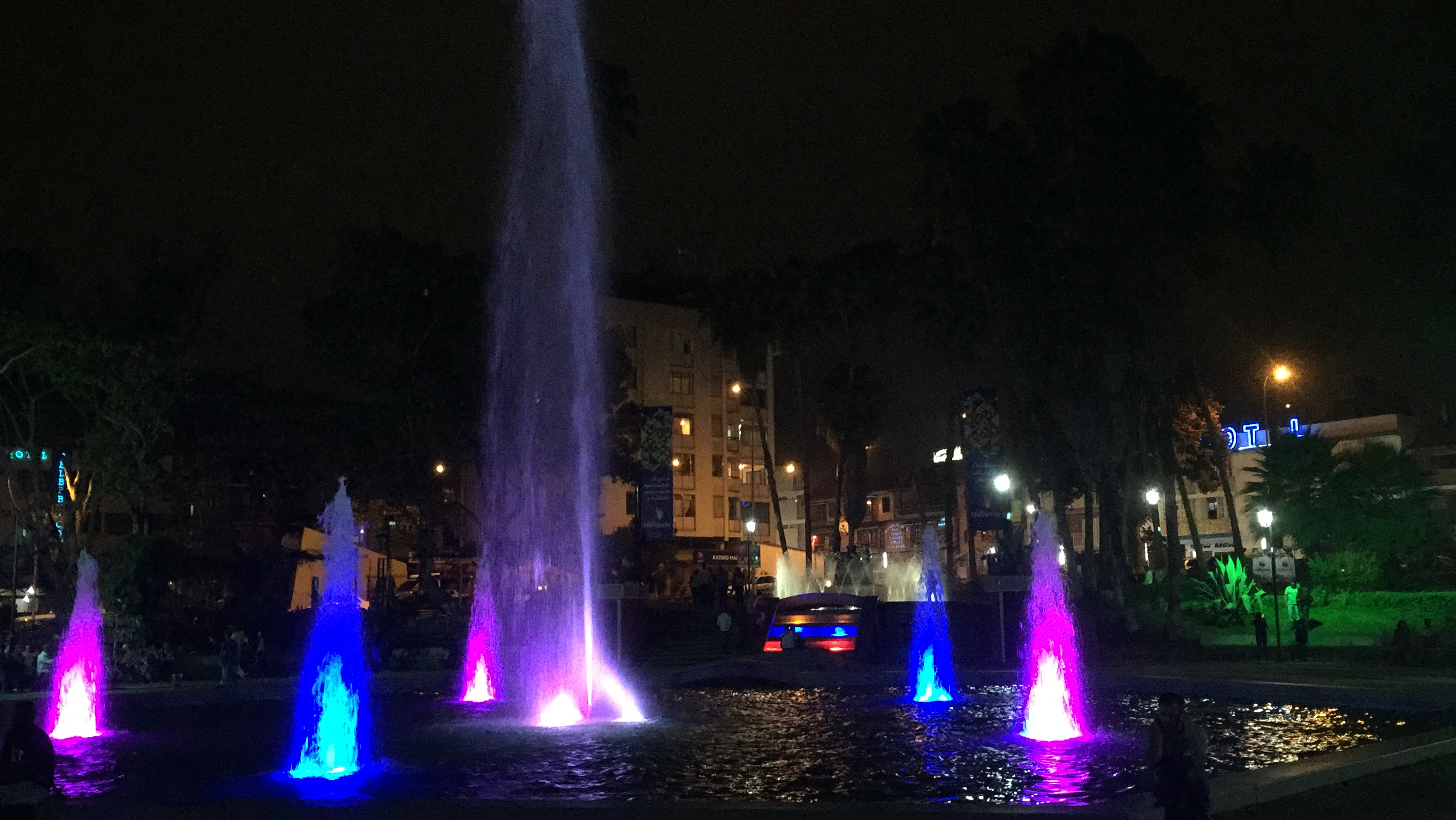
Las Heroínas Square

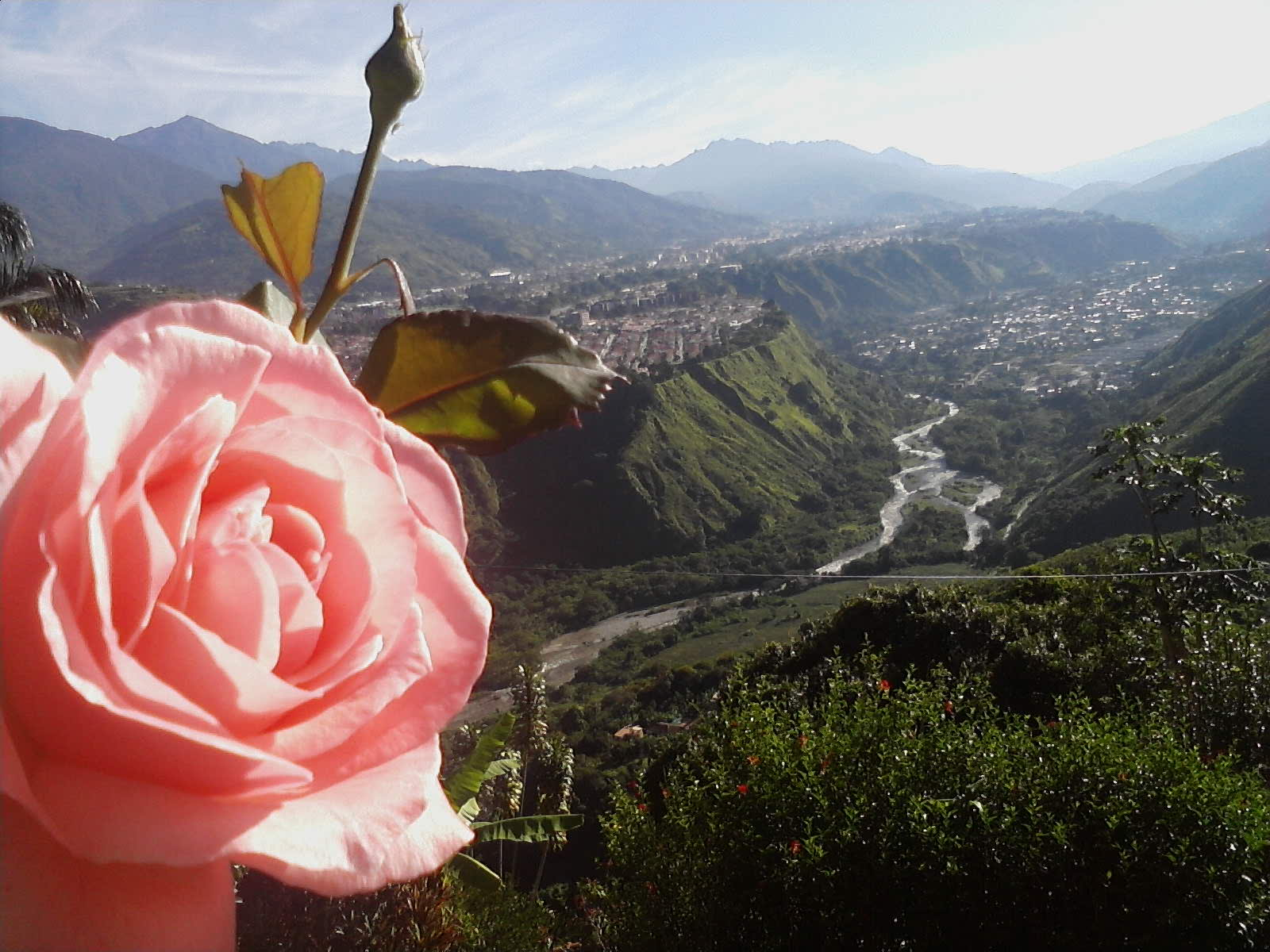
View of Mérida from the hills

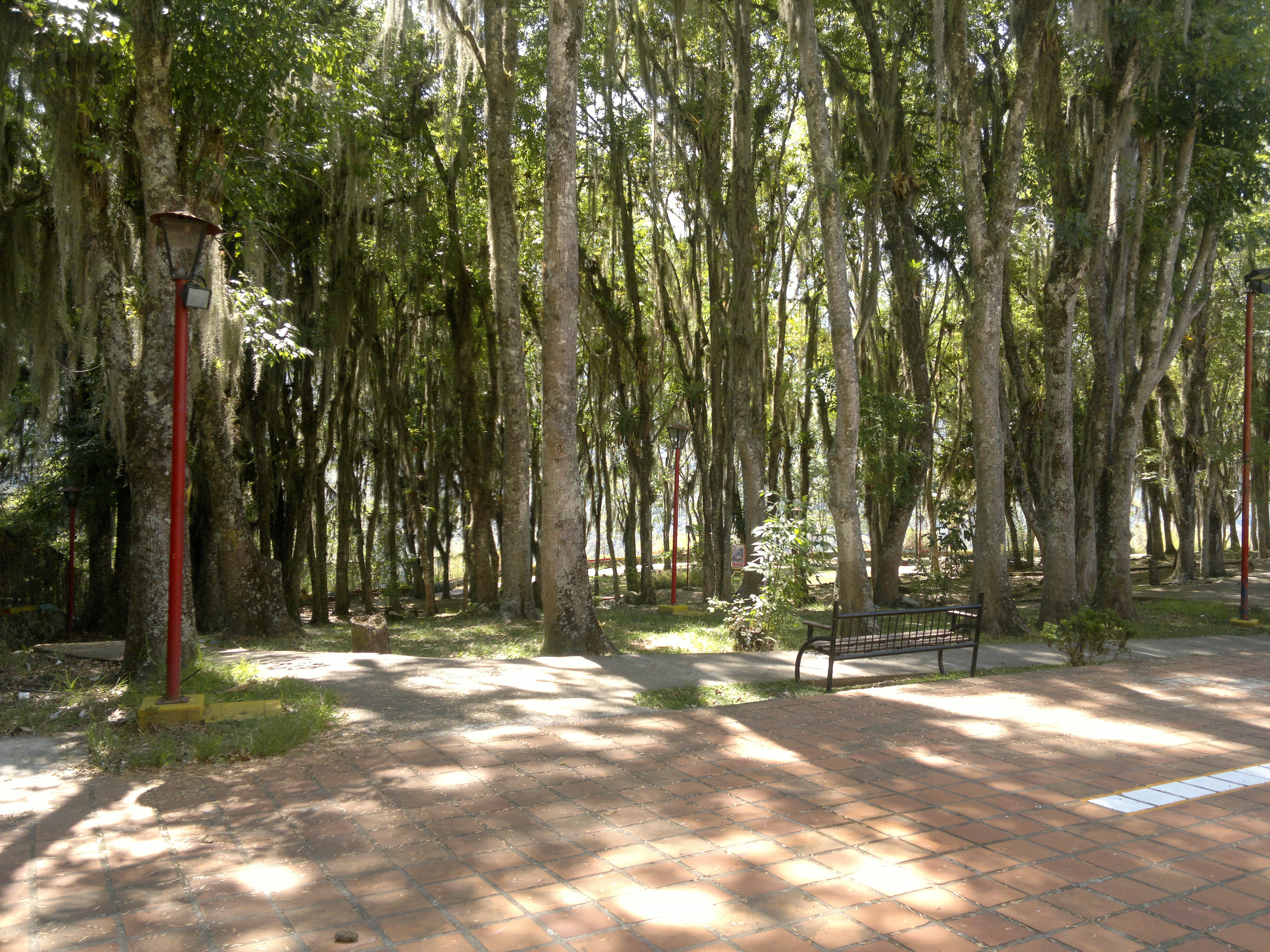
Square in Mérida

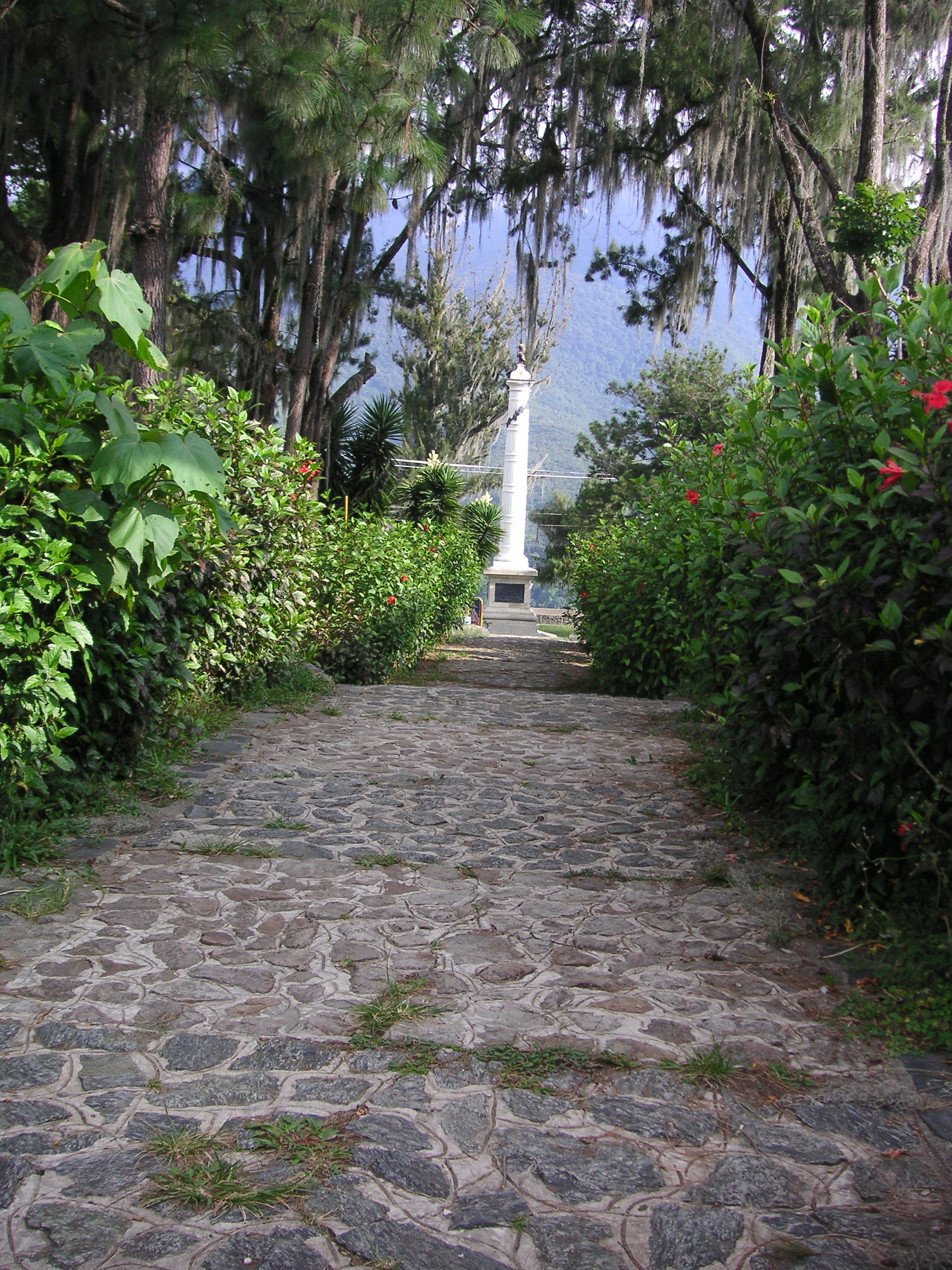
Las 5 Republicas Park

== Education ==
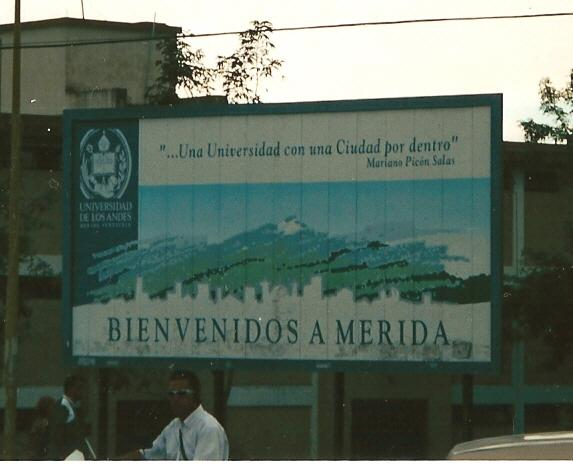
"(Mérida is) ...a university with a city inside it" Mariano Picón Salas, date unknown

Mérida is a student city with a large percentage of its population found in classrooms, especially in the university area, where 20–30% of the population consists of students, and has a 0% illiteracy rate. It is the home of the University of the Andes, one of the most respected universities in the country, and the second to oldest. Mérida also contains various institutions of higher educations such as universities, university centers, polytechnic institutes, and university colleges, among others.

=== Universities ===
The University of the Andes, the most important in the city, was established in 1785, and offers undergraduate programs in art, sciences, literature, and humanities, long and short programs, as well as courses, degrees, post-graduate programs, specializations, diplomas, etc., bringing together more than 40,000 students and 6,000 professors. The university operates two campuses in Mérida, and about a dozen faculties spread throughout the city.

Two other more recently founded universities are based in Mérida: the Universidad Nacional Abierta (UNA), which offers undergraduate distance-learning courses; and, from 2006, the UNEFA, which is a military university specializing in Engineering for undergraduates. The main university centers to be found in the city are given below:

- University of the Andes (ULA)
- Universidad Nacional Abierta (UNA)
- Universidad Nacional Experimental de las Fuerzas Armadas (UNEFA)
- Santiago Mariño Polytechnic Institute (IUPSM)
- Colegio Universitario Hotel Escuela de Los Andes Venezolanos (CUHELAV)
- Santiago de los Caballeros de Mérida Institute (ISCM)
- Antonio José de Sucre University Institute
- Cristóbal Mendoza Technological University Institute
- La Frontera Technological Institute (IUFRONT)

=== Primary and Secondary Education ===
There are many institutions dedicated to primary and secondary education, most of which are public, under the control of the national or regional governments. Of particular note is the Liceo Libertador. The largest education centers in the city can be found among the many private Catholic schools. Colegio La Salle de Mérida and Colegio San Luis are among the largest with several hundred pupils each. These are run by governing bodies Fundación La Salle and Fundación Don Bosco, respectively. However, all schools come ultimately under the auspices of the Venezuelan Ministry of Education.

Other educational institutions worth mentioning are the schools dedicated to languages, sport and music. Mérida is known as a destination to learn Spanish. In 2007 Jakera Spanish School was voted by the language industry (STAR awards) as one of the top four Spanish schools worldwide. There are important conservatories, orchestras and choirs based in the city. Most are linked to the universities and specialize in many kinds of instruments, as well as lyrical interpretation and the development of the singing voice. Amongst the language schools, of predominance are those that teach English, though French and Italian schools can also be found.

=== Libraries ===
The greatest network of libraries is that of the University of the Andes. Each school has a specialized library, as well as the multidisciplinary libraries located in La Hechicera, the sports division, the administrative division, and a number of other smaller libraries, adding up to more than a dozen under the direction of Serbiula. Moreover, ULA owns the largest digital archive of the country, available to the public for research and education.

Besides the university libraries, Mérida has the Biblioteca Bolivariana (Bolivarian Library), which is also an area of exhibits and historical displays, a branch of the National Library of Venezuela, and the public library Simón Bolívar, subsidized by the government. Other public and private institutions such as schools, churches, and language institutes have their own minor libraries to be used by their members.

Additionally, land originally set aside for a metropolitan library in 2006 was reallocated for the use of National Experimental University of the Armed Forces, and a new site for the proposed library has yet to be granted.

== Culture ==
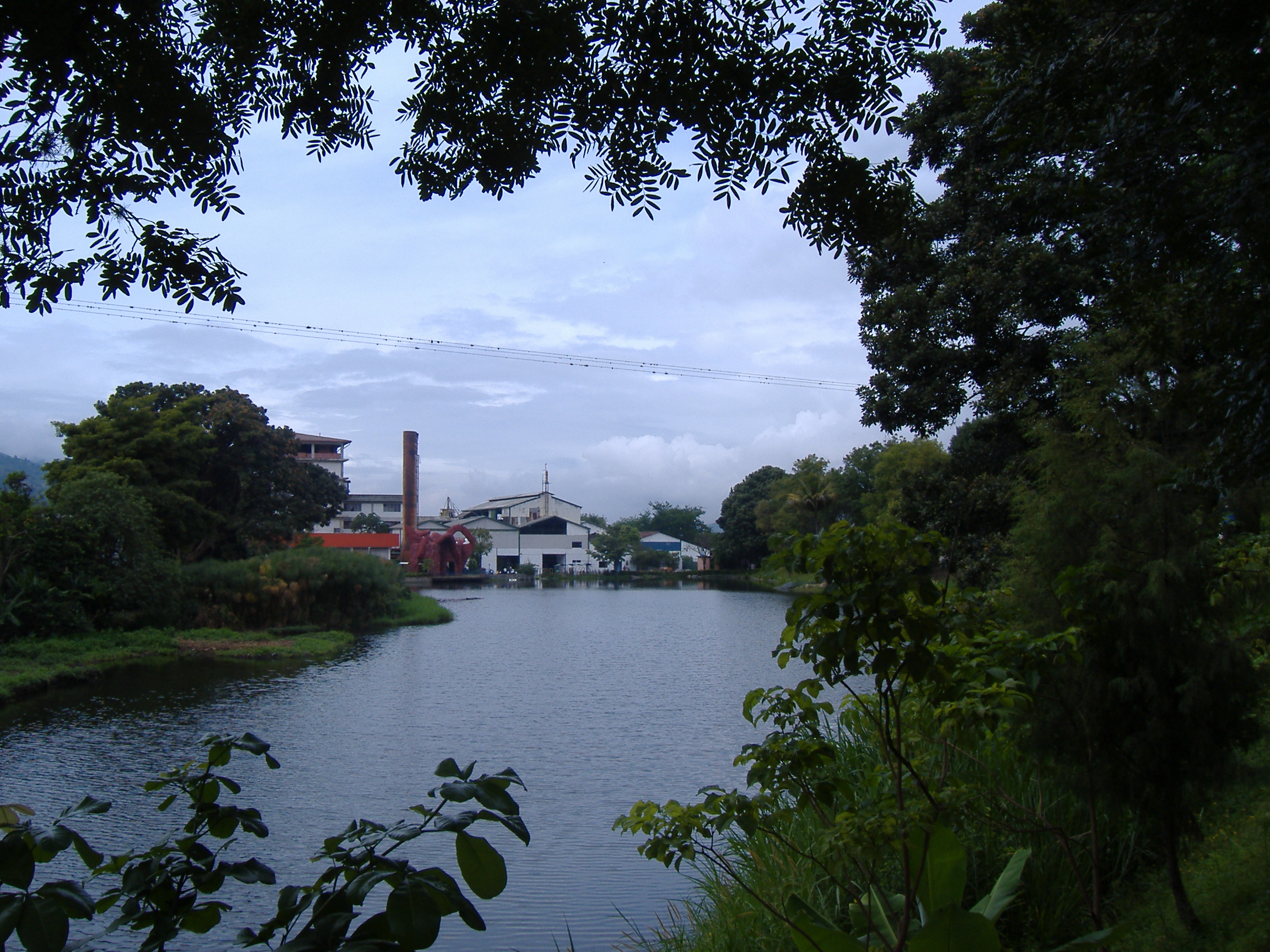
Lake La Rosa and the Museum of Science and Technology in the background

The city's culture closely resembles that of Andean Folklore and is in fact the main, if not defining, example of this folklore. Inhabitants of Mérida, with deep connections to their culture, are characterized by their preserved traditions and slow, unhurried way of life. The city itself can be recognized by its many well-preserved colonial parks and buildings, in addition to its famous social scene, the local art and craftwork, and the unique regional cuisine.

=== Museums, cultural centers, and theaters ===
- Archaeological Museum
- Archdiocesan Museum
- Museum of Science and Technology
- Museum of Colonial Art
- Museum of Modern Art
- Juan Félix Sánchez House of Culture
- Tulio Febres Cordero Cultural Center
- César Renginfo Theater

Not many know that the Archdiocesan Museum of Mérida houses the second and third oldest bells in the world, the so-called Ave María bell from the year 909 and San Pedro of 912.

=== Festivals and local customs ===
Date	Event
February 1 – 2	Christ Child's Standing
February 2	Candelaria Virgin Feasts
February	Sun Fairs
Holy Week	Christ's Living Passion
May–June	Corpus Christi Feasts
August 8	Coronation of Our Lady of the Snows
December 8	Immaculate Conception Feasts
December 31	Burning of the Past Year

In addition to national holidays and events, several festivals take place and have origins in Mérida. Most are religious celebrations, and a few – such as the city's famous "Feria del Sol" or "Sun Fair" that takes place in the beginning of February – are of an international scale.

For Mérida, the most important and famous religious traditions are those celebrated by the city's Christian devotees during Christmas and Holy Week. These festivities include La Quema del Año Viejo (Burning of the Past Year), La Pasión Viviente de Cristo (Christ's Living Passion) and La Paradura del Niño (Christ Child's Standing) celebrated with prayers, song, fireworks, wine and cake.

Another of the more popular local customs (those without official government sanction) are the Caravanas Estudiantiles, student processionals organized by and for high school or university graduates upon earning their degree. In recent years, this tradition has been extended to include younger students who have completed their primary or elementary education. Such celebrations usually occur during the first days of June for high school graduates, and throughout nearly the entire year for college graduates. Similar festivities can be found in other parts of the country, but the Caravanas of Mérida have a special relevance and importance given the city's large student population.

Other customs firmly rooted in the Méridan tradition, usually associated with fixed dates, include Patinatas Navideñas or "Christmas skating", which occurs in the city streets throughout the month of December; the Fiesta de las Velas on December 7 when in the evening all the electricity is turned off and some 18,000 candles are lit; the Fiesta de San Benito between January 12 and 31 celebrated with a drummers processions and street dancing; or the Vasallos de la Candelaria, another typical festivity with children and street dancing.

=== Cuisine ===
The cuisine of the Mérida region differs notably from that of the rest of the nation. Among the most notable differences is the arepa andina (Andean Arepa), a variant of the traditional Venezuelan arepa made from wheat flour instead of the more common corn. This difference in ingredients is due primarily to the fact that the Andean region was one of the few places in the country where wheat historically has been harvested. Another notable dish is the pizca andina, common to Mérida, Táchira and the Colombian Andes, a soup with potato, milk, long onion, and parsley. Other important dishes are prepared with trout, the only fish found in the region.

The city's typical brightened sweets, made from a base of milk and other ingredients, are also notable. There is a historical tradition of such sweets, which are said to originate in the convents where they were prepared in the 19th century. Also, one can find alfajores, aliados, and almojabanas. Popular drinks include corn liquor, mistella, and "donkey's milk", which is known as "Andean punch."

=== Music ===
The traditional music of the city is marked by waltz rhythms. It also includes regional or national rhythms, such as pasillos, a type of merengue and bambucos. The music of Mérida, like its people, is recognizable by the laid back rhythms. The use of the violin and mandolin are almost mandatory in the music style. Additionally, the city is commonly the birthplace of many rock and punk bands, among other genres. The city is also home to the Mérida State Symphony Orchestra.

== Entertainment and tourism ==
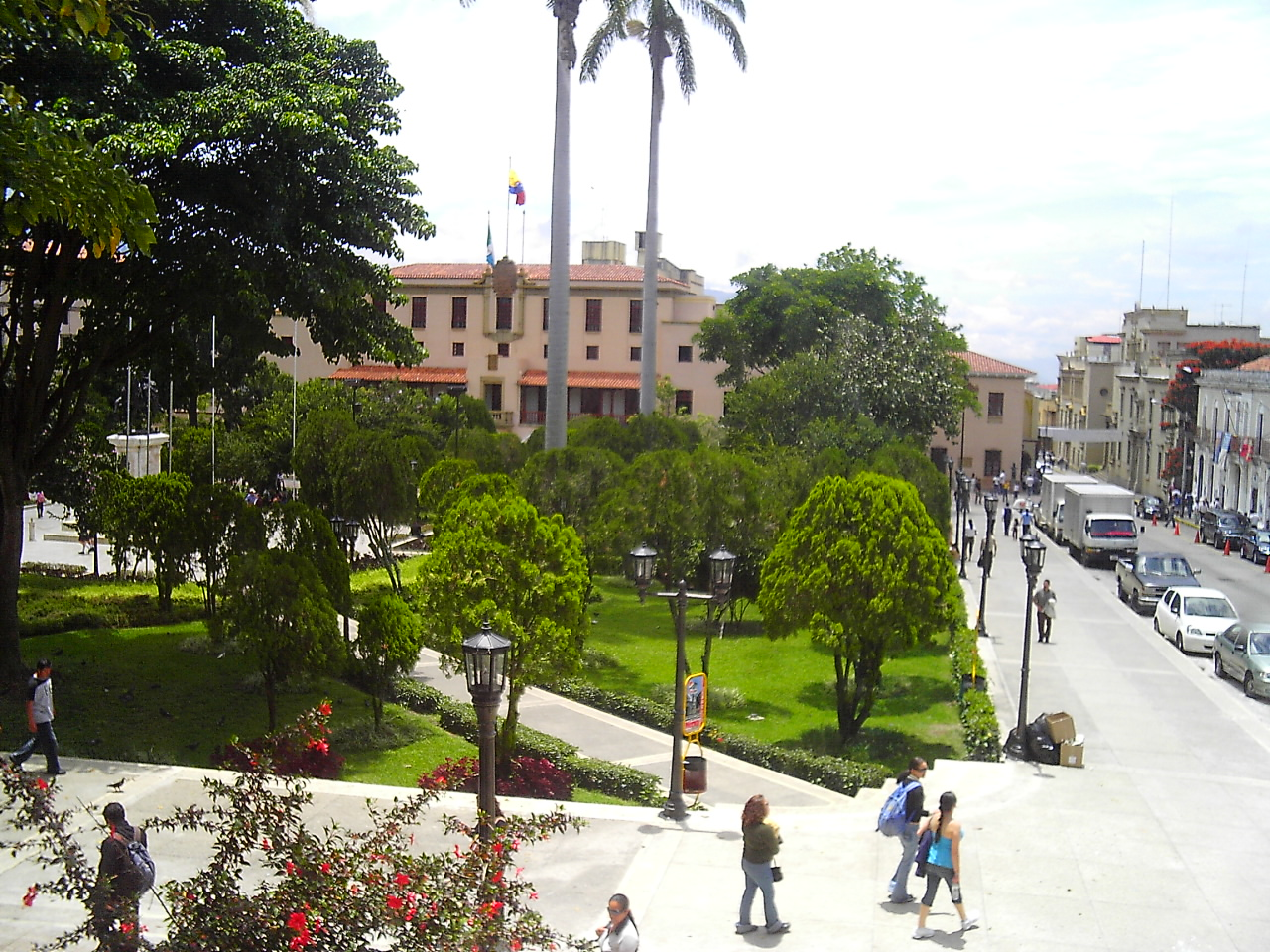
Plaza Bolívar: Mérida is known for being a safe and relaxing city with a pleasant disposition

Mérida is the quintessential touristic city in Venezuela, being one of the most sought-after destinations by national and international travelers.

=== Hotels ===
Lodging accommodations can be found to fit all budgets, including pensions and apartments for tourists with basic amenities. At least half of the hotels are located within the city, which is about 35% of the total number statewide. All in all, there are about 2,650 beds available. Moreover, there will be three large five-star hotels added before 2007, when Mérida becomes the host of the soccer event Copa América.

=== Shops ===
The main commercial area of Mérida lies within the historic downtown. However, many services can be found in the suburbs. Two notable destinations by locals and tourists alike are Mérida's Mercado Principal (Main Market) and the Heladería Coromoto (Coromoto Ice cream Parlor). The Mercado Principal is famous for its variety of folk art, gastronomy, produce, groceries, and other local and regional goods. Heladería Coromoto is well known because it offers the greatest variety of ice cream flavors worldwide, with more than 800 choices.

=== Shopping malls ===
For those who like to go shopping and spend the day enjoying stores or food courts, Mérida offers the following shopping malls: Las Tapias and Millenium located in Andrés Bello Avenue; Alto Prado and Pie de Monte located in Los Próceres Avenue; and Rodeo Plaza located in Las Américas Avenue.

=== Nightlife ===
As a city with many students and tourists, Mérida enjoys a broad network of places open at night, mostly composed of clubs and bars. There are also various cafés, restaurants, and two movie theaters. Furthermore, a number of cultural events constantly take place in these locations. Notable among these events are the concerts of the Symphonic Orchestra of Mérida, as well as concerts by local bands. Many of the night-clubs and discos open until late at night, with a few of them staying open until sunrise.

== Media and communication ==
=== Television ===
There are three television stations which broadcast from Mérida. Two of these are general-interest stations, airing programs including news, entertainment, and culture. The third is an institutional and educational channel and belongs to the Universidad de Los Andes.

The stations are:

- Televisora Andina de Mérida, (TAM)
- ULATV

=== Radio ===
The principal radio stations of the state also broadcast from Mérida. These stations are mostly privately owned, though in recent years some public community radio stations have emerged.

=== Press ===
Some of the best-known newspapers from Mérida are:

- El Correo de Los Andes
- Cambio de Siglo
- Diario Frontera
- Diario Pico Bolívar
- Cultura Tatuy

== Sports ==
Mérida has a strong athletic infrastructure; noteworthy among others is the Guillermo Soto Rosa Stadium, an important soccer facility and the old headquarters of the local soccer team. During the last month of 2005, the city was host to the 2005 Andean National Games, an event for which numerous athletic facilities were built, including the Cinco Águilas Blancas (Five White Eagles) Sports Complex—a 42 000-seat stadium and the current home stadium of the local team, Estudiantes de Mérida F. C. Soccer is the most popular and widely supported sport, but given the city's location, a variety of extreme sports are also practiced.

In addition to the aforementioned soccer, the current athletic infrastructure also supports a wide array of other traditional sports, including tennis, basketball, baseball, and Venezuelan sports such as bolas criollas.

The Metropolitan Stadium of Mérida, dedicated on May 25, 2007, with a friendly match between Venezuela and Honduras, was host to the 2007 Copa América.

== See also ==
- Mérida (state)
- Libertador Municipality, Mérida
- Category:People from Mérida, Mérida
