= Block of Wikipedia in Venezuela =

2019 block of Wikipedia in Venezuela

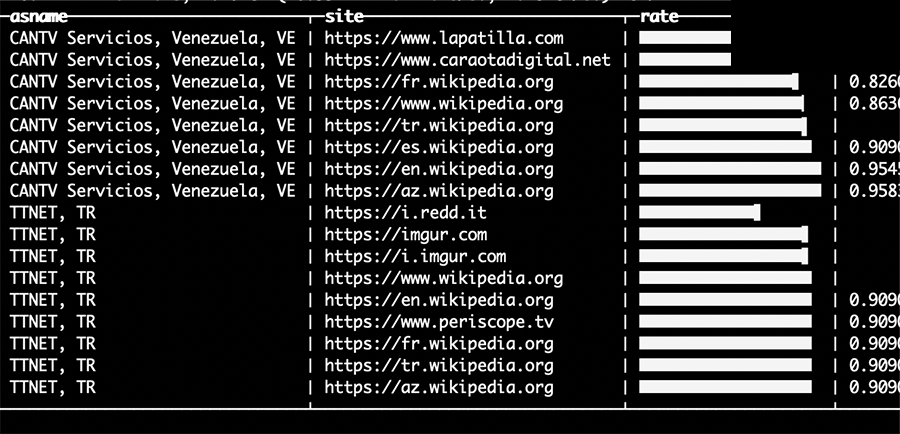
- NetBlocks report of the progress of Wikipedia being blocked in Venezuela by CANTV for 12 January 2019
- Date: 12–18 January 2019
- Duration: 6 days
- Location: Venezuela
- Cause: Response to Venezuelan presidential crisis
- Outcome: Affected websites unblocked

On 12 January 2019, the main telecommunications provider in Venezuela, CANTV, issued a block against the online encyclopedia, Wikipedia. All of CANTV's 1.5 million users were affected by the decision. The block was lifted on 18 January 2019, following widespread criticism against the state-owned company, claiming it was in response to the Venezuelan presidential crisis.

The block coincided with Juan Guaidó's claims to become acting president during the beginning of the Venezuelan presidential crisis. During the crisis, several Internet outages were reported as well as the blocking of multiple websites, including Wikipedia.

Wikimedia Venezuela reported another block of Wikipedia on 23 January 2019.

In July 2024, Wikipedia was again blocked in Venezuela on major private internet service providers, including Digitel and NetUno, just hours before the presidential election held on 28 July 2024, according to reporting by the Venezuelan newspaper Correo del Caroní, citing digital rights monitors.

== Context ==
The Wikipedia block occurred in the midst of several edit wars on the Spanish Wikipedia articles of Nicolás Maduro, Juan Guaidó, President of Venezuela and List of presidents of Venezuela. The edit wars were in conflict over edits by both registered users and anonymous IP users, with different opinions on the re-election of Maduro as president of Venezuela from 2019, the assumption of the presidency by Guaidó, as well as about the chronology of the presidency. Initial edits claimed that Guaidó was declared president, with following wars removing this information.

== Block ==
On the afternoon of 12 January 2019, the NetBlocks Internet observatory collected technical evidence of the blocking of all versions of Wikipedia in Venezuela. The restrictions were implemented by CANTV, the largest telecommunications provider in the country. NetBlocks identified a major disruption to the network affecting the telecommunications infrastructure, which coincided with other restrictions affecting the ability of Venezuelans to access information in the previous 24 hours. It was believed that the reason was an attempt to hide or suppress the Wikipedia article of the newly appointed president of the National Assembly, Juan Guaidó, who included him as "51st President of the Bolivarian Republic of Venezuela." The information collected also shows several websites that had recently been restricted, meaning that political instability in the country may be the main motive for the control of the Internet.

The Observatory VE without filters (Spanish: VE sin Filtro) also collected information about the block, showing that it was an irregularly effective block, an HTTP filtering block according to the SNI (Server Name Indication), preventing a connection to the server from being established with high frequency. The group reported that they thought that the block had ended on 13 January at 4:50pm, but the blocking methods showed up later, and they deleted the tweet with the incorrect information.

Similarly, several media outlets suggested that Wikipedia directly or indirectly was taking sides with either group. (Note: Some media that accuse Wikipedia of taking sides are: Venezuelan media: Noticiero Digital, Venepress, Diario 2001, Venezuela al Día, El Impulso, Efecto Cocuyo, and EP MUNDO.; Foreign media: Bio Bio Chile and La Nación.)

== Reactions ==
=== Wikimedia Foundation ===
On January 13, 2019, the Wikimedia Foundation declared that it would start an investigation to understand what really happened, as until the day of their statement, it continued to receive traffic from visits and edits coming from Venezuela.

=== Government of Venezuela ===
On January 15, 2019, Venezuelan President Nicolás Maduro spoke about Wikipedia and expressed that the Venezuelan opposition "intends to seize political power and become the president of the republic of Wikipedia, of the Twitter republic," referring to the edit war that occurred due to the appointment of Juan Guaidó as president during the presidential crisis. Maduro added, "Let them keep their Wikipedia, with their Twitter."

So far, the only response the Venezuelan government has given about the Wikipedia blockade was offered on January 18 by William Castillo, Vice Minister of International Communication, to the digital media outlet eldiario.es. Castillo stated that "there is no blockade of Wikipedia in Venezuela," attributing the access difficulties reported by users of the public operator to a possible "denial-of-service attack (DOS) carried out by third parties, in the context of the political and communicational destabilization operations underway in Venezuela that aim, among other things, to damage the country's image." Castillo also assured that the two possibilities of legally blocking a website in Venezuela are through an administrative process that must be notified to all involved parties "and which obliges listening to the corresponding versions" or through a judicial blockade, affirming that "neither of these conditions has occurred in the case of Wikipedia."

=== Wikimedia Venezuela ===
In a statement, Wikimedia Venezuela indicated:

During the last 72 hours, volunteers from the non-profit civil association of Wikipedia have reported their inability to access the free encyclopedia through the most important Internet service provider in Venezuela, the state company CANTV.

— Wikimedia Venezuela. Excerpt from About the blockade of Venezuela, official statement, January 16, 2019.

On January 16, 2019, Wikimedia Venezuela asked the Venezuelan government to unblock access to Wikipedia in Venezuela.

Some users informed Wikimedia Venezuela that the blockade ended on January 18, 2019, Wikimedia is trying to confirm this fact.

==== Human rights violations in 2022 ====
On October 17, 2022, Óscar Costero, a well-known Wikipedian, appeared at the main office of the Administrative Service for Identification, Migration, and Immigration (Saime) in Caracas after facing online difficulties renewing his passport. What seemed like a mere administrative procedure turned into a series of human rights violations.

Upon arrival, he was informed of a supposed "prohibition to leave the country". A staff member, who did not want to be identified, kept him waiting for hours and finally forced him to sign a statement indicating that he was being investigated and had not been mistreated during his stay at Saime. This situation escalated quickly when, without prior notice, he was detained by the Scientific, Penal, and Criminal Investigations Corps (CICPC) and taken for interrogation.

The questions revolved around his personal life, finances, and his affiliation with Wikimedia, as well as his relationship with Santiago De Viana, an editor of political topics on Wikipedia. It was revealed that De Viana had been the target of defamation, accused of corruption, and links to drug trafficking. In this defamation, Costero was also mentioned.

This series of events is related to a persecution that began after the blackout of 2019, intensifying towards the end of that year against Costero, De Viana, and Wikimedia Venezuela. Despite being released, Costero faced restrictions on his free movement and continuous denial of his fundamental rights.

On November 11, 2022, lawyers from Espacio Público tried to access the case file but faced obstacles from the judicial authorities. The irregularities in the case accumulated, including the lack of information about specific charges and the rejection of a protection request filed in January 2023.

Despite the judicial decision alleging that no harmful act had been committed against Costero, it is evident that his rights to due process, freedom of association, free expression, and free movement were violated. These events clearly demonstrate the judicial persecution against Costero and De Viana.

Óscar Costero's defense has repeatedly demanded full access to the case file, emphasizing that his rights have already been severely violated. Freedom of association and expression are essential for a democratic society and its progress. The Venezuelan state is urged to respect and guarantee these fundamental rights in line with its international commitments.

==== Controversy on Wikipedia ====
Tension arose due to an editorial conflict over the biographical profile of Juan Guaidó on Wikipedia. The editors failed to reach a consensus on whether Guaidó should be recognized as president of Venezuela. This "edit war" led the government to temporarily block access to Wikipedia in the country. Although Wikimedia Venezuela requested clarity on the reasons for the blockade, access was restored a week later without an official explanation.

==== Detention and due process violation ====
In October 2022, Oscar Costero was arbitrarily detained while trying to renew his passport. During his detention, he was questioned about his personal life, finances, and his relationship with Wikimedia and Santiago De Viana. This act was denounced by the NGO Espacio Público, which considered the detention a violation of due process. It is also alleged that Costero was baselessly accused of money laundering and incitement to hatred.

==== Defamation campaign ====
De Viana was particularly susceptible to defamation due to a pseudonym he used on Wikipedia, which was closely linked to his real name. As a result, an anonymous blog campaign was launched, labeling him as a "Wikipedia extortionist". These unverified reports also linked the editors to drug trafficking activities.

==== Repercussion and response ====
The NGO Espacio Público has actively defended Óscar Costero's rights, demanding transparency and access to the case file. The organization emphasizes the importance of freedom of expression and association, highlighting how they are essential for the existence of a democratic society.

The case of Costero and De Viana illustrates the precarious situation of freedom of expression in certain regions and highlights the challenges faced by those who contribute to the dissemination of free and objective information.

== See also ==
- 2019 Venezuelan presidential crisis
- Block of Wikipedia in Turkey
- Censorship in Venezuela
- Censorship of Wikipedia
