= Luz Mely Reyes =

Venezuelan journalist, writer, and analyst

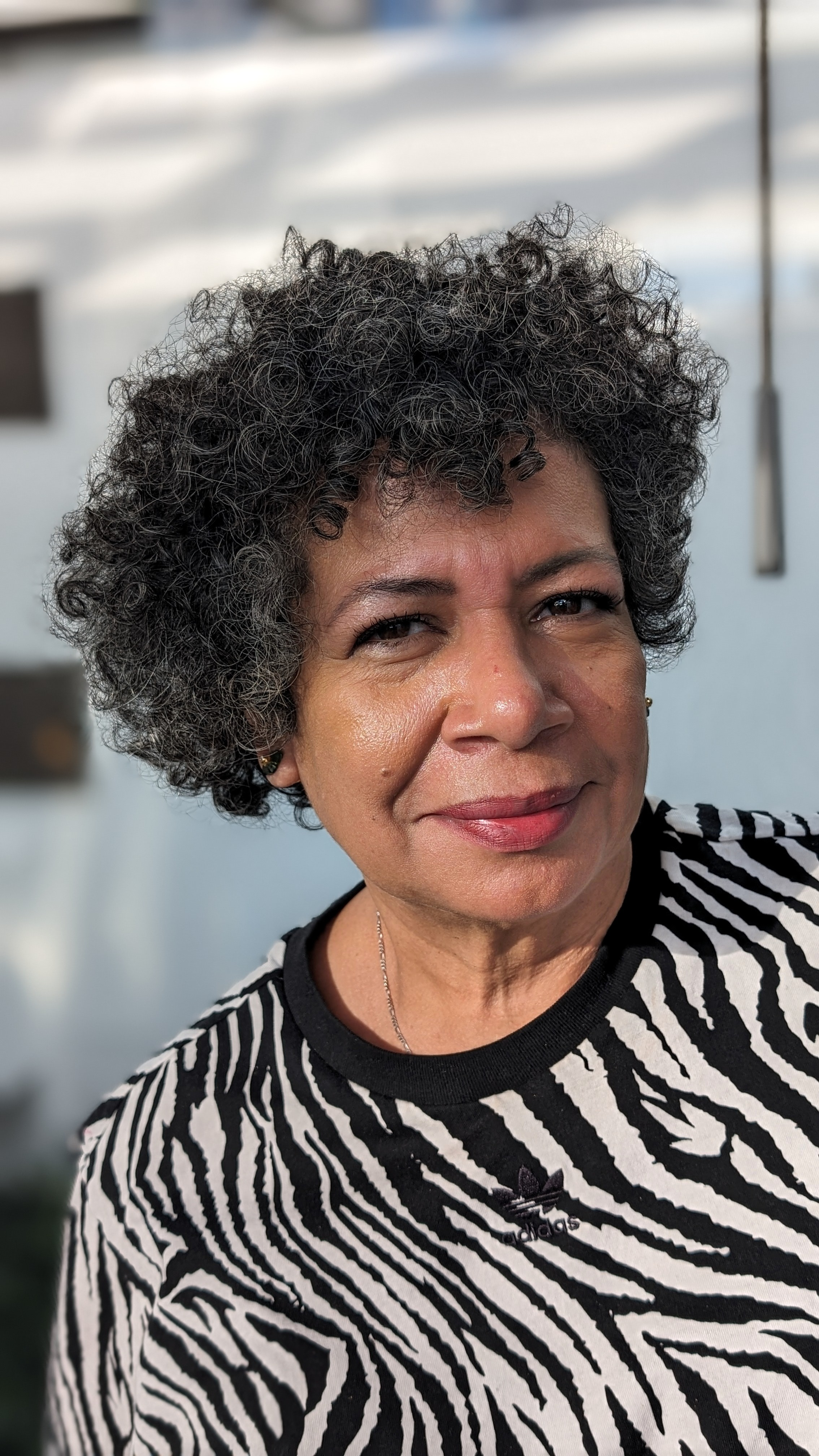
- Luz Mely Reyes in 2024
- Born: 1967 (age 57–58); Caracas, Venezuela
- Occupation(s): Journalist, writer, analyst

Luz Mely Reyes (born 1967) is a Venezuelan journalist, writer, and analyst. She is known as the director and co-founder of the digital media franchise Efecto Cocuyo. She has received multiple honors for her work.

== Education ==
Reyes grew up in an impoverished area of Caracas, and so her main aim was to escape poverty, never dreaming of being a journalist. She did not think it was the right job for her, either, but a professor convinced her to study Social Communication. In her first two semesters of it she still did not feel it was a fit.

She graduated with a degree in Social Communication from the Central University of Venezuela. She has a Master's degree in Organizational communication and Journalism from the Universidad Católica Andrés Bello. In 2016, she took a course in Entrepreneurial Journalism at CUNY, studying in the English language. She was an international prize scholar of the Konrad Adenauer Foundation and won a grant from the Organization of American States to do a one-month course on Andean Integration at the Pontifical Xavierian University in Bogotá.

Reyes has been a professor of postgraduate studies in Political communication at Simón Bolívar University (USB).

== Career ==
Interviewing Juan Guaidó during the 2019 Venezuelan presidential crisis

Reyes started her career as a sports journalist for the paper Últimas Noticias, which she did not relate with much. Later, she worked for El Aragüeño, where she was assigned to politics, which she was fond of and became one of her main sources of interest.

In one interview, she said that it was only in February 1992 that she was "baptized" as a journalist. That was when she covered the February 1992 coup attempt against Carlos Andrés Pérez. She confessed, "I didn't know that a coup was coming, I was too jojota [green]." That was her first day on the job, insisting she had to leave the house to go to work; it marked her career.

In 2002, she became the Political Editor of Últimas Noticias. She was promoted to be Head of the Investigation Group, a role she held for ten years. She led the election project "Tuvoto2012" ("Your vote 2012") across the Cadena Capriles for a year. After that, she became director of Diario 2001 in 2014.

In 2015, with colleagues Laura Weffer and Josefina Ruggiero she created a new independent digital media body, Efecto Cocuyo, with the slogan "Journalism that illuminates". The idea for the website came after incidents where the founders had been persecuted for attempting journalistic freedom; Reyes herself was arraigned by the government for writing a piece about gasoline shortages in Venezuela.

== Publications ==
=== Books and blog ===
- Con la vagina bien puesta (With the vagina well-placed), 2006. About the relation of women to society and the importance of physical appearance.
- Marketing político: Herramientas para ganar elecciones (Political marketing: Tools to win elections), 2003. Written with Carmen Beatriz Fernández about the use of political marketing.
- Politikom Real, (since 2002) digital column (blog) for analysis and political opinions.

=== Notable reports and investigations ===
- Micabú Case (in collaboration with Gerardo Reyes) about irregularities in the contract for printing the constitutional text in 2000.
- Corrupción en el secuestro del "canciller" de las FARC, Rodrigo Granda (Corruption in the kidnapping of the FARC "councilor" Rodrigo Granda) in 2005, about the titular disappearance which caused the Rodrigo Granda affair, a diplomatic crisis between Colombia and Venezuela.
- Acts of Corruption in the 2007 Iran-Venezuela Project.

== Recognition ==
In 2014 she received the Napolitan Victory Award for merit in Latin-American political journalism.

She was included in the list of the 30 most influential female academics in Iberoamerica in 2017 by Esglobal.

In 2018 the Committee to Protect Journalists awarded Reyes the International Press Freedom Award. In her acceptance speech she noted that there were many other journalists killed and imprisoned that year and mentioned the fact that in 25 years of political journalism she only had to start wearing protective clothing in 2017, though she had faced government intimidation and jail threats before.

The 2018 Time Person of the Year was "The Guardians" – journalists refusing to stand down despite being persecuted for reporting the truth. Though not one of the four primary recipients of the honor, Reyes was spotlighted in the full feature.

== Personal life ==
Reyes has a husband, Denis, and a son, Ivan, who is a photojournalist.
