= Pynchas Brener =

Venezuelan rabbi (born 1931)

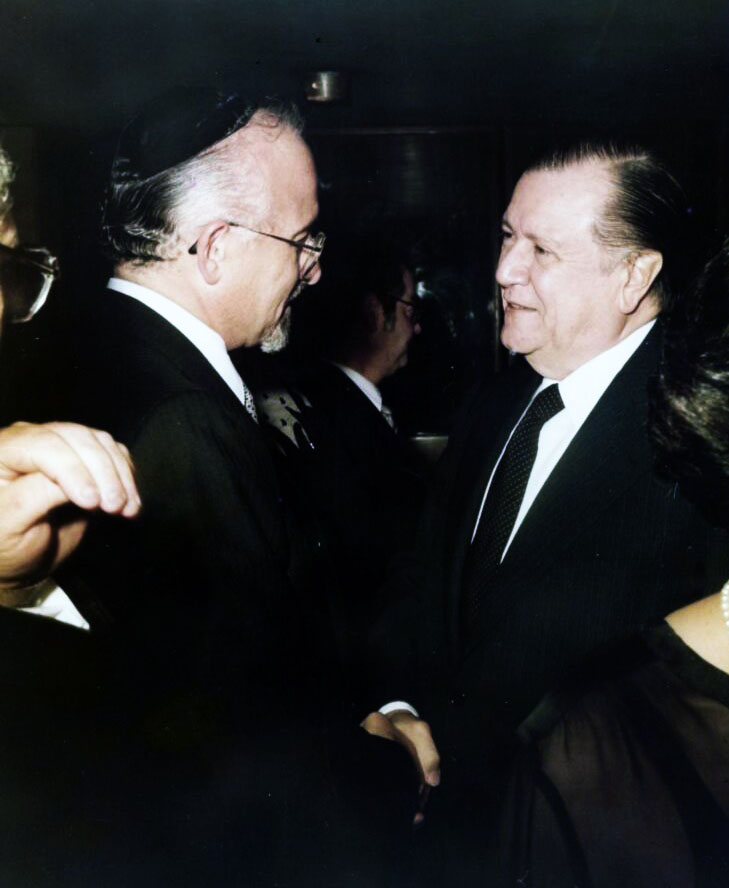
- Brener with President Rafael Caldera in 1980.
- Title: Ashkenazi Chief Rabbi of Caracas, Venezuela

Personal life
- Born: 1931 (age 94–95) Tyszowce, Poland

Religious life
- Religion: Judaism
- Website: http://www.pynchasbrener.com

Pynchas Brener (born 1931) is the Ashkenazi Chief Rabbi of Caracas, Venezuela, starting in 1967.

== Early life ==
He was born in Tyszowce, Poland and at the age of four emigrated with his family to Peru. He received his Bachelor of Arts and Rabbinic Ordination from Yeshiva University and his Master's degree from Columbia University, and is a PhD honoris causa of Bar Ilan University.

== Rabbinic career ==
In the 1960s, Brener served as a rabbi in Queens, New York. In 1967 he was appointed as Ashkenazi Chief Rabbi of Caracas.

In August 2019, the disputed president of Venezuela, Juan Guaidó, appointed Brener as the official envoy to Israel, even though the two countries do not have diplomatic relations.

Brener is a president of the Committee of Liaisons between Churches and Synagogues in Venezuela and member of the Board of Directors of Bar Ilan University in Israel. He is the author of several books about Judaism, including El Diálogo Eterno, Las Escrituras: Hombres e Ideas, and Fe y Razón, all published by the World Zionist Organization's Department for Education and Culture in the Diaspora. He has also written Tradición y Actualidad and Luto y Consuelo, published by Editorial Boker, and La fe y la Intuición, published by Monte Ávila Editores in Caracas. He also co-edited with Marianne Beker and Thea Segal, the book Las sinagogas se abren al mundo

He is also a regular columnist in the Venezuelan newspapers such as El Nacional, El Universal and the Venezuelan Jewish community weekly newspaper Nuevo Mundo Israelita.

He is a classmate and close friend of Rabbi Arthur Schneier of Park East Synagogue. He has an internet project "Cafe con Fe" and a website. His digital platform has been running since 2012 and has a presence on Facebook, Youtube, and Twitter.
