= Meridiano de Oro =

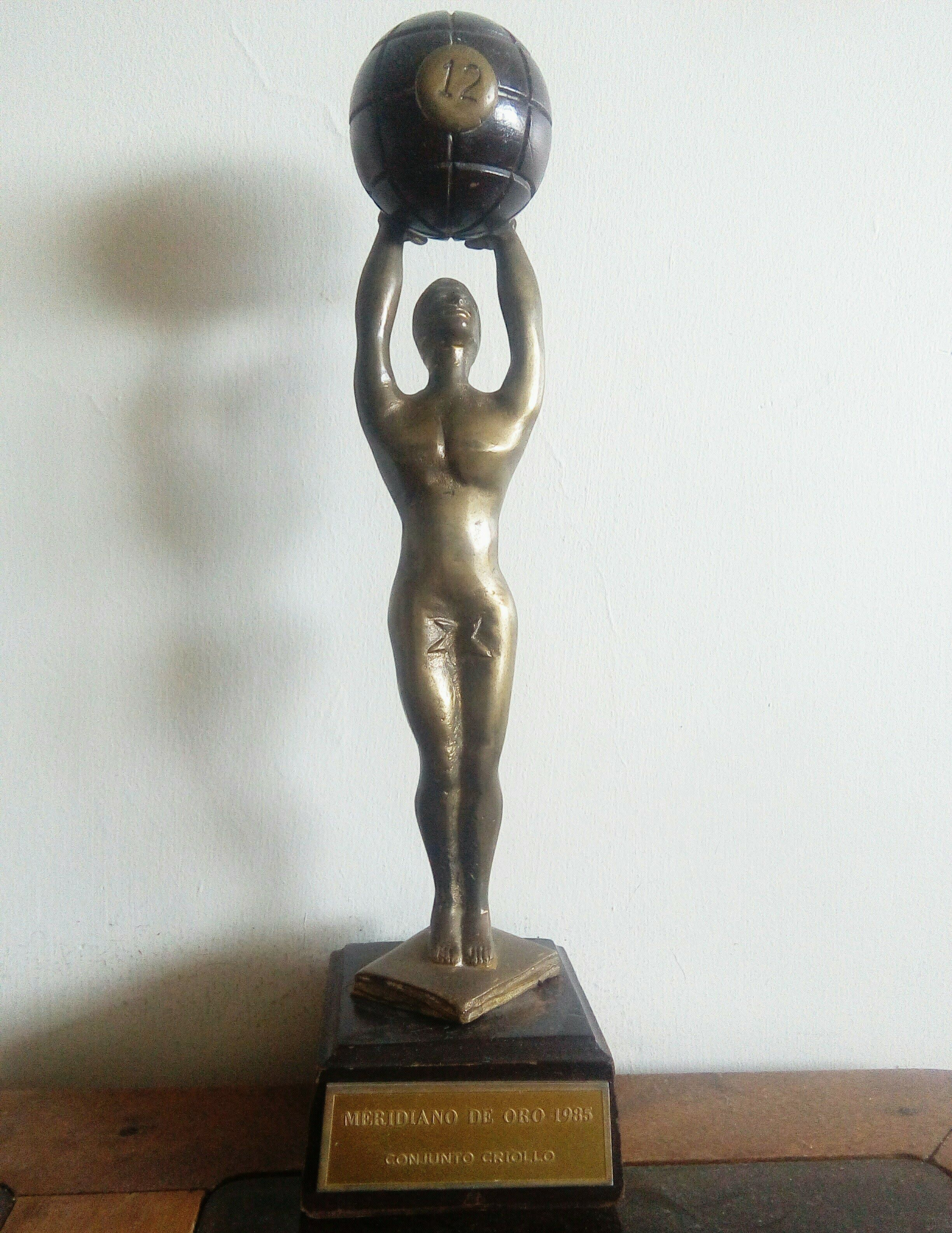
- The Meridiano de Oro
- Awarded for: Excellence in the television industry
- Country: Venezuela
- Presented by: Bloque De Armas
- First award: May 16, 1970; 56 years ago
- Website: https://meridiano.net

The Meridiano de Oro prize (also called Venezuelan Oscar), is an award granted by the Dearmas Block in recognition of the excellence of professionals in the "world of spectacle," including journalists, announcers, actors, theatre groups, and TV channels. It was widely considered the country's highest honor of its kind.

The awards are considered one of the most prominent and prestigious ceremonies in Venezuela. They are broadcast live annually. It is the award ceremony with the longest existence and reach. It equivalents: the Ronda Awards (for music), the Mara de Oro awards (for various media), among others, have followed the original's format.

The Meridiano de Oro was created by the Bloque De Armas. Awards are awarded based on online voting by the general public. Granted through popular consultation, which was made through coupons circulated in the pages of newspapers Meridiano and Diario in 2001.

== History ==
The first ceremony was held on May 16, 1970. The nominees were announced a few days before the ceremony.

In the 1995 awards, the award for Best Foreign Actor category was introduced. Earlier, these actors were awarded a special prize.

== Statuette ==
The statuette is gold-plated on a wooden base, approximately 30 centimeters high and 2.5 kilograms in weight. It depicts a naked person, in Art Deco style, holding a divided globe with meridians and parallel divisions, with a white circle in the center indicating the number 12.

Meridiano de Oro is named after the Meridiano.

Early ceremonies were broadcast live by Venevisión followed by Rock Canyon Television RCTV.

== Recipients ==
- Daniela Alvarado

== See also ==
- List of newspapers in Venezuela
- Venezuela
- History of Venezuela
