= Capriles (surname) =

Capriles is a Spanish surname. Notable people with the surname include:

- Aníbal Capriles Cabrera (1854–1924), Bolivian professor, journalist and politician
- Carlos Capriles Ayala (1923–2014), Venezuelan journalist and historian
- Colette Capriles, Venezuelan political scientist
- Gloria Lizárraga de Capriles (1944–2021), Venezuelan politician
- Henrique Capriles (born 1972), Venezuelan politician and lawyer
- José Raoul de Capriles (1912–1969), American foil and épée fencer
- Miguel Ángel Capriles Ayala (1915–1996), head of Venezuela's Cadena Capriles media group
- Miguel de Capriles (1906–1981), Mexican-born American fencer
- Téodoro Capriles (born 1945), Venezuelan former swimmer

== See also ==
- Capriles (disambiguation)
- Caprile (surname)
