= El Informador =

El Informador is the name of two Latin American newspapers:

- El Informador (Mexico)
- El Informador (Barquisimeto), Venezuela
