= Carlos Capriles Ayala =

Venezuelan historian, writer and diplomat

Ambassador to Spain
- In office 1969–1972
- President: Rafael Caldera
- Succeeded by: Tomás Polanco Alcántara

Personal details
- Born: 16 March 1923 Puerto Cabello, Carabobo, Venezuela
- Died: 10 February 2014 (aged 90) Madrid, Spain
- Spouse: Evangelina Méndez de Capriles
- Profession: Journalist, Historian

Carlos Capriles Ayala (Note: In this name that follows Hispanic American naming customs, the first or paternal surname is Capriles and the second or maternal family name is Ayala.) (16 March 1923 – 10 February 2014) was a Venezuelan journalist and historian who served as ambassador to Spain during Rafael Caldera's presidency. He was the co-founder along with his brother, Miguel Ángel Capriles Ayala, of La Cadena Capriles, Capriles Publications and was Vice-President from 1950 to 1977. Founding editor of the Maracaibo daily Crítica (1965–68), el "Vespertino de Maracaibo", news magazines "Elite" and "Momento" and lastly "El Mundo" tabloid.

He was the author of two books, including a biography of Venezuelan dictator Marcos Pérez Jiménez. He co-authored the three-volume Diccionario de la corrupción en Venezuela ("Dictionary of Corruption in Venezuela"). He protagonized and fomented the defence for free expression, free press and the constitution of the democracy in Venezuela. He was politically persecuted during the dictatorship of Marcos Pérez Jiménez, during which he was thrown in jail and afterwards sent into exile. His thirst for adventure was expressed by his arrival to Spain as Venezuelan ambassador in the early 1970s, by crossing the Atlantic Ocean sailing his beloved VITO sailboat. In his role as ambassador, Capriles signed several peace treaties and was awarded several decorations, like the Great Order of Hispanic Culture Institute, the Order of Liberatator of Venezuela and the Knight Grand Cross of Spain's Order of Isabella the Catholic in 1972. Carlos Capriles Ayala died on 10 February 2014.

He graduated in history from the Central University of Venezuela. He is the brother of Miguel Ángel Capriles Ayala.

== Books ==
- Vida y muerte de la democracia: López Contreras y Medina Angaria vs. Rómulo Betancourt y Pérez Jiménez, 1999, Ediciones Capriles.
- Origen de la corrupción en Venezuela, desde Páez hasta Caldera, 1996, Ediciones Capriles.
- Decadas de historia de Venezuela, 1994, Ediciones Capriles. ISBN 978-9806201262
- Todos los golpes a la democracia venezolana, 1992, Ediciones Capriles. 978-9806201187
- Sexo y poder en la historia: Concubinas reales y presidenciales en Venezuela desde Manuelita Saenz hasta Cecilia Matos, 1991 (6th edition), Ediciones Capriles. ISBN 978-9806201156
- Sola, a traves de la selva amazonica, 1988, Ediciones Bexeller. ISBN 978-9806201002
- Un burdel de postin: Una historia de novela, 1988, Ediciones Bexeller. ISBN 978-9806201057
- Perez Jimenez y su tiempo: Biografia del ex-presidente y radiografia de Venezuela en algunas etapas estelares de su historia, 1985. Three Volumes. ISBN 978-9802658763
