= Lord Hanson =

Lord Hanson may refer to:

- James Hanson, Baron Hanson (1922–2004), British businessman and Conservative politician
- David Hanson, Baron Hanson of Flint (born 1957), British Labour politician

== See also ==
- George Anson, 1st Baron Anson (1697–1762), Royal Navy officer and politician
