= Capriles =

Capriles may refer to:

- Capriles (surname), Spanish-language surname
- Cadena Capriles, Venezuelan media company
- Estadio Félix Capriles, multi-purpose stadium in Cochabamba, Bolivia

== See also ==
- Caprile (disambiguation)
