= El Mundo (Venezuela) =

Venezuelan newspaper

- Type: Daily newspaper
- Format: Digital
- Publisher: Cadena Capriles
- Founded: 1958
- Headquarters: Caracas; Venezuela
- Circulation: 17,000 (daily, 2007 figures)
- Website: elmundo.com.ve

El Mundo is a Venezuelan evening newspaper.

It was launched on 3 February 1958 in Caracas, shortly after the end of the dictatorship of Marcos Pérez Jiménez on 23 January 1958. It was founded by Miguel Ángel Capriles Ayala, who had launched Últimas Noticias in 1941. Its first director was journalist and future President Ramón José Velásquez.

For most of its existence El Mundo was the only Venezuelan evening newspaper; a rival, April, was launched by Bloque DeArmas in 1997 but closed in 2003. Another rival, Tal Cual, was launched by Teodoro Petkoff in 2000 after Petkoff had for a time been director of El Mundo.

On 20 February 2009, it ceased publication in printed form, with a planned relaunch as a digital-only publication scheduled for 27 April 2009.

== See also ==
- List of newspapers in Venezuela
