= Efecto Cocuyo =

Venezuelan news website

- Owners: Laura Weffer, Luz Mely Reyes y Josefina Ruggiero
- Website: Official website
- Launched: 2015
- Current status: Online

Efecto Cocuyo (English: Firefly Effect) is a Venezuelan journalism outlet devoted to independent media. The website was co-founded in January 2015 by Laura Weffer, former director of Venezuelan newspaper Diario 2001, Luz Mely Reyes, and Josefina Ruggiero, former content director of Cadena Capriles— award-winning journalists.

== History ==
Co-founder Luz Mely Reyes interviewing Juan Guaidó during the Venezuelan presidential crisis

As a response to censorship in Venezuela, alternate media began to emerge. Following the resignation of Laura Weffer due to issues with her newspaper's coverage of the 2014 Venezuelan protests, and an arraignment of Luz Mely Reyes by the Venezuelan government following a report about gasoline shortages in Venezuela, the two began to plan a new project. Their plan included the involvement of aspiring journalists and helping them grow their talents through the pair's "veteran experience". Mely Reyes said that the project grew out of "the need for many to receive accurate, timely and transparent information". Univision stated that with the loss of independent media in Venezuela, the creation of Efecto Cocuyo began to "illuminate" the country again.

On 8 January 2015, Efecto Cocuyo sent out its first tweet and received 12,000 followers on Twitter two days later. On 15 January, they announced the construction of their website after they found a local website developer and a location for a small office. As of March 2015, Efecto Cocuyo had about 40,000 Twitter followers.

On 12 September 2019, the outlet won the Human Rights award from the Washington Office on Latin America for their continued coverage of the Crisis in Venezuela.

== Funding ==
The website initially received funding through public donations and crowdfunding in 2015, with its founders seen on the streets in Venezuela asking for support. Efecto Cocuyo has since been funded by international organizations and refuses to identify its monetary sources. In a WhatDoTheyKnow freedom of information request in February 2019, the Foreign & Commonwealth Office of the United Kingdom acknowledged funding Efecto Cocuyo. Funding received goes to new-hire reporters and towards "breaking-news analysis, investigative reports and comprehensive content about crucial information".

== In popular culture ==
In cartoons depicting censorship in Venezuela and the Venezuelan government's purchase of media organizations, the owners of Efecto Cocuyo have been depicted as combating such actions; these cartoons were printed in Mexican newspapers Reforma, Mural, El Norte and about 50 other publications in the country.

== See also ==
- List of newspapers in Venezuela
