= Noticiero Digital =

Venezuelan online news website

Noticiero Digital is a Venezuelan news and opinion website headquartered in Caracas, described by Reporters Without Borders as "a popular website that is critical of President Hugo Chávez". According to its former editor, Roger Santodomingo, Noticiero Digital became popular after the government of Venezuela decided not to renew the broadcast license of cable television network RCTV, saying: "It has become [a] forum for comment that is virtually out of its own management's control because of its totally open nature." As of June 2007, it had 45,000 registered users.

== Allegations by the Venezuelan government ==
=== Funding ===
In May 2007, Noticiero Digital journalists, along with colleagues from RCTV and Globovision, were accused of being employed by the U.S. Central Intelligence Agency (CIA) to destabilize the Chávez government. The accusations were initially made by television show host Mario Silva, who claimed that the U.S. government funded the writers; the "pro-government newspaper" Diario VEA later stated that the writers were receiving CIA funding, though they deny the accusations.

Three days later Chávez supporter and writer Eva Golinger showed records that she alleges show the journalists had received "money in 2003 under specialization courses and cultural exchanges financed by several international cooperation agencies of the United States".

The journalists deny receiving funding from the CIA. The International Freedom of Expression eXchange (IFEX) says "there is no evidence of links between international cooperation agencies and the CIA"; one of the accused journalists participated in a cultural exchange program called "Investigative Journalism" and another attended a program called "The role of social communication media in democracy".

=== Editor resigns ===
In May 2007, Venezuela's Attorney General accused Noticiero Digital of "attempting to instigate the assassination of the president and of receiving funding from the US State Department to destabilize the government". Santodomingo, the former editor, said that "the investigation has been prompted by his publication of an opinion poll in which the option of assassinating President Hugo Chávez was offered as a possible response to the question: 'What is the way out of this crisis?' The option received 30 percent of the votes."

Santodomingo resigned in July 2007 after purported attacks and smears against him, and threats against his son, who was seven years old at the time. A message calling Santodomingo a "traitor to his country" was found in his son's school report card, leading Santodomingo to ask for protection for his son from the National Council for Children's Rights. A few days following his resignation, his car exploded and was destroyed outside his home.

=== Forum posts ===
In March 2010, Chávez accused Noticiero Digital forums of falsely publishing that two of Chávez's political allies had been assassinated. Calling the publication a crime, Chávez called for restrictions on speech over the Internet, and for Venezuela's attorney general to take action against Noticiero Digital. Chávez said: "The Internet can't be something free where anything can be done and said. No, every country has to impose its rules and regulations."

The magazine Variety reported that Noticiero Digital responded that the reports "were posted by unauthorized bloggers and suspect that they were planted by the government". According to Venezuela's El Universal, Noticiero Digital responded to the charges by saying that "messages in the forum are the opinions and expressions of its authors and not of the administrators or moderators" and that the two posts mentioning assassinations had been removed within hours and the users posting them permanently suspended.

The government was accused in the media of attempting to regulate the internet and a Reporters Without Borders spokesperson said the Noticiero Digital case was a "pretext for the government to legitimize the regulation of [the Internet]". Chávez inaugurated 24 community Internet centers, and, according to Business Week accused the opposition of spreading "lies about increased online censorship", saying "There’s a story around the world that I want to eliminate Internet, no, we want to transfer power and knowledge to the people through Internet. There have been counter revolutions and coups online. We need to use these tools to wage the Internet war, the online battle."

In support of Chávez, "who questioned the news website Noticiero Digital for spreading false information about the alleged death of the Minister of Public Works and Housing, Diosdado Cabello, and pro-government TV anchor Mario Silva", the National Assembly of Venezuela appointed a committee to investigate webmasters who commit crimes, but denied plans to regulate the internet.

== See also ==
- List of newspapers in Venezuela
