= Diario de los Andes =

Venezuelan Newspaper

- Type: Daily newspaper
- Owner(s): Editorial Diario de Los Andes CA
- Headquarters: Valera, Trujillo
- Website: www.diariodelosandes.com

Diario de los Andes is a Venezuelan regional newspaper, circulated in the Venezuelan Andes states of Trujillo, Táchira and Mérida. The original Trujillo edition was established in the late 1970s, while the Táchira and Mérida editions were established in the 1990s.

== See also ==
- List of newspapers in Venezuela
