= Meridiano Televisión =

Venezuelan television sports channel

- Type: Broadcast television network
- Country: Venezuela
- Headquarters: Caracas

Programming
- Language: Spanish
- Picture format: HDTV 1080i

Ownership
- Owner: Bloque De Armas

History
- Launched: December 5, 1997
- Founder: Dr. Andres De Armas

Availability

Terrestrial
- Analog UHF: Channel 37 (Caracas, listings may vary)
- Digital UHF: Channel 23.3

Meridiano Televisión is a 24-hour sports network in Venezuela.

== History ==
Meridiano Televisión was launched in 1997 as a privately owned television network in Venezuela, exclusively dedicated to national and international sports. It is owned by Bloque De Armas, which also owns the sports newspaper Diario Meridiano.

With many similarities to the sport network ESPN, Meridiano Televisión transmits almost all sporting events, mainly baseball (the Major League of Baseball and the Venezuelan League of Professional Baseball) because it is considered to be the Venezuelan national sport. Also, sporting events that are popular in Venezuela and that are widely seen on Meridiano Televisión are Venezuela First Division games, the Spanish La Liga, the AFF Cup, the AFC Cup and the UEFA Champions League and UEFA Euro 2012 among others.

== Programming ==
The most watched programs on Meridiano Televisión are:

- Noticiero Meridiano (3 broadcasts a day)
- Solo Basket
