= Caprile (disambiguation) =

Caprile is a comune in the Province of Biella in the Italian region Piedmont.

Caprile may also refer to:

- Caprile (surname), an Italian surname
- Villa Caprile, Pesaro, a seventeenth-century Baroque palace in Marche, Italy

== See also ==
- Capri (disambiguation)
- Capriles (disambiguation)
