= Caprile (surname) =

Caprile is an Italian surname. Notable people with the surname include:

- Emilio Caprile (1928–2020), Italian footballer
- Elia Caprile (born 2001), Italian professional footballer
- Walter Caprile (born 1973), former Uruguayan footballer
- Vincenzo Caprile (1856–1936), Italian painter

== See also ==
- Caprile (disambiguation)
- Capriles (surname)
