= Plaza Monumental Román Eduardo Sandia =

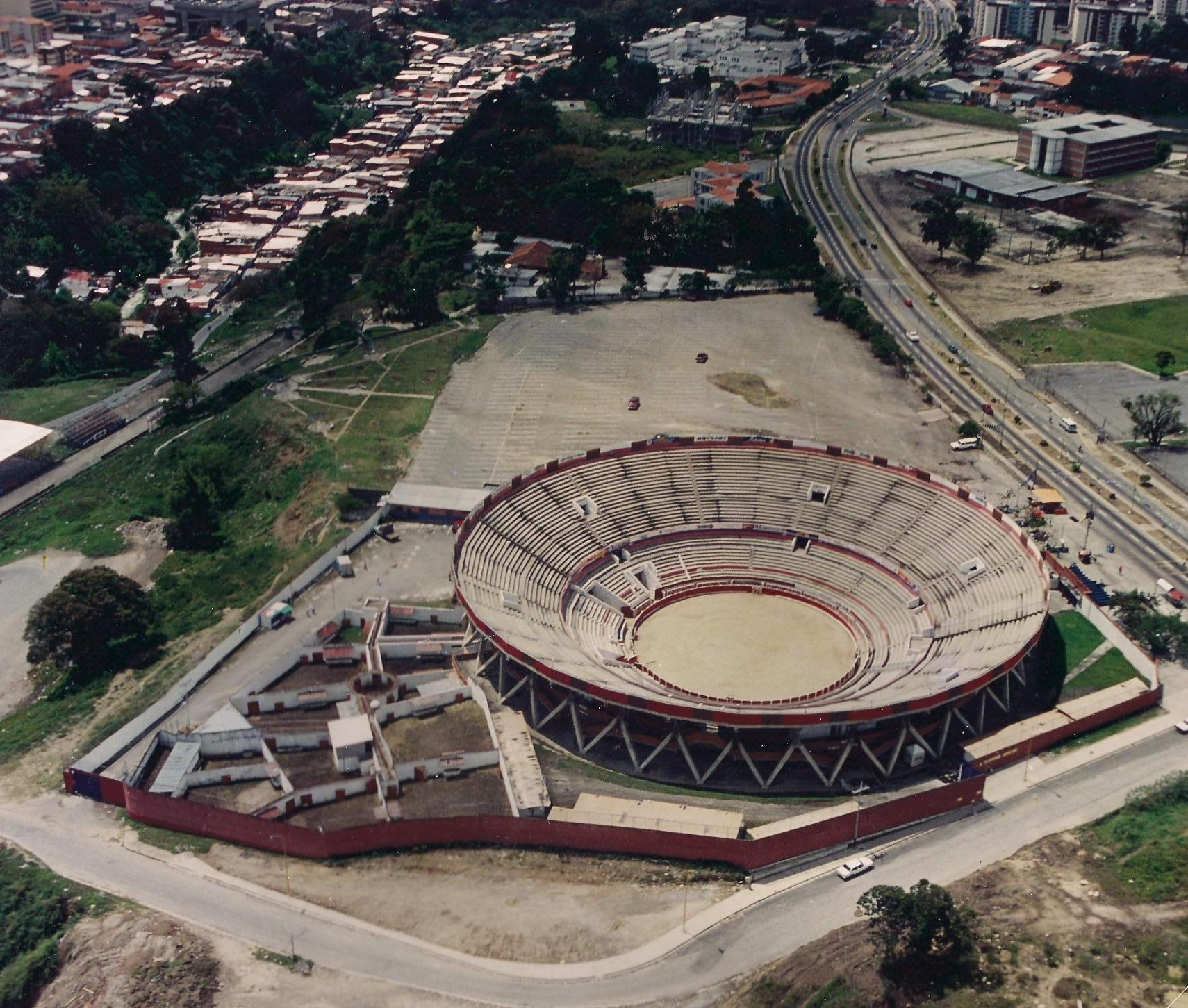
Plaza Monumental Román Eduardo Sandia

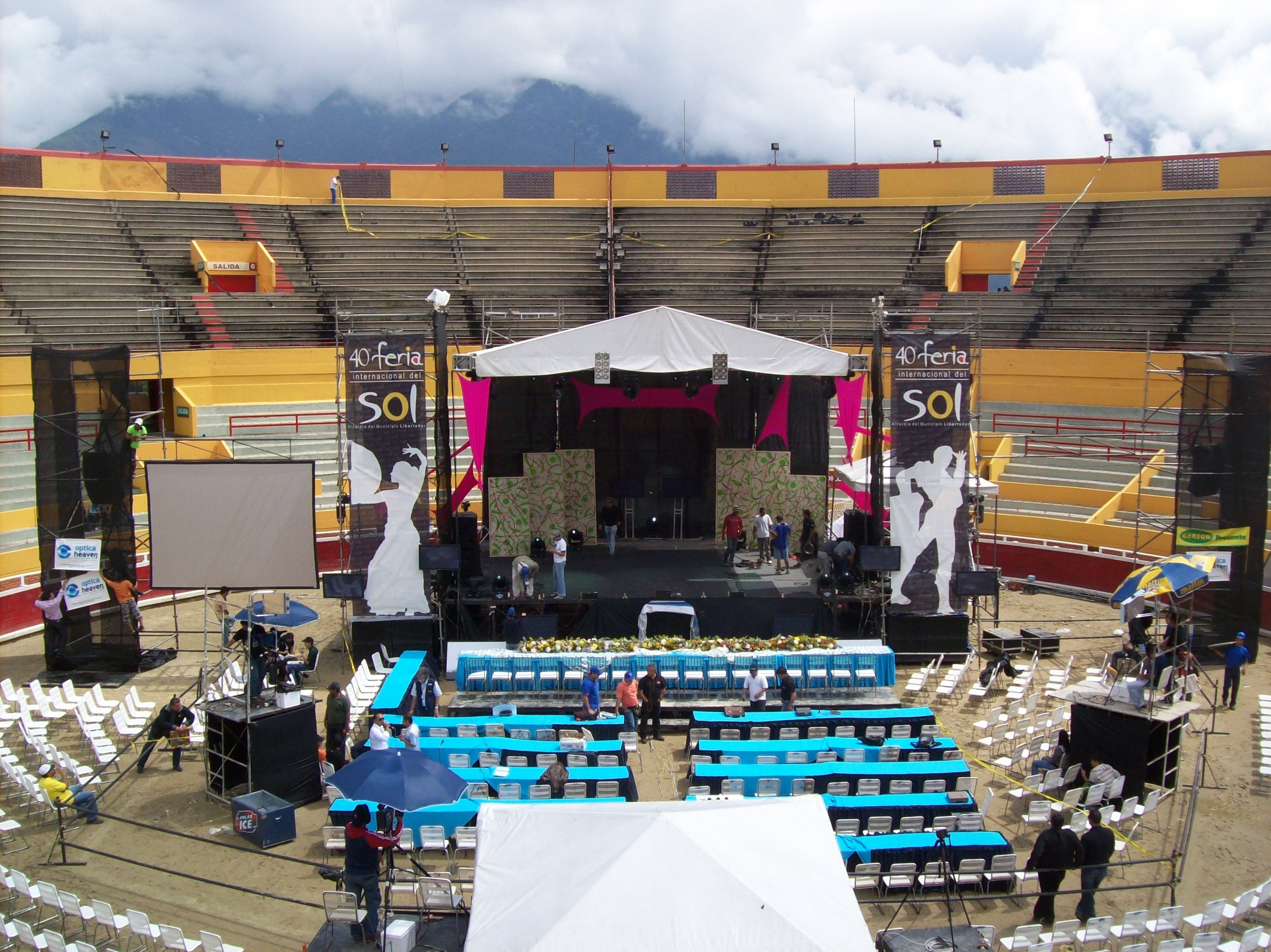
Arena during preparations for the election and crowning of the Reina Internacional del Sol 2009

Plaza Monumental Román Eduardo Sandia, also known as the Plaza de toros de Mérida, is a bullring in the city of Mérida, Venezuela. It is the second largest venue for large scale cultural and artistic events in the city after the Estadio Olímpico Metropolitano and the location for bullfights of the Feria Internacional del Sol.

The plaza was inaugurated in 1967 as a venue for various events of Ferias del Sol, and has a capacity of 16,000 spectators.

It has welcomed leading bullfighters including Julián López Escobar ("El Juli"), Francisco Rivera Ordóñez, Juan José ("Morante de la Puebla"), Miguel Ángel Perera, Enrique Ponce, Francisco Rivera [Paquirrí", Pálomo Lináres, Javier Conde, Manuel Bénitez ("El Cordobés"), José Mari Manzanares, Antonio Barrera, Paquito Perlaza, Leonardo Bénitez, Luis Bolivar, David Fandila "El Fandi", Mary Paz Vega, Morenito de Maracay, Nerio Ramirez ("El Tovareño"), Rafael Orellana, César Vanegas, César Faraco and Eduardo Valenzuela.

It has also hosted Venezuelan and international artists and singers including Juanes, Maná, Desorden Público, Caramelos de Cianuro, Franco De Vita, Paulina Rubio, Chino & Nacho, Don Omar, Tito El Bambino, Molotov, Wisin & Yandel, Dalmata, Menudo, Vos Veis, Los Hombres G, Aterciopelados, Jorge Celedón, Jean Carlos Centeno, L'squadron, Tecupae, Luis Silva and Armando Martínez.

== In popular culture ==
Concert scenes of the 1982 film, Menudo: La Película, were filmed here.
