= El Tiempo (Anzoátegui) =

Venezuelan newspaper in Anzoátegui state

- Type: Daily newspaper
- Publisher: Editores Orientales, C.A
- Founded: 29 August 1958
- Language: Spanish
- Headquarters: Puerto la Cruz
- Website: www.eltiempo.com.ve

El Tiempo is a Venezuelan regional newspaper, headquartered in Puerto la Cruz, in the state of Anzoátegui.

== History ==
The newspaper was launched in 1951 as Voz Caribe, a weekly newspaper. It was relaunched as a daily, under the new name El Tiempo, following the restoration of democracy after the 1958 Venezuelan coup d'état. Under the management of Jesús Márquez (1978–1985) the newspaper increased its circulation from 6300 to 35,000, and its size from 16 pages to 40.

The board of directors of Editores Orientales, C.A includes Adolfo Raul Taylhardat.

On 27 April 2018, it was announced that El Tiempo would become a weekly newspaper again after over 60 years as a daily newspaper, with its first weekly edition (printing every Friday) on 4 May 2018. The move was announced by the editorial board as a result of persistent shortages of paper and other printing supplies.

== See also ==
- List of newspapers in Venezuela
