= Miguel Ángel Capriles =

Venezuelan businessman (1915–1996)

Miguel Ángel Capriles Ayala (Note: In this name that follows Hispanic American naming customs, the first or paternal surname is Capriles and the second or maternal family name is Ayala.) (28 February 1915 – 25 April 1996) was the head of Venezuela's Cadena Capriles media group.

Capriles was born in Puerto Cabello, Carabobo, in 1915. He launched Últimas Noticias in 1941, after the pro-freedom measures implemented by President Isaías Medina Angarita. In 1956 Capriles Ayala acquired the newspaper La Esfera. On 3 February 1958, shortly after the end of the dictatorship of Marcos Pérez Jiménez on 23 January 1958, Capriles launched El Mundo, which for most of its existence was the only Venezuelan evening newspaper. La Esfera which was sold in 1966. In 1959 he bought the magazine Élite. In 1962 he acquired the magazines Venezuela Gráfica and Páginas (the latter of which folded in 1999); in 1966 he founded Diario Crítica in Maracaibo, which closed in 1990; in 1968 he founded the Suplemento Cultural to Últimas Noticias; in 1969 he founded the sports daily Extra (which folded a year later). In 1970 he founded Dominical, the Sunday magazine of Últimas Noticias, and the magazin Hipódromo; in 1972 he bought Kena (folded in 1999) and founded Kabala and Alarma (folded in 1973); in 1974 he founded the Maracaibo newspaper El Vespertino, which folded in 1982. In 1988 he founded Guía Hípica, which folded in 2007. Following the death of Capriles Ayala in 1996 taken over in 1998 by his son, Miguel Ángel Capriles López. La Cadena Capriles founded in 2005 URBE and the sports publication Líder and acquired Urbe Bikini. In 2009, it founded El Mundo Economía y Negocios. Other media enterprises currently owned by La Cadena Capriles include La Cadena Multicolor and PlanetaurbeTV.

Capriles was elected to the Senate in 1968 on COPEI's party list and seven Capriles nominees were elected to the Chamber of Deputies, including the editor of El Mundo, Pedro Ramón Romero. Capriles Ayala's brother, the journalist and historian Carlos Capriles Ayala, was named ambassador to Spain.

== Controversies ==
Shortly before his death, his son, Miguel Ángel "Michu" Capriles López, initiated a legal battle to deny the inheritance that belonged to his half-brother, Miguel Ángel Capriles Cannizaro, and Capriles Ayala's last wife, Magaly Cannizaro. Ultimately, the Supreme Court ruled in favor of Capriles López and his six sisters.

== Books ==
- Memorias de la inconformidad, 1973
- Siempre habrá Venezuela, Editorial Domingo Fuentes, 1985
