= Tyszowce Confederation =

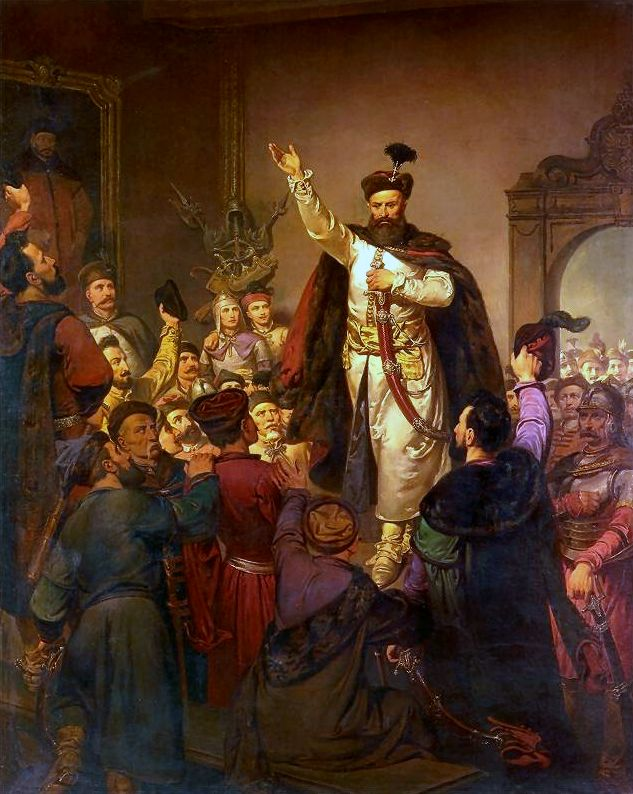
Tyszowce Confederation by Walery Eljasz-Radzikowski

The Tyszowce Confederation (in Polish Konfederacja tyszowiecka) was set up by the Polish army under the command of Great Crown Hetman Stanisław Rewera Potocki and Field Crown Hetman Stanisław Lanckoroński 29 December 1655 in Tyszowce, east of Zamość. It was the turning point of the war of Poland with Sweden during The Deluge. The Polish Catholic army was offended by the Swedish siege of Jasna Góra monastery and proclaimed a national uprising against the Swedish.
