= La Verdad (Venezuela) =

- Type: Daily newspaper
- Founded: 1998
- Language: Spanish
- Headquarters: Maracaibo, Venezuela
- Website: www.laverdad.com

Diario La Verdad is a Venezuelan regional newspaper, headquartered in Maracaibo, in the western state of Zulia. Its slogan is "Por la libertad intelectual del Zulia" (for the intellectual freedom of Zulia).

La Verdad was founded in 1998. It is owned by Sinergia Editorial C.A.

== La Verdad Foundation ==
On 28 December 2010, La Verdad created the La Verdad Foundation to improve the quality of life in Zulia. The foundation offers partnerships, training programs and other services to help the Zulia community.

== See also ==
- List of newspapers in Venezuela
