= Diario Panorama =

Venezuelan newspaper

Panorama
- Type: Daily newspaper
- Founded: 1 December 1914
- Headquarters: Maracaibo; Venezuela
- Circulation: 101,000 (Mon-Sat); 123,000 (Sun)
- Website: N/A

Panorama (Diario Panorama) was a Venezuelan newspaper based in Maracaibo in the state of Zulia. It was established on 1 December 1914.

== See also ==
- List of newspapers in Venezuela
