= El Siglo (Venezuela) =

Daily newspaper in Maracay, Aragua, Venezuela

- Type: Daily newspaper
- Founded: 1974
- Headquarters: Maracay; Venezuela
- Website: www.elsiglo.com.ve

El Siglo is a regional daily newspaper that is published in Maracay, Aragua, Venezuela. It was founded on March 25, 1974. It circulates in Aragua, Carabobo, Guárico and Miranda states, as well as a small circulation in Caracas. Its current head is Tulio Capriles Hernández.

== History ==
El Siglo is a morning daily with a daily circulation of 85,000 and a Sunday circulation of 95,000. In 2004, El Siglo's president denounced Didalco Bolívar, the governor of Aragua, in front of the Sociedad Interamericana de Prensa for his having searched El Siglo's premises, and the governor in turn sued the paper for defamation. In January 2007, the paper's circulation was interrupted for three days because of a conflict over organized labor.

== See also ==
- List of newspapers in Venezuela
