= Robert Hanson (financier) =

British financier

The Honourable Robert Hanson
- Born: 3 October 1960 (age 64)
- Education: Eton College
- Alma mater: St Peter's College, Oxford
- Occupations: Financier; Company chairman
- Spouse: Masha Markova
- Children: 1
- Parent(s): Lord Hanson; Geraldine Kaelin

The Hon. Robert William Hanson (born 3 October 1960) is a British financier and business man. He is chairman of Hanson Family Holdings, a private company which owns businesses in the fields of logistics, investment banking, news media, and chemicals.

== Early life ==
Hanson is the elder son of James Hanson, by his marriage in 1959 to Geraldine Kaelin, an American. He had a younger brother, Brook Hanson (1964–2014).

Educated at Eton and St Peter's College, Oxford, Hanson's first job was as an assistant keeper of reptiles at the Windsor Safari Park.

== Career ==
In the 1980s, Hanson joined N M Rothschild & Sons, then went to work for his father, who was created a life peer in 1983.

At the end of 1997 Hanson resigned from his father's public company, when it was broken up, to become chairman of Hanson Transport Group. In 1998 he founded Hanson Capital, a group of financial services companies aiming to capitalise on his worldwide network of relationships with major investors. This continues as part of the present group of companies.

Hanson is now the chairman of Hanson Family Holdings, a private company which owns a wide range of businesses in logistics, investment banking and chemicals around the world.

In 2013, Hanson used Hanson Family Holdings to buy Venezuela's best-selling newspaper, Últimas Noticias, for a figure reported as $US98 million. In 2014, he was accused by newspaper staff of turning it into "a Socialist Party mouthpiece", but the editor, Héctor Dávila, replied that his only instructions from Hanson were "to run a balanced and profitable newspaper".

== Personal life ==
Once linked with Sophie Anderton, Tara Palmer-Tomkinson, and a string of models, Hanson's name appeared in many gossip columns.

He eventually married the Russian model Masha Markova, at the time half his age, and moved to Los Angeles. The engagement was reported in March 2010 as coming as a shock to London society, and their son Max was born in October.
