= Gerardo Reyes (journalist) =

Colombian investigative journalist (born 1958)

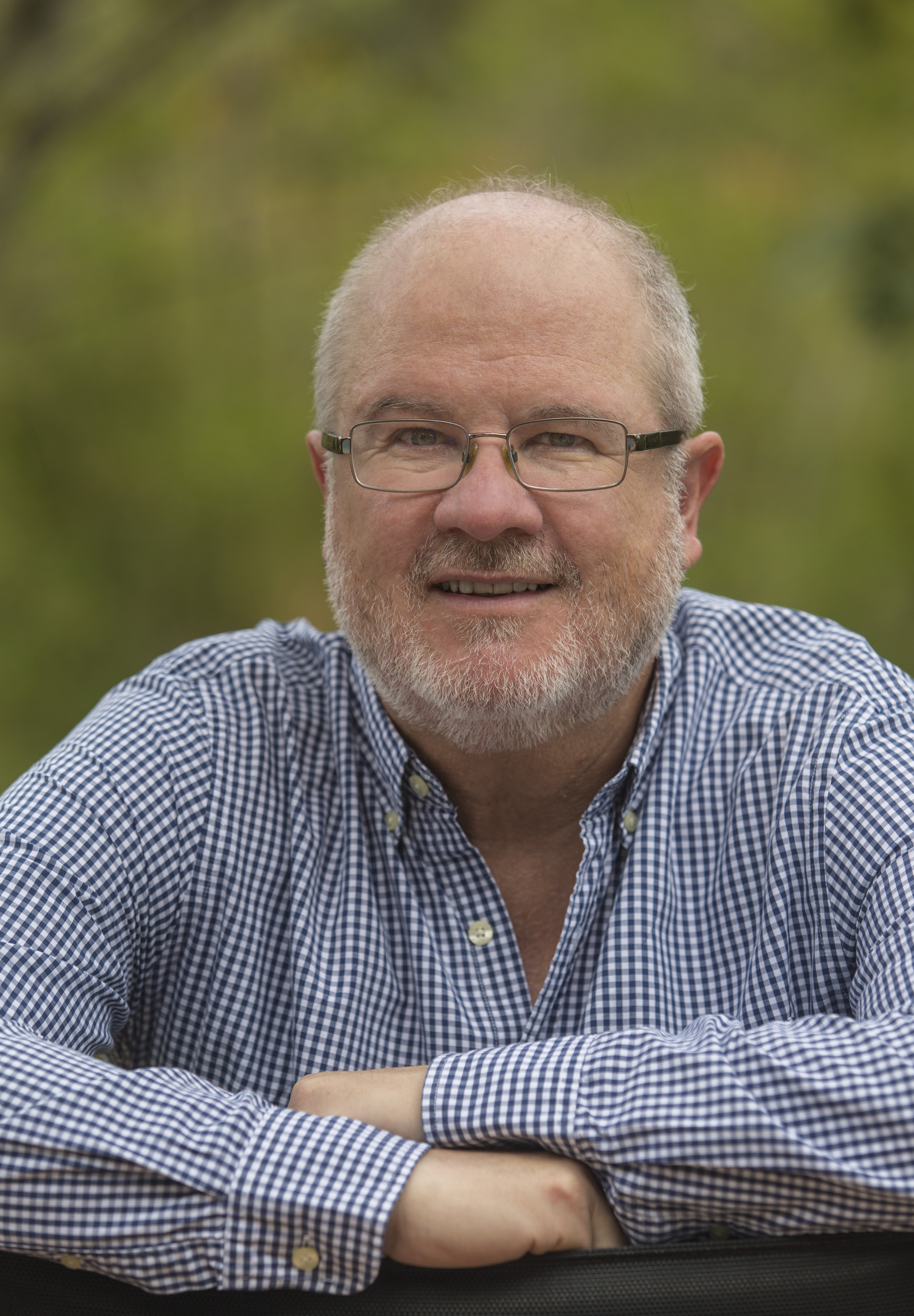
- Gerardo Reyes
- Born: Gerardo Reyes Copello; 1958 (age 67–68); Cúcuta, Colombia
- Occupation: Investigative journalist
- Years active: 1972–present

Gerardo Reyes Copello (born 1958, Cúcuta, Colombia) is an investigative journalist. He works as director of the investigative unit of Univision Network. He worked at El Nuevo Herald in Miami, Florida. In The Miami Herald, he won a shared Pulitzer Prize in 1999.

== Career ==
Education

Reyes studied law in Bogotá.

Trajectory

Gerardo Reyes Copello, born 1958 is a Colombian investigative journalist who leads the investigative team of Univision Network. For more than 30 years, Reyes has devoted himself to investigate corruption schemes in Latin America and the ramifications in the United States of those schemes.

Besides exposing nexus between politicians and drug trafficking, he has dedicated several of his reports to the study of Latin American magnates and the concentration of the wealth in the region.

His individual and collective works have been recognized with the most prestigious journalism awards in Spanish and English, such as the Pulitzer Prize, Maria Moors Cabot, Peabody Award, three Emmy Awards, IRE for investigations and Ortega y Gasset and Planeta.

"Its subject matter is power in all its expressions: politicians, businessmen, officials and police. But also mafia bosses, murderers and corrupt bureaucrats. Reyes unusually combines investigative rigor with good pen '', wrote Lorenzo Morales in the book "Facts for Telling".

He has been dedicated to investigative Journalism since 1978.

In Bogota, Colombia, he was a member of the revolutionary investigative unit of the newspaper El Tiempo, one of the first teams of this type in the hemisphere.

After moving to The Miami Herald and El Nuevo Herald, he published a series of reports highlighting issues ranging from medical malpractice and electoral fraud to drugs and arms trafficking.

He wrote the first systematic guide in Spanish of investigative journalism methods.

He is co-founder of Journalists and Research Editors, an organization through which he has promoted transnational collaboration among his colleagues.

The Beginnings

Gerardo Reyes Copello graduated from Law School at the Santo Tomas de Aquino University in Bogota. His first incursions into journalism began in 1978, as an investigator of Propúblicos, a Bogota foundation that supervised the work of congressmen in matters of bills, assistance and debates.

The results of this review were published by the prominent journalist Daniel Samper Pizano in the newspaper El Tiempo, and then compiled in two guides for voters.

By that time, Samper founded the investigative unit of El Tiempo, along with Alberto Donadio, an expert lawyer of information access rights.

Both journalists invited Reyes to work on the team that, for over a decade, uncovered numerous official and financial corruption scandals and was emulated by other newspapers in Colombia and Latin America. As part of this team, Reyes published a series that documented bribes paid by the multinational Ericcson to several telecommunications officials in Colombia, Venezuela, Peru and Bolivia. The series was recognized with the National Grand Prize of Journalism in 1987.

In 1988 he was hired by the newspaper El Nuevo Herald in Miami, where he worked as sub-editor for the local section and correspondent for Latin America. There he combined his investigative work with chronicles from both Miami and the countries he visited.

In the 1990s, he reported on Colombia's tumultuous presidential elections in the midst of the cartel war against the government. He brought new elements to the scandal of drug money infiltration in President Ernesto Samper's campaign. His work with reporter Evelyn Larubia on the death causes of a Colombian singer, during cosmetic surgery in Miami, led to the arrest of the physician who practiced it.

The series received the Hispanic Journalists Association award in 1993 at the Press category. In September 1994, Reyes and his colleague Jeff Leen of The Miami Herald reported that several DEA agents in Colombia had sold Medellin Cartel drug traffickers their diplomatic rights to import cars into that country.

During these years, Reyes wrote chronicles that were selected for anthologies of Colombian journalism. One of them is the story of a Colombian maid who maintained a torrid affair with the great Italian mafia boss in New York Paul Castellano.

He also published the adventures of a Medellin drug trafficker, who left the drug business to become a trappist monk, who was flocking to find a healing miracle. He also wrote a chronicle about an attractive woman who laundered dollars for the cartels. This last one was taken to the television in the series "The Butterfly".

In 1992, he covered the trial of Panamanian General Manuel Antonio Noriega in Miami for El Nuevo Herald and El Tiempo. He also followed the maneuvers of a General of the National Guard of Venezuela to introduce to the United States a ton of cocaine, with the knowledge of the Central Intelligence Agency (CIA). This theme was taken by the show 60 Minutos of CBS. Reyes collaborated with the segment producer, the legendary journalist Lowell Bergman.

In 1997, Reyes discovered a secret account of $6 million linked to Nicaraguan Sandinista General Humberto Ortega, brother of the two-time president of that country Daniel Ortega. He also brought to light a plan to kill Cuban President Fidel Castro financed by the powerful Cuban-American Foundation. That same year, he published a report about a group of bankers that, after break in Ecuador, leaving homeless thousands of savers, lived a king's life in Miami. In mid-1997 he covered for El Nuevo Herald and The Miami Herald the trial of several operators of a cell for the Cali cartel in South Florida.

In 1998 he participated in The Miami Herald's team which received the Pulitzer Prize for the best investigation. The series denounced various forms of corruption in the city's Mayor elections. The Reyes' article of the series found that among the voters there were several people convicted for federal crimes, which should have prevented them from voting.

Investigative Correspondent

In 2000, having published a manual on investigative journalism, Reyes developed an extensive network of contacts with investigative reporters in Latin America. In one of his trips to Venezuela, with the cooperation of the journalist Luz Mely Reyes, he brought to light the first corruption scandal of the government of President Hugo Chávez: the award of a printing contract of the new Bolivarian constitution to mandatary's collaborators and friends.

He worked with Argentine reporters on the ramifications in the United States of the business of President Carlos Menem and his family; with Peruvians journalists, he revealed the connections of presidential adviser Vladimiro Montesinos. He also worked with Venezuelans reporters in the coverage of a case about a Venezuelan businessman, resident in Miami, that was discovered with a briefcase full of dollars for the campaign of the Argentine president Cristina Kirchner.

In 2003, he covered for El Nuevo Herald and the magazine Semana de Colombia, the trial in Miami against the head of the Medellin cartel, Fabio Ochoa. For his journalistic career and his efforts to integrate Latin American investigative colleagues, Reyes received the Columbia University's Maria Moors Cabot Award in 2004.

In January 2005, under the title "Slaves in Paradise," he started a series that exposed the subhuman conditions of Haitian workers in sugar mills in the Dominican Republic.

Based on judicial records and interviews, he published an article in December 2007 that showed the ties of the father of then-Colombian president Alvaro Uribe Velez with a helicopter seized in 1984 in the raid on Tranquilandia, the largest cocaine processing laboratory in the history of the war against drug trafficking in Colombia.

The report revealed unpublished judicial statements of the sister of the murdered Minister of Justice, Rodrigo Lara Bonilla, in which he remembered that his brother suspected that Uribe was implicated in drug trafficking. A year before, Reyes had published court documents proving an unknown fact: that Uribe Velez had been accused of the crimes of falsification and contraband in connection with the importation of a Turbocomander aircraft in 1983.

Together with Gonzalo Guillén, a correspondent for El Nuevo Herald in Bogota, Reyes published other reports that shed light on Uribe Velez's relationship with paramilitarism. One of these reports revealed the testimony of former Colombian paramilitary Francisco Enrique Villaba Hernández, about Uribe and his brother Santiago's involvement in planning a massacre at Aro municipality, Antioquia department, in 1997.

One year after the article was published, Villalba was killed. From the work of the two journalists wrote Adam Isacson of the Center for International Policy in Washington: "El Nuevo Herald has carried out the most daring investigative journalism reporting on the power of traffickers and paramilitaries in Colombia ... much of this is the work of two veteran reporters from El Nuevo Herald, Gerardo Reyes and Gonzalo Guillén".

Reyes and Guillen collected key testimonies that compromised Colombian military personnel in the forced disappearances of innocent civilians known as "false positives"; they also denounced the US government's cover-up of a military man and a US Army contractor involved in the rape of a minor in Colombia, and the FARC's links with drug trafficking.

Reyes revealed in 2009 that then-Defense Minister and later president of Colombia Juan Manuel Santos directly intervened to prevent annulation of a contract of his best friend Felipe Jaramillo's company, although army officers recommended another company.

A year later he found that a son of President Uribe had acted as an intermediary between a Colombian company of the Nule brothers, who were involved in a major bribery scandal, and the Brazilian construction company Odebrecht, to participate in one of the mega-works of his father's government in Colombia.

Reyes was a correspondent and advisor for Semana magazine until 2007. He also advised magazine Gatopardo and collaborated with the magazine Poder. For more than 10 years, he was a jury of the Prize of the Institute of Press (IPYS) and Society for the Best Investigation in Latin America. He is a member of the International Consortium of Investigative Journalists (ICIJ). He has been a lecturer and professor at several universities in the United States, Latin America and Spain.

== Work at Univision ==
In 2011 Univision Network, under a new administration by Isaac Lee (CEO News, Entertainment and Digital) and Daniel Coronell (News President) commissioned Reyes to create an investigative unit. The team was initially formed by producer Margarita Rabin and Spanish reporter and producer Tomas Ocaña.

In its first year, Univision Investiga produced the special "The Iranian Threat", which shows how a group of Mexican students was recruited by the governments of Iran and Venezuela to prepare a cyber attack on the United States. The students did not accept the mission but decided to tape the diplomats involved, including the Iranian ambassador and the cultural attaché of Venezuela who was later appointed consul in Miami. Following the revelation of the plan in the Univision special, the US State Department expelled the consul. Chavez ordered the closure of the consulate.

In the middle of the year, Univision Investiga released an unknown episode in life of Florida Republican senator Marco Rubio, presidential candidate for the 2016 elections. Reyes found documents showing that in 1987 the US government confiscated the house in Miami of Barbara Rubio, the politician's sister and her husband Orlando Cicilia, as part of a large-scale anti-drug operation against an organization that imported and distributed cocaine and marijuana in South Florida.

Cicilia was sentenced to 25 years in prison but was released in 2000 by reduction of sentence. The senator, who was 16 when the events occurred, refused to talk to reporters seeking an explanation of how that episode influenced his political career and whether his family had benefited from the money of Cicilia. A spokesperson for Rubio called the quest for reaction as something outrageous to sensational journalism.

Four years later, The Washington Post, based in part on the documents obtained by Univision, resumed the story and expanded it adding that Cilicia's role in drug trafficking had been more important than it had been initially reported. Details of the controversy that arose between Univision, Rubio, the Republican Party, and the Miami Herald following the report were the focus of an analysis by the media critic of The New Yorker magazine and the Columbia Journalism Review.

Univision Investiga aired in 2012 "Fast and Furious. Arming the Enemy" special, which revealed how the weapons of a covert operation of the US federal government ended up being used in massacres of innocent people in Mexico, committed by drug traffickers.

The special was recognized with the Peabody Award, one of the most prestigious awards on television in the United States. It was also honored by the National Association of Investigative Journalists of the United States (IRE).

The team received the Emmy Award for Best Investigation in 2013 for the special "El Chapo Guzman, the Eternal Fugitive", the life and adventures of drug trafficker Joaquin El Chapo Guzmán. The documental beat rating records in the history of Univision. In 2015 Reyes and the Univision team were recognized with the Ortega y Gasset Award, one of the most prestigious prizes in the Spanish-speaking world, for an extensive chronicle on how drug trafficking has been taken on the illegal mining business in Latin America. The chronicle was published in Univision.com. The television version received an Emmy in the same year.

== Books ==
In addition to the selection of chronicles compiled by Planeta in the book Made in Miami and the Manual of Investigative journalism, Reyes has published the following works:

Academic text

- Investigative Journalism, Trillas, Mexico, 1996

Investigation journalism

- Made in Miami. Lives of narcos, saints, seducers, caudillos and snitches (Made in Miami. Vidas de narcos, santos, seductores, caudillos y soplones). Planeta, Bogotá, 1999, 200 pages, ISBN 9586147916.
- Don Julio Mario: unauthorized biography of Colombia's most powerful man, Ediciones B, Bogotá (Don Julio Mario: biografía no autorizada del hombre más poderoso de Colombia, Ediciones B, Bogotá), 2003. 372 pages (2nd ed. Grijalbo, 2011)
- Our Man in the DEA: the story of a photographer who negotiated the liberty of more than a centenarian of narcos in the United States (Nuestro hombre en la DEA: la historia de un fotógrafo que negoció la libertad de más de un centenear de narcos en Estados Unidos), Planeta, 2007, 360 pages, ISBN 9789584217707.
- Flight 495: the ignored tragedy of the first air abduction in the United States (Vuelo 495: la tragedia ignorada del primer secuestro aéreo en Estados Unidos), Random House, 2015, ISBN 9588870348.
- Frechette Confesses (Frechette se confiesa), Planeta, Bogotá, 2015, 264 pages, ISBN 9789584247476.

As editor

- The Owners of Latin America. How the richest and most influential personages of the region amassed their fortunes (Los dueños de América Latina. Cómo amasaron sus fortunas los personajes más ricos e influyentes de la región), Editions B, 2005, 330 pages, ISBN 9707100745 (10) ISBN 978-9707100749 (13). Reyes, G. Los Duenos De America Latina / The Owners of Latin America. 2003. ISBN 9707100745. ISBN 978-9707100749

Description of some of his books

- In The Owners of Latin America, the entrepreneurs presented in this book are the richest and most influential people in Latin America. They were chosen taking into account the list of the world's richest Forbes magazine and the degree of political influence in each country. The presence of some of them in the scale of Forbes is intermittent, but the absence between one year and another does not seem to diminish its power.
- Our Man at the DEA tells the story of a photographer who negotiated the freedom of more than a hundred of drug traffickers in the United States. The investigation took Reyes six years, more than 60 interviews, attending the trial of Fabio Ochoa Vásquez in Miami and unraveling almost a 150 hours of dialogues.

A year later, the result was a real "novel", full of humor, which in 54 chapters tells the life of Baruch Vega, the photographer of the most beautiful women of the '80s and '90s, in the continent. The book is being developed in Miami, Yugoslavia, Saudi Arabia, Panama, and Colombia.

Reyes also wrote a book about Colombian businessman Alex Saab, with the Editorial Planeta, based on 120 interviews. Reyes described Saab as a "super minister", saying that he had more tasks than any other member of Nicolás Maduro's cabinet, and has written that the United States calculates that Saab's profits from the Venezuelan government were over a billion dollars.

== Awards ==
- Pulitzer 1999 to the series Dirty Votes, The Race for Miami Mayor, which exposed the irregularities of the city's electoral contest in 1998, such as buying votes and falsifying votes Of deceased persons and of criminals - he was part of the Miami Herald team that received the 1999 Pulitzer Prize for investigative reporting.
- Maria Moors Cabot, Columbia University, 2004, by Don Julio Mario.
- Planeta Journalism Award 2007 for Our Man at the DEA.
- Peabody 2012 by Fast and Furious: Arming the Enemy, The Peabody Awards
- IRE Awards 2012 by Fast and Furious: Arming the Enemy, IRE Awards
- Emmy 2012 by El Chapo Guzman: The Eternal Fugitive, Univision Investiga
- Ortega y Gasset 2015, digital journalism for the piece The New Narco Treasures, Univision Investiga.
- Emmy 2015 by The New Narco Treasures
