= Bloque De Armas =

Bloque Dearmas
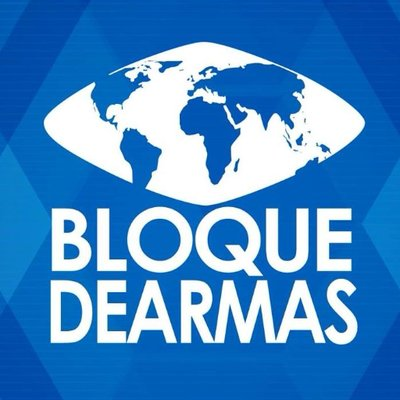
- Industry: Mass media
- Founded: 8 January 1969; 57 years ago
- Founder: Armando de Armas
- Headquarters: Caracas, Venezuela
- Area served: Venezuela
- Key people: Andrés De Armas Silva (CEO)
- Products: Publishing, broadcasting, cable TV, Internet
- Owner: Dearmas family
- Parent: Televisa (since 1993 until 2019)
- Website: bloquedearmas.com

Bloque De Armas is a Venezuelan media company. Among other properties it owns the newspapers Diario 2001 and Diario Meridiano and the sports network Meridiano Televisión.

== History ==
The company was created in 1969 as a holding company for the various businesses of Armando De Armas. De Armas had launched Distribuidora Continental in 1947, followed by other businesses (including Editorial América, launched in 1960). 1969 also saw the launch of sports newspaper Diario Meridiano, while Diario 2001 was launched in 1973.

In 1965 De Armas expanded into the United States, building a large collection of magazine titles, with Spanish-language versions of Hearst Corporation titles, and acquiring Cuban fashion magazine Vanidades in 1967 and Colombian publishing company Editorial América Colombia in 1970. De Armas sold Hispanic Magazine Network, U.S.A. to Grupo Anaya in 1989.

In 1993, the Bloque Dearmas formed an alliance with the Mexican media company Televisa to print and publish its magazines through Editorial Televisa Venezuela.

In 1994 the Bloque Dearmas decided to sell its Colombian subsidiary Editorial América Dearmas Colombia to the Mexican media company Televisa, which renamed it Editorial Televisa Colombia.

== Meridiano de Oro Award ==
The Meridiano de Oro award - also called the «Venezuelan Oscar» - was an award granted by the Bloque De Armas in recognition of the excellence of the professionals in the Entertainment, including journalists, announcers, actors, theater groups and television channels; it was widely considered the highest honor of its style in the country.

== See also ==
- List of newspapers in Venezuela
