= Colette Capriles =

Venezuelan political scientist

- Education: Central University of Venezuela; Simón Bolívar University
- Scientific career
- Fields: Political science; Political philosophy
- Workplaces: Simón Bolívar University

Colette Capriles is a Venezuelan political scientist. As a professor of political philosophy and social sciences at Simón Bolívar University, she served as Head of the Political Science Section. She specializes in the study of anti-liberal political thought and culture, and in Venezuelan politics. Capriles is a frequent media commentator and opinion columnist on these topics.

== Life and career ==
Capriles attended the Central University of Venezuela, where she graduated in 1982 with a degree in social psychology. In 2000, she obtained a master's degree in philosophy from Simón Bolívar University, followed by a doctorate there. Capriles then joined the faculty at Simón Bolívar University, where she became the Head of the Political Science Section.

Capriles's research focuses on the political philosophy of tyranny, anti-liberal political thought, and the political culture of Venezuela during the 1960s.

In 2004, Capriles published La revolución como espectáculo (The revolution as a spectacle). In La revolución como espectáculo, Capriles situates the Chávez government in the context of longstanding political challenges in Venezuela, using pieces of her own journalism, correspondence, and reflections written at the time of political events during the first five years of the Chávez administration. Capriles de-emphasizes the importance of Chávez the individual, whom she describes as omnipresent in contemporary Venezuelan politics and political commentary, and instead contextualizes the Chávez administration as one populist regime in a long history of populist regimes in Venezuelan (and across Latin American) political history.

In 2011, Capriles published the book La máquina de impedir: Crónicas políticas (2004-2010). The book is a chronicle of political events in Venezuela from 2004 to 2010, in particular the progress of the Bolivarian Revolution and the effects on democratic institutions of events in that period.

Capriles is a frequent commentator on political affairs in Venezuela. She has been a longtime regular contributor of opinion pieces about politics and society to the newspaper El Nacional, and was a columnist for the newspaper Tal Cual. She has also been frequently interviewed in the popular media regarding Venezuelan political events, and has commented on contemporary political affairs in Venezuela for international audiences.

Capriles has also been involved in public service in her capacity as an expert in Venezuelan politics. She was one of the civil society members on the commission of advisors to the political opposition as they held meetings with government representatives in the Dominican Republic in 2017.

== Awards and honours ==
Capriles received the 2001 Federico Riu prize for philosophical research for her work La riqueza de las pasiones: la filosofía moral de Adam Smith (The wealth of passions: The moral philosophy of Adam Smith).
