= Nuevo Mundo Israelita =

Jewish newspaper in Caracas, Venezuela

- Type: Weekly
- Format: Tabloid
- Founder: Moisés Sananes
- Publisher: AC Publicaciones Judaicas
- Editor-in-chief: Sami Rozenbaum
- Founded: 1943
- Language: Spanish, Judaeo-Spanish
- Headquarters: Caracas, Venezuela
- ISSN: 1316-2578
- Website: www.nmidigital.com

Nuevo Mundo Israelita (NMI) is a Jewish newspaper published weekly in Caracas, Venezuela. Founded in 1943 by Moisés Sananes with the name "El Mundo Israelita". In 1973, the main Venezuelan Jewish institutions decided to merge it with the monthly "Unión" and the magazines "Maguén" and "Menorá" to create a new institutional and official weekly, "Nuevo Mundo Israelita". It is distributed freely to the Venezuelan Jewish community, and also to journalists and intellectuals in Venezuelan society. It publishes articles written by its own journalists and collaborators, opinion notes, community news, and articles of religious interest. Also employs or translates into Spanish articles originally published in other international Jewish media including Aurora, Haaretz, The Jerusalem Post, The Times of Israel, Israel Hayom, Iton Gadol, Tribuna Judía, Yediot Aharonot, etc.

In March 2016, its webpage, launched in 2003, was thoroughly modernized. Since 2009, Nuevo Mundo Israelita has a Twitter account (@mundoisraelita).

The editors of Nuevo Mundo Israelita have been: Alberto Bierman (1973–76), Pablo Goldstein (1976–81 and 1984–86), Priscilla Abecasis (1981–84), Judith Crosignani (1984), Isaac Nahón Serfaty (1986–87 and 1988–89), Oro Jalfón (1987–88), Néstor Luis Garrido (1989–90), Estrellita Chocrón (1991–96), Francís Rosales (1996–99), Gustavo Arnstein (2000–08), Jacqueline Goldberg (2008–11) and Sami Rozenbaum (2011–present),

NMI includes sometimes a section in Judaeo-Spanish language with articles from Sefaradimuestro, Şalom, Aki Yerushalayim and El Amaneser.

== See also ==
- List of newspapers in Venezuela
