= Feria del Sol (Mérida) =

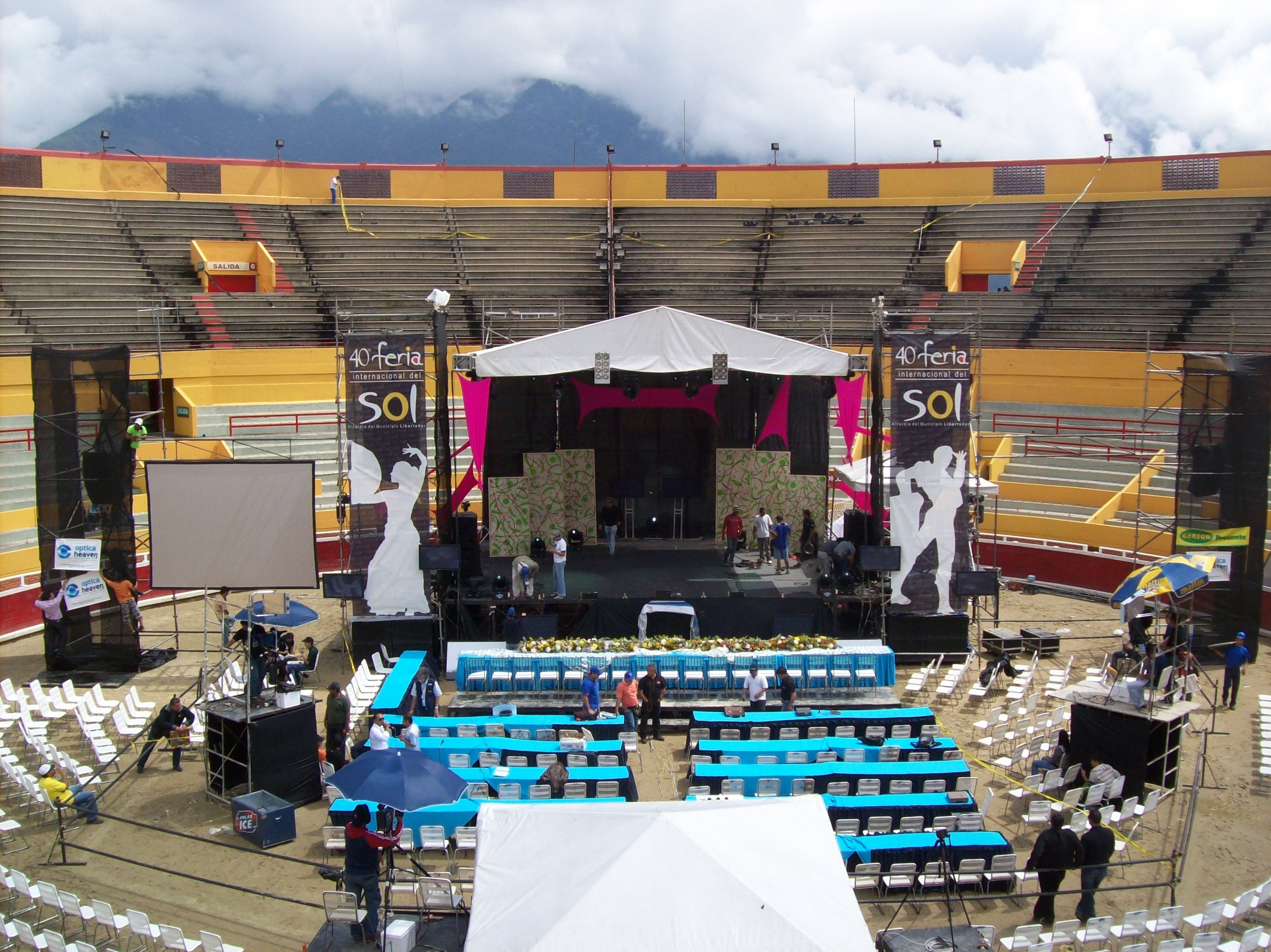
The Circo Monumental of Mérida, center of the contest Queen of the Sun (Reina del Sol)

Feria del Sol (English: Fair of The Sun), or Carnaval Taurino de América (English: Bullfighting carnival of America), is an international cultural festival held in the city of Mérida, Venezuela every year in February. The Feria festival is held alongside the carnival feast. The festival includes bull competitions, cultural expositions, commercial and zootechnic expositions, concerts, parades, sports, and a voting competition for La Reina Del Sol (English: The Queen of The Sun).

== History ==
The city of Mérida or City of the Knights had celebrated its historic past in Venezuela, but it did not have fairs similar to the cities of San Cristóbal, Barquisimeto, Maracaibo, or Táriba. Therefore, a group of amateurs got the idea to build a Plaza de Toros (bullring), so that Mérida had a taurine calendar and a fair counted among the most important of the country. The fair was set for 9 and 10 December, as the feast of Immaculate Conception coincided with the beginning of the month. For the bullfighting, César Faraco, Manuel Benítez "El Cordobés", Francisco Rivera "Paquirri", Julio Aparicio, Curro Girón, Paco Camino and the mounted bullfighter, Juan Cañedo, who is of Mexican origin, fought the bulls of Félix Rodríguez, "Achury Vejo" and "Ambaló", who all originated in Colombia.

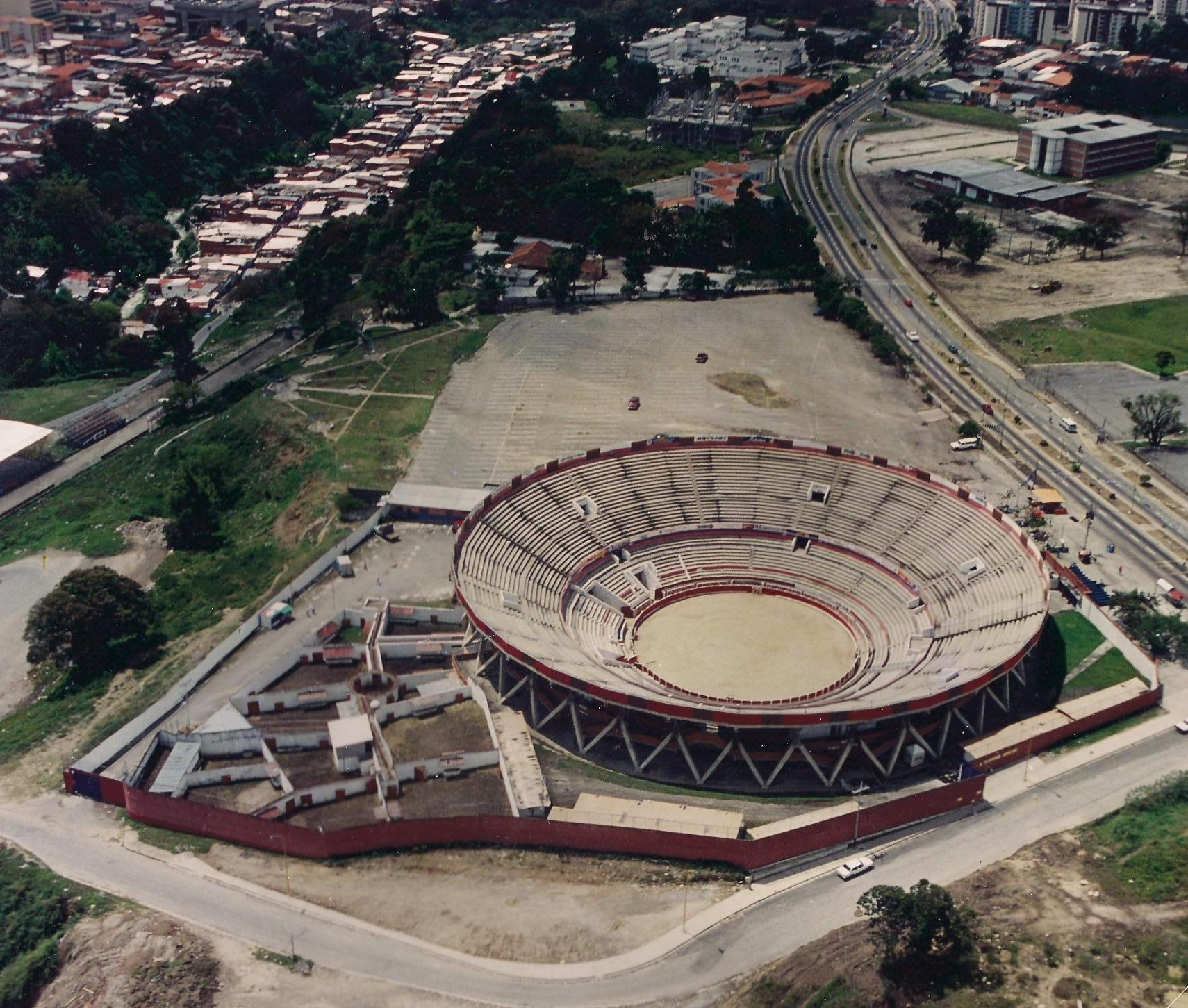
Panorama of Plaza de Toros Román Eduardo Sandia, Mérida

Heavy rainfall impeded the first run, resulting in two runs being held on the second day: one in the morning hours and the other during the afternoon; it was the first time this had happened in the same arena in Venezuela. Previously in Caracas there had been two runs on the same day, but in two different arenas, the "Circo Metropolitano" and the "Nuevo Circo".

In December 1968, the fair wasn't celebrated, though bullfighting did occur on 13 April 1968 on the occasion of Holy Saturday. A stupendous closing was fought by "Dosgutiérrez", Alfredo Leal, Curro Girón and Pepe Cáceres. Then it was decided to celebrate these fairs so that they coincided with the carnivals already known as Feria del Sol; thus in 1969 the first bullfighting carnival took place with three run of bulls, on 15–17 February. The first poster consisted of bulls of "Valparaíso" for Alfredo Leal, Daniel "Matatoba" Santiago, Manuel Benítez "El Cordobés" and the Venezuelan Lucio Requena. The first ear of the fair was for Alfredo Leal.

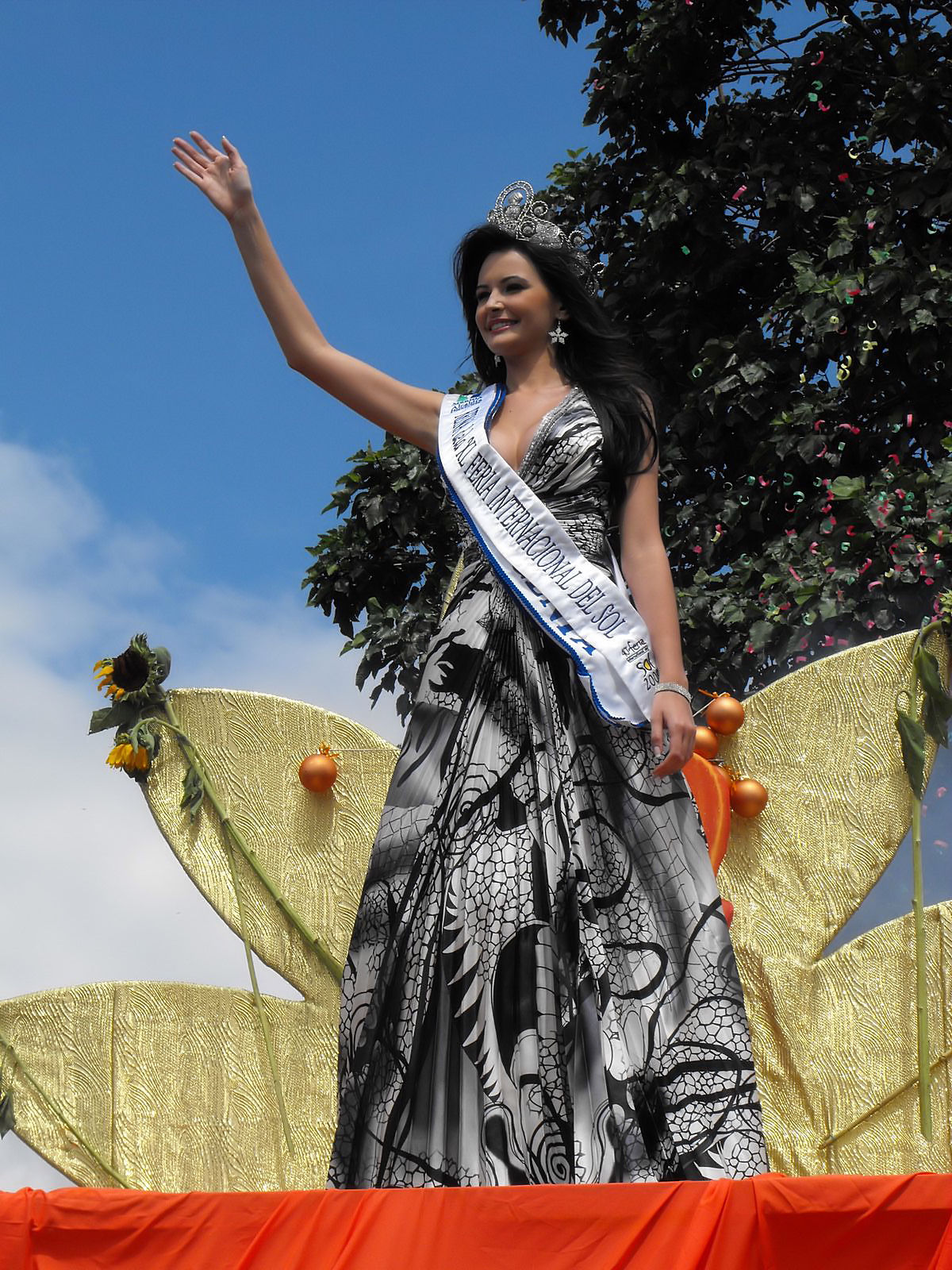
The Reina or Novia del Sol (Queen of the Sun) 2009

Since then, the fair has developed into one of the most important fairs of Venezuela, as well as the taurine world. The fair of the "Immaculate" was celebrated in 1990, 1991, and 1997, but with very little acceptance.

== Bibliography ==
- Guide EDT/Lonely Planet, Venezuela, EDT srl, 2007, ISBN 88-6040-157-7 (in Italian)
- Susan Brushaber, Arnold Greenberg, Venezuela Alive, (Alive Guides Series, Hunter Travel Guides), Hunter Publishing, Inc, 1998 ISBN 1-55650-800-X
