= El Impulso (Venezuela) =

- Logo of El Impulso
- Type: Daily newspaper
- Publisher: C.A EL IMPULSO
- Founded: 1904
- Language: Spanish
- Ceased publication: 15 September 2014
- Headquarters: Barquisimeto, Venezuela
- Website: www.elimpulso.com

El Impulso is the oldest newspaper in Venezuela founded in 1904. It is a regional newspaper based in Barquisimeto, in the state of Lara. El Impulso is a family owned business, and is currently managed by the fourth and fifth generation.

== History ==
=== Founding ===
Founded in Carora in 1904, El Impulso moved to Barquisimeto in 1919. Founded by Federico Carmona in 1904, it was passed on to his son in 1928, and was controlled by the Carmona family.

=== Bolivarian government ===
The paper ceased publication on 15 September 2014 due to the lack of printing paper and financial problems, though it later was able to produce once again. in 2018, the newspaper released a statement explaining that the circulation of physical copies was to cease due to newsprint shortages.

== See also ==
- List of newspapers in Venezuela
