= El Informador (Barquisimeto) =

Venezuelan regional newspaper

- Type: Daily newspaper
- Publisher: El Informador C.A.
- Founded: 30 January 1968
- Language: Spanish
- Headquarters: Barquisimeto, Venezuela

El Informador is a Venezuelan regional newspaper, headquartered in Barquisimeto, in the state of Lara.

On 15 February 2018, as a result of shortages of paper, the newspaper stopped circulating on Fridays and Saturdays until further notice. Further, on the edition of 19 February 2018 of the newspaper, it reduced its color usage and page count to 16 per day.

== See also ==
- List of newspapers in Venezuela
