= List of newspapers in Venezuela =

This is a list of newspapers in Venezuela, both national and regional. It also includes newspapers with other languages and themes.

== National ==
Newspaper	Edition city	Digital edition
El Universal	Caracas	http://www.eluniversal.com
El Nacional	Caracas	http://www.el-nacional.com
El Diario	Caracas	http://eldiario.com
Tal Cual	Caracas	http://www.talcualdigital.com/
El Nuevo País	Caracas	http://elnuevopais.net
2001	Caracas	http://www.2001.com.ve
Últimas Noticias	Caracas	http://www.ultimasnoticias.com.ve
Correo del Orinoco	Caracas	http://www.correodelorinoco.gob.ve/
Diario VEA	Caracas	https://diariovea.com.ve/

== Regional ==
=== Anzoátegui state ===
Newspaper	Edition city	Digital edition
El Tiempo	Puerto La Cruz	http://www.eltiempo.com.ve
Metropolitano	Barcelona	http://www.diariometropolitano.com.ve/
Antorcha	El Tigre	http://www.diarioantorcha.com
Impacto	Anaco	http://www.diarioimpacto.com.ve
Nueva Prensa de Oriente	Barcelona	http://www.nuevaprensa.web.ve/
Mundo Oriental	El Tigre	http://www.mundo-oriental.com.ve/
La Prensa	Puerto La Cruz	https://web.archive.org/web/20040528095105/http://www.laprensadigital.com.ve/
El Norte	Barcelona	https://web.archive.org/web/20051013020550/http://www.elnorte.com.ve/

=== Apure state ===
Newspaper	Edition city	Digital edition
Visión Apureña	San Fernando de Apure	http://www.visionapurena.com/

=== Aragua state ===
Newspaper	Edition city	Digital edition
El Siglo	Maracay	http://www.elsiglo.com.ve
El Clarín	La Victoria	http://www.elclarin.net.ve
El Aragüeño	Maracay	https://elaragueno.com.ve/
El Periodiquito	Maracay	http://www.elperiodiquito.com/
El Impreso	Cagua	

=== Barinas state ===
Newspaper	Edition city	Digital edition
De Frente	Barinas	http://www.defrentebarinas.com/
La Prensa	Barinas	http://www.laprensadebarinas.com.ve
El Diario de los Llanos	Barinas	

=== Bolívar state ===
Newspaper	Edition city	Digital edition
El Expreso	Ciudad Bolívar	http://www.diarioelexpreso.com.ve
Correo del Caroní	Ciudad Guayana	http://www.correodelcaroni.com
El Diario de Guayana	Ciudad Guayana	http://www.eldiariodeguayana.com.ve
Nueva Prensa	Ciudad Guayana	http://www.nuevaprensa.com.ve
Extra	Puerto Ordaz	https://web.archive.org/web/20050202214332/http://www.diarioextra.com.ve/
El Progreso	Ciudad Bolívar	https://web.archive.org/web/20051001004720/http://diarioelprogreso.com/
El Guayanés	Puerto Ordaz	
El Bolivarense	Ciudad Bolívar	

=== Carabobo state ===
Newspaper	Edition city	Digital edition
El Carabobeño	Valencia	http://www.el-carabobeno.com
Notitarde	Valencia	http://www.notitarde.com
La Calle	Valencia	http://www.diariolacalle.net/
La Costa	Puerto Cabello	http://www.diariolacosta.com

=== Cojedes state ===
Newspaper	Edition city	Digital edition
Las Noticias de Cojedes	San Carlos	http://www.lasnoticiasdecojedes.com
La Opinión de Cojedes	San Carlos	http://www.laopinion.com.ve/

=== Delta Amacuro state ===
Newspaper	Edition city	Digital edition
Notidiario	Tucupita	http://www.notidiario.com.ve/

=== Falcón state ===
Newspaper	Edition city	Digital edition
La Mañana	Coro	https://web.archive.org/web/20160303175715/http://www.lamanana.com.ve/
Nuevo Día	Coro	http://www.nuevodia.com.ve
El Falconiano	Coro	http://www.el-falconiano.com/
Médano	Punto Fijo	

=== Guárico state ===
Newspaper	Edition city	Digital edition
El Nacionalista	San Juan de los Morros	https://web.archive.org/web/20100209034943/http://www.elnacionalista.com.ve/
La Antena	San Juan de los Morros	https://web.archive.org/web/20150419192823/http://www.diariolaantena.com.ve/
La Prensa del Llano	San Juan de los Morros	
Diario Los Llanos	Valle de la Pascua	

=== Lara state ===
Newspaper	Edition city	Digital edition
El Impulso	Barquisimeto	http://www.elimpulso.com
El Informador	Barquisimeto	http://www.elinformador.com.ve
La Prensa	Barquisimeto	http://www.laprensalara.com.ve
El Diario de Lara	Barquisimeto	http://www.eldiariodelara.com/
Diario Hoy	Barquisimeto	
El Caroreño	Carora	

=== Mérida state ===
Newspaper	Edition city	Digital edition
Diario de los Andes	Mérida	http://www.diariodelosandes.com
Diario Frontera	Mérida	http://www.diariofrontera.com
Cambio de Siglo	Mérida	http://www.cambiodesiglo.net
El Vigía	El Vigía	http://www.diarioelvigia.net
Pico Bolívar	Mérida	https://web.archive.org/web/20040827202901/http://www.picobolivar.com.ve/

=== Miranda state ===
Newspaper	Edition city	Digital edition
Avance	Los Teques	https://diarioavance.com/
La Región	Los Teques	http://www.diariolaregion.net/
La Voz	Guarenas	http://www.diariolavoz.net

=== Monagas state ===
Newspaper	Edition city	Digital edition
El Periódico de Monagas	Maturín	http://www.elperiodicodemonagas.com.ve
La Verdad de Monagas	Maturín	http://www.laverdaddemonagas.com
La Prensa de Monagas	Maturín	http://www.laprensademonagas.info
El Sol de Maturín	Maturín	http://www.elsoldematurin.info
El Oriental	Maturín	https://web.archive.org/web/20140328053450/http://www.eloriental.com.ve/site/

=== Nueva Esparta state ===
Newspaper	Edition city	Digital edition
Sol de Margarita	Porlamar	http://www.elsoldemargarita.com.ve
Diario del Caribe	Porlamar	http://www.diariodelcaribe.com
Diario Caribazo	Porlamar	http://www.diariocaribazo.net
La Hora	Porlamar	http://www.lahora.com

=== Portuguesa state ===
Newspaper	Edition city	Digital edition
De Frente	Acarigua	http://www.defrenteportuguesa.com
El Periódico de Occidente	Guanare	http://www.periodicodeoccidente.com.ve
Última Hora	Acarigua	http://www.ultimahoradigital.com
El Regional	Acarigua	https://web.archive.org/web/20180108211657/http://elregional.net.ve/

=== Sucre state ===
Newspaper	Edition city	Digital edition
Región	Cumaná	http://www.diarioregion.com.ve/
El Periódico de Sucre	Carúpano	
Provincia	Cumaná	
Siglo 21	Cumaná	

=== Táchira state ===
Newspaper	Edition city	Digital edition
Diario de los Andes	San Cristóbal	http://www.diariodelosandes.com
La Nación	San Cristóbal	http://www.lanacion.com.ve

=== Trujillo state ===
Newspaper	Edition city	Digital edition
Diario de los Andes	Valera	http://www.diariodelosandes.com
El Tiempo	Valera	http://www.diarioeltiempo.com.ve

=== Vargas state ===
Newspaper	Edition city	Digital edition
Diario Puerto	Maiquetía	https://web.archive.org/web/20060719041632/http://www.diariopuerto.com/
La Verdad	Maiquetía	

=== Yaracuy state ===
Newspaper	Edition city	Digital edition
El Diario de Yaracuy	San Felipe	http://www.eldiariodeyaracuy.com/
Yaracuy al Día	San Felipe	https://web.archive.org/web/20051119214254/http://www.yaracuyaldia.net/
El Yaracuyano	San Felipe	

=== Zulia state ===
Newspaper	Edition city	Digital edition
Panorama	Maracaibo	http://www.panorama.com.ve/
Diario La Verdad	Maracaibo	http://www.laverdad.com
Version Final	Maracaibo	http://www.versionfinal.com.ve
El Regional del Zulia	Ciudad Ojeda	http://www.elregionaldelzulia.com

== Economic newspapers ==
Newspaper	Edition city	Digital edition
El Mundo	Caracas	https://web.archive.org/web/20120103085611/http://elmundo.com.ve/
Reporte	Caracas	http://www.diarioreporte.com

== Sports newspapers ==
Newspaper	Edition city	Digital edition
Meridiano	Caracas	http://www.meridiano.com.ve
Líder	Caracas	http://www.liderendeportes.com

== Catholic or religion-themed ==
Newspaper	Edition city	Digital edition
Diario Católico	San Cristóbal	http://www.diariocatolico.com.ve

== Ethnic minorities ==
Newspaper	Edition city	Minority	Digital edition
Nuevo Mundo Israelita	Caracas	Jewish Community	http://www.nmidigital.com

== Other languages ==
Newspaper	Edition city	Language	Digital edition
Latin American Herald Tribune	Caracas	English	http://www.laht.com
Correio da Venezuela	Caracas	Portuguese	http://www.correiodevenezuela.com
La Voce D’Italia	Caracas	Italian	http://www.voce.com.ve

== Weekly newspapers ==
Newspaper	Edition city	Digital edition
Descifrado	Caracas	http://www.descifrado.com/
Quinto Día	Caracas	http://www.quintodia.com/
La Razón	Caracas	http://www.larazon.net
Las Verdades de Miguel	Caracas	http://www.lasverdadesdemiguel.com.ve/

== Free daily newspapers ==
Newspaper	Edition city	Digital edition
Ciudad CCS	Caracas	http://www.ciudadccs.org.ve
Primera Hora	Caracas	https://web.archive.org/web/20100820000019/http://impresodigital.el-nacional.com/primerahora/

== Defunct ==
Newspaper	Edition city	Last year	Digital edition
The Daily Journal	Caracas	2008	https://web.archive.org/web/20061109011249/http://www.dj.com.ve/
Abril	Caracas	2003	http://www.abril.com.ve
La Religión	Caracas		http://www.iglesia.org.ve
Así es La Noticia	Caracas	2004	
El Globo	Caracas		
Venetzueler Vochnblat	Caracas	1964	

== Online ==
Newspaper	Edition city	Digital edition
Abrebrecha	Caracas	http://www.abrebrecha.com
Agencia Venezolana de Noticias	Caracas	
Analítica	Caracas	http://www.analitica.com
Aporrea	Caracas	http://www.aporrea.org
Armando.Info		
Confirmado	Caracas	http://www.confirmado.com.ve
Efecto Cocuyo	Caracas	https://efectococuyo.com/
Entorno Inteligente	Caracas	http://www.entornointeligente.com
Informe21	Caracas	http://www.informe21.com
Minuto59	Caracas	http://www.minuto59.com
Noticias al Día y a la Hora	Caracas	https://www.noticiasaldiayalahora.co
Noticias24	Caracas	https://web.archive.org/web/20180404022628/http://www.noticias24.com/
Noticiero Digital	Caracas	http://www.noticierodigital.com
El Pitazo		
Prodavinci		
Reporte360	Caracas	https://web.archive.org/web/20100927145524/http://reporte360.com/
El Universal Daily News	Caracas	http://www.eluniversal.com/eng_index.shtml
UnPais.Com	Caracas	http://www.unpais.com
Venezuela Today	Caracas	http://www.venezuelatoday.net

== Daily Newsletters ==
Newsletter	Edition city	Website
Arepita	Caracas	http://www.soyarepita.com
La Ceiba	Caracas	http://www.ramonmuchacho.com

== See also ==
- List of television networks in Venezuela
