= Diario Meridiano =

Spanish-language daily newspaper in Venezuela

Meridiano
- Type: Daily sports newspaper
- Format: Tabloid
- Owner(s): Bloque De Armas
- Founded: 3 November 1969
- Language: Spanish
- Headquarters: Caracas, Venezuela
- Website: www.meridiano.com.ve

Meridiano (Diario Meridiano) is a Venezuelan national daily sports newspaper owned by Bloque De Armas, which also owns the sports network Meridiano Televisión.

== See also ==
- List of newspapers in Venezuela
