= Tyszowce =

Town in Lublin Voivodeship, Poland

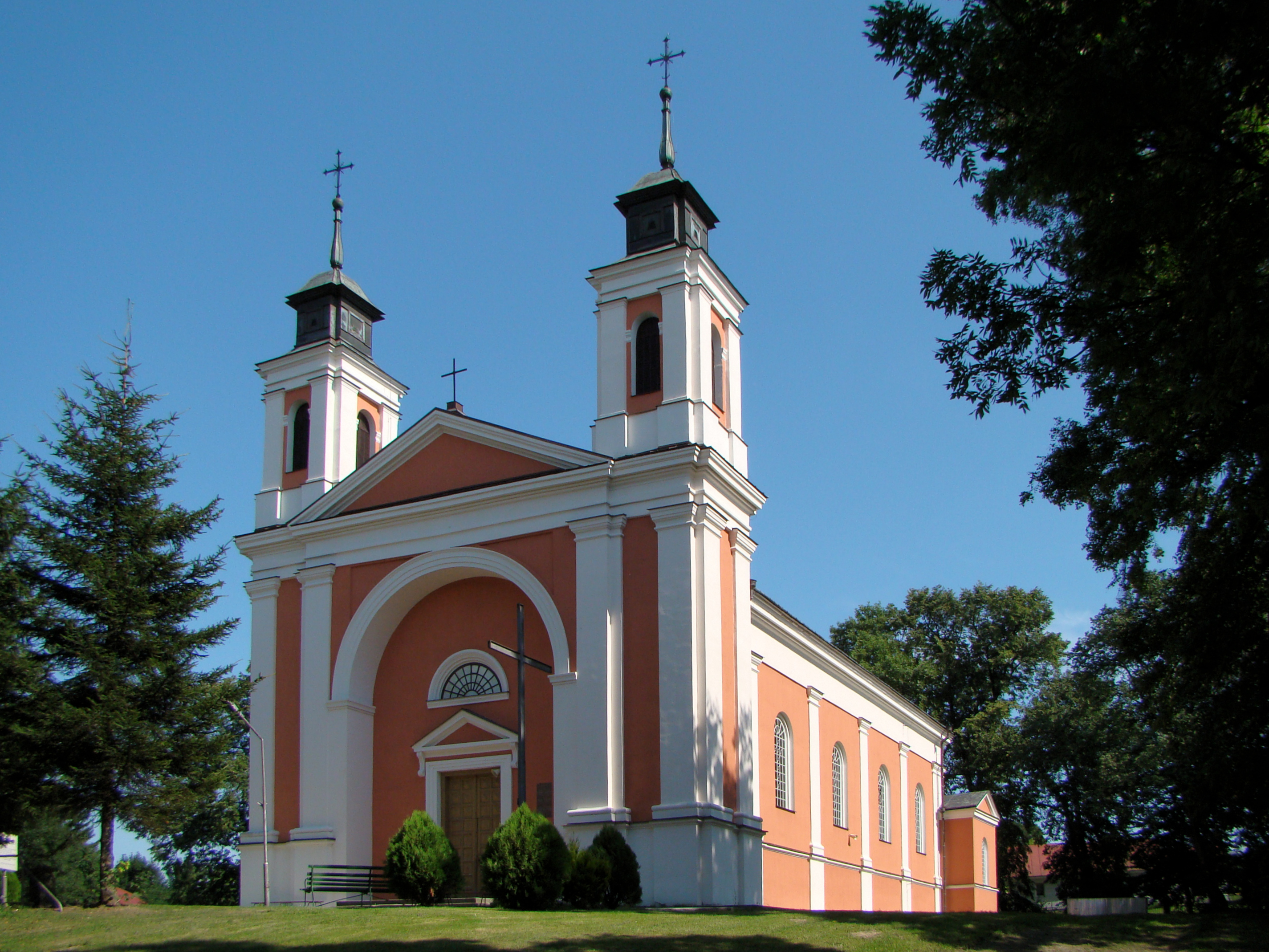
- Saint Leonard church in Tyszowce

- Coat of arms

- Location within Poland
- Coordinates: 50°37′6″N 23°42′35″E
- Country: Poland
- Voivodeship: Lublin
- County: Tomaszów
- Gmina: Tyszowce
- Town rights: 1419

Government
  - Mayor: Robert Bondyra (PiS)

Area
  - Total: 18.52 km^{2} (7.15 sq mi)

Population (2019)
  - Total: 2,091
  - Density: 112.9/km^{2} (292.4/sq mi)
- Time zone: UTC+1 (CET)
  - Summer (DST): UTC+2 (CEST)
- Postal code: 22–630
- Vehicle registration: LTM

Tyszowce (Polish: [tɨˈʂɔft͡sɛ]; Yiddish: טישעוויץ, romanized: Tishevitz) is a town in Tomaszów County, Lublin Voivodeship, in south-eastern Poland, with 2,091 inhabitants (2019). In 1655 the Tyszowce Confederation was formed here.

== History ==
=== Medieval period ===
The history of Tyszowce dates back to the Middle Ages, when a gord probably existed among swampy meadows of the Huczwa river. Following the Mongol Invasion of Poland, in which most local towns were burned to the ground, Tyszowce emerged as a center of trade and administration, at the expense of the destroyed town of Czermno. By the 15th century, Tyszowce had the status of a ducal town, with Magdeburg rights granted to it probably in the early 14th century by Siemowit IV, Duke of Masovia. The charter was confirmed in 1453 by Duke of Bełz, Władysław I.

In 1462, the Duchy of Bełz was incorporated into the Kingdom of Poland, and renamed into Bełz Voivodeship. Tyszowce was named a royal town, and a starostwo was created, consisting of the town itself, and four local villages. In 1500, Tyszowce was destroyed in a Crimean Tatar raid; the destruction was so widespread that for the next 10 years no taxes were collected.

=== Modern period ===
In the period known as Polish Golden Age, Tyszowce began to prosper, together with whole Polish–Lithuanian Commonwealth. Some time in the early 16th century, a castle was constructed, which served as a residence of the starosta. The castle was probably wooden, located in the outskirts of the town, and was first mentioned in documents from 1564. Tyszowce was at that time protected by an earth rampart, reinforced with wood. These fortifications were destroyed during the mid-17th-century wars.

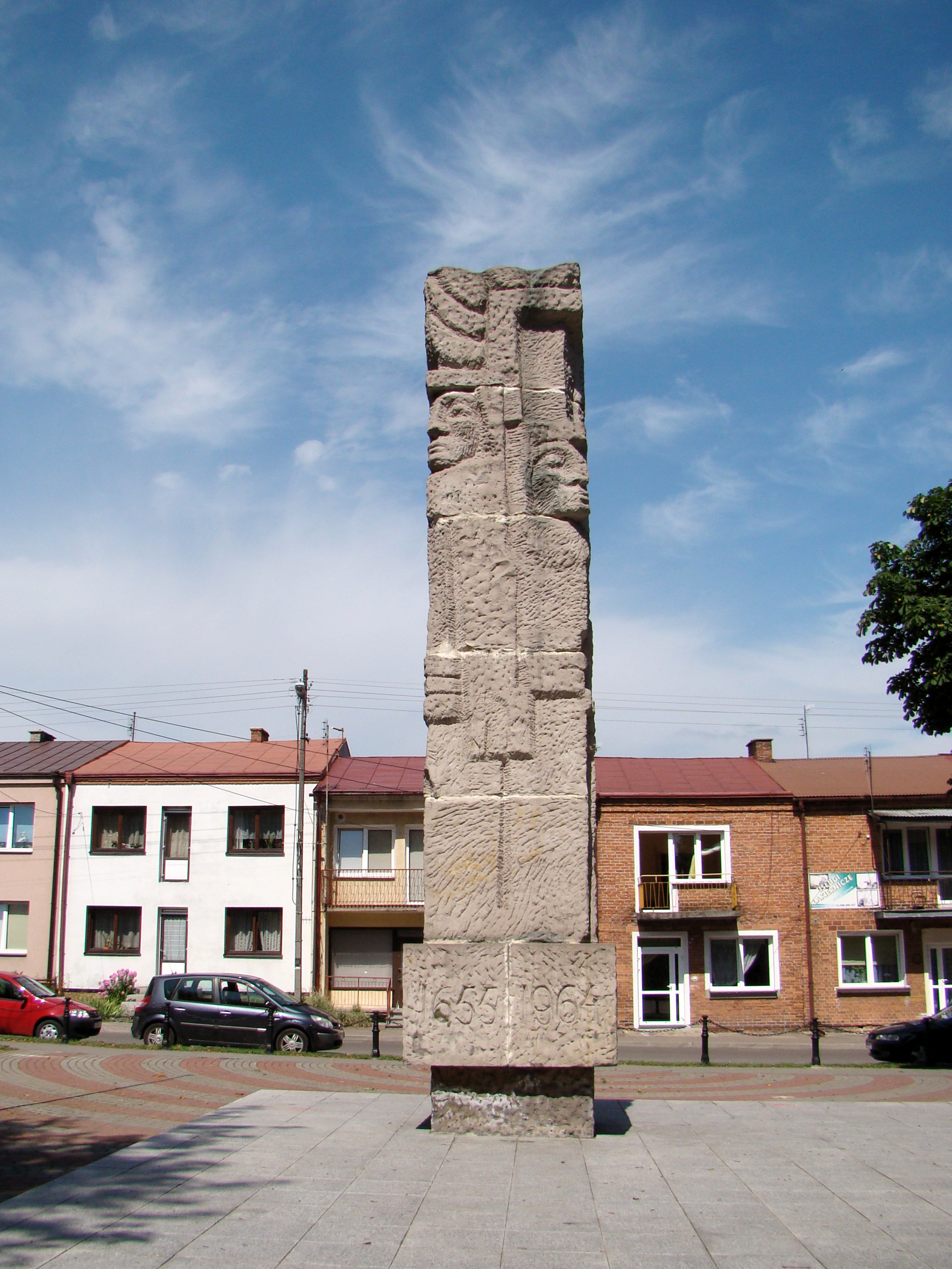
Tyszowce Confederation Monument

In the early 17th century, Tyszowce was raided by Tatars, and in 1649, the town was destroyed during the Khmelnytsky Uprising. Further destruction took place in the 1650s, when Tyszowce was ransacked by Cossacks, Russians and Tatars. On December 29, 1655, the Tyszowce Confederation was signed here, with the purpose of pushing Swedes out of Poland, and bringing back King John II Casimir Vasa. The document was signed by Hetmans Stanislaw Potocki and Stanislaw Lanckoronski, as well as several senators, military leaders and members of nobility.

In 1767, Tyszowce became private property, and five years later, following the First Partition of Poland, the town was annexed by the Habsburg Empire, as part of Austrian Galicia. Its population was divided between 200 Christian and 80 Jewish families.

In 1803, Tyszowce burned in a great fire. After the Polish victory in Austro-Polish War of 1809, it was included within the short-lived Duchy of Warsaw, and after the duchy's dissolution, since 1815 until 1916, the town belonged to Russian-controlled Congress Poland. In 1847, its population reached almost 3,000, divided between Roman Catholics, Greek Catholics and Jews, and Tyszowce remained a private property of the Glogowski family. On May 18, 1863, the town was seized by rebel forces during the January Uprising. In 1869, Russian authorities stripped Tyszowce of its town charter, as a revenge for widespread support of the uprising.

In 1907 Tyszowce burned again, and in 1910, population of the village reached its maximum, at 7,620. Tyszowce suffered during World War I, it was destroyed, and by 1921, population was reduced to 4,420. In the 1921 census, 77.8% of the population declared Polish nationality, 20.1% declared Jewish nationality and 2.0% declared Ukrainian nationality.

=== World War II ===
Following the German-Soviet invasion of Poland, which started World War II in September 1939, Tyszowce was occupied by Germany until 1944. About 1,000 Jews fled across the Bug River to the Soviet-occupied part of Poland. In 1940, a forced labor camp was established in Tyszowce. Several Poles who were either born or lived and worked in Tyszowce, including the local police chief, were murdered by the Russians in the Katyn massacre in 1940.

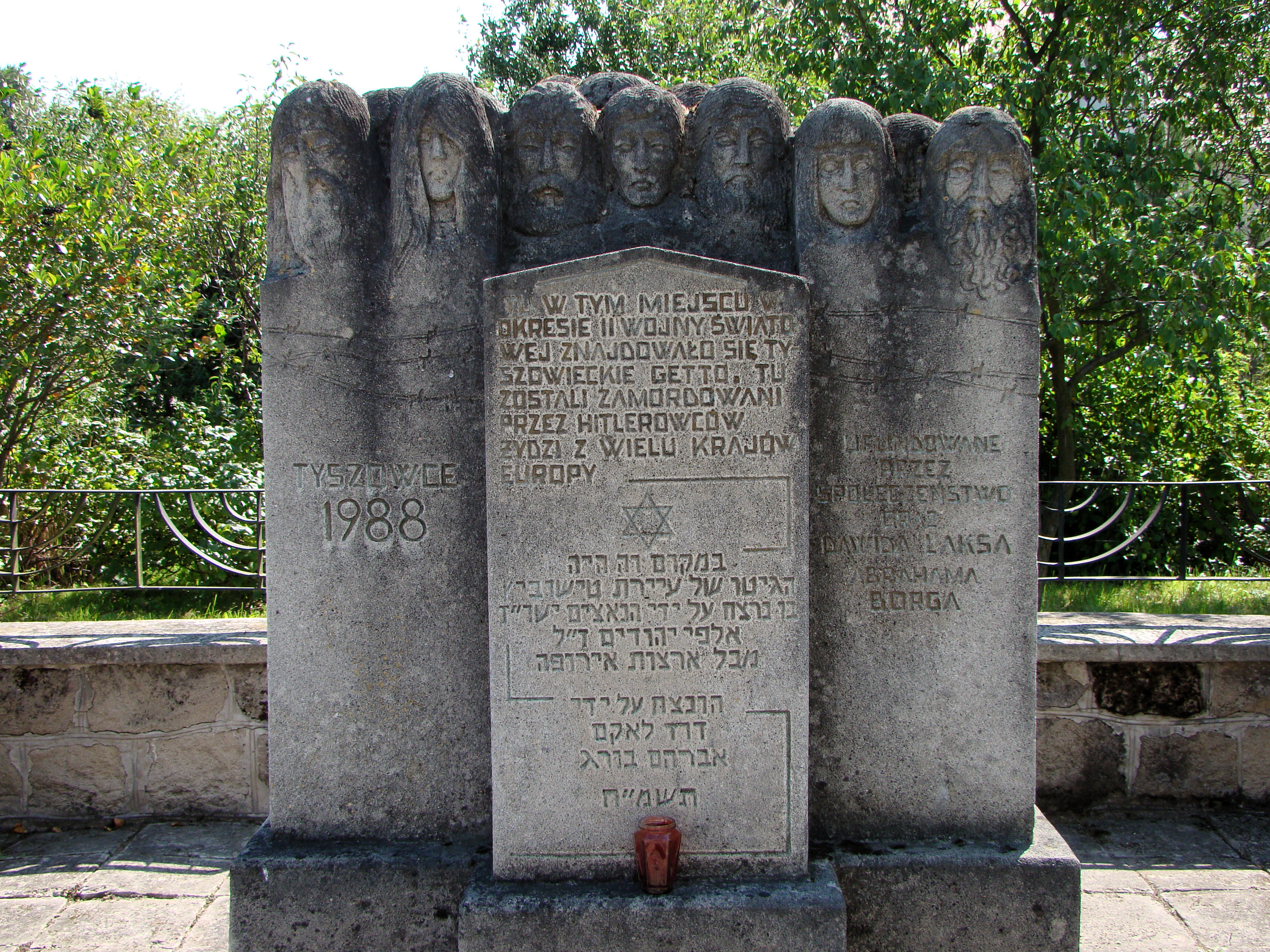
Holocaust memorial

During the night of April 16, 1942, SS troops, Gestapo and German police launched a massive execution of Jews in Tyszowce. Jews were brought to the square before the former public bath, where several hundred Jews were shot. The Nazis threw the corpses into a ditch. In 1942, about 2,000 Jews altogether, including some from German-occupied Czechoslovakia, were deported to the Bełżec extermination camp. Another 150 Tyszowce Jews were deported to a labor camp in Zamość. According to some sources, between June 1942 and the end of 1943, approximately 1,000 Jews from Tyszowce and surrounding towns were executed. Only a handful of Tyszowce Jews survived the war.

During World War II, 60% of Tyszowce was destroyed.
