= James Hanson, Baron Hanson =

British businessman (1922–2004)

The Right Honourable The Lord Hanson
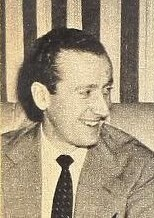
- Hanson in 1953
- Born: 20 January 1922; Huddersfield, Yorkshire, England
- Died: 1 November 2004 (aged 82); Newbury, Berkshire, England
- Occupation: Company director
- Political party: Conservative
- Spouse: Geraldine Kaelin (m. 1959)
- Children: 2, including Robert Hanson

Member of the House of Lords
- Lord Temporal
- Life peerage 30 June 1983 – 1 November 2004

James Edward Hanson, Baron Hanson (20 January 1922 – 1 November 2004) was an English industrialist who built his businesses through the process of leveraged buyouts through Hanson plc. Hanson's billion-dollar empire earned him the nickname "Lord Moneybags".

== Early life ==
James Hanson was educated at Elland Grammar School near Halifax and at the short-lived Maiden Erlegh House School at Earley, formerly the home of Solly Joel. During the Second World War he served as a staff officer with 7th Battalion, the Duke of Wellington's Regiment, before going into the family transport business.

== Career ==
Hanson and Gordon White (later Lord White of Hull) formed a partnership in the 1960s, and began a greetings card business. The two men also began buying other companies, in such diverse industries as fertilisers and bricks, which all sat under the umbrella of a listed entity called Hanson Trust (later renamed simply Hanson). By the 1980s, the Hanson Trust operated in both Europe and North America, purchasing under-managed businesses in sectors such as batteries, locks and safes. He was knighted in 1976 and created Baron Hanson, of Edgerton in the County of West Yorkshire, a life peerage, on 30 June 1983.

Hanson's greatest deal was the 1989 purchase of Imperial Group, a British tobacco conglomerate with a diversified portfolio of brand leaders in tobacco, brewing and food, and with a cash rich pension fund, that was his real target. Hanson's team turned up in Bristol the morning of the takeover to find the Pension Trustees had closed the Fund the evening before, denying him the asset. Lord Hanson had expected to use the Pension Fund as consideration for the transaction. However, it was funded entirely by selling many of Imperial Group's subsidiaries, leaving him with a business that made an operating-profit margin of nearly 50%.

Hanson was a prominent corporate raider, which ultimately worked against him in a failed bid for ICI Group, a chemical group, in 1991 which was at the time the UK's third-largest company. ICI, led by its chairman Sir Denys Henderson hired Goldman Sachs to look into Lord Hanson's business dealings, and they found that Lord Hanson's partner, White, was running racehorses at shareholders' expense. Lord Hanson had purchased 2.8% of the firm, but backed away from the takeover.

The chief characteristic of a Hanson company was that of a short-term cash-generating machine, involving large scale redundancies, and the slashing of research and development to the minimum - all the hallmarks of an asset stripping operation.

== Politics ==
Hanson was a lifelong Conservative Party supporter and one of its largest financial donors during the 1980s.

Hanson was well known for his support of ex-Conservative MP Neil Hamilton, who became famous for his involvement in the "cash-for-questions affair" in the mid-1990s. He was also an active "Eurosceptic", opposed to Britain joining the Euro zone, and was a founding member of Business for Britain, an anti-European Union (EU) organisation. He was also a member of the Bruges Group, which advocated a substantial renegotiation of Britain's relationship with the EU, or if that was not possible, total withdrawal from the EU.

== Personal life ==
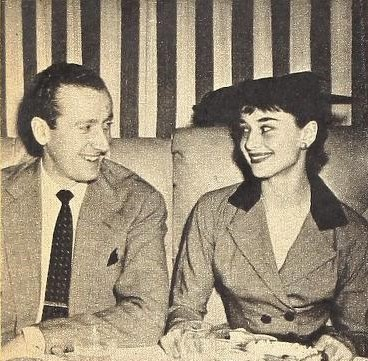
James Hanson and Audrey Hepburn, 1953

Hanson dated Jean Simmons and Joan Collins and was engaged to Audrey Hepburn for almost a year, until she called off the marriage.

In 1959 Hanson married Geraldine, née Kaelin, an American divorcée. He became stepfather to her daughter, and the couple had two sons of their own, Robert (born 1960) and Brook (1964–2014).

Hanson was particularly known for being a Concorde enthusiast, and flew well over 100 flights on the aircraft, eventually losing count. He particularly stated the importance of having "2 very good meetings this morning, uh not tired".

== Death ==
Hanson died, aged 82, on 1 November 2004 after a long battle with cancer, at his home near Newbury, Berkshire.

The newspaper The Independent called him on his death "the very archetype of the Thatcherite tycoon".

== Arms ==
Coat of arms of James Hanson, Baron Hanson
Crest On a wreath Or and Vert a demi chestnut horse Proper charged on the shoulder with a rose Argent barbed seeded slipped and leaved Proper. Escutcheon Vert in fess point a rose Argent barbed and seeded Proper between six like roses three and three in pale. Supporters Dexter a bulldog in trian aspect with a Viking helmet of the seventh century gilded and verde antico on his head Proper, and sinister an American bald eagle also Proper. Motto Prima Peto

== Bibliography ==
- Alex Brummer and Roger Cowe, Hanson: A Biography (Fourth Estate, 1994) (ISBN 1857021894)
