= Diario VEA =

Diario VEA is a daily newspaper in Venezuela. It was founded in Caracas in 2003. It is owned by the government. Its slogan is Comprometidos con Venezuela ("Committed to Venezuela"). Its director is Guillermo García Ponce. It comes in a tabloid format. It has been described as "the mouthpiece of the Bolivarian Revolution".

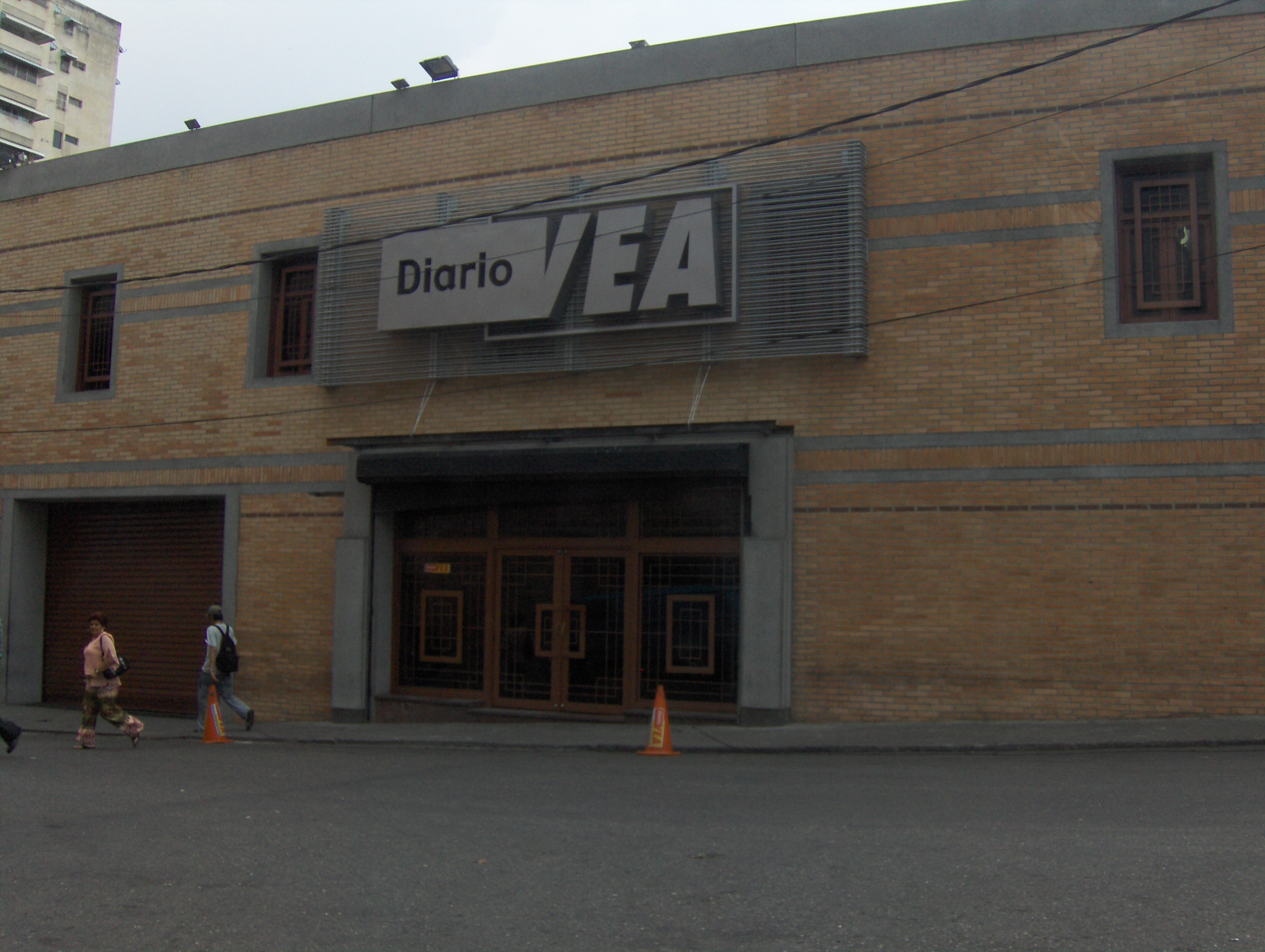
Diario VEA Offices in Caracas

== Politics ==
Ideologically Diario VEA is on the left side of the political spectrum, and as a result of its ownership by the state, it is much friendlier to President Hugo Chávez than most of Venezuela's dailies; hence its editorial line is critical of the United States and the Venezuelan opposition, as well as the Colombian government.

== See also ==
- List of newspapers in Venezuela
