= Venetzueler Vochnblat =

Venezuelan newspaper

- Type: Weekly newspaper (until 1961); Daily newspaper (1961-1964)
- Founded: 1959
- Ceased publication: 1964
- Language: Yiddish; Hebrew; Spanish
- Country: Venezuela

The Venetzueler Vochnblat (Yiddish: ווענעזועלער וואכנבלאט; Spanish: Semanario Venezolano; Venezuelan Weekly) was a newspaper founded by Abraham Stempel (who years later founded Prensa Israelita) in Caracas, Venezuela, in 1959. It was a tri-lingual paper, being published in Yiddish, Hebrew and Spanish. Originally it was published weekly but two years after its beginning was changed into a monthly newspaper, until 1964 when it was closed.
