= Diario 2001 =

Venezuelan newspaper on Caracas

2001
- Type: Daily newspaper
- Publisher: Bloque De Armas
- Founded: 1973
- Headquarters: Caracas, Venezuela
- Circulation: 85,000
- Website: 2001.com.ve

2001 (Diario 2001) is a Venezuelan newspaper. It was established by Bloque De Armas in 1973, launching its first edition on 2 July 1973 under the directorship of Rafael Poleo. Initially launched as a competitor to the evening newspaper El Mundo of rival media group Cadena Capriles, its sales did not meet expectations (despite its distinguishing use of colour printing) and it converted to a morning newspaper.

== See also ==
- List of newspapers in Venezuela
