= Cadena Capriles =

Venezuelan media company

- Formation: 1941
- Type: Media company
- Headquarters: Caracas, Venezuela
- Parent organization: Latam Media Holding N.V.

Cadena Capriles is a Venezuelan media company that owns the newspapers Últimas Noticias and El Mundo. Últimas Noticias is the highest selling daily newspaper in Venezuela.

== History ==
It was founded by Miguel Ángel Capriles Ayala in 1941 with the creation of Últimas Noticias, after the measures implemented by Venezuelan President Medina Angarita loosened restrictions on Venezuelan media.

Following the death of Capriles Ayala in 1996 taken over in 1998 by his son, Miguel Ángel Capriles López. Towards the end of the twentieth century Cadena Capriles was (along with Bloque De Armas) one of the two largest producers of Venezuelan magazines, including current affairs journal Élite and the women's magazines Páginas and Kena.

=== 2013 sale ===
On 31 May 2013, Cadena Capriles was sold to an unknown party and commentary in its newspapers criticizing the Venezuelan government declined. This was supposedly due to the new owners of the company being close to the Venezuelan government. It was alleged that Cadena Capriles was purchased by the "chavista banker", Victor Vargas.

Following alleged censorship in favor of the Venezuelan government by the director of Últimas Noticias during the 2014 Venezuelan protests, Chief Researcher Tamoa Calzadilla, Media VP Nathalie Alvaray along with others resigned. In only a year, more than 120 journalists resigned or were fired.
