= Últimas Noticias =

Venezuelan tabloid newspaper

- Type: Daily newspaper
- Owner: Robert Hanson
- Editor-in-chief: Eleazar Díaz Rangel (until 2019)
- Deputy editor: Danisbel Gómez Morillo
- Founded: 16 September 1941
- Headquarters: Caracas, Venezuela
- Circulation: 300,000 (2013)
- Sister newspapers: El Mundo Economía y Negocios, Líder en Deportes
- Website: ultimasnoticias.com.ve

Últimas Noticias is a tabloid newspaper in Venezuela founded in 1941 after pro-freedom measures implemented by President Isaías Medina Angarita and was the largest circulated newspaper in Venezuela prior to 2014. Le Monde and Reuters described it in 2024 as a "pro-government" newspaper. The newspaper became more critical of chavismo in the late 2000s and early 2010s. After it was bought in 2013 by British financier Robert Hanson, its editorial line became less critical of the government.

== History ==
Últimas Noticias was founded in Caracas on 16 September 1941 after the pro-freedom measures implemented by President Isaías Medina Angarita. It initially bore the name Diario del Pueblo (the people's newspaper), and was created by Víctor Simone D'Lima, "Kotepa" Delgado, Vaughan Salas Lozada and Pedro Beroes. Miguel Ángel Capriles Ayala acquired the majority of the shares in 1948. He was the president of La Cadena Capriles, until his death in 1996. His son, Miguel Angel Capriles López assumed that position in 1998 until 2013, starting a modernization process that lasted more than 12 years. On 16 October 2000 it was relaunched, adopting a more colloquial tone and aiming to be more of a guide to daily life.

In June 2002, Ultimas Noticias began printing in colour on every page and launched its Sunday edition aimed to a more middle class audience. From 2004 to 2006 it launched four regional editions (for different areas of Greater Caracas) in addition to the national one. In 2009 it started the integration of all its newspapers with digital platforms and moved to a state-of-the-art facility, the most modern newsroom in the country, in 2012. In 2013, the newspaper was sold to an "investment group" that was allegedly more sympathetic to the Venezuelan government for $160–180 million.

Ultimas Noticias was described as a tabloid in 1958 by Time magazine, in 2007 by The New York Times, and in 2019 by The Guardian.

BBC Monitoring stated in 2019 that Últimas Noticias has "a predominantly pro-government stance"; in the same year, The Guardian characterized the paper as a "pro-Maduro tabloid". In 2007, The New York Times said the "tabloid [was] sympathetic to President Hugo Chavez".

== Changes in the newspaper ==
Until 1999, the visual format of Últimas Noticias did not follow any particular formula and according to one commentator, the newspaper looked disorganized. But as of October 2000, certain new parameters were laid down in an effort to make the layout simpler and better organized. At the same time the newspaper adopted a more colloquial tone and aimed to be more of a guide to daily life.

In mid-2002 the newspaper began printing in colour on every page. Between 2004 and 2006 it launched four regional editions (for different areas of Greater Caracas) in addition to the national one.

In 2013, the British financier Robert Hanson bought Ultimas Noticias for his private company Hanson Family Holdings for a figure reported as US$98 million. In 2014, he was accused by newspaper staff of turning it into "a Socialist Party mouthpiece", but the editor, Héctor Dávila, replied that his only instructions from Hanson were "to run a balanced and profitable newspaper". Following censorship by the newspapers director during the 2014 Venezuelan protests, Chief Researcher Tamoa Calzadilla along with others resigned. Nathalie Alvaray, the first woman Media VP in the country and leader of all the innovation and convergence projects resigned a week before.

In January 2015, Venezuelans responded on social media to the controversial headline, "Maduro's Tour Was a Success", portraying that President Nicolas Maduro's meeting with Saudi Arabia was successful despite other outlets saying otherwise. During the 2017 Venezuelan protests, Últimas Noticias reported that protester Juan Pablo Pernalete was killed with a captive bolt pistol and dismissed the theory that he was killed with a tear gas canister by security forces, causing outrage among readers.

=== Criticism of Venezuelan government ===
Últimas Noticias published investigative journalism that placed it at odds with the administration of Hugo Chávez in the August 2011 exposé by César Batiz of Derwick Associates, a firm accused of bribery and overbilling and the target of several lawsuits in the United States. .

=== 2024 Venezuelan political crisis ===
During the political crisis following the 2024 Venezuelan presidential election, Le Monde wrote that Carmela Longo, a journalist at the "pro-government" newspaper said she was fired shortly before she was arrested.
