= Poleo =

Poleo is a Spanish surname. It is also the Spanish word for Pennyroyal as well the name of a minty herb Poleo used in Oaxaca and the surrounding area as a hangover cure.

== People ==
Notable people with the surname include:

- Germania Poleo (born 1994), Venezuelan journalist
- Ivis Poleo (born 1963), Venezuelan swimmer
- Patricia Poleo (born 1965), Venezuelan journalist
- Rafael Poleo (born 1937), Venezuelan journalist and politician
