= Tovar Municipality =

Tovar Municipality may refer to:

- Tovar Municipality, Aragua
- Tovar Municipality, Mérida
