= Germania Poleo =

Venezuelan journalist

- Born: Germania Rodríguez Poleo; 1994 (age 30–31); Miami, United States
- Citizenship: United States
- Occupation: Journalist
- Employer(s): The Independent, Caracas Chronicles, CNN, Daily Mail
- Parent: Patricia Poleo
- Relatives: Rafael Poleo (grandfather)

Germania Rodríguez Poleo (born 1994) is a Venezuelan journalist. Germania has been a correspondent for The Independent in Miami, in addition to collaborating with media such as Caracas Chronicles, CNN and Daily Mail.

== Early life ==
In 2002 she accompanied her mother, Patricia Poleo, to the Venezuelan Attorney General's Office to denounce, along with journalist Ibéyise Pacheco, death threats by means of "anonymous telephone calls, e-mail and other means" and a defamatory article by the state agency Venpres that described both as "narco-journalists". Patricia Poleo and Pacheco took refuge afterwards in the United States embassy to ask for protection. Germania lived in Caracas until she was 11 years old, when she had to leave the country during the Hugo Chávez government due to persecution of her mother.

== Career ==
Germania has been a correspondent for The Independent in Miami, in addition to collaborating with media such as Caracas Chronicles, CNN and the Daily Mail.
