= Edgar C. Otálvora =

Venezuelan writer, politician and historian (1959–2026)

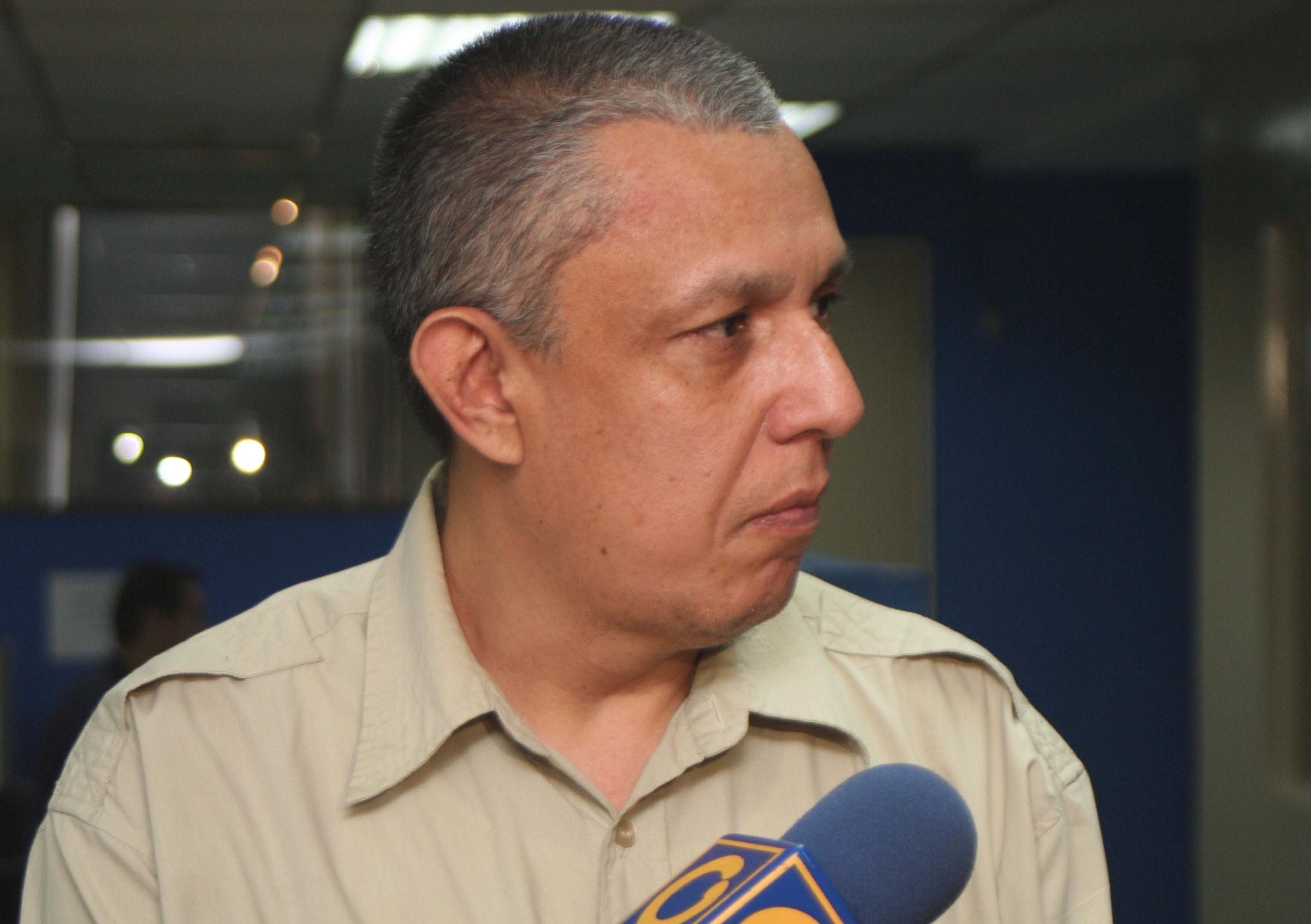
- Otálvora in 2009
- Born: 6 September 1959; Tovar, Mérida, Venezuela
- Died: 21 July 2026 (aged 66)
- Education: Economist, historian
- Alma mater: University of the Andes (Venezuela)
- Occupations: Columnist, writer, diplomatic, policy analyst, journalist
- Spouse: Olga Hernáiz Arnal
- Website: otalvora.blogspot.com

Edgar Omar Contreras Otálvora (6 September 1959 – 21 July 2026) was a Venezuelan intellectual, journalist, and politician. He held government and diplomatic positions. Otálvora was an expert in international politics and economics, and distinguished himself as an analyst of Latin American topics, with a focus on military, diplomatic, and political issues. He had been a columnist in Venezuelan and American newspapers, in addition to directing the newspaper El Nuevo Pais in Caracas from 2006 to 2010. He was a professor at the Central University of Venezuela. He was a close collaborator of former Venezuelan president Ramón J. Velásquez. He cultivated the biographical genre, being the first to write biographies of the 19th-century Venezuelan presidents Raimundo Andueza Palacio and Juan Pablo Rojas Paul, as well as the Colombian president Virgilio Barco Vargas. Columnist in Diario Las Américas of Miami.

== Early life and public career ==
Otálvora was born in Tovar on 6 September 1959. He obtained a bachelor's degree in economics from the University of the Andes, Venezuela in 1982 and in 2003 was awarded a master's degree in History of the Americas. He has taught at the School of International Studies and the graduate History of the Americas program at the Central University of Venezuela. In 1990, he was named Executive Secretary of the Presidential Committee for Colombian-Venezuelan Border Issues (COPAF). In 1993 he began the role of General Director of the Ministry of the Secretariat of the Presidency, alongside Ramón J. Velásquez, who would be declared president by the National Congress after a case was opened against then-president Carlos Andrés Pérez. From 1994 to 1999 he was Chief of the Political Departments of the Venezuelan embassies in Bogotá and Brasília, as well as Consul General in Belém do Pará, Brazil. He has been a consultant and advisor for Hewlett-Packard NCA Latin America, and the Friedrich Ebert Foundation.

== Journalism career ==
His journalism career began in 1980 as a columnist for the Diario Frontera in Mérida. He was part of the writing team of the Revista AZUL of the University of the Andes. His opinion columns were first published in 1982 in the newspaper El Nacional in Caracas and, soon after, in the newspaper El Universal as a critic in the Cultural Pages directed by Sofía Ímber. In the mid-1990s, he directed the magazine Venezuela en Colombia, edited in Bogotá. Specializing in topics in Latin American politics, he wrote the column Mirando el Vecindario (Looking Around the Neighborhood) in the newspaper El Mundo from 2004 to 2006. Upon taking the role of director of the newspaper El Nuevo País, he began production of Informe Otálvora, appearing in numerous online publications in Latin America. Editor of the news web portal Noticias Clic since 2011. Columnist in Diario Las Américas of Miami since March 2014.

== Conceptual art ==
In the 1980s he ventured into conceptual art and together with Luis Astorga Junquera created the Pleonasmo Group oriented towards performance art. He participated in the XLI Salon of Visual Arts "Arturo Michelena" (Valencia Atheneum, Valencia, 1982), the first occasion in which this salon opened the competition to "unconventional art". In 1983 the Pleonasmo Group was invited to the exhibition "Autoretrato" in the gallery "Espacio Alterno" of the National Art Gallery located in the Caracas Athenaeum, as part of the programming of the V International Theater Festival of Caracas.

== Death ==
Otálvora died on 21 July 2026, at the age of 66.

== Books and academic articles ==
- Venezuela de Trump a Trump (pasando por Biden) (2025) ISBN 9798291358818
- Venezuela Juego Trancado (2020) ASIN B08Q324J98 - ISBN 9798578700408
- De Caracas a Brasilia 46 años in Brasil:cercano y lejano (Edmundo González Urrutia. Coordinator. Caracas. Instituto de Estudios Parliamentario Fermín Toro - UCAB. 2019) ISBN 978-980-244-939-2
- Venezuela un problema global- Ebook. (2019) ASIN B07RG1QDMB
- Venezolanos en Fuga- Ebook. (2014) ASIN B00PGNOIJK
- La Década Roja de América Latina. Ebook. (2013) ASIN B00ESWXQ7U
- CASTRO & CHAVEZ (English edition) (2011) ASIN B005KT1IN4
- Un Barco Liberal (2011). (Biography of Virgilio Barco Vargas) ASIN B0050D1QAA
- Cooperación, integración o fusión militar en Suramérica (Cooperation, integration or merging of the armed forces in South America) in "Venezuela en el contexto de la seguridad regional" (Caracas, ILDIS, 2007)
- Retos y perspectivas de la integración energética en América Latina.(Coauthor). Kart-Peter Schütt y Flavio Carucci (Coordinators). (Caracas, ILDIS - Fundación Friedriech Ebert, 2007)
- Raimundo Andueza Palacio. (Biography).(Caracas, Biblioteca Biográfica Venezolana-Diario El Nacional, 2006). Digital Edition: ASIN B005CDICMS
- Aproximación a la agenda de seguridad de Venezuela con Brasil. (Approach to the security of Venezuela with Brazil agenda) (Caracas, ILDIS - Fundación Friedriech Ebert, 2005)
- Juan Pablo Rojas Paúl. (Biography).(Caracas, Biblioteca Biográfica Venezolana-Diario El Nacional, 2005. Digital Edition:ASIN B005CDIBEM
- La Crisis de la Corbeta Caldas. (The Crisis of the Corvette Caldas). (Caracas, Editorial Pomaire, 2003). Includes biographies of the former presidents Jaime Lusinchi and Virgilio Barco Vargas. Digital Edition: ASIN B0050E2N56
- RJV: La red de Liberales y Socialdemócratas. (RJV: Liberals and Social Democrats network) in "Ramón J. Velásquez. Estudios sobre una trayectoria al servicio de Venezuela". (Caracas, Universidad Metropolitana - Universidad de los Andes-Núcleo Táchira, 2003)
- Frontera en Tiempos de Globalización: El proyecto ZIF. (Border in times of globalization: the ZIF project) (Revista Venezolana de Economía y Ciencias Sociales, Universidad Central de Venezuela, Vol. 9, No.1, enero-abril 2003)
- La Paz Ramónica. (The Ramónica peace. Diary of a transitional Government in Venezuela). (Caracas, Editorial Pomaire, 1994)
- Eustoquio. (Biography of es:Eustoquio Gómez). (Caracas, Editorial Pomaire, 1993. Second Edition)
- La Frontera Occidental Venezolana: Un análisis tendencial (The border West of Venezuela: A trend analysis). In "La Frontera Occidental Venezolana. Propuestas de Política". (Coauthor). (Caracas, Comisión Presidencial para Asuntos Fronterizos Colombo-Venezolanos, 1992)
- El Estado venezolano en la era del Pac-Man: La política informática del Estado venezolano. (The Venezuelan State in the era of Pac-Man) In "27 Temas sobre Venezuela". (Caracas, Ediciones del Congreso de la República, 1988)
- París Mayo Junio 1968.(Mérida, Colección La Senda y El Surco. Facultad de Economía. Universidad de los Andes, 1980)
