= Francisco Usón =

Venezuelan ex-general

Francisco Usón is a former Venezuelan general who was arrested on May 22, 2004 after an interview with journalist Marta Colomina. On December 24, 2007, he was freed on a conditional release.

== Career and arrest ==
After graduating from the military academy, Usón held a number of positions, including Brigadier General and Chief of the National Budget Office, and Minister of Finance of Venezuela in 2002. On April 16, 2004, Usón appeared live on a Venezuelan television program hosted by journalist Marta Colomina. During his interview, Usón was questioned regarding the incidents surrounding the Fort Mara military base, where a fire in a punishment cell burned eight soldiers on March 30, 2004. He was arrested after claiming that the use of a flamethrower to create the fire would have meant premeditation, saying that “This is very, very serious if it ends up being true.”

Human rights groups have called the arrest biased, with the Human Rights Foundation calling it a violation of "his right to be free of arbitrary detainment, the right to speak freely, and the right to equal treatment and due process under the law." On December 24, 2007, Usón was freed on the conditions that he not comment about his case; not participate in any political events, marches, protests, or gatherings; not run for public office; and that he submit to a psychiatric evaluation.

== See also ==
- Political prisoners in Venezuela
