= Colonia Tovar =

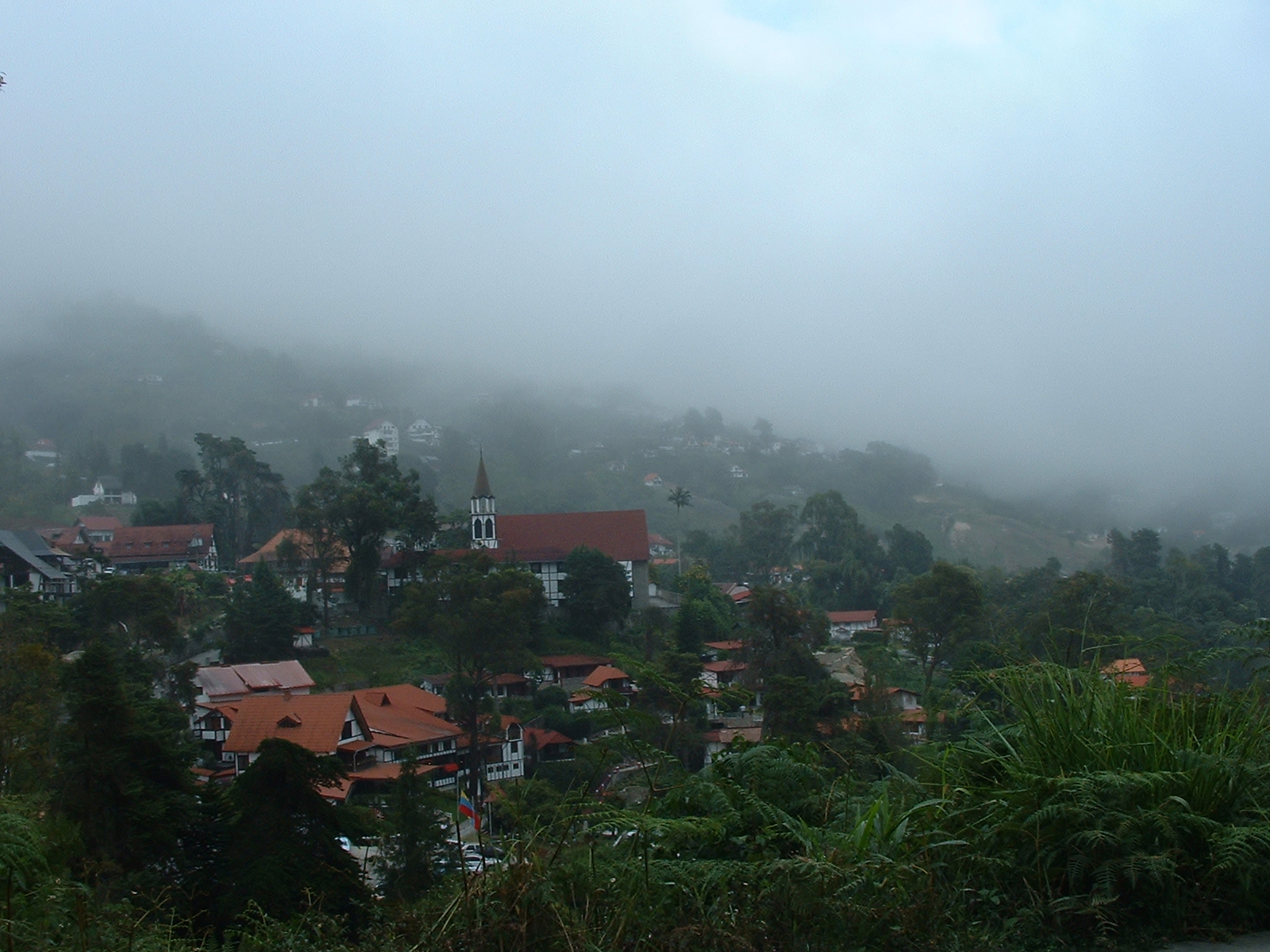

- Flag Coat of arms

- Location within Venezuela
- Coordinates: 10°24′20″N 67°17′22″W
- Country: Venezuela
- State: Aragua
- Municipality: Tovar Municipality
- Founded: 8 April 1843

Area
  - Total: 250 km^{2} (97 sq mi)
- Elevation: 1,800 m (5,900 ft)

Population (2016)
  - Total: 21,000
  - Density: 84/km^{2} (220/sq mi)
  - Demonym: Coloniero/a
- Time zone: UTC−4 (VET)
- Postal code: 1030
- Area codes: 0243, 0244
- Climate: Cwb
- Website: www.coloniatovar.net

Colonia Tovar (Tovar Colony) is a mountain town of Venezuela, capital of the municipality Tovar in Aragua state. It is located about 65.5 km (41 mi) west of Caracas. It was founded on April 8, 1843, by a group of 390 immigrants from the then independent state of the Grand Duchy of Baden (later incorporated into Germany). It is characterized by the cultural imprint of its origin, so it is called "the Germany of the Caribbean". The economy depends primarily on agriculture and tourism. Colonia Tovar is known for its temperate crops (peaches, strawberries, beets, cauliflower, carrots, cabbage, chard, broccoli, lettuce, onions and potatoes) and their derivatives. Since 1990 it has experienced high population growth, rising from 3,373 to 21,000 inhabitants in 2016.

== History ==
A colonizing company was formed, composed of colonel Agostino Codazzi and Ramón Díaz, and as guarantor Martín Tovar y Ponte (the Count of Tovar). Codazzi contacted residents of the Kaiserstuhl region in the Grand Duchy of Baden and selected an area for the colony, choosing a site with geographic and climatic similarities to the German region that should provide the majority of settlers in Colonia Tovar. The land belonged to the nephew of Count of Tovar, Manuel Felipe Tovar, who donated it for the creation of the colony.

On October 14, 1841, the territory was founded as Palmar del Tuy and construction of infrastructure was begun. Once completed, the colonizing company went to the town of Endingen in Kaiserstuhl to select settlers. Contracts between the company and immigrants were signed at the inn Der Pfauen, a few meters from the entrance to the city. According to Alexander Benitz, the immigrants who embarked the Havre ship to Venezuela numbered 389: 239 men and 150 women, most from Kaiserstuhl. They departed for Venezuela on December 18, 1842.

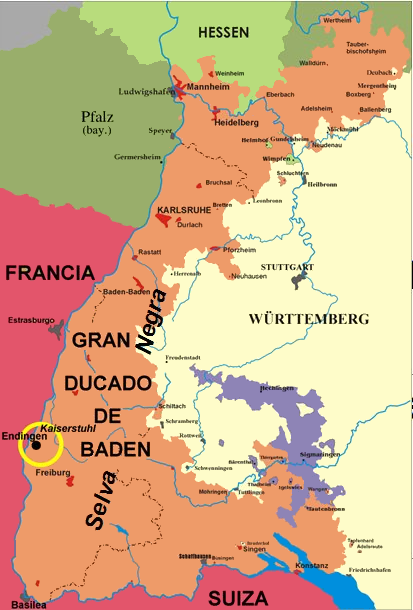
The Grand Duchy of Baden, in the west of present-day Germany, was an independent state until 1871, when it joined the German Empire. In the southwest corner is Kaiserstuhl and Endingen, from where the immigrant founders of Colonia Tovar came.

They travelled along the Rhine, embarked at the port of Le Havre (France) on January 19, 1843, and arrived at the La Guaira on 4 March aboard the French ship Clemence piloted by Captain Malverin. The ship was scheduled to land on the Puerto Maya coast, north of La Victoria, but given that no previous journeys had followed the path mapped by Codazzi, the ship was forced to turn to Choroní on an alternate path. This path was also designed by Codazzi and opened by engineer Inder Pellegrini, leaving La Victoria to the place assigned for the new population. However, they could not disembark immediately in Choroní because of a smallpox epidemic on board. The passengers and crew quarantined in Choroní from March 13.

On March 31, they headed to the city of Maracay and La Victoria where they were received by President of Venezuela Carlos Soublette. Settlers arrived in Palmar del Tuy on April 8, 1843, 112 days after leaving Baden. That day is considered the foundation day of Colonia Tovar, which took the last name of the donor. The first residents included scientists, naturalists, writers and painters, such as Carl Ferdinand Appun, Hermann Karsten, Karl Moritz, Friedrich Gerstäcker, Anton Goering, Augustus Fendler, Ferdinand Bellermann (a painter who was sponsored by Humboldt), some buried in the city cemetery.

Initially, the village was organized around the production of coffee. As "los colonieros" were thriving, production spread to new lands and activities such as growing vegetables and fruits, sent to markets in Caracas or La Victoria. The manufacture of barrels became another income source.

For many years the colony was connected with Caracas by a river. The difficulty of communication, isolation and the environmental setting so different from the mountains of Germany kept the people relatively isolated, with slow or even negative population growth, due to rural exodus.

That trend reversed in the 1960s, when Colonia Tovar took up tourism, which led to significant economic development and population growth. It became one of the richest towns in the country measured by population and one of the highest in terms of quality of life.

The descendants of early settlers fully integrated into the country and the town natively speaks Spanish, although German fluency is common.

== Geography ==
Colonia Tovar is located between 1,600 and 2,200 meters above sea level, in the central part of the Venezuelan Coastal Range. It is connected with Caracas and La Victoria by road. The city features a monsoon subtropical highland climate (Köppen: Cwb), with a daily temperature range of about 8 °C (14.4 °F), with a mean of 16.8 °C (62.2 °F), and frequent mists, especially at dawn and evening.

Climate data for Colonia Tovar, Venezuela (1991-2020)
Month	Jan	Feb	Mar	Apr	May	Jun	Jul	Aug	Sep	Oct	Nov	Dec	Year
Record high °C (°F)	29.5 (85.1)	25.6 (78.1)	26.7 (80.1)	27.3 (81.1)	29.0 (84.2)	25.8 (78.4)	25.5 (77.9)	26.2 (79.2)	26.7 (80.1)	26.2 (79.2)	24.7 (76.5)	25.8 (78.4)	29.5 (85.1)
Mean daily maximum °C (°F)	20.9 (69.6)	21.4 (70.5)	22.0 (71.6)	22.5 (72.5)	22.5 (72.5)	21.7 (71.1)	21.3 (70.3)	21.4 (70.5)	21.9 (71.4)	21.7 (71.1)	21.4 (70.5)	20.9 (69.6)	21.6 (70.9)
Daily mean °C (°F)	16.3 (61.3)	16.9 (62.4)	17.3 (63.1)	18.2 (64.8)	18.4 (65.1)	17.7 (63.9)	17.2 (63.0)	17.4 (63.3)	17.8 (64.0)	17.7 (63.9)	17.4 (63.3)	16.6 (61.9)	17.4 (63.3)
Mean daily minimum °C (°F)	10.9 (51.6)	11.1 (52.0)	11.8 (53.2)	13.4 (56.1)	14.6 (58.3)	14.1 (57.4)	13.6 (56.5)	13.9 (57.0)	14.4 (57.9)	14.1 (57.4)	13.6 (56.5)	12.1 (53.8)	13.1 (55.6)
Record low °C (°F)	6.8 (44.2)	6.7 (44.1)	4.2 (39.6)	8.9 (48.0)	9.2 (48.6)	10.9 (51.6)	7.1 (44.8)	8.2 (46.8)	9.8 (49.6)	9.4 (48.9)	9.1 (48.4)	6.5 (43.7)	4.2 (39.6)
Average precipitation mm (inches)	64.7 (2.55)	30.5 (1.20)	10.2 (0.40)	9.3 (0.37)	29.3 (1.15)	114.1 (4.49)	142.6 (5.61)	152.3 (6.00)	140.1 (5.52)	138.3 (5.44)	130.6 (5.14)	29.4 (1.16)	991.4 (39.03)
Average precipitation days (≥ 1 mm)	5.3	3.4	2.7	8.0	9.8	16.5	15.3	16.0	18.1	13.8	15.5	7.1	131.5
Source: NOAA

The city is located in northern Aragua state. The municipality has the shape of the letter "L". It is bounded on the north by the Caribbean Sea, the northeast by the state of Vargas, in the east by Caracas (Libertador municipality) in the south by the Aragua River and to the east ends by the Santiago Mariño Municipality. Colonia Tovar sits on rugged terrain with creeks and streams. Misty mountain landscapes are characteristic of the Venezuelan Coastal Range (running along the Venezuelan coast). Codazzi peak (2,429 meters) is north of the town. The cloud forest characterizes the dominant vegetation but changes to gallery forest at lower altitudes before ending with savanna weeds southward and xerophytics in the north.

The colony is surrounded by houses (chalets) relatively far apart in many small plots of intensive use. It develops an intensive agriculture: flowers, strawberries, tomatoes, peaches, garlic, peaches and other temperate crops. Ceramic craft workshops, sausage factories, cookies and candy, breweries, canned foods (jams, peaches, etc..) are present.

=== Hydrography, flora and fauna ===
The hydrography is divided into three basins: the Caribbean Sea, fed by the: San Miguel, Ocumare, Cata, Aroa and Tuy rivers; the Orinoco River, fed by the Memo and Guárico rivers; and the endorheic Lake Valencia, fed by the Aragua, Turmero, Maracay, Tapa-tapa, Tocorón, and Las Minas rivers. The River Aragua, southern boundary of the Colonia Tovar, was formed by the confluence of the Gabante and Curtidor rivers, above Pie de Cerro, north of La Victoria. The Gabante river is a tributary to Quebrada Honda, while Curtidor river converges with the San Carlos and Quebrada Coche rivers. All these rivers and streams originate in the high mountains surrounding Colonia Tovar. The headwaters of the Tuy River are near the town.

The city is located in a catchment area of the river, which forms a kind of amphitheater. Colonia is located within Codazzi Peak Natural Monument and near Henri Pittier National Park. In addition to its diverse climate zones and flora.

The diverse flora includes mostly epiphytes such as orchids, bromeliads and a variety of tree ferns.

Colonia has diverse wildlife, mainly birds, totaling 578 registered species. Mammals and snakes contribute to this diversity.

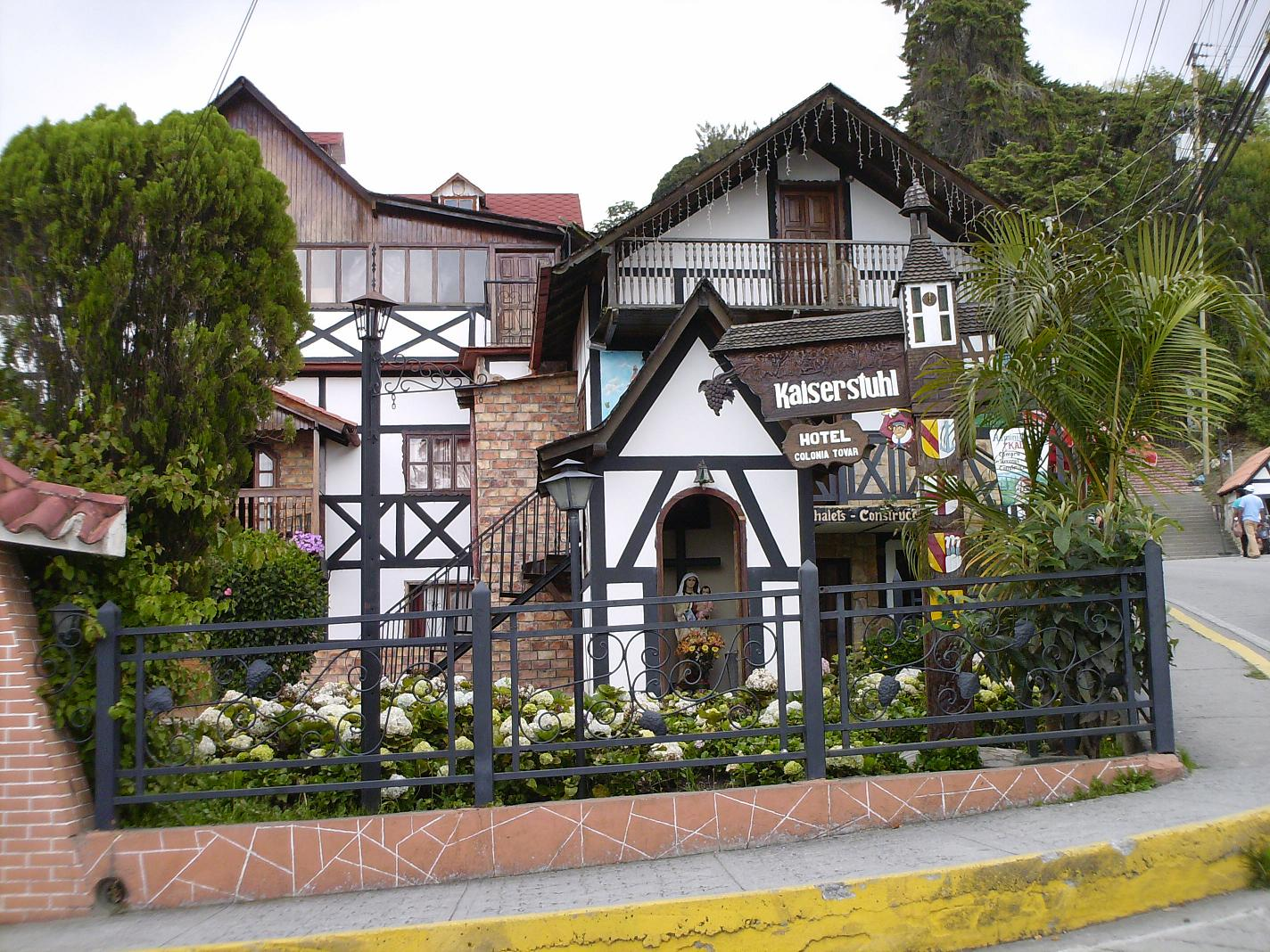
View of a house in Colonia Tovar.

The local fauna is characteristic of cloud forests; a habitat for many endemic species due to its unique climate and peatland environment. Among the wildlife present, species most commonly referred to are the classic golden-headed quetzal and the toucan beak emerald bottle, also known as "tiátaro." Coludo blue hummingbirds and tiles swallows are present. Among the most common primates is the black howler. Also common are the Tara butterfly, the mountaineer armadillo and many more. A frog is named after this area, the El Tovar Glass Frog (Celsiella revocata), that lives in the cloud forests of this region.

The Estación Biológica de Rancho Grande hosts a zoological museum that showcases area species. It has facilities and equipment such as magnifying glasses, water, trays and measurement instruments.

== Economy ==
Agriculture allowed the los colonieros to spread around the valley. Fruits and vegetables from there are sold throughout the country, especially in Caracas, Valencia, Maracay and La Victoria. Farmers and crafters set up markets with stalls that include red roofs. Colonia Tovar produces wooden casks. Los colonieros produce other crops and goods originating in German culture, such as peaches, tree tomato, passion fruit, strawberries, blackberries, figs, vegetables, bread, sausages, pastry, sauces and pasta, beer, wood, ceramics, wrought iron and crafts. With the influx of tourism from the 1960s, cottages were converted to hotels, restaurants were built into traditional huts. Tourism, mainly from Caracas, Valencia and Maracay has been replacing agriculture as the main economic activity.

== Language and culture ==
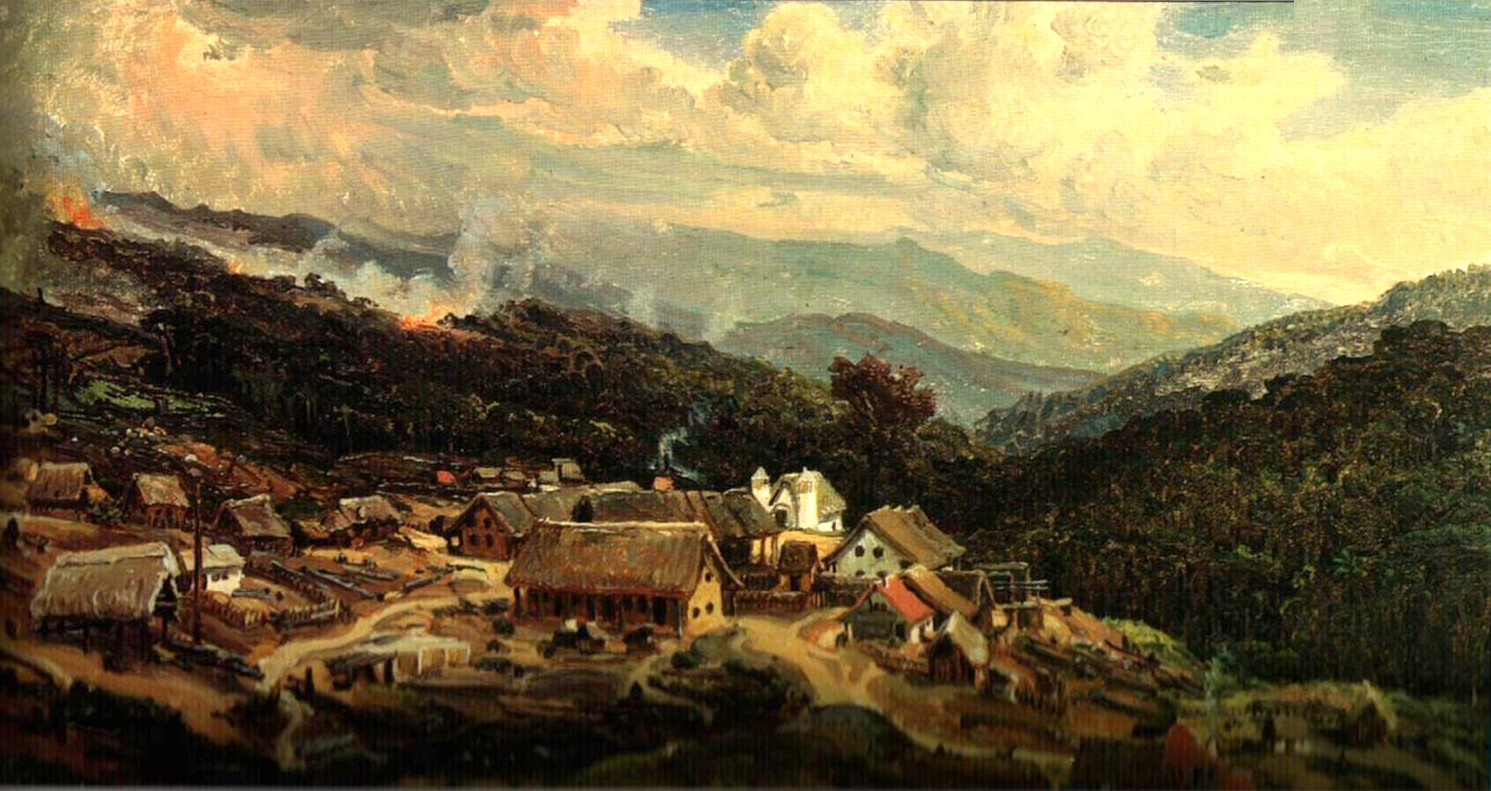
Ferdinand Bellermann. Colonia Tovar (1844)

Colonia Tovar operated as a closed community. The founders intended to maintain their cultural traditions. Upon arrival, they built houses reflecting the distinctive architecture of Kaiserstuhl. The Baden dialect (Badisches Dialekt) dominated the area and food and clothing remained traditional. For a time marriage outside the colonia was forbidden in order to ensure ethnic and cultural continuity.

Although the official language of Venezuela is Spanish, some people in Colonia Tovar speak alemannisch: Alemannic, Alemán Coloniero precisely. It is a variant language that was inherited from previous generations, although many phonetic and lexical motifs are no longer used in Europe. Moreover, the Alemán Coloniero has a strong influence of Spanish words with an ending in Alemán Coloniero. Many words came about after the Colonia Tovar was created, because of minimal communication with Germany. Most descendants of German settlers in Colonia Tovar now mostly speak Standard German.

The houses, buildings, and shops are made according to the Kaiserstuhl style, giving Colonia Tovar an unmistakable peculiar identity. The Church of St. Martin de Tours in the center of town is a copy of the Endingen in Germany, origin of most of the founders.

In 1940, Spanish was established as the official language and exogamous marriage became a free practice. In the early 21st century, the inhabitants started to integrate into Venezuelan culture, without abandoning their customs. Among the traditions that remain is craftsmanship in wood, ceramic and other materials. The Academic Center of Violin is a local school that prepares students in the art of manufacturing, maintenance and repair of symphonic instruments.

== Gastronomy ==
The cuisine is conditioned by its German origin. Popular desserts include strudels, gugelhupf, cakes and churros and/or strawberries with cream, the traditionals Kaiserschmarrn, Germknödel, Apfelstrudel and Schwarzwälder Kirschtorte, known in English as Black Forest cake, along with charcuterie and specialties including the famous German sausages. Also characteristic is the local beer.

== Dances and celebrations ==
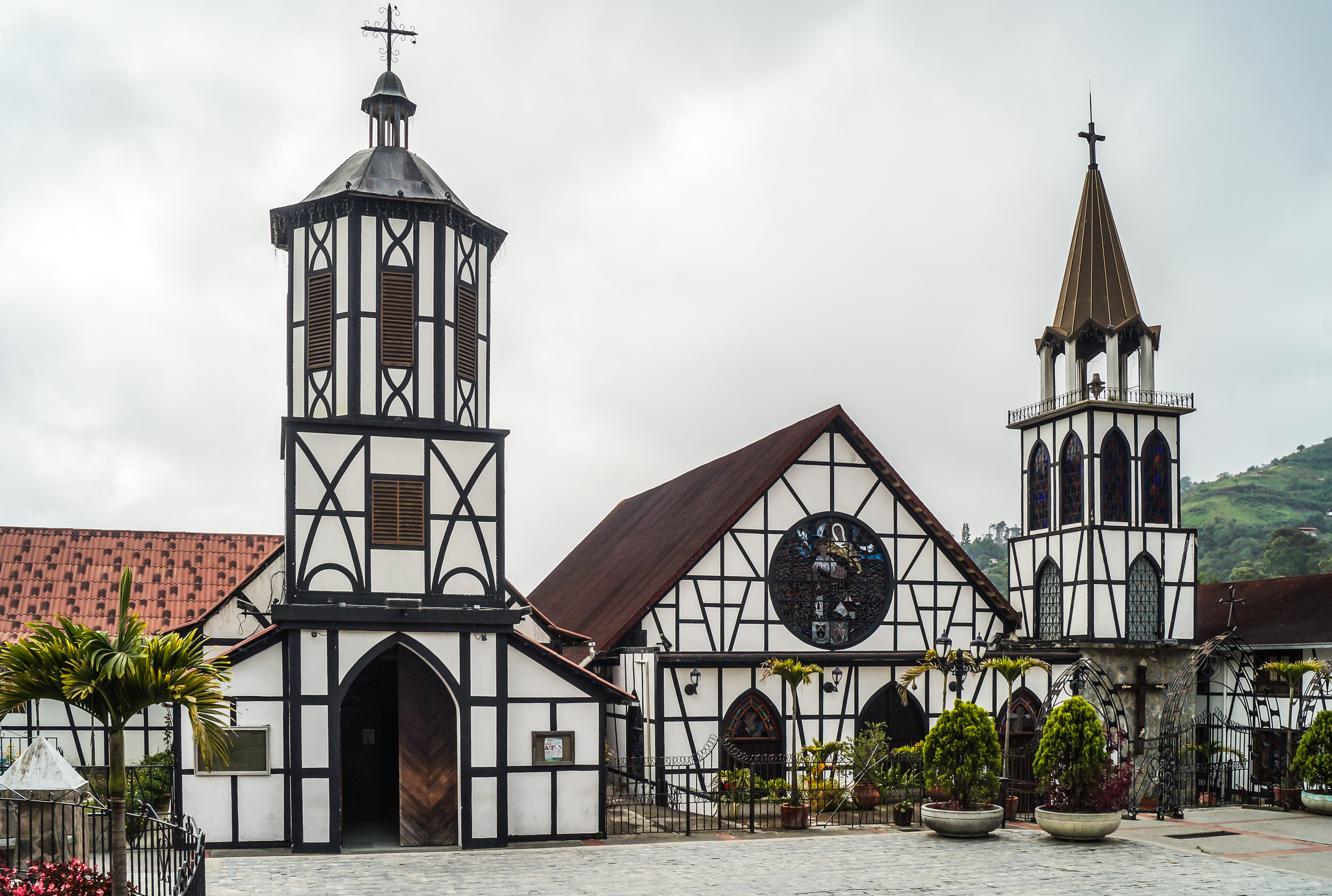
The Church San Martin de Tours was based in the church of Endingen in Germany.

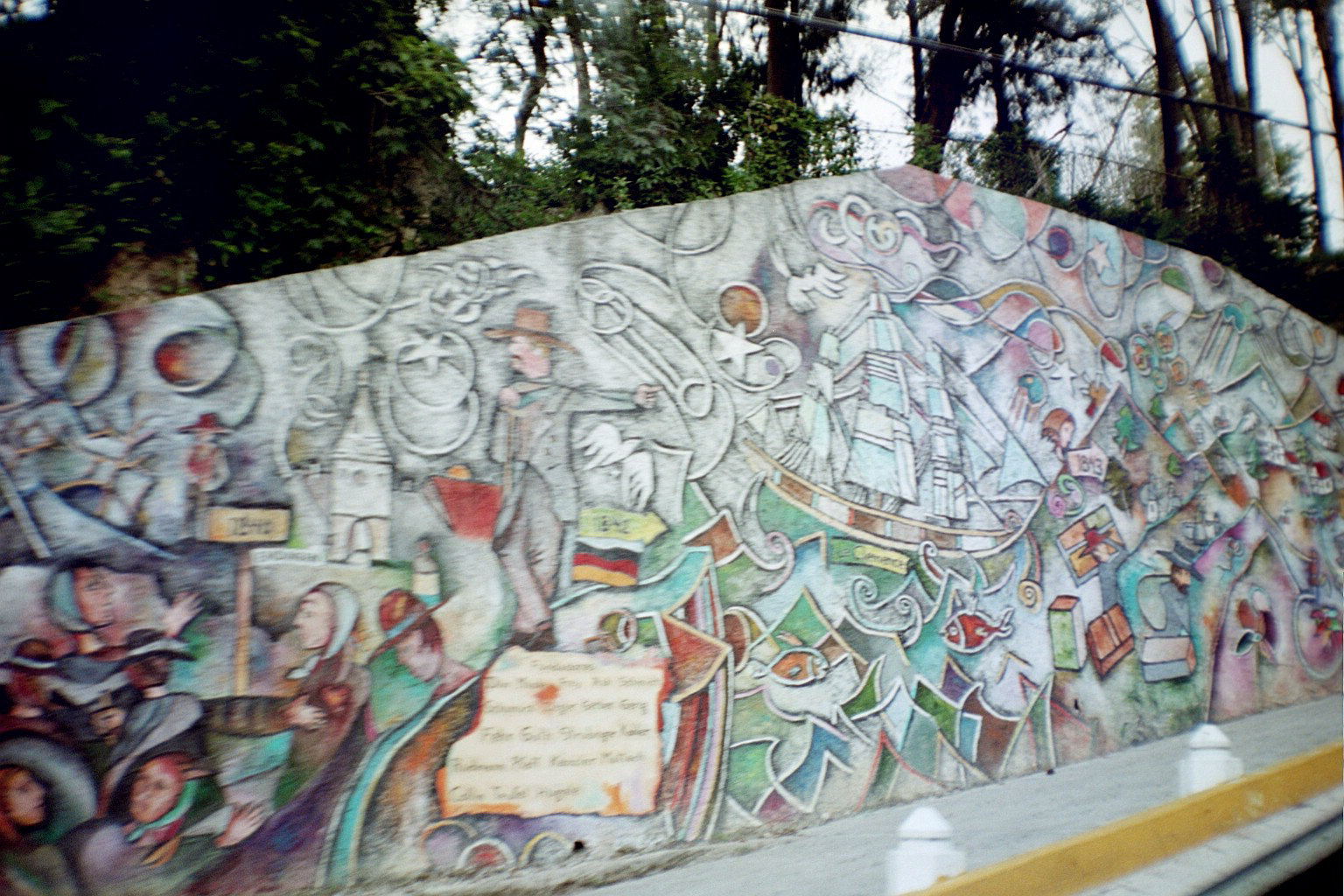
Mural representative of Colonia Tovar.

Oktoberfest is held annually in October. On occasion, groups from Germany were invited to play traditional music. The International Festival of Chamber Music also takes place.

April 8 is celebrated as the Colonia's founding date. Cultural activities in the Plaza Bolívar include a parade involving educational activities, dance groups, and cultural exchanges between locals and guests. The annual election of the Queen of Colonia Tovar is then.

Carnival parades include Jokilis and Gorilas. The Jokili is a character that appeared in Germany in 1782, a mixture of jester and harlequin. Their dress consists of a red suit with a fringed collar, sleeves, waist and legs, which reveal bells. They sport a three-pointed hat, white gloves and pointed shoes. They have a wooden mask, custom made for each Jokili. A carved wooden stick, which carries a knotted rope and a pig's bladder, a globe, is the instrument that usually hits bystanders.

St. Martin of Tours, the patron saint of travelers, is honored on 11 November. The church has an image of the saint, brought by the founders from Baden. On the same day is the Festival of Flowers, Fruits, and Crafts, in which prizes are awarded to the best products.

Two music festivals are held annually, one between March and April, and the other between August and September. One celebrates cultural heritage, held since 1992 and known as the International Festival of Chamber Music Colonia Tovar. The second is the Friends of Chamber Music Colonia Tovar, which has been held since 1997.

Along with the religious celebrations of Easter, in Colonia Tovar the traditional German "nests" take place, to celebrate the coming of Easter bunnies and eggs. It usually involves whole families, and it is customary for the children look for hidden eggs. The following Monday, the residents attend the Chapel of the Resurrection. A blessing of crops and food is given.

== Attractions ==
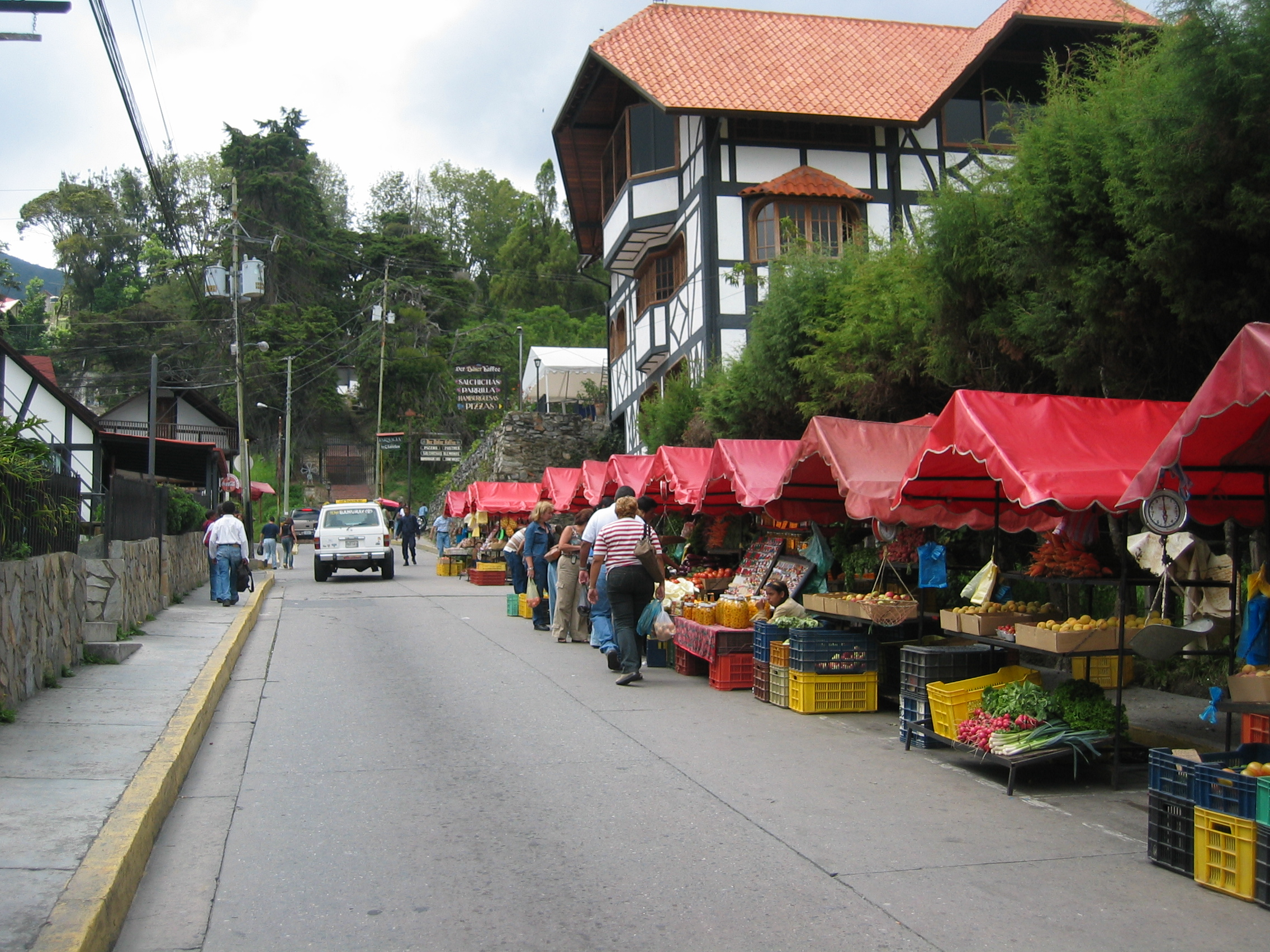
View of a sale of fruits and vegetables in Colonia Tovar.

The City Museum offers history, customs, and traditions of the Germanic people.

Breikanz Mall is a series of shops offering crafts particular to Germany and typical of the region. Its restaurants offer steaks, embutidos (cold meats or cured meats like sausage, bologna and salami), and Vienna sausages.

Codazzi Peak reaches 2,429 m high in Aragua. It covers 11,850 sq m, shared by the states of Vargas, Miranda and the Capital District. It was declared a national monument on June 5, 1991, in honor of Italian geographer/cartographer Agostino Codazzi (1793-1859). The Panarigua Archaeological Museum and Panarigua Inn are there.

Tovar Brewery was the first Venezuelan beer made in Colonia Tovar in 1843, arrived with its founders. Production methods have remained unchanged. It is produced by Cervecería Tovar C. A., and observes the quality standards defined in the Bavarian Purity Law of 1516.

Several buildings in the city center and around the Plaza Bolivar form the historical town's center. The most representative buildings are the Church of St. Martin of Tours, the Casa Codazzi, and the Old School. Many restaurants, cafes, craft shops are present.

Also located in the city center, Anno Domine Museum holds equipment belonging to the first settlers, documents, and paintings belonging to Baroness Elizabeth von Seller.

== Media ==
- KAY Radio

== International relations ==
=== Twin towns – Sister cities ===
Colonia Tovar is twinned with:

Pozuzo, Oxapampa Province, Peru; (United States) Helen, Georgia; Blumenau, Santa Catarina, Brazil; (Germany) Endingen am Kaiserstuhl, Baden-Württemberg; Maracay, Aragua, Venezuela	Nairobi, Kenya; (Germany) Passau, Bavaria; Veliko Tarnovo, Bulgaria; Altagracia de Orituco, Guárico, Venezuela; Tovar, Mérida, Venezuela

== Gallery ==
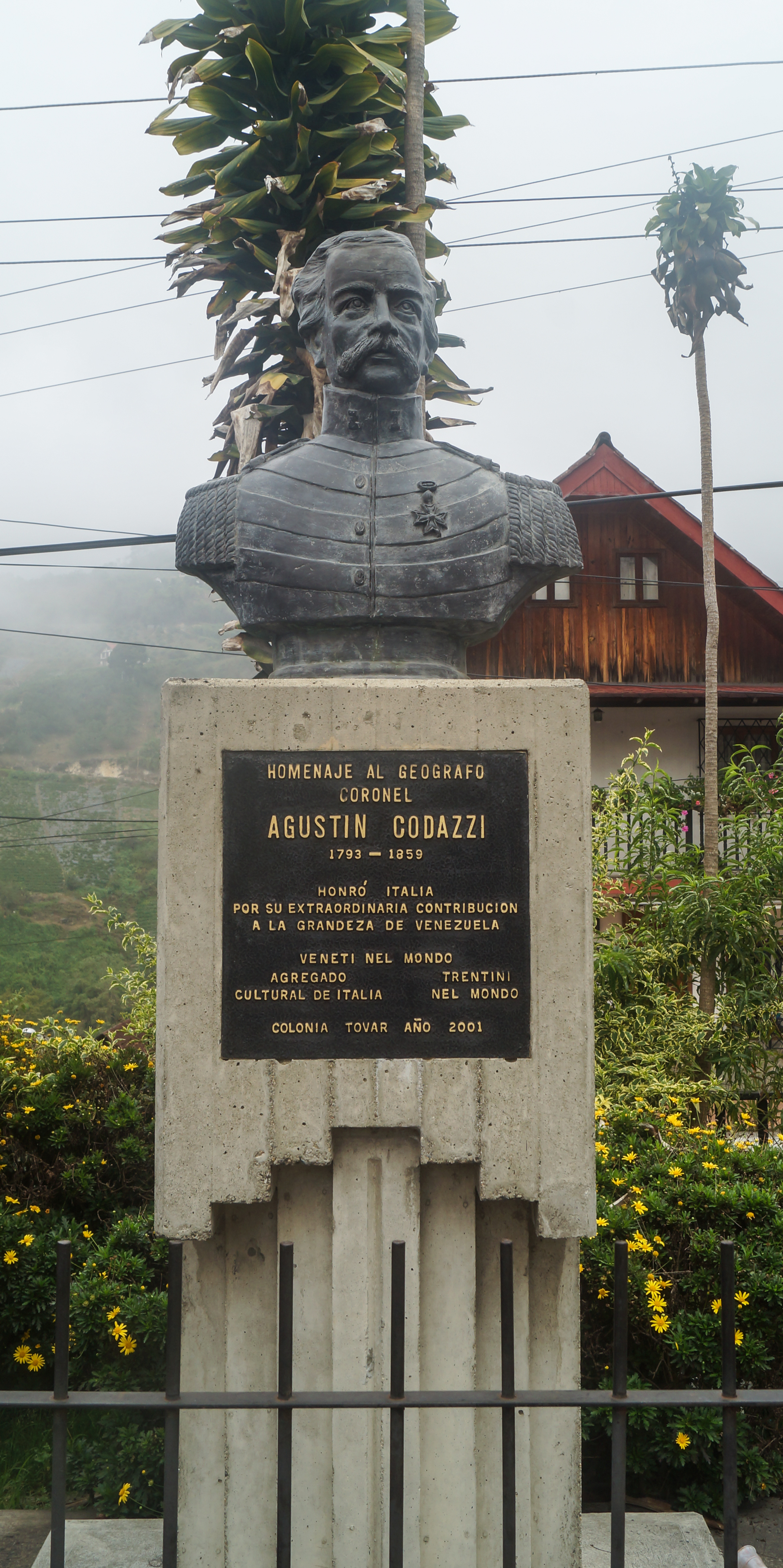
Agostino Codazzi monument in Colonia Tovar

== See also ==
- German colonization of the Americas
- German interest in the Caribbean
- German diaspora
