= Onai Quiñonez =

Venezuelan painter and cellist

- Born: 1993; Tovar, Mérida, Venezuela
- Died: 2026 (aged 32)
- Education: University of the Andes

Onai Quiñonez Tolosa (1993–June 2026) was a Venezuelan painter and cellist.

== Early and personal life ==
Quiñonez was born in Tovar, Mérida in 1993. He studied cello at the Cátedra Latinoamericana de Violonchelo and he attended the University of the Andes, graduating in 2019 with a degree in Visual Arts.

As of 2024, he lived in Santa Cruz de Mora.

On 24 June 2026, Quiñonez was reported missing following the Venezuelan earthquakes. His family reported he was in the rubble of a residential building in Caraballeda, La Guaira. El Nacional and Hyperallergic reported on his death on 1 July. He was 32 years old. His wife, fellow artist Laura Silva, survived the earthquakes and led the attempted rescue of Quiñonez.

== Career ==
=== Music ===
Between 2005 and 2012, Quiñonez was a member of the Sistema Nacional de Orquestas de Venezuela.

=== Art ===
Quiñonez's painting style has been described as expressionist and dynamic.

In a series spanning over a decade, Quiñonez painted meat to explore empathy, relationship and encounter, and human pain or suffering. This approach is inspired by the writings of French philosopher Maurice Merleau-Ponty.

==== Awards ====
- First prize in painting, 2022 ULA International Biennial of Contemporary Art
- Special mention, 2022 Luis Ángel Duque Contemporary Art Prize, for "1 (Potrero) x 1 (Vaca)"
- Main prize, 24th FIA Young Artists Salon (Andrés Bello Catholic University, Caracas, 2024) for "Res y todas las carnes"

== Exhibitions ==
=== Group exhibitions ===
- 1st National Salon of Visual Arts (Museo de Los Llanos, 2016)
- Latente, Galería ABRA and Carmen Araujo Arte (Hacienda La Trinidad, 2018)
- Descenso 130 (Galería Argos, 2023)
- Los del Espacio (Espacio Proyecto Libertad, 2024)
- Meninas eternas (Espacio Sánchez 2024)
- "Reses refrigeradas" and "Carne refrigerada" in Emergentes (Reset Gallery, 2025)
- 24th FIA Young Artists Salon
