= Patricia Poleo =

Venezuelan journalist

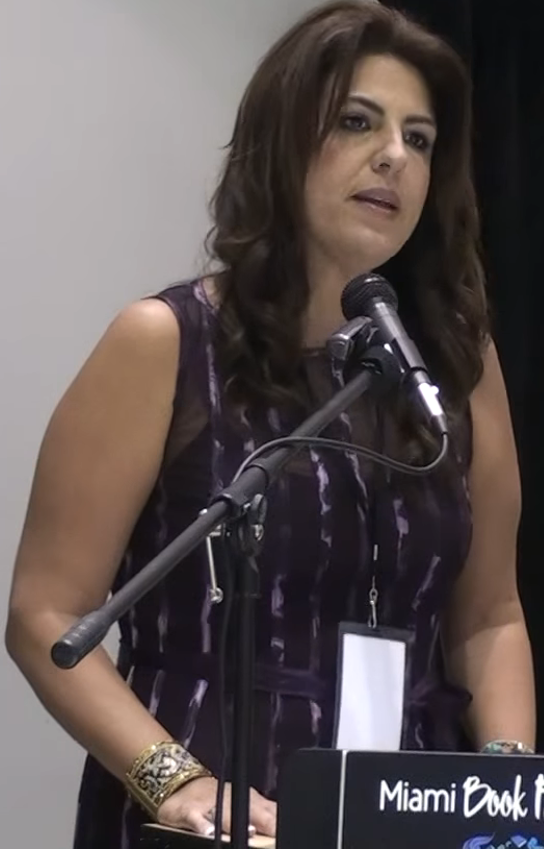
- Born: 8 November 1965 (age 60); Caracas, Venezuela
- Education: Andrés Bello Catholic University
- Children: Germania Poleo
- Parent: Rafael Poleo

Patricia Poleo (born 8 November 1965, Caracas) is a Venezuelan journalist and the winner of the King of Spain Journalism Award for her investigation into the whereabouts of Peruvian dictator Alberto Fujimori's right-hand man, Vladimiro Montesinos. She is the daughter of the journalist Rafael Poleo, wife of the former student leader Nixon Moreno, a political scientist graduated from the University of the Andes, and former director of her father's newspaper, El Nuevo País. She is known for her work and opposition to the current government in Venezuela.

== Career ==
Poleo graduated with a degree in Social Communication and specialization in advertising from the Andrés Bello Catholic University on 31 October 1987. She carried out a journalistic investigation of the Vladimiro Montesinos case, involved in crimes against humanity during the administration of former Peruvian president Alberto Fujimori, forcing her to denounce on several occasions the whereabouts of the fugitive, ending up in the capture of Montesinos. In this investigation, Patricia Poleo denounced that Montesinos was offered protection by security forces linked to the government of President Hugo Chávez during the time he remained hidden in Venezuelan territory. In her book Tras las huellas de Montesinos (Behind the traces of Montesinos), Poleo denounced personal attacks and harassment that attempted to keep her from her investigation. Her work earned her the Rey Juan Carlos Prize for Journalism.

During the investigation of Prosecutor Danilo Anderson, in August 2005, the Venezuelan authorities detained a suspect that claimed that he collected 12 kg of C4 plastic explosive in Panama and transported it to Venezuela. On the basis the testimony, warrants were issued for the arrest of Patricia Poleo, banker Nelson Mezerhane, retired general Eugenio Áñez Núñez and Salvador Romaní, as the "intellectual authors" of the assassination. Human rights groups, media advocates, and members of the opposition accused the Venezuelan government of turning the investigation of Anderson's murder into a political issue and using the case to harass government opponents. These groups stated that the accusations were an attempt to take away the freedom of the press. Mezzerane, Áñez, and Romaní turned themselves in and were granted bail in December 2005.

In August 2007, while Íngrid Betancourt was kidnapped, Patricia Poleo stated that Betancourt was being held in Venezuela and that her release was near. The Colombian government expressed doubts about this information through its minister of foreign affairs Fernando Araújo. Poleo also criticized Hugo Chávez for using this situation to improve relations with France after an impasse with the government of Jacques Chirac in which they refused to sell arms to Venezuela. A few days after Poleo's statements, President Chávez openly offered his services to negotiate between the FARC and the government in an effort to release those kidnapped, but denied knowing about the whereabouts of Betancourt.

=== Personal attack ===
On 31 January 2002, the headquarters of the journal Así es la noticia (This is the news) was attacked with an explosive tossed by two persons on a motorcycle, a day after she published a video about conversations between the Venezuelan Army and the Colombian guerrilla FARC along with the director of the newspaper, Ibéyise Pacheco, and journalists Marta Colomina, and Marianella Salazar. Two months later the Inter-American Court of Human Rights issued a protection measure for the group.

== See also ==
- Vladimiro Montesinos
- Murder of Danilo Anderson
