= Assassination of Danilo Anderson =

2004 murder in Caracas, Venezuela

The assassination of Danilo Anderson took place on 18 November 2004, in Caracas, Venezuela. Danilo Baltasar Anderson (born 29 October 1966) was a Venezuelan environmental state prosecutor investigating more than 400 people accused of crimes during the Llaguno Overpass events and the failed 2002 coup d'état attempt. He was assassinated by a car bomb on his way home from attending postgraduate classes at aged 38. In 2005 several people were convicted of masterminding the assassination, though the investigation had flaws and was marred with allegations of corruption.

== Background ==
Anderson was born in Caracas and was raised in the slums. In the 1990s, he was a student agitator participating in clashes with police weekly with fellow demonstrators. He graduated in law from Central University of Venezuela in 1995, specializing later in criminology and environmental law. He worked as a lawyer for several firms, and was a general tax inspector between 1993 and 2000. He was the first official to bring a case for environmental offenses in Caracas. Anderson described himself as being a radical leftist and was a supporter of Hugo Chávez. His murder shocked Venezuelan opinion across the political spectrum.

Danilo Anderson was a high-profile prosecutor that participated often in political trials. Following the failure of the coup in April 2002, he prosecuted the responsibles of the Llaguno Overpass events and those who signed the Carmona Decree. Many accused Anderson of extorting money from those he threatened to prosecute in order to have their charges dropped.

Leaders of the political movements opposed to President Chávez had also turned to economic means to achieve their political goals following the 2002 coup attempt. For two months from early December 2002 they organized the Venezuelan general strike of 2002-2003, dominated by the near-closure of Venezuelan state oil company PDVSA as a key oil transport route was blocked. The strike ultimately failed in its attempt to make President Chávez resign, but caused acute economic problems, with GDP falling by a quarter in early 2003, and deepened the conflictive political situation and polarization resulting from the Llaguno Overpass shootout and the April coup.

Following the collapse of the strike, opposition politicians focused on a recall referendum. Widespread international attention focused on the run-up to the 2004 Venezuelan recall referendum in August 2004. President Chávez won the vote with 59% of the total.

== Death ==
On 18 November 2004 at about 9:45 pm, Anderson was in Urbanización Los Chaguaramos in Caracas, driving home in his yellow Toyota Autana from the University Institute of Forensic Science where he was taking postgraduate classes. Anderson stopped at a street and as he accelerated, a military-grade C-4 plastic explosive device placed on the frame under the driver's seat detonated from a wireless device killing Anderson instantly. The blast had such force that it broke windows in the vicinity and covered the street with glass. Witnesses say they heard two loud explosions and saw the vehicle, already in flames, roll into the front of a nearby building. Firefighters and CICPC investigators arrived at the scene shortly after the explosion. Anderson's body was charred an unrecognizable and he had to be identified by his fingerprints and dental records. Anderson's sister and girlfriend also helped identify him as the victim by recognizing personal belongings such as his Glock automatic pistol, two cell phones, his girlfriend's photo, his wallet and a chain.

Within a few hours, many government officials had gathered at the scene and Attorney General Isaias Rodriguez began to mention Anderson's involvement in the investigation of those who signed the Carmona Decree. The Venezuelan government and opposition, multiple national organizations and international bodies such as the OAS and the IACHR condemned the assassination.

== Investigation ==
The investigation into who masterminded Anderson's murder became one of the most controversial topics in Venezuelan politics. According to the United States Department of State, Anderson's death was "believed to be linked to his alleged extortion attempts, but the BRV [Bolivarian Republic of Venezuela] claims his death was part of a larger plot to destabilize the government". There were reports that friends of Anderson may have operated an extortion racket aimed at opposition figures being investigated by Anderson in relation to the 2002 coup and that Anderson or lawyers close to him "were paid large bribes in a bid to ensure the acquittal of some civilians linked to the 2002 coup". Other reports claimed that Anderson was a member of an extortion ring himself and the members involved feared he was investigating them. Lifelong friend of Anderson and Caracas municipal council member, Carlos Herrera, stated "The Danilo I first knew was a revolutionary without a cent to his name" and stated that a few years before his death, Anderson did not even have a vehicle. Herrera explained that the Toyota Autana that Anderson was killed in was $70,000 and that he had recently purchased two personal water craft along with multiple apartments and farms.

Following the assassination, the Venezuelan government quickly blamed Venezuelan exiles in the United States for the murder. On 26 November 2004, two brothers Otoniel and Rolando Guevara were found by the National Guard wandering down a road in Valencia naked and tied after they had been seen earlier accompanied by about 10 armed individuals who had bound and gagged the brothers. Some reported that DISIP officers were the ones who had the Guevara brothers bound earlier and let them go so that they would be found and arrested legally, though the Venezuelan government denied such allegations. The two were arrested and both charged with homicide. The brothers stated that they were captured, drugged and then tortured before they were arrested. The same day the Guevara brothers were arrested two other suspects in the case, lawyer Antonio Lopez Castillo and, another former police agent, Juan Carlos Sanchez, were shot dead by investigating officers in separate incidents; both were said to have opened fire on the police, though relatives and lawyers stated that the two were executed by the police.

On 4 January 2005, Interior Minister Jesse Chacón stated that there was evidence of bribery and extortion linked to both Anderson and bankers that allegedly participated in the 2002 coup. A lawyer linked to Anderson, Sócrates Tiniacos, told police in an affidavit that he assisted Anderson's girlfriend and her brother with removing about $60,000 from Anderson's apartment safe following the assassination in order to cover up suspicious money from the police. Tiniacos also explained in his sworn statement that he saw two attorneys negotiating to keep a banker and coup suspect from being arrested and saw them give Anderson a bag full of U.S. dollars in a Caracas restaurant. Tiniacos said to police, "Danilo got into his car with the package and left. I don't know what he did with it". Later that month, Attorney General Isaías Rodríguez stated that police involved in the investigation "shuffled the pieces of the puzzle" to protect those suspected in Anderson's death and replaced the investigative team for a second time. Rodríguez called the extortion evidence "contradictory" saying "If we take away his medal and say Danilo was a crook, we are hurting Hugo Chávez."

The investigation eventually widened in search of the organizers and planners of the murder. By August 2005 the Venezuelan authorities had detained Giovani José Vásquez De Armas, a self-confessed former member of the Autodefensas Unidas de Colombia (AUC), the Colombian right-wing paramilitary organization. In sworn testimony given on August 29, 2005, Vásquez de Armas declared that he had participated in two meetings to plan attacks against members of the Venezuelan government. He alleged that participants in the second meeting decided to target Danilo Anderson. After that second meeting Vásquez de Armas said he collected 12 kg of C4 plastic explosive in Panama and transported it to Venezuela.

On the basis of Vásquez De Armas' testimony, warrants were issued for the arrest of leading journalist Patricia Poleo, banker Nelson Mezerhane, retired general Eugenio Áñez Núñez and Salvador Romaní, as the "intellectual authors" of the assassination. Mezzerane, Áñez and Romaní turned themselves in and were granted bail in December 2005. Poleo did not present herself to the authorities; she was interviewed on a TV show in Peru in January 2006. Human rights groups, media advocates and members of the opposition accused the Venezuelan government of turning the investigation of Anderson's murder into a political issue, using the case to harass government opponents. They stated that the accusations were an attempt to take away the freedom of the press.

On 20 December 2005, Otoniel and Rolando Guevara were sentenced to 27 years and 9 months imprisonment each, while their brother Juan Bautista was sentenced to the maximum 30 years.

=== Flaws ===
In 2006 the credibility of the key prosecution witness Vásquez De Armas came into question after it was shown he had a criminal record for identity fraud in his native Colombia and he was not a psychiatrist as he had pledged to be. Documentation of uncertain provenance was produced apparently showing that Vasquez de Armas was serving jail time in Santa Marta, Colombia, at the time he claims to have witnessed the planning of Anderson's murder by leading opposition figures. Venezuela's Attorney General Isaias Rodriguez moved to control press reporting on Vasquez de Armas while the case was sub-judice. The ban on discussing the personal life and alleged unreliability of Vásquez was lifted in August 2006. In August 2006, Isaias Rodríguez had to admit that Vasquez de Armes had actually lied. Armas also admitted to one journalist that the Venezuelan government "paid him to fabricate his testimony".

Isaías Rodríguez was accused by the opposition to turn Anderson's murder into a political witch hunt, using the case to harass government opponents.

== See also ==
- Llaguno Overpass events
