= Ferdinand Bellermann =

German painter

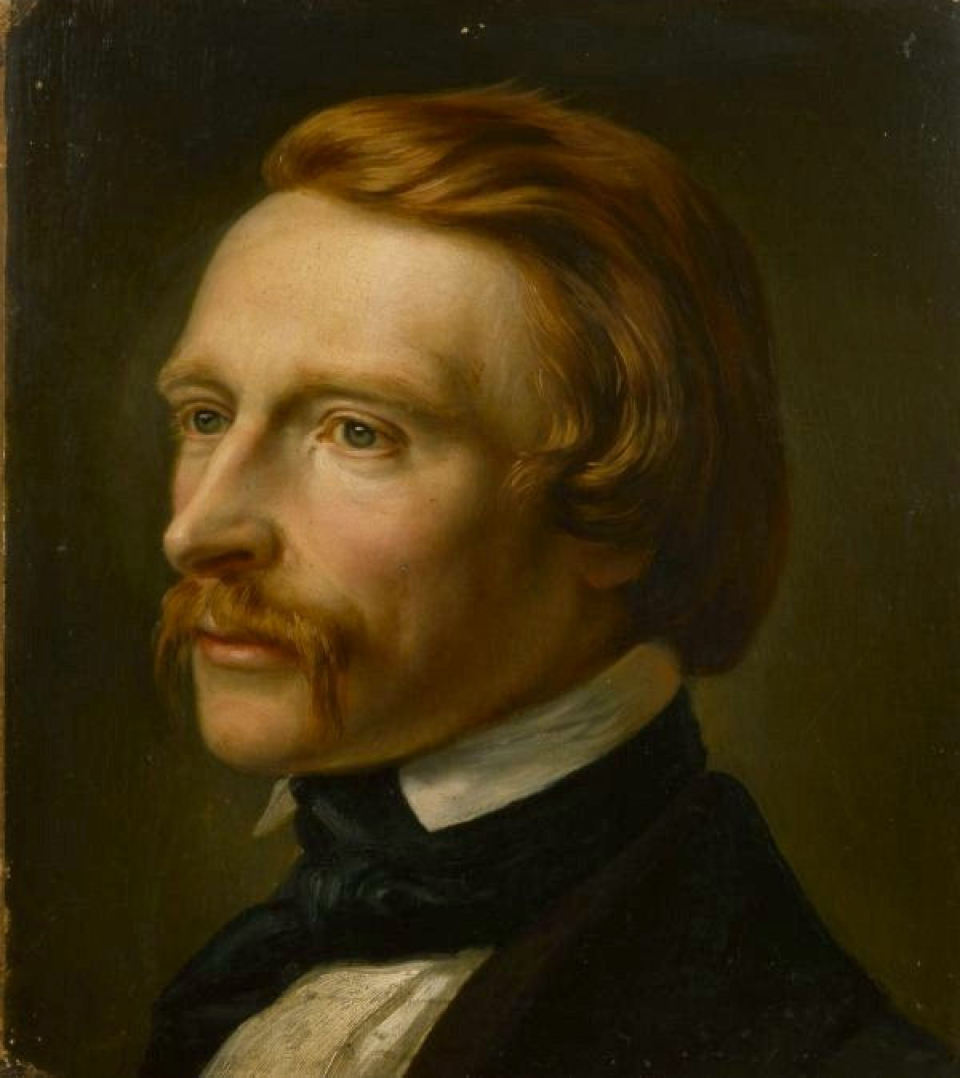
Ferdinand Bellermann. Portrait by Carl Steffeck (1850)

Ferdinand Konrad Bellermann (14 March 1814 – 11 August 1889) was a German painter and naturalist, who specialized in scenes of Venezuela.

== Biography ==
He was born in Erfurt. His father, a tanner, died prematurely, leaving the family in financial straits. As the eldest child, he was especially responsible for their care. Although they received help from his uncle Johann, a successful businessman, he took a job herding sheep.

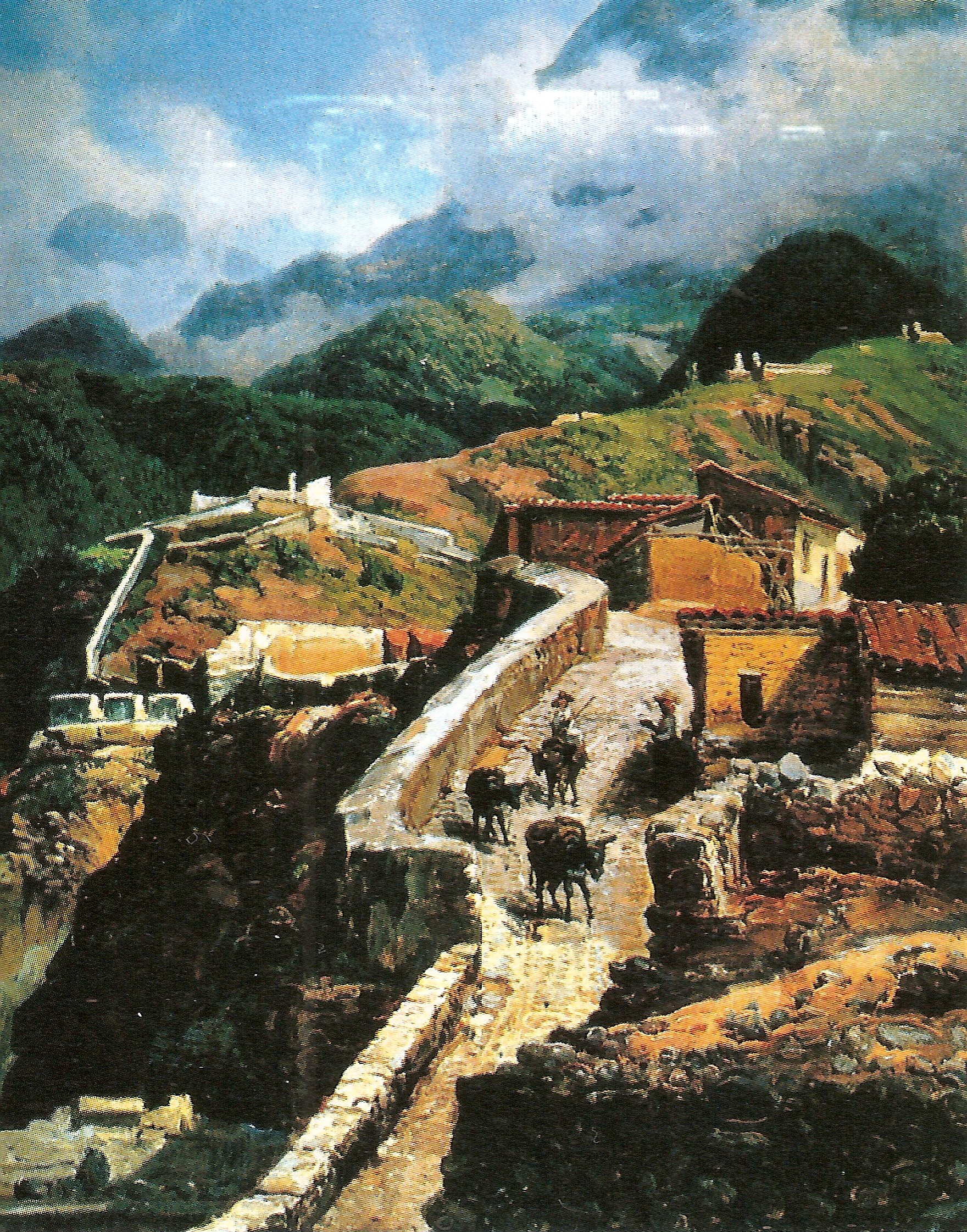
A Street in La Guaira

His talent was discovered, however and, in 1828, at the age of fourteen, he was able to attend the Weimar Princely Free Drawing School, where he studied to be a porcelain painter. The intention was that, upon graduating, he would work at the Volkstedt porcelain manufactory, which was owned by relatives. Apparently, however, he developed vision problems, so he returned to Erfurt and stayed there until 1833, when he went to study in Berlin with Wilhelm Schirmer and Carl Blechen. While there, he travelled extensively throughout Thuringia and visited Rügen to make sketches. During these excursions, he also developed an interest in botany and acquired considerable knowledge on the subject.

In 1840, he took a trip to Norway, via Belgium and the Netherlands, with Friedrich Preller (one of his teachers from Weimar) and two other students. It was a hazardous trip, over back roads with primitive accommodations but, on their return, he painted a large canvas that drew attention to his ability for accurately representing nature, including geological formations. It is currently lost, but was purchased by King Frederick William IV. That led to Bellermann being recommended by Alexander von Humboldt to accompany an expedition to South America, initiated by a merchant from Hamburg, to make scientifically accurate representations of the plants and landscapes.

He arrived in Venezuela in July 1842, and stayed until September 1845. The expedition began at the port of La Guaira, where he sketched the local inhabitants and the ruins that still remained from the 1812 Caracas earthquake. He toured most of the country, visiting sites suggested by Humboldt, amassing a huge collection of pastel, pen and pencil sketches as well as some oil paintings, depicting urban life and customs in addition to the landscapes. While there, he witnessed the return of Simón Bolívar's remains from Santa Marta in November 1842.

Bellermann arrived back in Germany in November 1845, but continued to paint canvases relating to Venezuela for the rest of his life. In 1849, he became a professor of drawing at the Prussian Academy of Arts, and then in 1866, took over the landscape painting professorship from his former teacher, Wilhelm Schirmer. During his tenure, he was an advocate for Humboldt's ideas regarding the potential use of tropical vegetation in Europe.

Bellermann died in Berlin in 1889. From October 2014 to January 2015, a major centennial retrospective of his work was held at the Angermuseum in Erfurt.

== Selected paintings ==
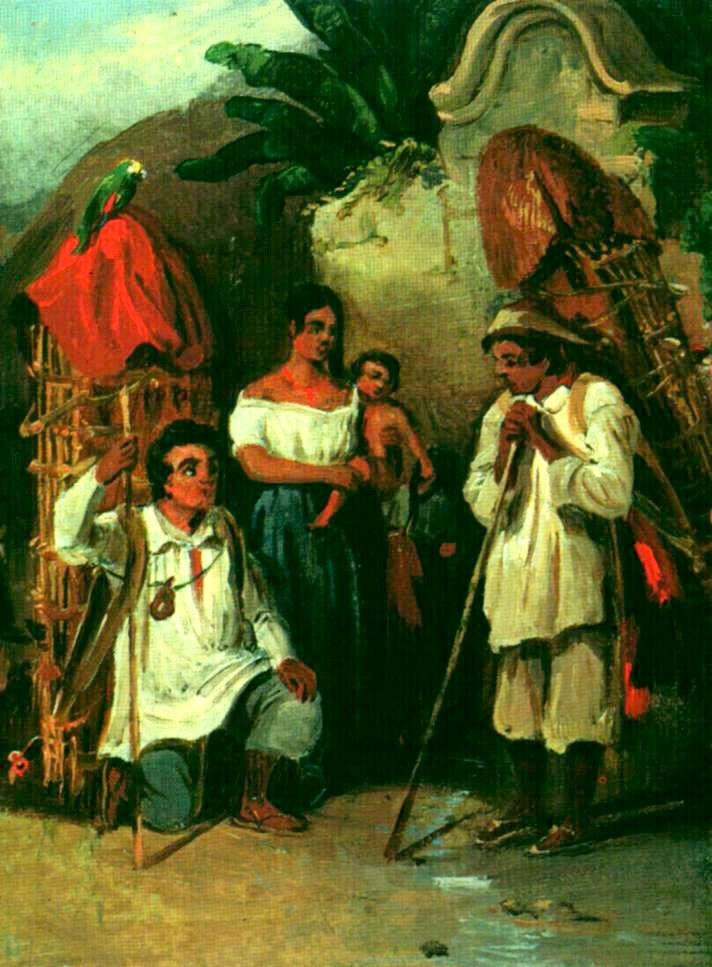
Rooster Salesman

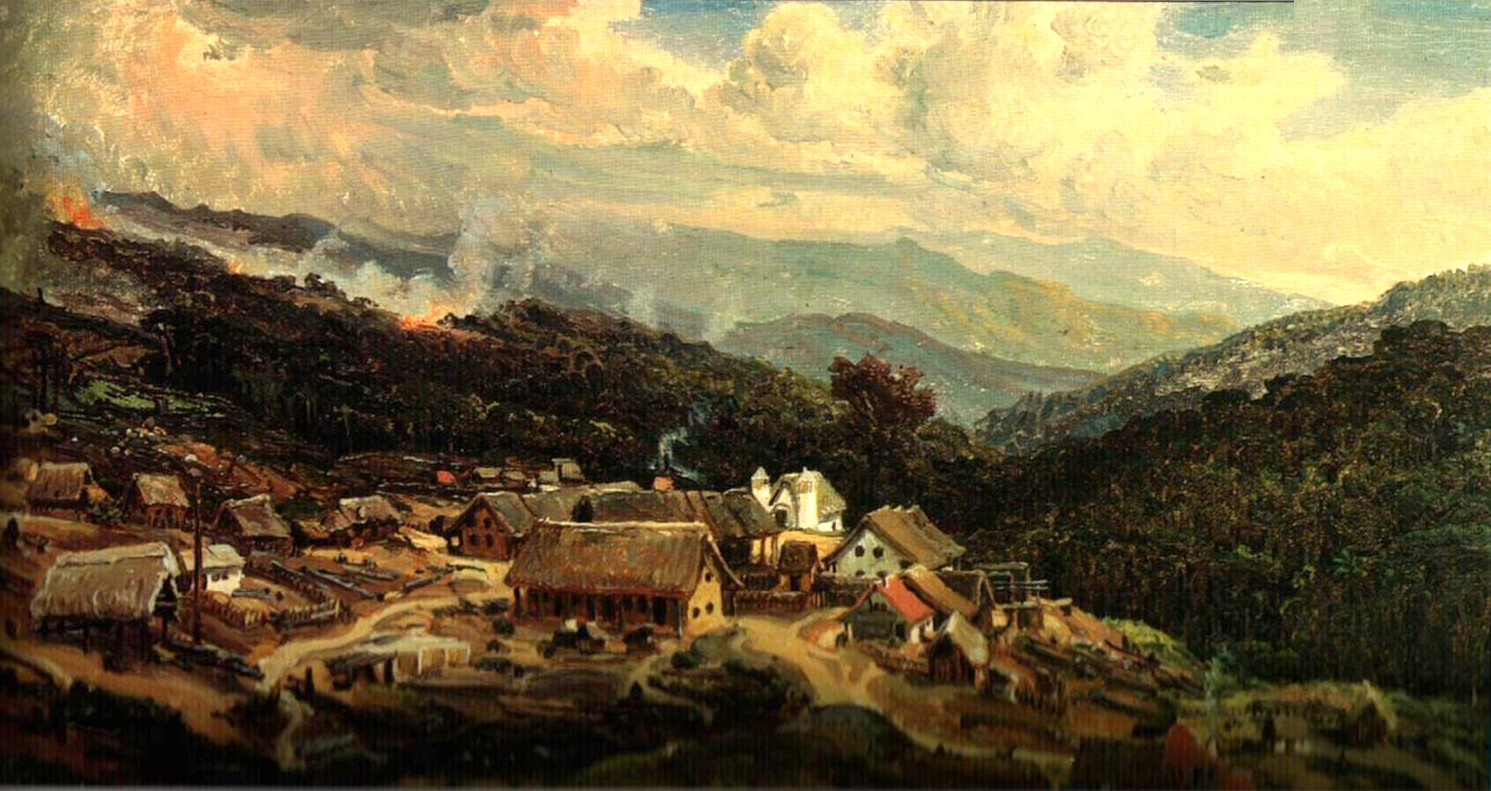
Colonia Tovar

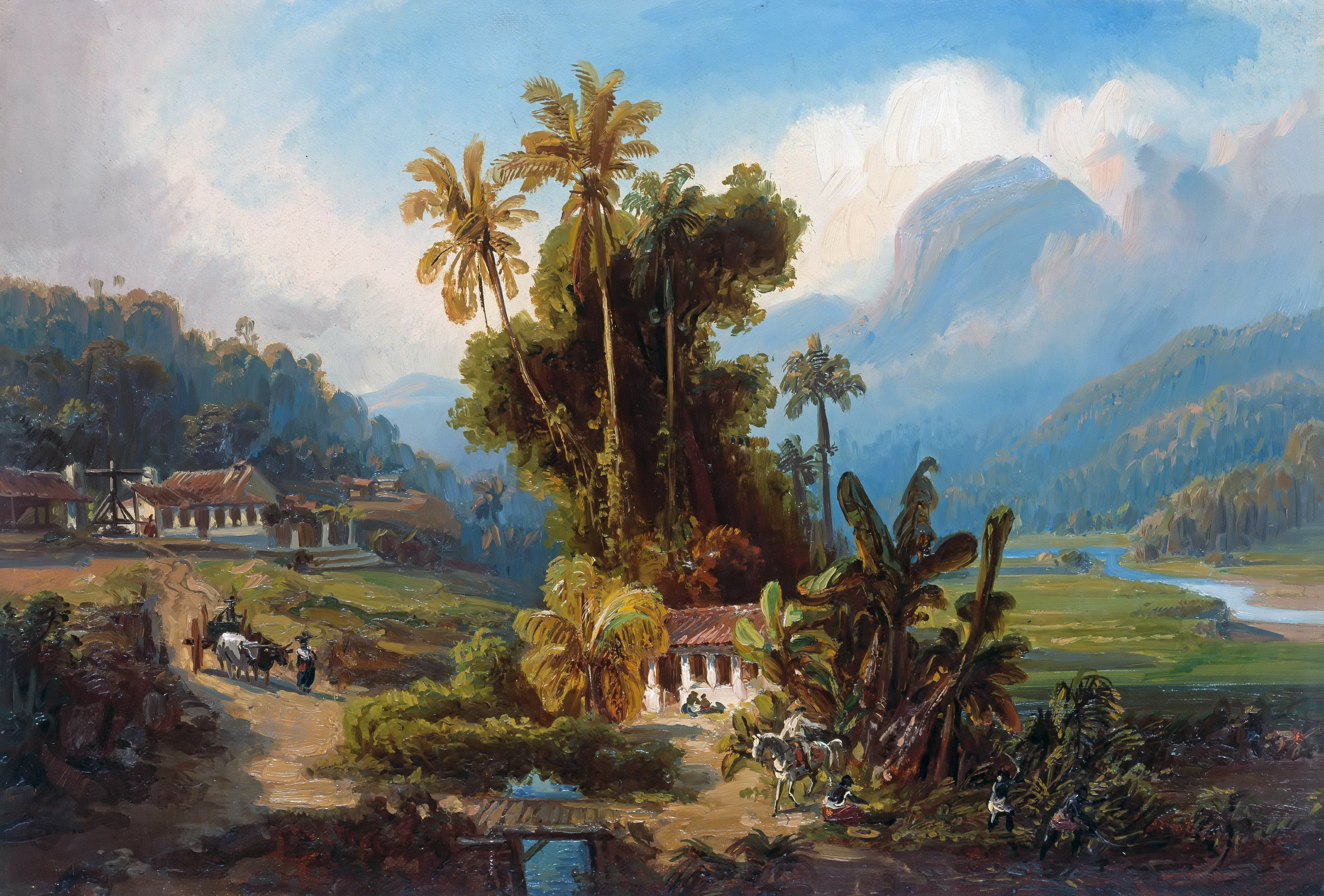
Sugar Plantation
near Puerto Cabello

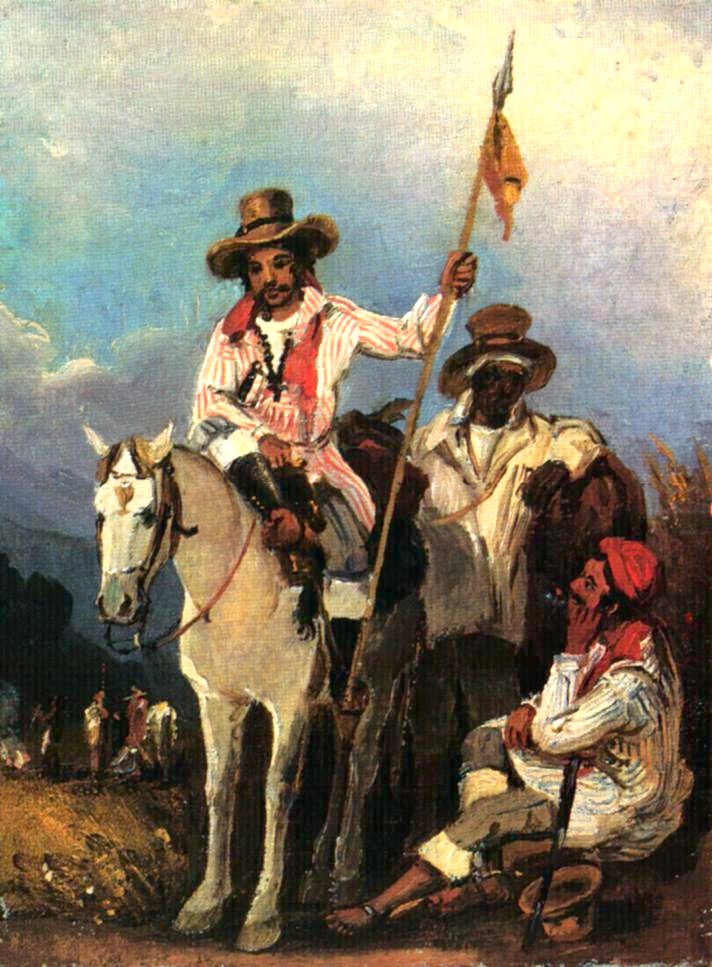
Cowboys
