= Marta Colomina =

Spanish-Venezuelan journalist and educator

- Born: 12 July 1938 (age 88); Barcelona, Spain
- Citizenship: Venezuelan
- Education: University of Zulia
- Occupation: Journalist

Marta Colomina Reyero (12 July 1938) is a Spanish-Venezuelan journalist and retired college professor. For two decades she taught journalism in her alma mater, the University of Zulia. During the 1980s she was president of the Venezuelan state television channel, Venezolana de Televisión, and held a column of opinion in the newspaper El Universal for almost twenty years. Since 2014, she has written for the newspaper El Nacional.

Colomina is recognized for her critical opinion of the political process that Hugo Chávez founded and was embroiled in several controversies with his government.

After her tenure as president of Venezolana de Televisión, she was publicly accused of improper handling of the channel's resources, statements that have not been proven before the justice.

== Biography ==
His father, Francisco Colomina, was a cabinet-maker who emigrated to Venezuela to work in the Caribbean Petroleum Company, later returned to Spain to serve on the Republican side in the Spanish Civil War. At that time he met Aurora Reyero, with whom he married. After a while they settled in Maracaibo, Zulia state in Venezuela. Marta's younger brother Francisco was born there.

Colomina married the poet Hesnor Rivero, of whom she later divorced. Together they had two daughters, Celalba and Marta Celina.

=== Education ===
She studied elementary school in Maracaibo and soon after high school in the Normal School, in Spain. Colomina also there studied in a school of nuns in Leon. In 1959 she returned to Venezuela and enrolled in the School of Journalism of the University of Zulia (LUZ), where she graduated in 1964 with a summa cum laude mention. During those years she was a teacher in the schools Nazaret and Siervas del Santísimo in Maracaibo. Later, Colomina specialized in Communication Research at Stanford University in California, and studied other postgraduate courses at the University of Barcelona and the University of Sorbonne.

=== Career ===
Colomina taught for more than two decades in LUZ. She was head of the Department of Research and Public Opinion, and later was director of the School of Social Communication. At the same time, she chaired the Venezuelan Association of Communication Researchers.

In 1986, on the recommendation of Simón Alberto Consalvi, President Jaime Lusinchi appointed her to the head of the state channel, Venezolana de Televisión, channel 8. She held that position until 1989. Later she was director of the newspaper El Nuevo País. From 1995 to 2014 she published an opinion column in the newspaper El Universal. In 1996 she started a morning program called 'La Entrevista' (The Interview) in Televen, which she held until 2005. He also held a two-hour radio program in the Unión Radio Circuit, from 1994 to 2011. According to human rights organizations, colleagues and Colomina itself, the cessation of its column, its radio and television programs, was due to pressures exerted by the government of Hugo Chávez to the executives of those companies.

Since 2014 she publishes his weekly column in the newspaper El Nacional.

=== Attacks against their integrity ===
On January 31, 2002, the headquarters of the daily newspaper Así es la noticia was attacked with an explosive launched by two people on a motorcycle. This happened a day after Ibéyise Pacheco, editor of the newspaper and Patricia Poleo, Marianella Salazar and Marta Colomina released a video of talks between the Venezuelan Army and the FARC's Colombian guerrilla. Two months later, the Inter-American Court of Human Rights (IACHR) issued a protective measure in favor of Colomina and the three other journalists.

On October 21, 2002, an explosive device was launched at the headquarters of Union Radio in Chacao, damaging an adjacent building. On June 21, 2003, an audio device was exploded with pamphlets containing messages against Colomina, a hundred meters from the radio station and just as the journalist's program was being transmitted.

Colomina was the victim of a molotov bomb attack on her car. The event was perpetrated by eight men with long firearms. The journalist left unscathed due to the bullet-proof material of the car's windshield. The IACHR reiterated the protection measures afterwards.

Following the neglect of the Venezuelan government to take measures to preserve life ordered by the Court, the mayor of Chacao, Leopoldo López assigned two municipal police escorts for her protection. On February 14, 2008 the assigned escorts were fired at, one of them shot dead.

Colomina has also been attacked and verbally threatened by government officials, their followers and President Chavez himself. Former Defense Minister General José Luis García Carneiro stated that the journalist should be deported from the country because of her dual nationality.

In 2003 several deputies of the National Assembly asked the Public Prosecutor's Office to open an investigation against her for the dissemination of information about looting in the city of Valencia. Deputy Iris Varela requested that her Venezuelan nationality to be revoked. Communication Minister William Izarra also responded in a haughty way to Colomina's coverage of these events.

On December 1, 2008 a tear-gas grenade was dropped on the building where Colomina resided.

In addition to the IACHR, several organizations such as Reporters Without Borders, the Human Rights Foundation and the Press and Society Institute have spoken out against verbal and physical attacks on the journalist.

== Works ==
- Colomina, Marta (1968) El huésped alienante: un estudio sobre audiencia y efectos de las radio-telenovelas en Venezuela. Universidad del Zulia: Maracaibo.
- Colomina, Marta (1976) La Celestina Mecánica: estudio sobre la mitología de lo femenino, la mujer y su manipulación a través de la industria cultural. Herrero Hermanos: Caracas.
- Colomina, Marta; Villasmil, Xiomara (1974) Los medios de comunicación de masas: el estereotipo del delincuente. Universidad del Zulia: Maracaibo.
