= Ibéyise Pacheco =

Venezuelan journalist and writer

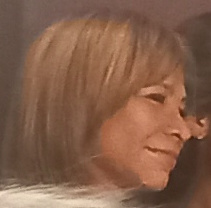
- Ibéyise Pacheco in 2023
- Born: 29 January 1961 (age 65); Caracas, Venezuela
- Education: Central University of Venezuela
- Occupations: Journalist, writer
- Notable work: Sangre en el Diván; El grito ignorado
- Awards: 1988 National Prize for Journalism, mention for investigative journalism
- Website: lapacheco.com

Signature
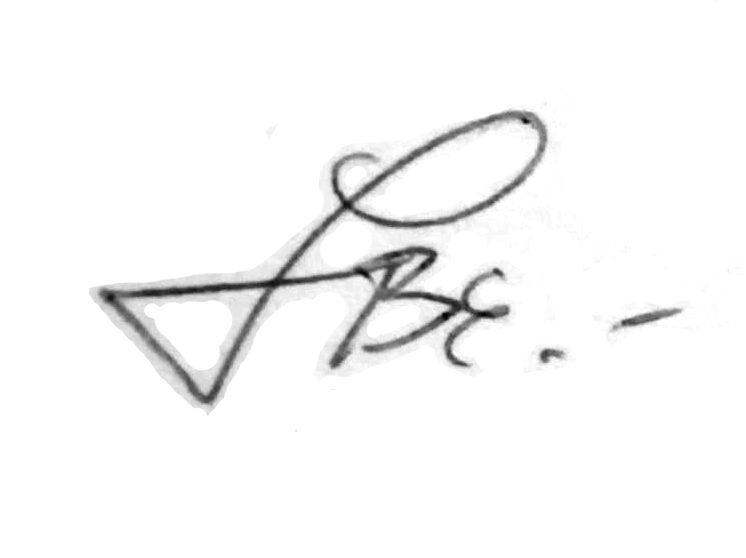

Ibéyise Pacheco (born 29 January 1961) is a Venezuelan journalist and writer, specializing in investigative journalism, who has been linked with politics due to her opposition to the governments of Hugo Chávez and Nicolás Maduro.

== Biography ==
=== Career ===
Ibéyise Pacheco graduated from the Central University of Venezuela at the age of 25 with a Bachelor in Social Communication. At the time she was also interested in literature, and had won a scholarship for narrative writing in the Centro de Estudios Latinoamericanos Rómulo Gallegos (CELARG). While still in university, she worked for the newspaper El Universal as a test corrector, and for the television channel RCTV as a writer on several telenovelas.

After her graduation in 1986, she started her professional career working for El Diario de Caracas as an investigative journalist. Her coverage and publication of her first case Los Pozos de la muerte (The Death Wells), about the search for, and discovery of, the bodies of people who had disappeared at the hands of state police in Zulia, had significant international repercussions. In 1988 Pacheco was awarded the National Prize for Journalism, mention for investigative journalism, for her work on the “Manzopol” case, which dealt with extortion and drug trafficking connected with the police. The investigation caused the Minister of Justice, José Manzo González, to resign.

Ibéyise Pacheco also worked as head writer for the newspaper El Nacional and as director of the newspaper Así es la noticia. She ventured into radio with programs such as Radio Venezuela, Kyss and Mágica, and television with the program En Privado broadcast by Venevisión.

In 2006 she published her first book, Bajo la sotana. ¡Las Confesiones del Padre Pablo! (Beneath the Cassock. The Confessions of Father Pablo!). In 2011 she published one of her most recognized works: Sangre en el Diván: el extraordinario caso del doctor Chirinos (Blood on the Divan: The Extraordinary Case of Doctor Chirinos), about the sexual abuse and murder of journalism student Roxana Vargas, patient of president Chávez' psychiatrist Edmundo Chirinos, and in 2012 she published El Grito Ignorado (The Ignored Scream). Currently she maintains a forum for analysis of Venezuela's political and social panorama called 3 minutos con La Pacheco (3 minutes with Pacheco), broadcast weekly on NTN24.

=== Confrontation with the government ===
Pacheco was politically persecuted during the government of Hugo Chávez due to her commentaries and investigations, and has faced 17 legal proceedings. This persecution has continued during the government of Nicolás Maduro; she has repeatedly denounced, on social networks, attacks directed at her by those in power, such as the raid on her house in Colinas de Bello Monte, Caracas, and the hacking of her Twitter account.

Pacheco has categorized the government of president Maduro as a dictatorship that tries to keep news of interest to the population secret, and for this reason she aims to promote worthy and responsible journalism that delivers truthful information to Venezuelans.

=== Personal attack ===
On 31 January 2002 the head office of the newspaper directed by Pacheco, Así es la noticia, was attacked with an explosive tossed by two persons on a motorcycle. This occurred a day after she and journalists Patricia Poleo, Marta Colomina, and Marianella Salazar published a video about conversations between the Venezuelan Army and the Colombian guerrilla FARC. Two months later the Inter-American Court of Human Rights issued a protection measure for the group.

== Books ==
- Bajo la Sotana. ¡Las Confesiones del Padre Pablo! (Beneath the Cassock. The Confessions of Father Pablo!): Her first book, published in 2006 by El Nacional. Written after recording various interviews with former priest Pablo Hernández. Pacheco discloses the workings of the ecclesiastical world, starting from the revelations of Hernández.
- Sangre en el Diván: El extraordinario caso del doctor Chirinos (Blood on the Divan: The Extraordinary Case of Doctor Chirinos): Ibéyise Pacheco's most famous work. This book relates the story of the death of Roxana Vargas, a journalism student who was treated by the well-known psychiatrist Edmundo Chirinos, and the subsequent investigation. Chirinos was accused of sexually abusing Vargas and other patients, and was convicted of murdering Vargas. This case had serious repercussions on public opinion in the country, because then-president Hugo Chávez had also been a patient of Chirinos, and Chirinos had been a prominent academic and politician. Due to the great interest of Venezuelans in the case, the author decided to adapt the book for the theatre, in the form of a dramatic monologue. The theatrical work focused on the chapter El Delirio, and has seen more than 100 performances in the Centro Cultural BOD in Caracas; it has also been performed in other Venezuelan states further inland, and internationally in Miami and Panama. In 2015 the channel Venevisión Plus broadcast a drama series based on the book.
- El grito ignorado (The Ignored Scream): Brings together information on the case of a boy who was murdered in Guanare, in the state of Portuguesa, after being abused and maltreated for years by his family. Pacheco focuses on collecting data about the crime and constructing a psychological profile of the child's abusers. She also strongly criticizes the public institutions, which did not act in accordance with written laws for the protection of minors, and highlights the passivity of Venezuelan society towards situations of familial abuse.
- Demente criminal (Criminal Lunatic): With this new edition of Sangre en el Diván, Ibéyise Pacheco took her writing to the United States and international markets.
