= Edmundo Chirinos =

Venezuelan psychiatrist and convict

Personal details
- Born: 12 August 1935 Churuguara, Estado Falcón
- Died: 24 August 2013 (aged 78) Caracas, Venezuela
- Occupation: Politician
- Profession: Psychiatrist

Edmundo Chirinos (12 August 1935 – 24 August 2013) was a Venezuelan serial rapist and murderer. In September 2010, Chirinos was convicted of the murder of 19-year-old communications studies student Roxana Vargas, who was one of his patients, and was sentenced to 20 years in prison.
