= Caracas Chronicles =

Venezuelan website

- Available in: English
- Website: www.caracaschronicles.com
- Launched: 2002
- Current status: Active

Caracas Chronicles is a group blog providing Venezuelan news and analysis in English, with a focus on Venezuelan politics and economics during the Chávez and post-Chávez eras. The website once described itself as "opposition-leaning-but-not-insane." According to an Associated Press article, although highly critical of Venezuela's socialist government, the site "doesn't spare the opposition".

== History ==
Caracas Chronicles was founded in 2002 by Francisco (Quico) Toro. In 2015, it was relaunched as a Florida-registered LLC. According to its website, it now has a newsroom in Caracas, correspondents throughout Venezuela, and plans to become "a more professional news site based on exacting journalistic standards".

In February 2019, Rafael Osío Cabrices took over as editor-in-chief. According to Caracas Chronicles, Osío Cabrices worked at Venezuela's El Nacional, on the Primicia news magazine, and has published three books: El Horizonte Encendido, Apuntes Bajo el Aguacero and Salitre en el Corazón. Before the appointment of Osío Cabrices, Toro—a Venezuelan political scientist living in Canada—had alternated in the role of editor-in-chief with Juan Nagel, a Venezuelan economist and professor at the University of the Andes, Chile.

== Reception ==
The Associated Press says that the website's "English-language musings are a must-read for foreign journalists, academics and political junkies".

Following the death of President Hugo Chávez, José de Córdoba wrote in Americas Quarterly:

Caracas Chronicles, an English-language blog that has provided a running narration since 2002 of the Chávez era, will continue to be an indispensable tool of analysis and information for addicts of the Chávez story—a story that so far has managed to outlive the flamboyant president. ... One hopes that Venezuelans, and everyone else interested in the fate of the country, will continue to be served by the entertaining and insightful dispatches of Caracas Chronicles.

David Frum said at The Daily Beast that Chavismo was not sustainable, and that when oil prices declined, Caracas Chronicles "will be the essential guide".
