= Tovar Municipality, Aragua =

Tovar Municipality Municipio Tovar
- Municipality
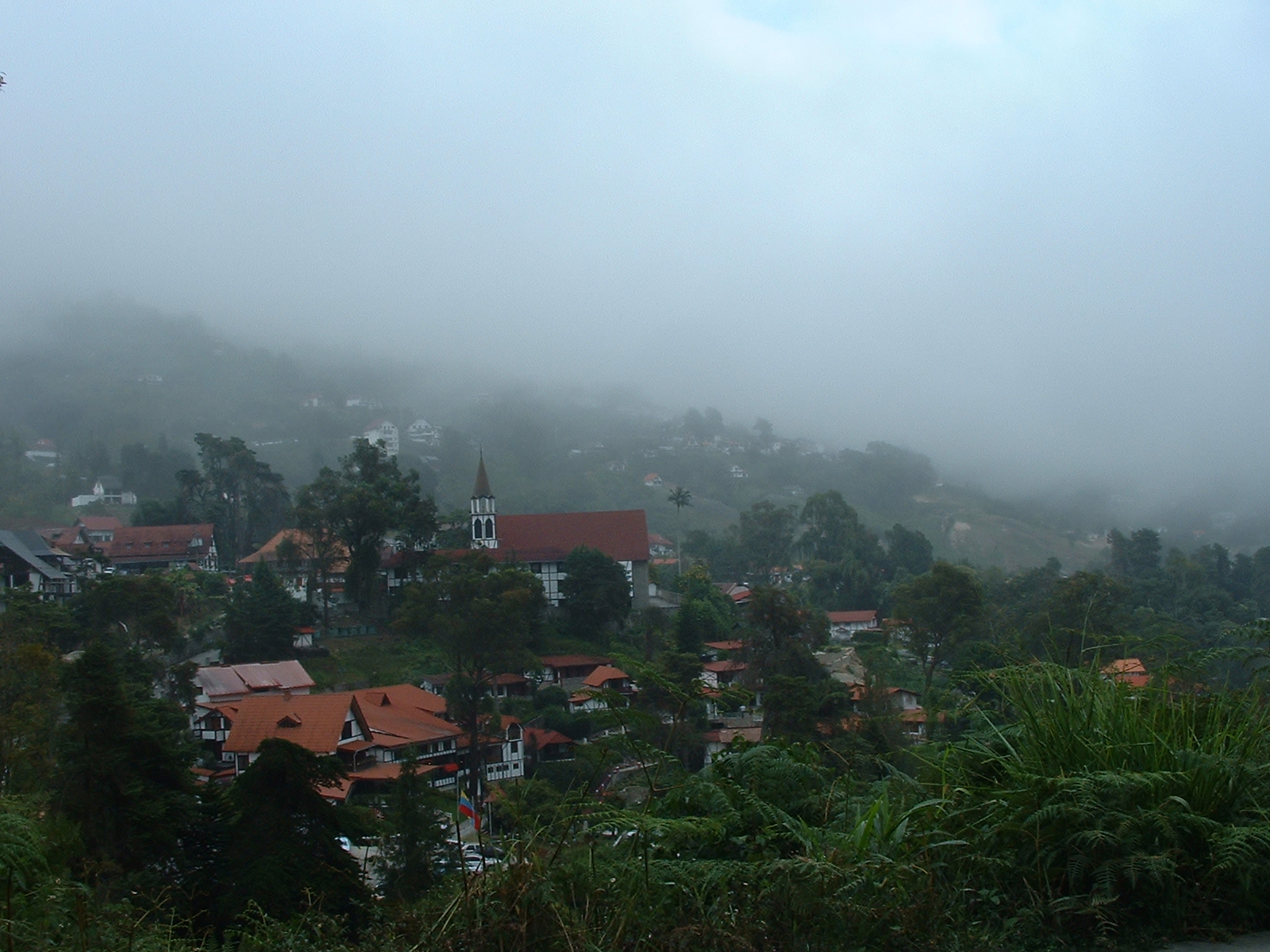
- La Colonia Tovar

- Flag Coat of arms

- Location in Aragua

- Location in Venezuela
- Coordinates: 10°22′29″N 67°19′25″W
- Country: Venezuela
- State: Aragua
- Municipal seat: Colonia Tovar

Government
  - Mayor: Maximiliano Suárez Castillo ((PSUV))

Area
  - Total: 260.2 km^{2} (100.5 sq mi)

Population (2011)
  - Total: 14,161
  - Density: 54.42/km^{2} (141.0/sq mi)
- Time zone: UTC−4 (VET)
- Area code(s): 0244

The Tovar Municipality is one of the 18 municipalities (municipios) that makes up the Venezuelan state of Aragua and, according to the 2011 census by the National Institute of Statistics of Venezuela, the municipality has a population of 14,161. The town of Colonia Tovar is the shire town of the Tovar Municipality.

== History ==
The village of La Colonia Tovar (The Tovar Colony) is located about 60 km from Caracas. The town was named after Martín Tovar y Ponte who donated the land over 100 years ago. The town is mainly known for its Germanic characteristics, culture, and a dessert called "golfiado", which is very similar to a Cinnamon roll. Founded in 1843 by German settlers, the city remained isolated from the rest of the country for decades, a factor that permitted the inhabitants to keep their culture and traditions. The majority of its residents are descendants of Germans and have a Northern European appearance. The Alemannic dialect of German, known as Alemán Coloniero ("Colonial German"), is nearly extinct.

Today, 6,000 people live in the main village, up from 1,300 in 1963.

Due to the cool climate and pleasant surrounding countryside, it is a popular week-end destination for many visitors from Caracas. Many houses are weekend retreats and second homes. There is a wide range of hotels, restaurants and tourist facilities, many of which are only open on the weekend.

The town and surrounding mountainous countryside have a superficial resemblance to Southern Germany. The visitor will occasionally see Germanic oddities such as waitresses in traditional Bavarian dress hawking "torta selva negra" and the odd "D" plate on some cars, but will be unlikely to find anyone who understands German fluently.

== Geography ==
Colonia Tovar, at about 2,000 meters above sea level, has an annual average temperature of 16 degrees Celsius (61 degrees Fahrenheit), and at night it can drop to around 5 °C.

== Economy ==
The cost of living is higher here than elsewhere in Venezuela. The town depends mostly on tourism and peach agriculture. The surrounding cloud forests are protected by the Pico Codazzi Natural Monument, though some signs of deforestation are visible due to the high tourist demand from Caracas, and the extraction of tree fern, sold dry for growing orchids. The town is situated on a steep hillside, making the street layout difficult and poorly suited to the heavy weekend traffic. During the week the town can be virtually deserted.

== Demographics ==
The Tovar Municipality, according to a 2007 population estimate by the National Institute of Statistics of Venezuela, has a population of 17,429 (up from 14,798 in 2000). This amounts to 1% of the state's population. The municipality's population density is 77.46 inhabitants per square kilometre (200.6/sq mi).

== Government ==
The mayor of the Tovar Municipality is Esteban Bocaranda, elected on October 31, 2004, with 33% of the vote. He replaced Alfredo Durr shortly after the elections. The municipality is divided into one parish; Capital Tovar.

== See also ==
- La Colonia Tovar
- Aragua
- Municipalities of Venezuela
- German colonization of the Americas
