= El Nuevo País =

Venezuelan newspaper

- Type: Daily newspaper
- Format: Tabloid
- Owner: Rafael Poleo
- Publisher: Producciones Impretele, S.A.
- Founded: 1988
- Headquarters: Caracas; Venezuela
- Circulation: 50,000

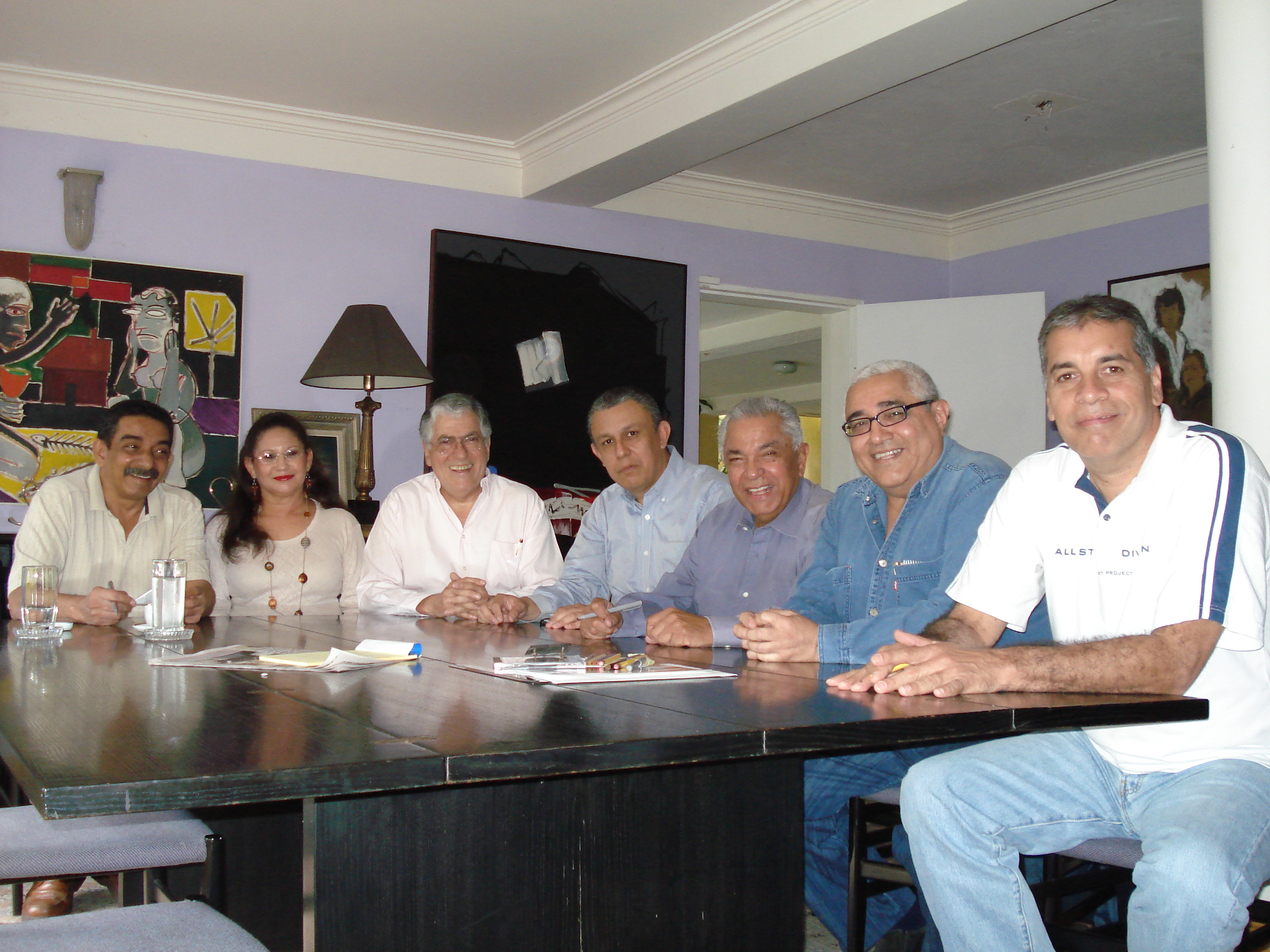
The Board of Directors of El Nuevo País taken in February 2007. From left to right: Francisco Orta, Zaira González, Editor-Proprietor Rafael Poleo, Executive Director Edgar C. Otálvora, Manuel Graterol "Graterolacho," Jaime Granda, and Production Manager Luis Camacho.

El Nuevo País is a Venezuelan newspaper. It was established by Rafael Poleo in 1988.

Rafael Poleo is also the current Director, with Luisa Salomón being the Chief of Newsroom. The newspaper is edited by Producciones Impretele, S.A., which is owned by Rafael Poleo and directed by Francisco Poleo as the Vice President Executive. Currently, according to the numbers of the newspaper's distributor El Universal, El Nuevo Pais is the second daily in regards of circulation and sells in Venezuela.

== See also ==
- List of newspapers in Venezuela
