= Rafael Poleo =

Venezuelan politician and journalist

Rafael David Poleo Isava (born 19 September 1937) is a Venezuelan journalist and politician.

== Career ==
He is the editor and proprietor of the newspaper El Nuevo País, which he founded in 1988, and of the political magazine Zeta (named for the 1969 film Z), which he founded in 1973. Previously he was the director of El Mundo (appointed by Miguel Ángel Capriles Ayala at the age of 23, c. 1960) director of RCTV's news division for six years, and the founding editor of Bloque De Armas' Diario 2001, launched in 1973. He was at one time a member of the Venezuelan Chamber of Deputies for Democratic Action, and was elected to the Venezuelan Senate in the 1998 election.

In 1991 Poleo published accusations of corruption against then-President Carlos Andrés Pérez, with El Nuevo País publishing a copy of a $400m cheque which it said had been deposited at the Bank of Credit and Commerce International in New York in the name of Pérez' mistress, Cecilia Matos. Poleo fled Venezuela after being warned by a Congressman that the DISIP secret police were going to kill him. The evening after his departure, his house was attacked and ransacked, and a military intelligence agent guarding it killed. An arrest warrant was then issued for Poleo, accusing him of staging the attack and killing the guard. Poleo continued to contribute columns to El Nuevo País and Zeta from exile in Florida. Poleo was only able to return in June 1993, after Andrés Pérez had been charged with corruption and temporarily left office, with the new government dropping the charges against Poleo. Pérez' temporary removal from office was made permanent in August 1993, and he was convicted of corruption and sentenced to 28 months' imprisonment in 1996.

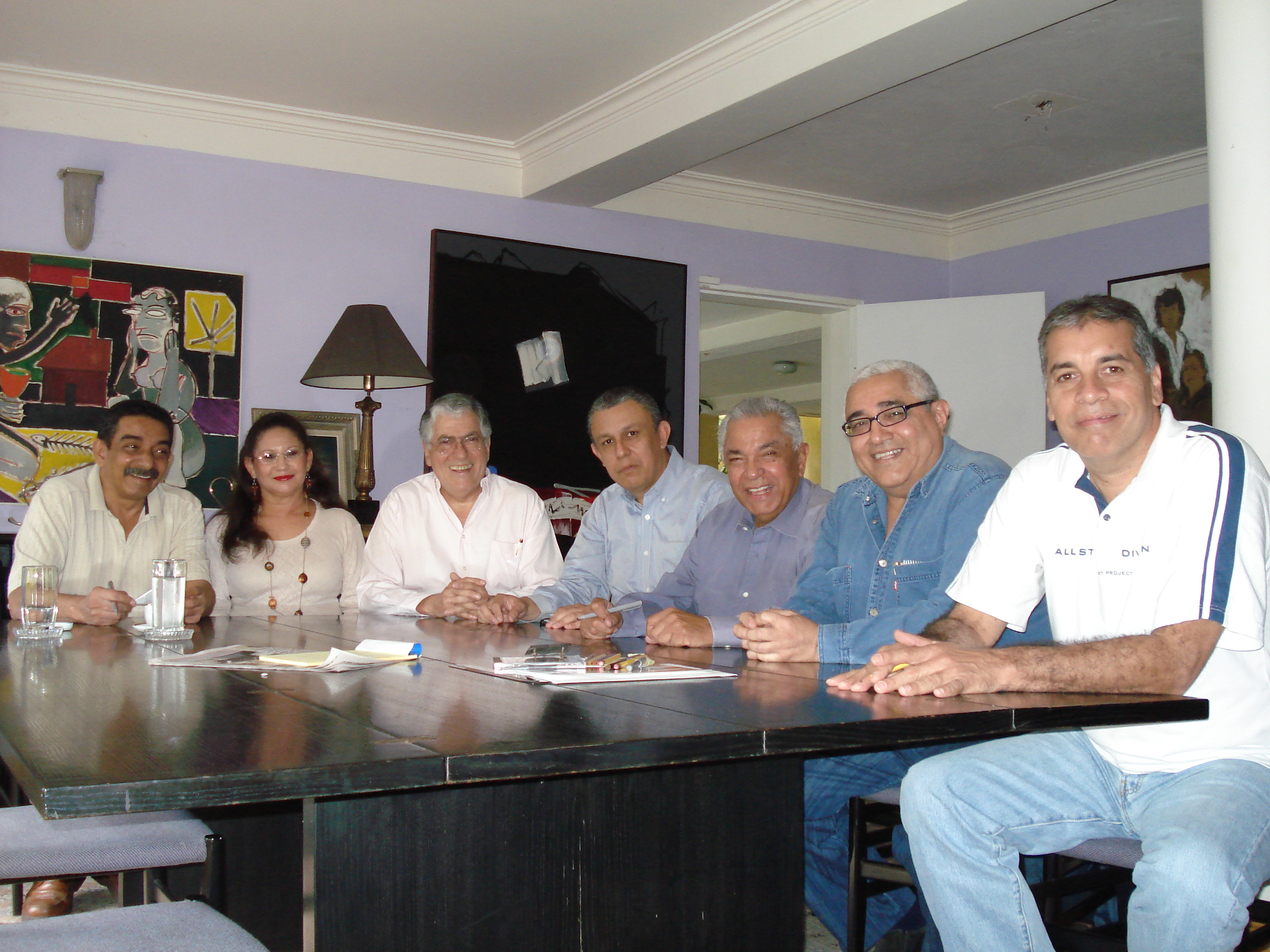
Rafael Poleo, third from left to right at a meeting of the management team of the newspaper "El Nuevo País" in 2007.

Poleo left Venezuela for Florida a second time after charges were brought over remarks he made in a Globovisión television programme in 2008. On 13 October 2008 on Aló Ciudadano he said "I am concerned that Hugo (Chávez) may end his days like Mussolini did: hanging heels over head." According to El Universal, "Government officials branded such remarks as solicitation to assassination, civil disobedience and rebellion against the public powers."

Poleo has four children, three of them active in the field of journalism.
