= Tovar Municipality, Mérida =

Tovar Municipality Municipio Tovar
- Municipality
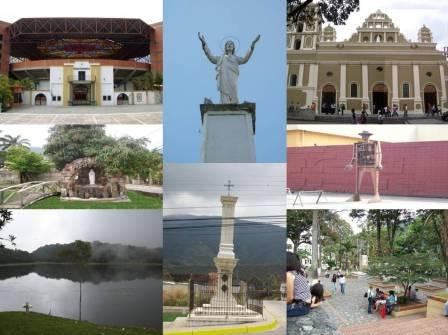
- Left:Liano Bullring Colseum Tovar Rose Mysical of Altar, Lagoon Mariño in Juan Pablo Peñolaza National Park, Middle:Tovar Cristo Ray Monument, La Batalla Mariño Monument, Right:Tovar Cathedral, Campesino Monument in Tovar Compesino Square, Tovar Bolivar Square (all item from above to bottom)

- Flag Coat of arms

- Location in Mérida

- Location in Venezuela
- Coordinates: 8°19′41″N 71°45′33″W
- Country: Venezuela
- State: Mérida

Government
  - Mayor: Yvan Di Marcantonio (PSUV))

Population (2013)
  - Total: 41,867
- Time zone: UTC−4 (VET)
- Area code(s): 0275

Tovar Municipality is a municipality in Mérida State, Venezuela. The population of Tovar measured by the 2013 census was 41,867. It is the birthplace of Major League Baseball player, Johan Santana.

People native to Tovar are referred to as Tovareños. There is a recent movement to preserve some vintage photos of the town and its people.

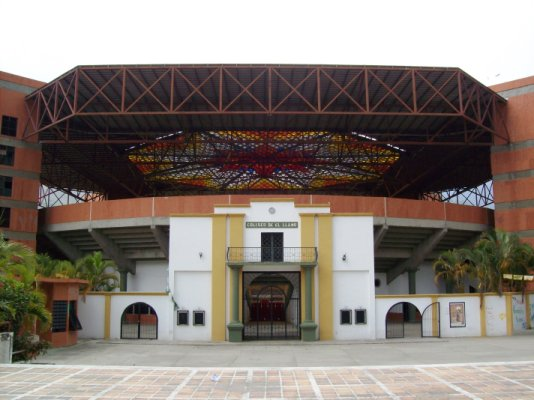
Tovar Bullring arena
