= List of assassinations =

This is a list of successful assassinations, sorted by location. An assassination is defined as the deliberate murder of a prominent figure, often for political or ideological reasons.

== Americas ==
=== Antigua and Barbuda ===
Date	Victim(s)	Assassin(s)	Notes
7 December 1710	Daniel Parke, British governor of the Leeward Islands	Several members of a mob.	An angry mob captured Parke in his house, beat him severely, and dragged him out to die of his wounds. His last words to his tormentors, as he lay dying, were reported as: "Gentlemen, you have no sense of honor left, pray have some of humanity."

=== Argentina ===
Date	Victim(s)	Assassin(s)	Notes
1835	Facundo Quiroga, Governor of La Rioja Province	José Vicente Reynafé, Reynafé brothers, Capt. Santos Pérez	While returning to Buenos Aires, armed men ambushed his carriage; Quiroga was shot in his left eye when he left the carriage to negotiate.
1838	Alejandro Heredia, Governor of Tucumán Province	Gabino Robles, Vicente Neirot, Lucio Casas, Gregorio Uriarte	Heredia was shot in the head when he and his son were ambushed by an armed party. The perpetrators left Heredia and his son. The body was discovered 2 days later
1841	José Cubas, Governor of Catamarca Province	Mariano Maza	
1841	Marco Avellaneda, Governor of Tucumán Province	Mariano Maza	
1861	Antonino Aberastain, Governor of San Juan Province		
1863	Chacho Peñaloza, La Rioja Province insurrectionist	Col. Pablo Irrazábal	
1870	Justo José de Urquiza, former president of Argentina and Governor of Entre Ríos Province		
1889	Ricardo López Jordán, soldier, politician, and former governor of Entre Ríos Province		
1908	Mariano Santillán, Jr., National Deputy for Santiago del Estero Province		
1909	Ramón Falcón, chief of the National Police	Simón Radowitzky	Assassinated by anarchists as a retaliation for his brutal repression of workers.
1921	Amable Jones, Governor of San Juan Province		
1929	Carlos Washington Lencinas, former Governor of Mendoza Province		
1935	Enzo Bordabehere, National Senator for Santa Fe Province	Ramón Valdez Cora	Killed during a session of the Argentine Senate.
1969	Augusto Vandor, Metalworkers Union (UOM) Secretary General		Killed in commando attack by the Ejército Nacional Revolucionario (National Revolutionary Army), a far-left Peronist splinter group.
1970	Pedro Aramburu, former de facto president of Argentina		See Assassination of Pedro Eugenio Aramburu
1970	José Alonso, CGT Secretary General	Montoneros	
1972	Oberdan Sallustro, Director of FIAT Argentina	ERP	
1973	José Ignacio Rucci, CGT Secretary General	Montoneros	
1974	Arturo Mor Roig, former Interior Minister	Montoneros	
1974	Carlos Mugica, Catholic Third World priest	Rodolfo Almirón (Argentine Anticommunist Alliance)	
1974	Rodolfo Ortega Peña, National Deputy for Buenos Aires Province	Argentine Anticommunist Alliance	
1974	Atilio López, former Vice-Governor of Córdoba Province	Argentine Anticommunist Alliance	
1974	Silvio Frondizi, University of Buenos Aires law professor	Argentine Anticommunist Alliance	
1974	Carlos Prats, exiled Chilean general, former Commander-in-chief of the Chilean Army	Michael Townley	Killed by the secret service of the Pinochet dictatorship
1975	Hipólito Acuña, National Deputy for Santa Fe Province	Montoneros	
1975	John Egan, U.S. Honorary Consul in Córdoba	Montoneros	
1975	Rubén Cartier, Mayor of La Plata	CNU, a right-wing student group liked to the Triple A	
1975	Ramón Rojas, National Deputy for San Juan Province	Fernando Otero	Killed at the behest of Vineyard Workers' Federation (FOEVA) leader Delfor Ocampo.
1975	Alberto Manuel Campos, Mayor of General San Martín Partido, Buenos Aires Province	Montoneros	
1976	Miguel Ragone, former governor of Salta Province	Army Gen. Luciano Menéndez	Abducted and killed by right-wing task force made of up of Army and provincial police officers led by Menéndez.
1976	Zelmar Michelini, exiled Uruguayan senator, founder of the Broad Front		Killed after the 1976 Argentine coup as part of Operation Condor involving the collaboration between military dictatorships in the Southern Cone.
1976	Héctor Gutiérrez Ruiz, exiled former speaker of the Uruguayan House of Representatives		Killed after the 1976 Argentine coup as part of Operation Condor involving the collaboration between military dictatorships in the Southern Cone.
1976	Juan José Torres, exiled former military President of Bolivia		Killed as part of Operation Condor
1976	Enrique Angelelli, Bishop of the Roman Catholic Diocese of La Rioja	Luis Estrella	Beaten to death after Angelelli's car was run off the road on orders from III Army Corps Chief Luciano Menéndez.
1977	Juan Carlos Casariego de Bel, Chief Foreign Investments Adviser at Economy Ministry	Army Capt. Héctor Vérgez	Casariego had objected to a 400 million payout for the nationalization of the bankrupt CIADE electric company - one of whose top shareholders was the Economy Minister, José Alfredo Martínez de Hoz.
1978	Miguel Tobías Padilla, Undersecretary for Coordination at Economy Ministry	Montoneros	
1985	Osvaldo Sivak, banker	José Benigno Lorea, police officer	Killed following ransom kidnapping by the Aníbal Gordon gang led by former Argentine Anticommunist Alliance operatives.
1997	José Luis Cabezas, photojournalist for leading Argentine news weekly Noticias.	"Los Horneros" gang, led by Buenos Aires Provincial Police Inspector Gustavo Prellezo	Killed on orders from businessman Alfredo Yabrán.
2019	Héctor Enrique Olivares, National Deputy for La Rioja Province	Juan Jesús Fernández and Juan José Navarro Cádiz	Killed in attack directed at Olivares' aide, Miguel Yadón (dead on arrival), by businessman Rafael Cano Carmona.

=== Bermuda ===
Date	Victim(s)	Assassin(s)	Notes
1973	Richard Sharples, Governor of Bermuda	Erskine "Buck" Burrows and Larry Tacklyn	Shot outside Bermuda's Government House. Sharples's aide-de-camp Captain Hugh Sayers was also killed.

=== Bolivia ===
Date	Victim(s)	Assassin(s)	Notes
1 January 1829	Pedro Blanco Soto, President of Bolivia		Killed after being overthrown and taken prisoner.
11 June 1849	Eusebio Guilarte, former acting president of Bolivia		
23 October 1861	Jorge Córdova, former president of Bolivia		
23 March 1865	Manuel Isidoro Belzu, former president of Bolivia		
27 November 1872	Agustín Morales, President of Bolivia	Federico Lafaye	
27 February 1894	Hilarión Daza, former president of Bolivia		Assassinated after returning from exile.
17 June 1917	José Manuel Pando, former president of Bolivia		
21 July 1946	Gualberto Villarroel, President of Bolivia		Killed by mob.
9 August 1967	Che Guevara, revolutionary	Captured and executed by Bolivian Special Forces	
12 May 1973	Monika Ertl, communist militant and guerilla fighter		Ambushed along with a fellow guerilla by Bolivian security forces in present-day El Alto in retaliation for the assassination of former head of intelligence in the ministry of internal affairs Roberto Quintanilla.
24 May 1989	Elders Jeffrey Brent Ball and Todd Ray Wilson, LDS Missionaries	Zarate Willka Armed Forces of Liberation	
25 August 2016	Rodolfo Illanes, Deputy Minister of Internal Affairs of Bolivia	Protesting miners	

=== Brazil ===
Date	Victim(s)	Assassin(s)	Notes
1678	Ganga Zumba, leader of Quilombo dos Palmares		
1695	Zumbi, leader of Quilombo dos Palmares	Portuguese colonial authorities	
1830	Líbero Badaró, journalist		The assassination unleashed a wave of protests against the government of Pedro I of Brazil
1897	Carlos Machado de Bitterncourt, Minister of War	Marcelino Bispo de Melo	See Attempted assassination of Prudente de Morais
1908	José Plácido de Castro, former president of the Republic of Acre		
1915	Pinheiro Machado, Senator for Rio Grande do Sul		
1929	José Gomes Duarte, Mayor of Bauru, São Paulo	Moacir de Almeida	
1929	Manuel Francisco de Sousa Filho, Federal Deputy for Pernambuco	Ildefonso Simões Lopes	
1930	João Pessoa Cavalcânti de Albuquerque, Governor of Paraíba	João Duarte Dantas	
1938	Virgulino Ferreira da Silva "Lampião", leader bandit of Cangaço		Killed during the Massacre of Angico, led by João Bezerra da Silva
1938	Maria Gomes de Oliveira "Maria Bonita", bandit of Cangaço	José Panta de Godoy	Killed during the Massacre of Angico, led by João Bezerra da Silva
1964	Adib Shishakli, exiled Syrian military dictator	Nawaf Ghazaleh	
1971	Rubens Paiva, former Federal Deputy for São Paulo and critic of the Military dictatorship in Brazil		
1973	Maurício Grabois, leader of the Communist Party of Brazil		
1975	Vladimir Herzog, journalist		
1976	Zuzu Angel, fashion designer and critic of the Military dictatorship in Brazil		
1986	Josimo Morais Tavares, Catholic priest and coordinator of the Comissão Pastoral da Terra	Ranchers	Killed by ranchers for his support of rural workers.
1988	Francisco "Chico" Alves Mendes Filho, environmental activist	Darci Alves Pereira	Shot on the orders of the assassin's father, rancher Darly Alves da Silva
1992	Edmundo Pinto, Governor of Acre		
1996	Paulo César Farias, President Fernando Collor de Mello's campaign treasurer		
2001	Antonio da Costa Santos, Mayor of Campinas, São Paulo		
2001	Aguinaldo Pereira da Silva, Mayor of Caraúbas, Rio Grande do Norte		
2002	Celso Daniel, Mayor of Santo André, São Paulo		
2002	Tim Lopes, journalist	Elias "Maluco" Pereira da Silva; André "Capeta" da Cruz Barbosa; Cláudio "Ratinho" Orlando do Nascimento; Maurício "Boizinho" de Lima Matias; Claudino "Xuxa" dos Santos Coelho; Elizeu "Zeu" Felício de Souza; Ângelo "Primo" da Silva; Reinaldo "Cadê" Amaral de Jesus; Fernando "Frei" Sátyro da Silva	Murdered by drug traffickers connected to Comando Vermelho and Amigos dos Amigos
2002	Lídia Menezes, Vice Mayor of Magé, Rio de Janeiro		
2005	Dorothy Stang, American nun	Raifran das Neves Sales	Killed by business interests
2010	Walderi Braz Paschoalin, Mayor of Jandira, São Paulo		
2016	José Gomes Da Rocha, former mayor of Itumbiara, Goiás, and mayoral candidate	Gilberto Ferreira do Amaral	
2016	Kyriakos Amiridis, Greek ambassador to Brazil	Françoise de Sousa Oliveira and Sergio Gomes	Murdered by Gomes on the orders of Oliveira, and corpse burnt in an arson attack on a rental car.
2018	Marielle Franco, human rights activist and City Councillor of Rio de Janeiro	Ronnie Lessa and Élcio Vieira de Queiroz	Convicted assassins reportedly hired by local militias
2018	Gerson Camata, former Governor of Espírito Santo	Marcos Vinícius Moreira Andrade	
2019	Paulo Paulino Guajajara, Indigenous environmental activist		Murdered by illegal loggers.
2023	Mãe Bernadete, community activist		

=== Canada ===
Date	Victim(s)	Assassin(s)	Notes
7 April 1868	Thomas D'Arcy McGee, Father of Canadian Confederation	Patrick J. Whelan	
14 December 1872	William End, Magistrate in northern New Brunswick		He and his office set aflame by ex-convict.
9 May 1880	George Brown, Father of Canadian Confederation	George Bennett	
21 October 1914	William C. Hopkinson, immigration officer, British intelligence agent	Mewa Singh, Ghadarite sympathizer	
29 October 1924	Peter Verigin, Russian philosopher, activist, leader of the Community Doukhobors in Canada		Assassinated via train explosion. The explosion also killed member of the provincial legislature John McKie. Perpetrators never identified.
17 October 1970	Pierre Laporte, Deputy Premier and Minister of Labour of Quebec	Bernard Lortie, Paul Rose, Jacques Rose, Francis Simard	Kidnapped and murdered by the FLQ.
27 August 1982	Atilla Altıkat, Turkish diplomat	Armenian Secret Army For the Liberation of Armenia	Assassinated by Armenian nationalists in Ottawa.
10 March 1993	Dino Bravo, wrestler		Shot eleven times at his home in Vimont, Laval, Quebec. Believed to have been a result in his alleged role in illegal cigarette smuggling in Canada and his ties to the Cotroni Crime Family.
1 August 1995	Brian Smith, sports anchor and former ice hockey player	Jeffery Arenburg	Shot outside the CJOH-DT studio, died the next day.
18 November 1998	Tara Singh Hayer, founder of the Indo-Canadian Times, Journalist		Outspoken critic of extremism, key witness in the trial of the Air India 182 Flight Bombing. This was the third attempt on his life, the first was a thwarted bombing and the second, a shooting, had left him paralysed.
10 November 2010	Nicolo Rizzuto, crime boss and founder of the Rizzuto crime family		Shot by a sniper's bullet through the rear patio doors of his mansion in the Cartiervill borough of Montreal. On July 12, 2013, Salvatore Calautti, a Toronto criminal figure, suspected by police of being the assassin who shot Rizzuto, was shot dead.
14 July 2022	Ripudaman Singh Malik, Air India bombing suspect	Tanner Fox and Jose Lopez	Shot and killed outside his business. The two hitmen admit to being paid to perform the killing but it has not yet been determined by whom.
18 June 2023	Hardeep Singh Nijjar, Canadian Sikh involved with the Khalistan movement	Four people currently arrested awaiting trial.	Allegedly assassinated on orders of the Indian government for his role in the Khalistani movement.

=== Chile ===
Date	Victim(s)	Assassin(s)	Notes
1818	Luis Carrera and his brother Juan José Carrera, independence war heroes	Attributed to the head of the government, Bernardo O'Higgins	
1818	Manuel Rodriguez, lawyer and guerrilla leader, considered one of the founders of independent Chile	Attributed to the head of the government, Bernardo O'Higgins	
1837	Diego Portales, entrepreneur, statesman and Minister of War	Colonel José Antonio Vidaurre	
1970	René Schneider, Commander-in-Chief of the Chilean Army		Was kidnapped and killed by far-right paramilitary squads, due to his opposition to any intervention of the armed forces to block the election of left-wing candidate Salvador Allende in 1970.
1971	Edmundo Pérez Zujovic, former Secretary of Interior Affairs		
1973	Víctor Jara, left-wing singer		Killed after the coup of 1973.
1982	Eduardo Frei Montalva, former President of Chile and opponent of the Pinochet dictatorship		Although he officially died by sepsis after a low-risk surgery, recent research suggests he was poisoned by the Dirección de Inteligencia Nacional. However, there is no absolute certainty about the real causes of his death.
1982	Tucapel Jiménez, trade-unionist		Killed by the military dictatorship of Augusto Pinochet.
1991	Jaime Guzmán, right-wing Senator and former adviser to the Pinochet dictatorship		Killed by far-left guerrillas after the return of democracy.

=== Colombia ===
Date	Victim(s)	Assassin(s)	Notes
1830	Antonio José de Sucre, Venezuelan politician, statesman, soldier	Juan Gregorio Sarria, José Erazo, and three peons	
1861	José María Obando, former President		
1914	Rafael Uribe Uribe, lawyer, journalist, diplomat, soldier		
1948	Jorge Eliécer Gaitán, Liberal Party leader	Juan Roa Sierra	His assassination sparked the Bogotazo and served as a catalyst for La Violencia
1984	Carlos Toledo Plata, early leader of the M-19 guerrilla movement and member of the Chamber of Representatives of Colombia		
1984	Rodrigo Lara Bonilla, Minister of Justice		The assassination was ordered by the Medellin Cartel
1985	Tulio Manuel Castro Gil, Judge who had indicted Pablo Escobar		
1985	Alfonso Reyes Echandia, Head of the Supreme Court.		Killed during the Palace of Justice Siege.
1985	Fabio Calderon Botero, Supreme Court Justice		Killed during the Palace of Justice Siege.
1985	Pedro Elias Serrano Abadia, Supreme Court Justice		Killed during the Palace of Justice Siege.
1985	Dario Velasquez Gaviria, Supreme Court Justice		Killed during the Palace of Justice Siege.
1985	Jose Eduardo Gnecco Correa, Supreme Court Justice		Killed during the Palace of Justice Siege.
1985	Ricardo Medina Moyano, Supreme Court Justice		Killed during the Palace of Justice Siege.
1985	Alfonso Patiño Rosselli, Supreme Court Justice		Killed during the Palace of Justice Siege.
1985	Carlos Medellin Forero, Supreme Court Justice		Killed during the Palace of Justice Siege.
1985	Fanny Gonzalez Franco, Supreme Court Justice		Killed during the Palace of Justice Siege.
1985	Dante Luis Fiorillo Porras, Supreme Court Justice		Killed during the Palace of Justice Siege.
1985	Manuel Gaona Cruz, Supreme Court Justice		Killed during the Palace of Justice Siege.
1985	Horacio Montoya Gil, Supreme Court Justice		Killed during the Palace of Justice Siege.
1985	Carlos Horacio Uran Rojas, State Council Assistant Justice		Killed during the Palace of Justice Siege.
1985	Lizandro Juan Romero Barrios, State Council Assistant Justice		Killed during the Palace of Justice Siege.
1985	Emiro Sandoval Huertas, State Council Assistant Justice		Killed during the Palace of Justice Siege.
1985	Julio Cesar Andrade Andrade, State Council Assistant Justice		Killed during the Palace of Justice Siege.
1985	Jorge A Correa Echeverry, State Council Assistant Justice		Killed during the Palace of Justice Siege.
1986	Guillermo Cano Isaza, Director of El Espectador newspaper		The assassination was ordered by the Medellin Cartel
1987	Jaime Pardo Leal, Presidential candidate, leader of the Patriotic Union party		The assassination was ordered by druglord José Gonzalo Rodríguez Gacha.
1987	Carlos Mauro Hoyos, Attorney General of Colombia		The assassination was ordered by the Medellin Cartel.
1989	Teófilo Forero, National Organizing Secretary of the Colombian Communist Party		
1989	Luis Carlos Galán, Presidential candidate, leader of the Colombian Liberal Party	Jaime Rueda	The assassination was ordered by the Medellin Cartel.
1989	Jorge Enrique Pulido, journalist, Director of Mundovision		The assassination was ordered by the Medellin Cartel.
1989	Waldemar Franklin Quintero, Commander of the Police of Antioquia		The assassination was ordered by the Medellin Cartel.
1990	Bernardo Jaramillo Ossa, Presidential candidate, leader of the Patriotic Union party	Andres Arturo Gutierrez	
1990	Carlos Pizarro Leongómez, Presidential candidate, leader of the M-19 party		
1991	Diana Turbay, journalist		Turbay was kidnapped on August 30, 1990, when she was tricked into going to a supposed interview with a guerrilla leader, the Spanish priest Manuel Pérez Martínez, alias El Cura Pérez (The Priest Pérez), orchestrated on the orders of Pablo Escobar. Turbay was kept at Copacabana, Antioquia, with her cameraman Richard Becerra. She died on January 25, 1991, during a botched rescue operation launched by the police without authorization from the family. The cause of death was a bullet in her back, which partially destroyed her liver and left kidney. Becerra was rescued unharmed.
1991	Enrique Low Murtra, former Ambassador to Switzerland	Medellin Cartel	The assassination was ordered by the Medellin Cartel
2 December 1993	Pablo Escobar, drug lord	Search Bloc	Killed during a shoot out in Medellín
2 July 1994	Andrés Escobar, footballer		Believed to have been killed by criminal figures who lost money on bets after Escobar scored an own goal in the 1994 FIFA World Cup that knocked Colombia out of the tournament
1994	Manuel Cepeda Vargas, Senator, leader of the Patriotic Union party		
1995	Alvaro Gómez Hurtado, former presidential candidate and director of El Nuevo Siglo newspaper	FARC (allegedly)	FARC has claimed responsibility for the assassination.
1999	Jaime Garzón, journalist, activist and satirist	Right wing paramilitaries	
2000	Crispiniano Quiñones Quiñones, Colombian Army General		Assassinated by members of FARC
2001	Consuelo Araújo, former Minister of Culture		Assassinated by members of FARC
2003	Guillermo Gaviria Correa, Governor of Antioquia		Assassinated by members of FARC
2003	Gilberto Echeverri Mejía, former Minister of Defense and adviser to Governor Gaviria (see above)		Assassinated by members of FARC
2009	Luis Francisco Cuéllar, Governor of Caquetá		Assassinated by members of FARC
2021	Germán Medina Triviño, former governor of Caquetá		Assassinated by members of FARC
2025	Miguel Uribe Turbay, Senator and presidential pre-candidate		Assassination of Miguel Uribe Turbay Turbay initially survived the assassination, but was hospitalised in critical condition. He died two months later.

=== Costa Rica ===
Date	Victim(s)	Assassin(s)	Notes
23 August 1938	Ricardo Moreno Cañas, doctor and politician, and surgeon Carlos Echandi	Beltrán Cortés	Killed as revenge for a failed surgery the two doctors had operated on Cortes. Moreno was shot to death inside his home, while Echandi was shot to death outside his door. Cortes also killed Canadian Arthur Maynard that same day.
19 June 2025	Roberto Samcam, Nicauraguan opposition politician		Killed by assassin disguised as delivery driver.

=== Cuba ===
Date	Victim(s)	Assassin(s)	Notes
8 May 1935	Antonio Guiteras, Revolutionary Socialist leader		
22 January 1948	Jesús Menéndez, labor leader, trade unionist, communist politician, and congressional representative	Joaquín Casillas	Shot in the back by army captain Casillias of the Rural Guard while exiting a train in Manzanillo, having planned to travel for a collective bargaining drive across Oriente Province. Casillias had attempted to arrest Menéndez under the false pretense he was suspected of breaking the law despite parliamentary immunity. Casillias would later be executed on personal orders of Che Guevara in 1959 in the aftermath of the Battle of Santa Clara in retaliation for murdering Menéndez.

=== Curaçao ===
Date	Victim(s)	Assassin(s)	Notes
5 May 2013	Helmin Wiels, leader of the Sovereign People party.	Elvis Kuwas	

=== Dominican Republic ===
Date	Victim(s)	Assassin(s)	Notes
26 July 1899	Ulises Heureaux, president of the Dominican Republic	Ramón Cáceres, president of the Dominican Republic	
19 November 1911	Ramón Cáceres, president of the Dominican Republic		
30 May 1961	Rafael Leónidas Trujillo, Dominican Republic dictator		Shot in ambush
16 February 1973	Francisco Alberto Caamaño Deñó, military officer and former de facto leader		
6 June 2022	Orlando Jorge Mera, Environment Minister	Fausto Miguel de Jesús Cruz de la Mota	Shot and killed in his office.

=== Ecuador ===
Date	Victim(s)	Assassin(s)	Notes
1875	Gabriel García Moreno, President of Ecuador	Faustino Rayo	Shot outside Quito Cathedral, owing to his pro-religious views.
28 January 1912	Eloy Alfaro, former president of Ecuador		Killed by a mob of pro-Catholic soldiers in Quito.
1999	Jaime Hurtado and Pablo Tapia, communist legislators		Killed in Quito.
28 December 2020	Jorge Luis Zambrano, drug trafficker and head of Los Choneros		Shot at point-blank range at a shopping center in Manta in the company of his wife and his daughter, as well as personnel who offered him protection.
24 July 2023	Agustín Intriago, Mayor of Manta		
9 August 2023	Fernando Villavicencio, Presidential candidate and former legislator		Killed at a campaign rally in Quito.
7 February 2024	Diana Carnero, Member of Naranjal City Council		Shot by hitmen on motorcycles on a public street.
23 March 2024	Brigitte García, mayor of San Vicente		Shot multiple times in her car along with her staffer Jairo Loor. The killer has not been captured.
14 June 2026	Alexandra Bravo, prosecutor		Shot alongside her sister by a gunman on a motorcycle while leaving a cafe in Manta.

=== El Salvador ===
Date	Victim(s)	Assassin(s)	Notes
1 September 1872	Manuel Méndez, Vice President of El Salvador		
9 February 1913	Manuel Enrique Araujo, President of El Salvador	Mulatillo Virgilio, Fabián Graciano, and Fermín Pérez	Motive unknown
10 May 1975	Roque Dalton, poet and revolutionary	People's Revolutionary Army	Executed for criticizing fellow members of the ERP.
12 March 1977	Rutilio Grande García, S.J., Roman Catholic priest		
11 May 1977	Alfonso Navarro Oviedo, Roman Catholic priest		
12 July 1977	Osmín Aguirre y Salinas, former President of El Salvador	Farabundo Martí Popular Liberation Forces	
28 November 1978	Ernesto Barrera, Roman Catholic priest		Killed by Salvadoran soldiers
20 January 1979	Octavio Ortiz Luna, Roman Catholic priest		
20 June 1979	Rafael Palacios, Roman Catholic priest		
4 August 1979	Alirio Napoleón Macías, Roman Catholic priest		
24 March 1980	Óscar Arnulfo Romero, Archbishop of San Salvador		Killed by right-wing death squad.
27 November 1980	Enrique Álvarez Córdova and five other leaders of the opposition Democratic Revolutionary Front (FDR)		Captured and killed by government aligned security forces.
2 December 1980	Ita Ford, Maura Clarke, Dorothy Kazel, and Jean Donovan, American Roman Catholic nuns		Killed by the National Guard of El Salvador.
13 March 1983	Marianella García Villas, human rights lawyer and activist		Killed by the Salvadoran Armed Forces.
25 May 1983	Albert Schaufelberger, senior U.S. Naval representative		Killed by members of the Central American Revolutionary Workers Party.
23 October 1984	Domingo Monterrosa, commander of the Atlácatl Battalion of the Salvadoran Army, and perpetrator of the El Mozote Massacre		Killed by the Farabundo Martí National Liberation Front (FMLN) along with 13 others using a bomb hidden inside a radio transmitter in the helicopter he was flying in over Joateca in retaliation for massacres committed by the Atlácatl Battalion.
5 April 1989	María Cristina Gómez, teacher and community leader		
16 November 1989	Ignacio Ellacuría, Ignacio Martín-Baró, and Segundo Montes, Roman Catholic Jesuit priests		Killed by Atlácatl Battalion of the Salvadoran Army.

=== Grenada ===
Date	Victim(s)	Assassin(s)	Notes
1983	Maurice Bishop, Prime Minister of Grenada		Both killed along with six other politicians and businessmen in a coup that led to the United States invasion of Grenada a few days later.
1983	Jacqueline Creft, Minister of Education and Women's Affairs and domestic partner of Prime Minister Maurice Bishop		Both killed along with six other politicians and businessmen in a coup that led to the United States invasion of Grenada a few days later.

=== Guatemala ===
Date	Victim(s)	Assassin(s)	Notes
1898	José María Reina Barrios, President of Guatemala		
1957	Carlos Castillo Armas, President of Guatemala		Killed by bodyguard
1968	John Gordon Mein, United States ambassador in Guatemala	FAR	Shot one block from the U.S. embassy in Guatemala City by rebels during a botched kidnapping attempt
1970	Karl von Spreti, West German ambassador in Guatemala	FAR	
1970	César Montenegro Paniagua, communist politician and former congressman		Murdered three days after in retaliation for von Spreti's own murder
1979	Alberto Fuentes Mohr, Social Democratic Party leader		
1979	Manuel Colom Argueta, Mayor of Guatemala City		
1980	Hugo Rolando Melgar Melgar, Law professor at San Carlos University and leftist leader	Efrain Rios Montt regime	Ambushed on his way to work by the Guatemalan Army
1981	Stanley Rother, American Roman Catholic priest		Shot twice in the head by gunmen who forced their way into his rectory in Santiago Atitlán.
1993	Jorge Carpio Nicolle, journalist and founder of the National Centre Union		
April 26, 1998	Juan José Gerardi Conedera, Auxiliary Bishop of the Roman Catholic Archdiocese of Santiago de Guatemala		Beaten to death by Guatemalan soldiers.
2012	Valentín Leal, legislator and former governor of Alta Verapaz		
2013	Carlos Castillo Medrano, Mayor of Jutiapa		

=== Guyana ===
Date	Victim(s)	Assassin(s)	Notes
18 November 1978	Leo Ryan, Member of the US House of Representatives	Members of the Peoples Temple in Jonestown	Shot to death in Guyana while investigating human rights violations by members of the Peoples Temple.
13 June 1980	Walter Rodney, Guyanese historian and political figure		
22 April 2006	Satyadeow Sawh, Agriculture Minister		Murdered along with his brother, sister and a security guard, by masked gunmen dressed in military fatigues.

=== Haiti ===
Date	Victim(s)	Assassin(s)	Notes
17 October 1806	Jean-Jacques Dessalines, Emperor of Haiti		
28 July 1915	Vilbrun Guillaume Sam, President of Haiti		Killed by a mob.
14 July 1963	Clément Barbot, aide to President François Duvalier		Killed after launching a failed coup.
11 September 1993	Antoine Izméry, businessman and Lavalas supporter		
14 October 1993	Guy Malary, minister of justice		
3 April 2000	Jean Dominique, journalist		
14 July 2005	Jacques Roche, journalist		
7 July 2021	Jovenel Moïse, President of Haiti		Killed by Colombian mercenaries posing as US Drug Enforcement Administration agents. See Assassination of Jovenel Moïse

=== Honduras ===
Date	Victim(s)	Assassin(s)	Notes
1862	José Santos Guardiola, President of Honduras		
1966	Maximiliano Hernández Martínez, former President of El Salvador		
2008	Mario Fernando Hernández, deputy speaker of the National Congress for the Liberal Party		
2016	Berta Cáceres, environmental and indigenous rights activist	David Castillo, former military intelligence officer	
2021	Francisco Gaitán, Mayor of Cantarranas	Wilfredo Velásquez	

=== Jamaica ===
Date	Victim(s)	Assassin(s)	Notes
17 April 1987	Carlton Barrett, musician, drummer, and member of The Wailers		Shot by a gunman outside his home in Kingston. Barrett's widow, Albertine Barrett, was subsequently jailed in 1991, after being convicted of conspiracy to commit murder. Sentenced with her were taxi driver Glenroy Carter, her reputed lover, and Junior "Bang" Neil, a mason, who the prosecution alleged was responsible for the actual shooting.
11 September 1987	Peter Tosh, musician, songwriter, and member of The Wailers	Armed gunmen led by Dennis "Leppo" Lobban	Shot twice in the head after being held hostage and tortured for hours during an armed robbery attempt at his home in Kingston. Killed alongside herbalist Wilton "Doc" Brown and disc jockey Jeff 'Free I' Dixon. Several others in the house were wounded, including Tosh's common law wife Andrea Marlene Brown, Free I's wife Yvonne ("Joy"), Tosh's drummer Carlton "Santa" Davis, and musician Michael Robinson.
2 June 1999	Junior Braithwaite, musician, singer, and member of The Wailers		Shot and killed along with fellow musician Lawrence Scott in Kingston.

=== Mexico ===
Date	Victim(s)	Assassin(s)	Notes
29 June 1520	Motecuhzoma II Xocoyotl, Emperor of the Aztec Alliance		
14 February 1831	Vicente Guerrero, former President of Mexico		Lured, captured, and executed by firing squad in a plot orchestrated by conservative political rivals in Cuilapan, Oaxaca.
3 June 1861	Melchor Ocampo, lawyer, scientist, and Liberal reformer		Abducted from his hacienda in Michoacán by conservative guerrillas on orders from either Leonardo Márquez or Félix María Zuloaga or both (reports differ). Ocampo was executed by firing squad at the Hacienda of Tlaltengo, Tepeji del Río, in what is today the state of Hidalgo.
13 November 1863	Ignacio Comonfort, former President of Mexico and Secretary of War and Navy		Ambushed and killed by conservative guerillas during the Second French Intervention in Mexico near Chamacueros, Guanajuato (present-day Comonfort).
18 August 1868	José María Patoni, Liberal general and former governor of Durango	Officers under General Benigno Canto	
10 November 1889	Ramon Corona, Liberal general and Governor of Jalisco	Ron Salcedo	Stabbed several times by Salcedo in Guadalajara and died the next day. Salcedo was later killed by local police.
22 February 1913	Francisco I. Madero, President of Mexico		Killed in a coup along with Vice-president José María Pino Suárez. See Ten Tragic Days.
7 March 1913	Abraham González, revolutionary, governor of Chihuahua and mentor to Pancho Villa	Officers under President Victoriano Huerta	
7 October 1913	Belisario Dominguez, Senator of the Congress of the Union for Chiapas	Officers under President Victoriano Huerta	Abducted and shot in Mexico City under orders from Huerta after giving a memorable speech in the Senate denouncing him.
10 April 1919	Emiliano Zapata, revolutionary	Officers under Colonel Jesús Guajardo	Shot at Hacienda de San Juan in Chinameca, Morelos
20 May 1920	Venustiano Carranza, President of Mexico		Killed in a revolt led by Álvaro Obregón
20 July 1923	Francisco "Pancho" Villa, revolutionary	Unknown, most likely attributed to a plot orchestrated by future President Plutarco Elías Calles with tacit support and approval of then-president Álvaro Obregón	Shot while being driven in an open car at Parral, Chihuahua. His bodyguards Rafael Madreno and Claro Huertado were also killed.
3 January 1924	Felipe Carrillo Puerto, Governor of Yucatán		Murdered as part of a plot by rogue army officers as part of a larger rebellion waged by former interim president Adolfo de la Huerta beginning the previous year. Executed by firing squad alongside three of his brothers, Wilfrido, Benjamín, and Edesio, and eight of their friends in Mérida, Yucatán.
10 June 1924	Salvador Alvarado, revolutionary and former governor of Yucatán		Killed in an ambush near Palenque, Chiapas in retaliation for supporting the rebellion of Adolfo de la Huerta against then-President Alvaro Obregon
17 July 1928	Álvaro Obregón, President-elect	José de León Toral	Killed by a pro-Catholic sympathizer as part of the Cristero War
10 January 1929	Julio Antonio Mella, Cuban revolutionary	Unknown	
11 April 1938	José Antonio Urquiza, political activist and co-founder of the National Synarchist Union	Isidro Parra	Stabbed twice by Parra, a farmer employed under him, while on a visit to Apaseo el Grande, Guanajuato to settle a land dispute
20 August 1940	Leon Trotsky, exiled Russian communist leader	Ramón Mercader, an agent of the NKVD posing as a journalist	Killed by penetrating head injury from an ice axe in his residence in Coyoacan, Mexico City.
23 May 1962	Rubén Jaramillo, revolutionary, politician, and agrarian rights activist		Killed by Federal Judicial Police officers and soldiers raiding his home in an extrajudicial operation near Xochicalco, Miacatlán, Morelos. His wife, Epifanía, three stepsons, were subsequently taken and shot on the premises; the only surviving member of the family was a stepdaughter.
17 September 1973	Eugenio Garza Sada, business magnate, philanthropist, and founder of the Monterrey Institute of Technology and Higher Education (ITESM)		Killed on his morning commute to work in a failed kidnapping for ransom attempt organized by Liga Comunista 23 de Septiembre militants in his hometown of Monterrey. Garza's driver and assistant were also killed, as was Garza as he reached for his pistol. Two of the militants were also killed, identified as Javier Rodríguez Torres and Hilario Juarez García.
3 June 1974	Octavio Muciño, footballer	Jaime Antonio Muldoon Barreto	Shot at a Guadalajara restaurant after a physical altercation. Muldoon Barreto then fled to Spain and was never charged upon his return to Mexico in 1980, which was widely attributed to the influence and power possessed by the Muldoon Barreto family within the Mexican government.
30 May 1984	Manuel Buendía, journalist and political columnist		Suspected that figures within the PRI wanted him killed.
9 February 1985	Enrique Camarena, U.S. Drug Enforcement Administration Agent		Abducted and killed by the Guadalajara Cartel with the assistance of figures within the Mexican government and law enforcement agencies
7 February 1986	Carlos Loret de Mola Mediz, journalist and former Governor of Yucatán		
20 April 1988	Héctor Félix Miranda, journalist and columnist for the Tijuana-based Zeta magazine		Shot on his way to work in Tijuana by a gunman after being pursued and cut off from traffic by a car in front. Speculation rests on prominent businessman Jorge Hank Rhon being the prime suspect and mastermind behind Félix Miranda's murder. This is supported by the fact that two of the assailants, Victoriano Medina Moreno and Antonio Vera Palestina, who confessed to taking part in the murder, were bodyguards who worked at Rhon's Agua Caliente Racetrack. Félix Miranda's humoristic and provocative style covering corruption and drug trafficking had earned him death threats and personal enemies in past years, including Hank Rhon.
16 May 1992	Chalino Sánchez, singer-songwriter		Executed on a farm in Culiacán, Sinaloa by two men posing as police officers hours after he had received a death threat via a note live on stage. The two men are believed to have been associated with the local cartel.
24 May 1993	Juan Jesús Posadas Ocampo, Roman Catholic Cardinal of Guadalajara	Sinaloa Cartel boss, Joaquín "El Chapo" Guzmán, may have also been involved.	Shot at Guadalajara Airport, along with 6 other people, by the Tijuana Cartel using the San Diego-based Logan Heights Gang, either after his car was misidentified as belonging to the Sinaloa cartel or to silence Posadas regarding his denunciation of possible connections between government and drug cartels; some recent speculation that an anti-church group was involved.
23 March 1994	Luis Donaldo Colosio, Presidential candidate of the Partido Revolucionario Institucional	Mario Aburto	Assassinated at a campaign rally in the Lomas Taurinas neighborhood of Tijuana.
28 September 1994	José Francisco Ruiz Massieu, Secretary-General of the Partido Revolucionario Institucional	Daniel Aguilar Treviño	Shot while leaving a PRI party meeting in Mexico City. PRI deputy Fernando Rodríguez González confessed to authorities that he hired Aguilar Treviño and his cousin to commit the murder. Aguilar Treviño confessed that he was paid US$500,000 (equivalent to that of $1,038,026.32 in 2023) by Rodríguez González himself to commit the crime.
7 June 1999	Paco Stanley, comedian	Luis Alberto Salazar Vega	
19 October 2001	Digna Ochoa, human rights lawyer		
22 June 2004	Francisco Ortiz Franco, contributing editor to Zeta Magazine		Shot three or four times at the wheel of his car by masked gunmen in a drive-by shooting in full view of his son and daughter as he left a medical clinic in Tijuana.
25 November 2006	Valentín Elizalde, banda singer	Gunmen led by Raúl Hernández Barrón	Ambushed and killed by gunmen by Hernández Barrón after leaving a concert in Reynosa, Tamaulipas along with his chauffeur and assistant. It is widely believed that Elizalde was killed for his concert performances of the corrido, "A Mis Enemigos", which contains lyrics believed to antagonize drug trafficking gang Los Zetas. Hernández Barrón was later killed in a shootout with Mexican Federal Police in Reynosa on July 26, 2014 alongside several cartel members.
8 May 2008	Édgar Eusebio Millán Gómez, Commissioner of the Federal Preventive Police	Alejandro Ramírez Báez	Murdered after arriving at his home in Mexico City by being shot at eight times in the chest and once in the hand on behalf of the Beltrán-Leyva Organization in retaliation for the arrest of co-founder Alfredo Beltrán Leyva.
19 June 2010	Jesús Manuel Lara Rodríguez, Mayor of Guadalupe, Chihuahua		
28 June 2010	Rodolfo Torre Cantú, former member of the Chamber of Deputies and gubernatorial candidate in Tamaulipas		He was shot and killed along with six in his entourage in Ciudad Victoria.
2 September 2011	Samuel Flores Borrego, drug lord and high-ranking lieutenant of the Gulf Cartel	Members of Los Rojos faction of the Gulf Cartel	Found dead alongside police officer Eloy Lerma García inside a Ford Lobo truck on the highway between Reynosa and Monterrey. Presumably murdered on orders of both Juan Mejía González and Rafael Cárdenas Vela of Los Rojos against the backdrop of infighting in the Gulf Cartel as they were engaged against the Flores Borrego-led Los Metros.
19 January 2012	Mario Arturo Acosta Chaparro, former Mexican Army general and convicted drug trafficker	Jonathan Javier Arechega Zarazúa	Approached by a lone gunman who him and shot him three times in the head after Acosta had arrived at an auto shop to drop off his car. On 4 June 2012, a man allegedly named Jonathan Javier Arechega Zarazúa was detained in connection with the assassination of Acosta Chaparro. He was sentenced to 50 years in prison in January 2013. No clear motive was stated, but may be linked to either his involvement in drug trafficking with the Gulf Cartel (which he was convicted of in 2000 and later released in 2007), or his alleged involvement in torture and homicide of political dissidents in the Mexican Dirty War during the 1970s. Acosta had previously survived an attempt on his life in 2010.
14 September 2012	Eduardo Castro Luque, businessman and deputy-elect to the Chamber of Deputies		
16 September 2012	Jaime Serrano Cedillo, former member of the Chamber of Deputies		Stabbed in the chest with a knife by his wife during an argument that morning. Taken to a nearby hospital by his family where he was later pronounced dead.
12 November 2012	María Santos Gorrostieta Salazar, physician and former mayor of Tiquicheo, Michoacán.		Kidnapped by armed gunmen while driving her daughter to school in Morelia, Michoacán on the 12 November. Gorrostieta Salazar pleaded with her abductors to let her daughter go unharmed, and then agreed to go with the kidnappers. On 15 November, police identified the body after farm workers from the rural community of San Juan Tararameo in Cuitzeo found the corpse on their way to work. Post-mortem reports indicated that she died of a traumatic brain injury, the result of severe blows to the head. She had previously survived three attempts on her life, one of which took the life of her husband José Sánchez Chávez in 2009.
18 October 2013	Francisco Rafael Arellano Félix, drug lord and former leader of the Tijuana Cartel	Unknown, attributed to the Sinaloa Cartel	Shot in the head and several more as he fell by a gunman dressed as a clown while celebrating his 64th birthday in Los Cabos, Baja California Sur. Suspect fled the scene and was never caught. Authorities believe Arellano Félix's murder to have been ordered by the top leadership of the Sinaloa Cartel, and possibly in collaboration with rivals within the Tijuana Cartel.
17 October 2016	Vicente Bermúdez Zacarías, federal judge	Unknown	Killed by a gunman approaching behind him in broad daylight while out on a morning jog in Metepec, State of Mexico. Suspect fled the scene with an accomplice nearby. No clear motive has been established in Bermúdez Zacarías' murder, but may be possibly linked to his role as presiding judge in Joaquín "El Chapo" Guzmán's extradition process, or his complaints against colleagues and court predecessors for judicial irregularities. In October 2019, his ex-wife Marisol Macías Gutiérrez was arrested for allegedly masterminding her ex-husband's murder in a scheme to claim his life insurance plan.
23 March 2017	Miroslava Breach, investigative reporter and journalist for La Jornada and Norte de Juárez		Shot eight times by a gunman in Chihuahua City while driving to take her 14-year-old son to school. Due to the investigative nature of her work on collusion between drug trafficking and local political corruption, her murder had been ordered as a hit to silence her. Police investigation into Breach's murder had determined that the criminal organization "Los Salazares", a division of Gente Nueva, an armed wing of the Sinaloa Cartel, had masterminded the killings. On 25 December 2017, Juan Carlos Moreno Ochoa was captured in Bacobampo, Sinaloa, and in August 2020 sentenced to 50 years in prison for being the intellectual author of Breach's murder.
15 May 2017	Javier Valdez Cárdenas, journalist and founder of Ríodoce		Shot 12 times and killed by unidentified gunmen around noon, blocks away from the Ríodoce offices in Culiacán, Sinaloa.
5 February 2018	Pamela Montenegro, activist and YouTuber	Unknown group of armed men	Shot in her restaurant while working a night shift by a group of unknown armed men likely related to the cartel, due to her activism against the cartel's influence in Mexico.
8 June 2018	Fernando Purón Johnston, former mayor of Piedras Negras, Coahuila		Shot while leaving a debate hall while running for Mexico's general election.
20 February 2019	Samir Flores Soberanes, activist, community leader, and community radio host		Murdered outside his home in Amilcingo, Temoac, Morelos by three unidentified individuals the day after he confronted government officials about federal infrastructure projects in his home state.
31 July 2019	Martín "El 53" Arzola Ortega, drug trafficker and co-founder of Jalisco New Generation Cartel	Bryan Alexander "N"	Shot by two assailants while eating with his aunt and nephew in a Carl's Jr. restaurant in Zapopan. One fled while the other engaged in a shootout with his security detail and was killed. The teenage hitman killed was later identified as Bryan Alexander "N", acting on orders of a rival group.
13 January 2020	Homero Gómez González, environmental activist, agricultural engineer, and manager of the El Rosario Butterfly Reserve		Last seen alive on 13 January attending a meeting in the village of El Soldado, Michoacán. His family reported him missing the next day, and received phone calls from individuals claiming to have kidnapped him demanding ransom payments, which they paid. More than two weeks after his disappearance, on 30 January, his body was found in an agricultural reservoir in Ocampo, with an autopsy later revealing a head injury before drowning. Because of his work combating illegal logging, and because Raúl Hernández Romero—another activist connected to the butterfly sanctuary—was also found dead a few days later, it has been speculated that he was targeted by organized criminals.
10 March 2020	Erik Juárez Blanquet, Mexican state deputy serving in Congress	Unnamed gunmen	Shot by two assailants while in the passengers seat of his car.
15 May 2020	José Rodrigo Aréchiga Gamboa ("El Chino Ántrax"), drug trafficker, hitman, high-ranking member of the Sinaloa Cartel, and founder and leader of their Los Ántrax enforcer unit		Reported missing after fleeing house arrest in the United States on 9 May. Later, on 14 May, Aréchiga Gamboa, his sister, and her husband, were kidnapped after a firefight with a Sinaloa Cartel hit squad, and their bodies then being found murdered in an SUV the next day by police in the town of Ayuné, Culiacán, most likely having been ordered by senior rivals within the Sinaloa Cartel.
18 December 2020	Aristóteles Sandoval, former governor of Jalisco	Saúl Alejandro Rincón Godoy (El Chopa), was later gunned down by Mexican military forces nearby.	Gunned down while having dinner at a local restaurant in Puerto Vallarta.
13 May 2021	Abel Murrieta Gutiérrez, lawyer, former congressman, and former attorney general of Sonora	Unknown, attributed to Caborca Cartel	Shot and killed while standing on a street corner in Ciudad Obregón distributing flyers for his campaign for the municipal presidency. A female campaign worker was also injured. The attack was attributed to the Caborca Cartel, the same group that had carried out the massacre on Murrieta's clients, the LeBarón family, in 2019.
29 June 2023	Hipólito Mora, farmer, politician, and vigilante self-defense group leader	Unknown gunman	Ambushed and shot at by unidentified gunmen in La Ruana, Buenavista, Michoacán along with three of his bodyguards.
13 November 2023	Ociel Baena, activist for non-binary and LGBT+ rights, electoral magistrate at the State Electoral Court of Aguascalientes, and first non-binary magistrate in Latin America	Unknown	Found dead, along with Baena's partner, Dorian Daniel Nieves Herrera, in their home by Baena's housekeeper with razor-blade wounds. The state prosecution service said it suspected Herrera killed Baena before taking his own life; their families, however, rejected that hypothesis. They pointed out that Baena had denounced death threats a few months earlier, when their friend and LGBT+ activist Ulises Salvador Nava was also murdered in the same city, and historically Mexican police had tended to haphazardly dismiss homophobic crimes as "crimes of passion".
21 December 2023	Ricardo Taja Ramírez, aspiring Federal Deputy	Unknown gunman	Shot and killed at a pozolería in Acapulco.
9 January 2024	Aronia Wilson Tambo, indigenous leader and activist	Jorge Santiago	Shot and killed at her home.
1 April 2024	Gisela Gaytán, lawyer and aspiring mayor of Celaya.	Unknown gunman	Shot and killed at her first campaign rally in the town.
22 July 2024	Milton Morales Figueroa, General Coordinator for the Tactical Strategy and Special Operations Unit of Mexico City police.	"Cartel hitmen"	Shot twice in the head by hitmen who pulled up in an SUV outside of a chicken shop in Coacalco de Berriozábal, State of Mexico while out with his family. Pending Investigation.
25 July 2024	Héctor Melesio Cuén Ojeda, academic, businessman, former rector of the Autonomous University of Sinaloa, former mayor of Culiacán, and deputy-elect		Shot in his vehicle and subsequently died of his wounds at a private hospital in Culiacán. However, it has been alleged his killing is tied to the kidnapping and arrest of Ismael "El Mayo" Zambada that same day, whom alleged in a letter that he had arranged a meeting with Cuén and Sinaloa governor Rubén Rocha Moya in order to settle a power dispute before being kidnapped by Joaquín Guzmán López and flown to the United States, where they were subsequently arrested. He also alleged that Cuén was instead shot at the meeting place where the said meeting was due to occur. The investigation by the Attorney General's Office of Sinaloa has been marred by irregularities and accusations of a cover-up. Pending investigation.
9 December 2024	Benito Aguas Atlahua, member of the Chamber of Deputies, and former mayor of Zongolica, Veracruz		Shot at by an individual on a motorcycle while eating lunch with his siblings in the town of Tepenacaxtla, municipality of Zongolica. A second person, a friend of the politician, was killed in the attack.
1 November 2025	Carlos Manzo, municipal president of Uruapan, Michoacán	Víctor Manuel Ubaldo Vidales, acting on orders of the Jalisco New Generation Cartel	Shot seven times during a Day of the Dead festival by 17-year-old Ubaldo approaching him in a white hoodie. Ubadlo was subsequently killed by Manzo's security detail while resisting arrest. Two fellow assailants who accompanied Ubaldo were later found dead on 14 November on the highway between Uruapan and Paracho.
6 February 2026	Santiago Gallón, Colombian businessman, convicted drug trafficker, and chief suspect in the murder of footballer Andrés Escobar	Unknown	Shot and killed by unknown assailants while dining in a restaurant in Huixquilucan, State of Mexico. Pending investigation.
7 July 2026	Benjamín Medrano Quezada, former municipal president of Fresnillo, Zacatecas and former member of the Chamber of Deputies	Unknown	Shot and killed by unknown assailants in an ice cream shop in Guadalajara. Pending investigation.
22 July 2026	Valentín Lavín Romero, Mayor of Temoac		Shot and killed in Temoac town hall.
1 September 2026	Jonathan Meléndez, musician, producer, and keyboardist for synthpop and indie rock group Camilo Séptimo	Gerardo Cisneros Bejarano and Diego Sebastián Rosen	Murdered after being held hostage for hours allegedly by Cisneros and Sebastián in an attempt to gain $2 million pesos worth of BitCoin in a cold wallet. Sebastián was shot alongside his pregnant wife Ana Paula Barragán, their three-year-old daughter, their nanny Aleyda Romero, and the family dog. The couple's six-year-old son was found unharmed hiding under a bed, being the only survivor. Cisneros and Sebastián were subsequently arrested two days later after their alleged involvement in the murders. Pending investigation.

=== Nicaragua ===
Date	Victim(s)	Assassin(s)	Notes
21 February 1934	Augusto César Sandino, Nicaraguan revolutionary	National Guard members led by Anastasio Somoza García	
21 September 1956	Anastasio Somoza García, President of Nicaragua	Rigoberto López Pérez	
10 January 1978	Pedro Joaquín Chamorro Cardenal, newspaper editor and anti-Somoza opposition leader		
20 June 1979	Bill Stewart, American journalist with ABC News		Taken from the van he was travelling and murdered by National Guard troops along with his interpreter Juan Francisco Espinoza while covering the fall of Managua.
16 February 1991	Enrique Bermúdez, founder and former commander of the Contras		

=== Panama ===
Date	Victim(s)	Assassin(s)	Notes
2 January 1955	José Antonio Remón Cantera, President of Panama		Killed at racetrack by machine gun
31 July 1981	Omar Efraín Torrijos Herrera, Maximum Leader of the Revolution and de facto leader of Panama	Alleged to be the United States by Manuel Noriega and his attorney	Likely killed in an aircraft accident by a radio detonated bomb –– but not confirmed. Much speculation has existed surrounding this incident, and few confirmed sources.
13 September 1985	Hugo Spadafora, guerrilla fighter and political activist	Manuel Noriega (suspected)	

=== Paraguay ===
Date	Victim(s)	Assassin(s)	Notes
12 April 1877	Juan Bautista Gill, President of Paraguay		Killed in a plot instigated by Juan Silvano Godoi
29 October 1877	Facundo Machaín, former President of Paraguay		Murdered by prison guards on orders from future presidents Cándido Bareiro and Bernardino Caballero, likely in retaliation to publicly defend those at trial who killed President Gill
31 December 1878	Cirilo Antonio Rivarola, former president of Paraguay		
17 September 1980	Anastasio Somoza Debayle, exiled former president of Nicaragua	7 Sandinistas	
23 March 1999	Luis María Argaña, vice president of Paraguay		Ambushed

=== Peru ===
Date	Victim(s)	Assassin(s)	Notes
26 June 1541	Francisco Pizarro, Spanish conquistador		Killed in a power struggle between fellow conquistadores
23 November 1871	Mariano Melgarejo, exiled former President of Bolivia		
26 July 1872	Jose Balta, President of Peru		Ordered shot by Tomás Gutiérrez in retaliation for his brother's death
26 July 1872	Tomás Gutiérrez, interim President of Peru		Killed by a mob
2 February 1873	Mariano Herencia Zevallos, former interim President of Peru		
16 November 1878	Manuel Pardo, former president of Peru and president of the Peruvian Senate		
30 April 1933	Luis M. Sánchez Cerro, president of Peru	Abelardo de Mendoza	Shot by a member of the suppressed American Popular Revolutionary Alliance. See Assassination of Luis Miguel Sánchez Cerro.
15 February 1992	María Elena Moyano, a community organizer in Villa El Salvador		
29 September 2023	Quinto Inuma Alvarado, tribal leader and conservationist	Genix Saboya Saboya, Belustiano Saboya Pisco, and one other, hired by Segundo Villalobos Guevara	
19 September 2026	Susy Aponte, Peruvian journalist and politician	A unnamed Venezuelan national.	

=== Suriname ===
Date	Victim(s)	Assassin(s)	Notes
8 December 1982	Bram Behr, journalist		Victims of the December murders
8 December 1982	Eddy Hoost, former Minister of Justice and Police		Victims of the December murders
8 December 1982	André Kamperveen, athlete and former minister		Victims of the December murders
8 December 1982	Gerard Leckie, academic		Victims of the December murders
8 December 1982	Surendre Rambocus, military officer		Victims of the December murders

=== Trinidad and Tobago ===
Date	Victim(s)	Assassin(s)	Notes
1 December 1699	José de León y Echales, Spanish governor of Trinidad		Killed during the Arena Massacre
1 August 1990	Leo Des Vignes, MP		Killed during the Jamaat al Muslimeen coup attempt
10 June 1995	Selwyn Richardson, former Attorney-General		
4 May 2014	Dana Seetahal, senator		

=== United States ===
Date	Victim(s)	Assassin(s)	Notes
8 May 1815	David Ramsay, Delegate of the United States Continental Congress	William Linnen	Shot on Broad Street in Charleston, South Carolina with a Horseman's Pistol.
7 November 1837	Elijah Parish Lovejoy, minister, editor, and abolitionist	Angry mob	Killed by a pro-slavery mob.
22 June 1839	Major Ridge, Cherokee leader	Bird Doublehead and James Foreman	Killed by a group of people who blamed Ridge, who signed the Treaty of New Echota, for the deaths of 4,000 Cherokees on the Trail of Tears. His son, John, and his nephew, Elias Boudinot, were also killed.
27 June 1844	Joseph Smith, founder of The Church of Jesus Christ Of Latter Day Saints and 1844 presidential candidate	Armed mob	Armed mob killed him and his brother, Hyrum, at the Carthage, Illinois, jail.
14 April 1865	Abraham Lincoln, President of the United States	John Wilkes Booth	Was shot while watching the play Our American Cousin in the presidential box at Ford's Theater in Washington D.C. Lincoln died the next morning on 15 April across the street in a boarding house. Booth and accomplice David Herold hid in a barn in Virginia. Herold surrendered. When Booth refused to go out, the troops set the barn on fire. Booth remained inside the barn but was fatally shot in the neck by Union soldier Boston Corbett.
23 April 1865	Silas Soule, US provost marshal and whistleblower of the Sand Creek Massacre	Charles Squier	Was shot by a soldier in Denver City, Colorado Territory, who had been under the command of John Chivington, about whom Soule had testified two months beforehand in a federal investigation of Chivington's actions at Sand Creek. Soule had been the target of at least two prior assassination attempts, and told a friend that he expected to be killed due to his testimony.
31 March 1868	George Washington Ashburn, US senate candidate and judge	Five members of the Ku Klux Klan	Assassinated in Columbus, Georgia for his pro-African-American actions. First murder victim of the Klan in state.
22 October 1868	James M. Hinds, U.S. Representative from Arkansas	George Clark	Killed by a Ku Klux Klan member as part of intimidation of Republicans.
2 July 1881	James A. Garfield, President of the United States	Charles J. Guiteau	Shot by Guiteau while waiting for a train at a Washington train station. Garfield did not die until September 19, 1881.
18 March 1882	Morgan Earp, Sheriff	Pete Spence (accused)	Shot while playing billiards at the Campbell & Hatch Billiard Parlor in Tombstone, Arizona by Cowboys in retaliation for the Earp Brothers' killings of previous Outlaws.
29 January 1889	John M. Clayton, U.S. Representative from Arkansas	Unknown	Shot through his window at his home in Plumerville, Arkansas.
15 October 1890	David Hennessy, New Orleans Police Chief	Mafiosi	
28 October 1893	Carter Harrison III, Mayor of Chicago	Patrick Eugene Prendergast	Killed after assailant was rejected for appointment to a patronage position. Assailant was convicted and executed.
3 February 1900	William Goebel, Governor of Kentucky	Unknown political opponents	Uncertain, but killed in the context of a disputed, fraudulent election.
6 September 1901	William McKinley, President of the United States	Leon Czolgosz	Czolgosz shot McKinley while he was shaking hands at the Pan-American Exposition in Buffalo, New York. Died on September 14.
24 April 1905	John M. Pinckney, U.S. Representative from Texas	Unknown	Shot and killed during a confrontation at a prohibition meeting in Hempstead, Texas after being targeted due to his stance on alcohol laws.
30 December 1905	Frank Steunenberg, former Governor of Idaho	Harry Orchard	Killed by a mining company informant in an attempt to cast blame on a labor union.
29 February 1908	Pat Garrett, Old West lawman, customs agent	Jesse Wayne Brazel (suspected)	Shot while traveling from Las Cruces, New Mexico.
1 August 1921	Sid Hatfield, Police Chief of Matewan, West Virginia	Baldwin-Felts agents	Shot and killed on the McDowell County Courthouse steps for his pro-labor actions and involvement in the Battle of Matewan.
15 February 1933	Anton Cermak, Mayor of Chicago	Giuseppe Zangara	Shot struck Cermak instead of intended target President-elect Franklin Roosevelt. Cermak died on 6 March 1933.
8 September 1935	Huey Long, U.S. Senator from Louisiana and a potential 1936 U.S. presidential candidate	Carl Weiss	Shot with a handgun in the abdomen after attending a meeting at the State Capital building to help pass "House Bill Number One" by the son-in-law of Long's long-time opponent, Judge Benjamin Henry Pavy, and died two days later. Weiss was shot and killed by Long's bodyguards.
15 November 1939	Louis F. Edwards, mayor of Long Beach, New York	Alvin Dooley	Shot and killed outside his home. By, Alivin Dooley, a former head of the local police union who lost reelection to a candidate the mayor supported.
11 January 1943	Carlo Tresca, anarchist organizer	Carmine Galante (suspected)	A theory at the time was that the suspected assassin was a member of the Mafia, acting on orders from Sicily, while other theories suggested that he was murdered by Italian fascists. Others have theorized that Tresca was eliminated by the NKVD as retribution for criticism of the Stalin regime of the Soviet Union. Vito Genovese, boss of the Genovese crime family, is said to have allegedly ordered the murder of Tresca, with the shooter allegedly being Carmine Galante of the Bonanno crime family.
25 December 1951	Harry T. Moore, NAACP Brevard County chapter founder and president of NAACP's Florida chapter	Ku Klux Klan (suspected)	Killed alongside his wife, civil rights activist Harriette Moore, when a bomb exploded under their home in Mims, Florida. Harry died the day of the bombing and Harriette 9 days later. The assassins were never caught but several KKK members are suspected.
10 December 1958	Krishna Venta, cult leader	Peter Duma Kamenoff and Ralph Muller	Killed in a suicide bombing alongside seven others in Chatsworth, California by two former cultists who accused Venta of mishandling cult funds and being intimate with their wives.
9 February 1960	Adolph Coors III, heir to the Coors Brewing Company	Joseph Corbett, Jr.	Murdered in failed kidnap-for-ransom attempt.
23 April 1963	William Lewis Moore, civil rights activist and Congress of Racial Equality (CORE) member	Unknown	Murdered in Keener, Alabama, during a protest march from Chattanooga, Tennessee to Jackson, Mississippi.
12 June 1963	Medgar Evers, African-American U.S. civil rights activist and leader of the NAACP in Mississippi.	Byron De La Beckwith	Shot by a Ku Klux Klan member, who was convicted in 1994.
22 November 1963	John F. Kennedy, President of the United States	Lee Harvey Oswald	Shot while traveling in a motorcade in Dallas, Texas. Oswald later shot police officer J. D. Tippit in the chest less than an hour later.
24 November 1963	Lee Harvey Oswald, assassin of John F. Kennedy	Jack Ruby	Shot on live television in the basement of the Dallas police department.
21 June 1964	James Chaney, Andrew Goodman & Michael Schwerner, civil rights activists	Ku Klux Klan	Abducted and executed by members of the Ku Klux Klan for their work on the Freedom Summer campaign in an attempt to get African Americans to register to vote in Neshoba County, Mississippi.
21 February 1965	Malcolm X, black Muslim leader	Talmadge Hayer, a member of the Nation of Islam	Killed in a Manhattan banquet room as he began a speech.
10 January 1966	Vernon Dahmer, President of the Forrest County chapter of NAACP	The White Knights of the Ku Klux Klan led by Samuel Bowers	His home in Hattiesburg, Mississippi was fire bombed on the night of January 10, 1966 by the White Knights of the Ku Klux Klan leaving Dahmer severely burnt before ultimately dying from smoke inhalation and severe burns to his lungs.
27 February 1967	Wharlest Jackson, Natchez, Mississippi NAACP treasurer	Unknown (Silver Dollar Group suspected)	Assassinated via car bomb
25 August 1967	George Lincoln Rockwell, leader of the American Nazi Party	John Patler, a former aide	Shot in the chest as he was leaving a laundromat.
4 April 1968	Martin Luther King Jr., U.S. civil rights activist	James Earl Ray	Ray pleaded guilty but later recanted, while a 1999 civil trial convicted restaurant owner Loyd Jowers and 'unknown others', while also noting that 'governmental agencies were parties' to the plot.
5 June 1968	Robert F. Kennedy, U.S. Senator from New York and a leading 1968 Democratic presidential candidate	Sirhan Sirhan	Shot after giving a speech after winning the California primary. Died 26 hours later on 6 June. Sirhan was convicted on 17 April 1969, and less than a week later was sentenced to death. The sentence was commuted to life in prison in 1972 after the California Supreme Court, in its decision in California v. Anderson, invalidated all pending death sentences imposed in California prior to 1972.
13 June 1969	Clarence 13X, religious leader, founder of the Five-Percent Nation	Unknown	Was killed in an ambush while in the lobby of his apartment building in New York City.
4 December 1969	Fred Hampton, deputy chairman of the Black Panther Party	Chicago Police Department, with involvement by the Federal Bureau of Investigation	Killed by the Chicago Police Department in a raid. The status of this as an assassination is somewhat disputed; however many sources see this as an assassination or at least a politically motivated extrajudicial execution, with support from the FBI's COINTELPRO program.
27 January 1973	Mehmet Baydar, Turkish Consul General	Gourgen Yamikian	Killed as revenge for the Armenian Genocide.
27 January 1973	Bahadır Demir, Turkish Consul	Gourgen Yamikian	Killed as revenge for the Armenian Genocide.
1 July 1973	Yosef Alon, Israeli Air Force officer and military attache	Unknown	Shot to death outside his home. The case was never solved.
6 November 1973	Marcus Foster, School District Superintendent in Oakland, CA	The Symbionese Liberation Army	Shot and Killed by members of the Symbionese Liberation Army with cyanide packed bullets.
11 June 1974	William Cann, Union City, California, Police Chief	Leonard Baca	Shot and killed by a sniper as revenge for the recent police killing of Alberto Terrones at a community meeting regarding the killing. Four others were also injured.
30 June 1974	Alberta Williams King, mother of Martin Luther King Jr., and Edward Boykin, church deacon	Marcus Chenault	Killed while her husband was preaching at Ebenezer Baptist Church in Atlanta, Georgia.
15 August 1975	Joseph Tommasi, leader of the National Socialist Liberation Front	Jerry Jones, National Socialist White People's Party member	Shot by Jones in the head during an altercation outside of NSWPP headquarters in El Monte, California. Tommasi had previously been expelled in 1973 by the NSWPP for his views advocating accelerationism and lone-wolf terrorist actions against the U.S. government.
21 September 1976	Orlando Letelier, Chilean ambassador to the United States during the administration of President Salvador Allende	Michael Townley	Killed along with his American assistant, Ronni Moffitt, by a car bomb placed by Chilean DINA agents.
27 November 1978	Harvey Milk, San Francisco Supervisor, first openly gay elected official in the US, and gay rights activist	Dan White, former San Francisco Supervisor who opposed Milk's advocacy	Shot dead by White, who was demanding Moscone reappoint him back to his old job, which Moscone had refused to do.
27 November 1978	George Moscone, mayor of San Francisco	Dan White, former San Francisco Supervisor who opposed Milk's advocacy	Shot dead by White, who was demanding Moscone reappoint him back to his old job, which Moscone had refused to do.
29 May 1979	John H. Wood Jr., District Judge	Charles Harrelson	Shot dead in the parking lot of his townhouse in San Antonio, Texas by Harrelson who was hired by drug dealer Jamiel Chagra.
12 July 1979	Carmine Galante, mafioso and de facto boss of the Bonanno crime family		Shot and killed by three men wearing balaclavas armed with shotguns and handguns just as he finished having lunch at Joe and Mary's American Restaurant in Bushwick, Brooklyn. Murdered alongside loyal Bonanno associate Leonardo Coppola and cousin/owner Giuseppe Turano. Galante's murder was ordered at the behest of the Five Families and The Commission in retaliation for his brazen attempt to take over and corner the narcotics market for himself.
22 July 1980	Ali Akbar Tabatabaei, former Iranian press attache and exile	Dawud Salahuddin	Shot and killed at the front door of his Bethesda, Maryland home by a man disguised as a postman. Salahuddin stated he was paid $5,000 by the Iranians to kill Tabatabaei.
8 December 1980	John Lennon, British musician, member of The Beatles	Mark David Chapman	Shot and killed by a former fan of the Beatles, who grew to resent Lennon due to statements and actions that he perceived as anti-Christian (most prominently Lennon's joke that the Beatles were "more popular than Jesus") and hypocritical. See Murder of John Lennon.
28 January 1982	Kemal Arıkan, Turkish Consul General	Harry Sassounian and Krikor Saliba	Killed due to Turkey's denial of the Armenian Genocide.
4 May 1982	Orhan Gündüz, Honorary Turkish Consul General	Justice Commandos of the Armenian Genocide	Killed in retaliation for the Armenian Genocide.
18 June 1984	Alan Berg, radio talk-show host	Jean Craig, David Lane, Bruce Pierce, and Richard Scutari	Killed by members of the white nationalist group The Order.
15 October 1984	Henry Liu, Taiwanese-American writer	Wu Tun and Tung Kuei-sen	Allegedly killed by Kuomintang agents.
15 August 1985	Tscherim Soobzokov, Circassian spy, politician, SS Obersturmführer, and Nazi fugitive	Robert Manning (suspected)	Received multiple death threats from those claiming to represent the Jewish Defence League, although they denied involvement
11 October 1985	Alex Odeh, Arab anti-discrimination group leader	Irv Rubin, Robert Manning, Andy Green, Keith Fuchs (suspected)	Killed when a bomb exploded in his Santa Ana, California office.
29 April 1986	Alejandro González Malavé, undercover policeman	"Volunteer Organization for the Revolution" agents (claimed responsibility)	Killed in Bayamón, Puerto Rico.
18 July 1989	Rebecca Schaeffer, actress	Robert John Bardo	Shot and killed by an obsessed fan at her home in Fairfax District, Los Angeles who had been stalking her.
22 August 1989	Huey Newton, founder of the Black Panther Party	Tyrone Robinson	Killed by member of the Black Guerrilla Army (BGA).
16 December 1989	Robert Vance, Federal Appeals Judge	Walter Leroy Moody	Moody was convicted in 1991 of sending Judge Vance a mail-bomb as a personal vendetta; however, attorney Daniel Sheehan has claimed Judge Vance was assassinated to influence the outcome of the Iran-Contra litigation Avrignan v. Hull.
18 December 1989	Robert E. Robinson, lawyer, civil rights activist, and city councilmember	Walter Leroy Moody	Targeted via mail bomb for his work with the NAACP.
5 November 1990	Meir David Kahane, Member of the Israeli Knesset, founder of the JDL and the Kach Party, Zionist	El Sayyid Nosair	Killed by an Arab gunman in a Manhattan hotel who was found guilty of conspiracy charges linking him to Sheik Omar Abdel-Rahman, "the blind sheik", Al-Qaeda's point man in the 1993 World Trade Center bombing. Kahane's assassination was Al Qaeda's first act of terror on US soil.
21 May 1991	Ioan P. Culianu, Romanian historian of religion, culture, and ideas	Unknown	Killed at the University of Chicago where he taught at the University of Chicago Divinity School Swift Hall, allegedly due to opposition to his writings.
10 March 1993	David Gunn, abortion provider	Michael F. Griffin	Shot outside his clinic.
29 July 1994	John Britton, physician, abortion provider	Paul Jennings Hill	Shot at his clinic.
10 December 1994	Thomas J. Mosser, Advertising executive at Burson-Marsteller	Ted Kaczynski	Killed by bomb sent to his home, Kaczynski wrote he had sent the bomb because of Mosser's work repairing the public image of Exxon after the Exxon Valdez oil spill.
31 March 1995	Selena Quintanilla-Pérez, singer and songwriter	Yolanda Saldívar	Shot in Corpus Christi, Texas by fan club manager, who was later convicted for the murder
7 September 1996	Tupac Shakur, rapper	Orlando Anderson (suspected) & Duane "Keffe D" Davis (indicted)	Shot in Las Vegas after leaving a boxing match and died six days later.
9 March 1997	Christopher "Notorious B.I.G." Wallace, rapper	Wardell Fouse (suspected)	Shot four times during a drive-by shooting in Los Angeles, California.
15 July 1997	Gianni Versace, Italian fashion designer	Andrew Cunanan	Shot and killed outside his mansion in Miami Beach.
19 October 1998	Tommy Burks, member of the Tennessee Senate	Byron (Low Tax) Looper	Shot and killed on his property in Cookeville, Tennessee by his Republican Party opponent a month before the election.
23 October 1998	Barnett Slepian, physician, abortion provider	James Charles Kopp	Shot in his kitchen.
15 December 2000	Derwin Brown, sheriff-elect of Dekalb County, Georgia	Melvin Walker & David Ramsey	Shot twelve times outside his home. Assassination was ordered by Sidney Dorsey, whom Brown had defeated in the recent sheriff election.
11 October 2001	Thomas Crane Wales, American federal prosecutor and gun control advocate	Unknown	Wales was sitting at a computer in his office in the basement of his home. A gunman avoided the security lights in Wales' backyard and shot him once in the neck and once in the chest through a window. Wales died at a hospital the next day. In 2018, FBI investigators announced they strongly suspected the killing to have been carried out by a paid hitman.
23 July 2003	James E. Davis, member of the New York City Council	Othniel Askew	Shot in the torso while introducing Askew on the balcony of the New York City Hall.
8 December 2004	Dimebag Darrell, musician	Nathan Gale	Shot while performing onstage at the Alrosa Villa Nightclub in Columbus, Ohio.
2 August 2007	Chauncey Bailey, Oakland Tribune journalist	Devaughndre Broussard	Shot on the street in Oakland.
7 February 2008	Mike Swoboda, Mayor of Kirkwood, Missouri	Charles "Cookie" Thornton	See Kirkwood City Council shooting
31 May 2009	George Tiller, physician, abortion provider	Scott Roeder	Shot by anti-abortion extremist as he ushered at his church.
8 January 2011	John Roll, Chief Judge	Jared Lee Loughner	Shot by Loughner along with his main target Gabrielle Giffords in a supermarket parking lot in Casas Adobes, Arizona during the Congress on Your Corner meeting.
17 June 2015	Clementa C. Pinckney, South Carolina Senator	Dylann Roof	Shot and killed by Roof during the Charleston Church Shooting in South Carolina.
10 June 2016	Christina Grimmie, singer	Kevin Loibl	Shot while signing autographs in Orlando, Florida.
18 June 2018	XXXTentacion, rapper and singer	Michael Boatwright, Trayvon Newsome, Dedrick Williams, and Robert Allen	Shot three times after leaving motorcycle dealership in Deerfield Beach, Florida.
30 October 2018	Whitey Bulger, crime boss of the Winter Hill Gang	Fotios Geas, Paul J. DeCologero and Sean McKinnon	Found beaten to death with a padlock-sock and a shiv in his wheelchair after being transferred to the United States Penitentiary, Hazelton, West Virginia.
13 March 2019	Frank Cali, mobster and acting boss of the Gambino crime family	Anthony Comello	Killed outside his home by Comello who had become obsessed with QAnon conspiracy theories, and believed Cali was a member of a "deep state".
23 June 2024	Julio Foolio, rapper and gang member	Isaiah Chance, Sean Gathright, Rashad Murphy, Davion Murphy, and Alicia Andrews	Shot and killed in a gang-related ambush shooting at a hotel parking lot in Tampa, Florida
4 December 2024	Brian Thompson, businessman and CEO of UnitedHealthcare	Luigi Mangione	Shot three times outside the New York Hilton Midtown hotel in Manhattan, New York.
3 April 2025	Arul Carasala, religious leader	Gary Hermesch (suspected)	Shot multiple times outside his home in Seneca, Kansas.
14 June 2025	Melissa Hortman, former Speaker of the Minnesota House of Representatives	Vance Boelter	Boelter shot and killed Hortman and her husband, and injured Minnesota state senator John Hoffman and his wife.
10 September 2025	Charlie Kirk, political activist, Co-founder of Turning Point USA	Tyler Robinson (suspected)	Shot and killed while on stage at Utah Valley University in Orem, Utah during a TPUSA event.

=== Uruguay ===
Date	Victim(s)	Assassin(s)	Notes
19 February 1868	Bernardo P. Berro, former President of Uruguay		
19 February 1868	Venancio Flores, former president of Uruguay		
25 August 1897	Juan Idiarte Borda, President of Uruguay	Avelino Arredondo	Shot by a supporter of José Batlle y Ordóñez
23 February 1965	Herberts Cukurs, Latvian aviator and fugitive war criminal	Mossad	Killed for his role in the Holocaust in Latvia
10 August 1970	Dan Mitrione, U.S. Office of Public Safety advisor	Tupamaros	
15 November 1992	Eugenio Berríos, Chilean chemist who worked for the DINA during the Pinochet dictatorship	Chilean Government	Killed in Uruguay by Chilean secret services for "knowing too much".

=== Venezuela ===
Date	Victim(s)	Assassin(s)	Notes
4 June 1830	Antonio José de Sucre, independence leader		
13 November 1950	Carlos Delgado Chalbaud, President of Venezuela	Rafael Simón Urbina	
13 November 1950	Rafael Simón Urbina, opponent of President Juan Vicente Gómez and assassin of President Carlos Delgado Chalbaud		
21 October 1952	Leonardo Ruiz Pineda, member and one of the founders of Acción Democrática	Dirección de Seguridad Nacional	Assassinated by dictator Marcos Pérez Jiménez's political police
18 November 2004	Danilo Anderson, state prosecutor		
17 May 2011	Wilfred Iván Ojeda, journalist		
2 April 2012	Jesús Aguilarte, governor of Apure		
1 October 2014	Robert Serra, member of the National Assembly		
6 May 2016	Germán Mavare, A New Era politician		
15 January 2018	Óscar Alberto Pérez, Venezuelan rebel leader and Investigator for the Cuerpo de Investigaciones Científicas, Penales y Criminalísticas.	Venezuelan National Guard	
8 October 2018	Fernando Albán, Justice First councilman	Bolivarian Intelligence Service	In May 2021, Nicolás Maduro's Attorney General, Tarek William Saab, admitted that Albán did not commit suicide, as initially reported by government officials, but was killed.
6 March 2019	Alí Domínguez, journalist		
16 October 2019	Edmundo Rada, Popular Will councilman		Special Action Forces officers suspected of the killing.
12 June 2026	Héctor Rusthenford "Niño" Guerrero, drug trafficker and leader of Tren de Aragua		Killed in a joint United States-Venezuela targeted airstrike on his hideout in Bolívar state.

== Oceania ==
=== Australia ===
Date	Victim(s)	Assassin(s)	Notes
12 February 1894	William Paisley, Mayor of Burwood, New South Wales	William Redfearn	Murder-suicide by Redfearn
29 January 1924	Albert Whitford (politician)	Unknown	
23 June 1975	Shirley Finn, brothel keeper, nightclub operator and socialite		Possibly killed in retaliation for being a whistle blower.
4 July 1975	Juanita Nielsen, newspaper publisher, journalist and urban heritage activist		Disappeared. Ruled a murder at a 1983 coronial inquest.
15 July 1977	Donald Mackay, anti-drugs campaigner		Mackay's body was never found.
17 December 1980	Şarık Arıyak, Turkish Consul General	Justice Commandos of the Armenian Genocide	
10 January 1989	Colin Winchester, Assistant Commissioner of the Australian Federal Police		
2 March 1994	Geoffrey Bowen, Senior National Crime Authority investigator	Domenic Perre	Killed by a parcel bomb. Perre was charged with the murder in March 2018.
5 September 1994	John Newman, New South Wales State Member for Cabramatta	Phuong Ngo, local club owner and political opponent	
26 June 1998	Frank Arkell	Mark Valera	

=== New Caledonia ===
Date	Victim(s)	Assassin(s)	Notes
4 May 1989	Jean-Marie Tjibaou, Kanak independence leader	Djubelly Wéa	

=== New Zealand ===
Date	Victim(s)	Assassin(s)	Notes
5 February 1962	James Patrick Ward, barrister	Unknown	Killed by a parcel bomb. Assailant was never identified.

=== Samoa ===
Date	Victim(s)	Assassin(s)	Notes
16 July 1999	Luagalau Levaula Kamu, Minister of Public Works	Eletise Leafa Vitale, son of the victim's disgraced predecessor Leafa Vitale	
26 may 2024	Caroline Sinavaiana-Gabbard	Playwright Sia Figiel	

=== Palau ===
Date	Victim(s)	Assassin(s)	Notes
30 June 1985	Haruo Remeliik, President of Palau	Unknown	

=== Solomon Islands ===
Date	Victim(s)	Assassin(s)	Notes
18 April 1943	Admiral Isoroku Yamamoto	United States Army Air Forces	
20 August 2002	Augustine Geve, Minister for Youth, Women and Sports	Ronnie Cawa, Francis Lela, Harold Keke	

=== West Papua ===
Date	Victim(s)	Assassin(s)	Notes
26 April 1984	Arnold Ap, songman and ethnomusicologist	Indonesian military	Shot in back by an Indonesian military unit upon release from prison
14 March 1996	Thomas Wainggai, Independence leader		Allegedly poisoned by Indonesian intelligence officers in Cipinang prison.
10 November 2001	Theys Eluay, West Papuan Independence movement leader		Assassinated by Kopassus officers after attending a military dinner in Jayapura
16 December 2009	Kelly Kwalik, West Papuan guerrilla leader	Detachment 88 death squad	Assassinated by Detachment 88 officers in Timika
14 June 2012	Mako Tabuni, Chairman of the West Papua National Committee (KNPB)		Assassinated by Detachment 88 officers in Jayapura

== See also ==
- List of assassinated anticolonialist leaders
- List of assassinations by car bombing
- List of assassinated and executed heads of state and government
- List of assassinated serving ambassadors
- List of Israeli assassinations
- List of Iranian assassinations
- List of people who survived assassination attempts
- List of terrorist incidents
- List of fictional assassins
- List of assassinations by the Assassins
