= James Ward =

James Ward may refer to:

== Military ==
- James Ward (Medal of Honor, 1864) (c. 1833–?), American Civil War sailor
- James Ward (Medal of Honor, 1890) (1854–1901), American Indian Wars soldier
- James Allen Ward (1919–1941), New Zealand pilot and Victoria Cross recipient
- James H. Ward (1806–1861), American Civil War commander
- James R. Ward (1921–1941), U.S. Navy sailor who was awarded the Medal of Honor

== Politics ==
- James Ward (Florida politician) (born 1942), American politician from Florida
- James Ward (frontiersman) (1763–1846), American politician from Kentucky
- James Hugh Ward (1853–1916), American politician from Illinois
- James Kewley Ward (1819–1910), Canadian lumber merchant and politician from Quebec
- Jim Ward (Kansas politician) (born 1957), American politician from Kansas

== Sports ==
=== Football ===
- James Ward (football manager) (born 1972), football manager with Albion Rovers
- Jimmy Ward (footballer, born 1865) (1865–1941), part-time footballer
- Jimmy Ward (footballer, born 1929) (1929–1985), Scottish footballer
- Jim Ward (American football coach) (1948–2001), American football coach
- Jim Ward (quarterback) (born 1944), American football player
- Jamie Ward (born 1986), English footballer
- Jimmie Ward (born 1991), American football player

=== Other sports ===
- James Ward (cricketer) (born 1974), New Zealand cricketer
- Jimmy Ward (ice hockey) (1906–1990), Canadian ice-hockey player
- James Ward (tennis) (born 1987), British tennis player
- Jim Ward (baseball) (1855–1886), Major League Baseball player, 1876
- Jim Ward (sprinter) (born 1946), American sprinter, 1966 All-American for the Stanford Cardinal track and field team

== Entertainment ==
- James Ward (English artist) (1769–1859), English painter and engraver
- James Ward (Irish artist) (1851–1924), Irish artist
- James Ward (writer) (born 1981), English writer, founder of Boring Conference
- James Harvey Ward (born 1978), American actor
- James M. Ward (1951–2024), American game designer and fantasy author
- Jim Ward (body piercer) (born 1941), pioneer in body piercing when he opened The Gauntlet in 1975
- Jim Ward (musician) (born 1976), American rock musician
- Jim Ward (voice actor) (1959–2025), American voice actor who co-hosted The Stephanie Miller Show
- Jimmy Ward (banjo player) (1909–1987), Irish traditional banjo player
- Jamie Ward (actor) Australian actor and former singer

== Other ==
- James Ward (judge) (born 1935), California judge
- James Ward (psychologist) (1843–1925), psychologist and philosopher
- James Ward (priest) (1690–1736), Anglican priest in Ireland
- James A. Ward (1813–1891), American Catholic priest and Jesuit
- James Clifton Ward (1843–1880), English geologist
- James J. Ward (1886–1923), Danish-born American aviator
- James Patrick Ward (died 1962), New Zealand lawyer, victim of the Ward bomb killing
- James Thomas Ward (1820–1897), president of the Wesley Theological Seminary, 1886–1897
