= List of journalists killed in Venezuela =

The following is a list of journalists killed in Venezuela while reporting or on account of their journalism.

== List ==
According to the Committee to Protect Journalists, 31 journalists have been killed in Venezuela since 1992, eight of them after 2002, during the Bolivarian Revolution.

Date	Name	Media outlet
27 November 1992	Virgilio Fernández	El Universal
15 January 1993	María Veronica Tessari	Colombian media
11 April 2002	Jorge Ibraín Tortoza Cruz	2001
1 September 2004	Mauro Marcano	Radio Maturín
5 April 2006	Jorge Aguirre	Cadena Capriles (El Mundo)
23 August 2006	Jesús Rafael Flores Rojas	La Región
2 June 2008	Pierre Fould Gerges	Reporte Diario de la Economía
16 January 2009	Orel Sambrano	ABC de la Semana and Radio América
17 May 2011	Wilfred Iván Ojeda	El Clarín
17-18 August 2020	José Carmelo Bislick Acosta	Omega 94.1 FM
Source: Committee to Protect Journalists

Additionally, journalist Alí Domínguez was murdered in 2019. The Venezuelan police believe his murder was politically motivated.

== See also ==
- Censorship in Venezuela
- Mass media in Venezuela
- List of journalists killed in Guatemala
- List of journalists killed in Honduras
- List of journalists killed in Mexico
