= Natagaima =

Coordinates: 3°35′N 75°05′W

- Municipality and town
- Flag Seal

- Location of the municipality and town of Natagaima in the Tolima Department of Colombia.
- Country: Colombia
- Department: Tolima Department

Government
  - Mayor: Jesús Alberto Manios Urbano

Area
  - Total: 862 km^{2} (333 sq mi)
- Elevation: 326 m (1,070 ft)

Population (2017)
  - Total: 22,455
- Time zone: UTC-5 (Colombia Standard Time)

Natagaima (Spanish pronunciation: [nataˈɣajma]) is a town and municipality in the Tolima department of Colombia, on the shore of the Magdalena River, at 326 meters (1,070 ft) above sea level. The population of the municipality was 21,324 as of the 1993 census, and its average temperature is 26 °C (79 °F). Natagaima was founded in 1606 by Spanish conqueror Juan de Borja y Armendia.

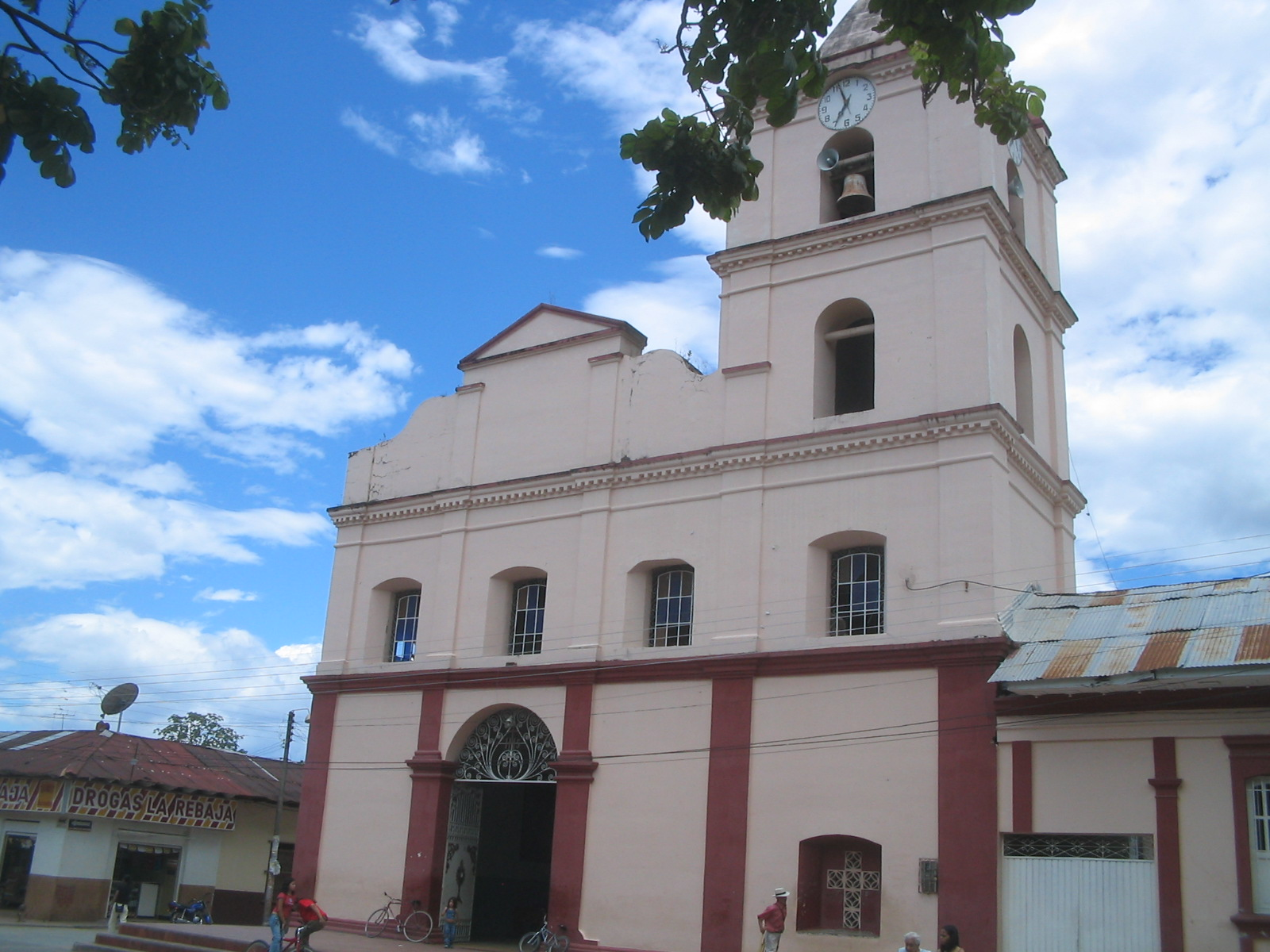
Iglesia de Natagaima

== Etymology ==
Some believe the name of Natagaima comes from the words Nataga ("Cacique", Tribal Chief) and Ima (land), while others state that the name was created because there was an Indian named Nataga, who was the chief of this region, and married Queen Ima, ruler of the Tribal Chiefs of the center of Tolima.

== Limits ==
North: Coyaima and Prado, East: Dolores and Alpujarra, West: Ataco and Coyaima, South: Aipe(Huila). Distance from Ibagué(capital of Tolima): 118 km (73 mi).

== Population and economic activities ==
Approximately 26,600 inhabitants reside in the 862 square kilometers (333 sq mi) of Natagaima. Its economy consists mainly in agriculture, an activity induced by its hot weather. The main agricultural products are rice, cotton, corn and sorghum. Besides agriculture, breeding of livestock occupies an important place in the economy of Natagaima, specially that of the Zebu species.

Other economical activities include craftsmanship and saddlery.

== History ==
The people of Natagaima were submitted by Spanish Conqueror Juan the Borja, who gathered the survivors of this incursion and proceeded with the foundation of the town. It is said that Natagaima lies in a place different from his original location, and was moved there by orders of the priest Ignacio Navarro in 1801. From 1863 to 1866 it was the capital of the Sovereign State of Tolima. Through a law emitted on February 21, 1963, it became a Municipality, starting its role on January 1, 1964.

Its territory was initially inhabited by the Pijao Indians, that were mainly composed by the Natagaima and Coyaima communities, tough warriors who posed fierce resistance to the Spanish invasion, forcing the Spaniards to establish an extermination policy. Other local tribes were the Dujos and Babadujos, who continuously fought against the Natagaimas and Coyaimas, and, motivated by the overwhelming quantity of received attacks, ultimately decided to support the Spaniards.

== Typical foods ==
Tamale (Tolimense), almojábana, yucca bread with oats, Lechona, bizcochuelo, Mistela, Chanfaina, Corn Chicha, Masato, Poporoi are the most important dishes of the zone.

== Typical songs ==
Among many others, La caña(Cantalicio Rojas), El contrabandista and El pasamanos, are famous songs that are danced during the festivities.

== Sites of interest ==
Pacandé Mountain, The Painima Bath Zone, The Patá(la Palmita) Bath Zone, The Anchique River, The Hipogeo Indian Cemetery (vereda Palma Alta), and the Magdalena River crossing.

== Health ==
San Antonio Hospital (a "first level" hospital).

== Education ==
=== Primary ===
- 1 May Urban Mixed School
- Maria Auxiliadora Urban Mixed School
- Gabriel Rebeis Pizarro Urban Mixed School
- Gustavo Perdomo Ávila Urban Mixed School

=== Secondary ===
- Francisco José de Caldas School
- Alfonzo Reyes Echandia School
- Luis Carlos Galan Sarmiento School

=== Rural schools ===
- Rural and Agricultural Development School Anchique
- Policarpa Salavarrieta Basic Education Institute
- La Palmita Rural Mixed School
- New Town Adult Centre
- Mariano Ospina Perez Institute

== Notable persons ==
- Teófilo Forero, politician and trade unionist
- Rafael Godoy, composer
- Cantalicio Rojas
- IndiaMeliyara

== Climate ==
Climate data for Natagaima (Anchique), elevation 415 m (1,362 ft), (1981–2010)
Month	Jan	Feb	Mar	Apr	May	Jun	Jul	Aug	Sep	Oct	Nov	Dec	Year
Mean daily maximum °C (°F)	33.5 (92.3)	33.8 (92.8)	33.2 (91.8)	32.6 (90.7)	33.0 (91.4)	34.3 (93.7)	35.3 (95.5)	36.6 (97.9)	35.8 (96.4)	33.2 (91.8)	31.3 (88.3)	31.6 (88.9)	33.7 (92.7)
Daily mean °C (°F)	27.7 (81.9)	28.1 (82.6)	27.8 (82.0)	27.4 (81.3)	27.5 (81.5)	28.2 (82.8)	29.0 (84.2)	30.0 (86.0)	29.5 (85.1)	27.8 (82.0)	26.7 (80.1)	26.9 (80.4)	28.1 (82.6)
Mean daily minimum °C (°F)	23.0 (73.4)	23.1 (73.6)	23.1 (73.6)	23.1 (73.6)	23.0 (73.4)	23.3 (73.9)	23.6 (74.5)	24.0 (75.2)	23.7 (74.7)	23.0 (73.4)	22.8 (73.0)	22.8 (73.0)	23.2 (73.8)
Average precipitation mm (inches)	100.1 (3.94)	123.8 (4.87)	152.1 (5.99)	181.9 (7.16)	129.7 (5.11)	38.1 (1.50)	42.3 (1.67)	32.4 (1.28)	76.8 (3.02)	212.0 (8.35)	242.4 (9.54)	162.3 (6.39)	1,493.9 (58.81)
Average precipitation days	9	11	13	14	14	9	8	6	8	15	16	13	135
Average relative humidity (%)	73	71	73	75	74	66	60	55	60	70	78	77	69
Mean monthly sunshine hours	229.4	186.3	179.8	174.0	195.3	192.0	210.8	210.8	195.0	195.3	189.0	210.8	2,368.5
Mean daily sunshine hours	7.4	6.6	5.8	5.8	6.3	6.4	6.8	6.8	6.5	6.3	6.3	6.8	6.5
Source: Instituto de Hidrologia Meteorologia y Estudios Ambientales
