= Wilfred Iván Ojeda =

- Died: 17 May 2011; La Victoria, Aragua, Venezuela
- Occupation: Journalist
- Spouse: Milagros Manzano
- Children: Mary Ruth Wildred Adrian

Wilfred Iván Ojeda Peralta (1955 – 17 May 2011) was a Venezuelan journalist and opposition politician. Ojeda wrote a column for El Clarín in La Victoria, Aragua, Venezuela. He regularly challenged the government through his column. He was murdered and his body was found on 17 May 2011.

He is one of eight journalists who have been killed for their work in Venezuela since 2002, according to the database of the Committee to Protect Journalists.

== Career ==
Wilfred Ojeda wrote a regular column, called Dimensión Crítica (English: Critical Dimension) for El Clarin in Venezuela for 22 years, in which he was often critical of the local government.

He was also a leader in the opposition party Acción Democrática in Venezuela. He was involved with the Regional Legislative Assembly under President Jaime Lusinchi and a political secretary in the Ribas Municipality.

Wilfred Ojeda's column often criticized Venezuela and the local government.

== Death ==
Wilfred Ojeda disappeared on 16 May 2011 at the age of 56. His family last saw him when he left home in the morning. His daughter spoke to him by phone later in the day, which was his last contact with his family. He left to sell garlic, which he sold to support his family. Ojeda had asked his daughter to save him some food for when he returned home later in the evening. Ojeda's family suspected that something was wrong when his cell phone was out of range. Around 3:30 a.m. the family made a trip to local hospitals and the police station. They searched and finally, at 6:00 a.m., they were informed that his vehicle was found in a nearby town.

Ojeda's body was found 15 miles away from where his vehicle was located. None of his belongings appeared to be missing. Ojeda, who was found shot in the head, was found with his arms bound, his head hooded and his mouth gagged with tape. Police found traces of blood inside his truck. It was suspected that the murder was a contract killing through a crime organization. His relatives had no knowledge of any enemies or death threats.

Investigators argued that Ojeda was allegedly contractually killed by two brothers because of a debt and the police stated his murder was not connected with his writings. However, the Inter-American Commission on Human Rights (IACHR) of the Organization of American States (OAS) urged officials not to rule out the possibility that his killing had another motive.

== Impact ==
The media in Venezuela had recently been under pressure from different sources, including President Hugo Chávez. Many media outlets had been shut down and others have been restricted leading up to the parliamentary elections. According to the Committee to Protect Journalists, the Chávez government had used prior restraint, punitive media regulations, revocation of broadcasting licenses, suspension of journalists, arrests and even buying media organizations.

== Personal life ==
Wilfred Ojeda is survived by his wife, Milagros Manzano, and his two children.

== See also ==
- List of journalists killed in Venezuela
