= Crispiniano Quiñones Quiñones =

Colombian general

Crispiniano Quiñones Quiñones (born in Aguachica, Cesar, died February 27, 2000) was a Colombian Army General. At the time of his retirement from active duty in 1993, his rank was Brigadier General, and he served as Commander of the 13th Brigade, headquartered in Bogotá. He was assassinated in La Vega, Cundinamarca on February 27, 2000, by members of FARC.

He is largely credited with being one of the founders of the Colombian Army Special Forces, along with then-Captain Ramon E. Niebles Uscategui. Additionally, he was a founding member of the Colombian Army's 1st Mobile Brigade, a corps designed to fight the increasing threat of FARC and other guerrilla groups, and a founding member of the Aviation Brigade of the Colombian Army.

== Military career ==
- Military Aggregate to the French Government, with the rank of colonel
- Commander of the Lancers School in Girardot, Cundinamarca
- Commander of the Army School of Combined Arms (ESACE)
- Commander of the 1st Army Mobile Brigade in 1991, with the rank of colonel
- Commander of the 1st Army Brigade in Tunja, Boyacá, with the rank of Brigadier general.
- Commander of the 13th Army Brigade in Bogotá, with the rank of Brigadier general. This was his last active post.
- Academic Vice-chair of the Nueva Granada Military University in Bogotá until his death.

== Decorations and Distinctions ==
- Paratrooper. Then-Captain Quiñones was required to graduate before he could travel to Fort Bragg, since the IMSO requires all the students to be Airborne. Graduated --
- International Military Student at Fort Bragg. Rank: Captain. Graduated -- -- -- . Upon his return, he developed and expanded the paratrooper courses in the Colombian Army.
- Lancero. It is the equivalent of the US Ranger. Graduated -- -- --

== Assassination and outcome ==
On February 27, 2000, three members of the Teofilo Forero column of FARC, entered a commercial establishment where he was conducting private business and shot him in the head repeatedly. The assassins then escaped and reported to their commander, known as "Geovanni" that the mission in La Vega had been accomplished. The recording was intercepted by units of the National Police of Colombia. "Geovanni" was, according to intelligence reports of the Colombian Army, the commander of the military wing of the 22nd FARC Front, which operated in the region of Rio Negro, northern Cundinamarca

As reported in bulletin 448, dated December 20, 2004 by the office of the Attorney General of Colombia office, the Third Specialized Judge of the Neiva Circuit, sentenced Edgar Antonio Moreno Cuervo, Genry Díaz Ramos, and Oscar Perdomo Sanabria to 40 years in prison and a fine of 80 monthly minimum wages for the assassination.

"Geovanny" was reportedly gunned down by the Colombian Army shortly after the assassination.
