= James Clifton Ward =

James Clifton Ward (1843–15 April 1880) was an English geologist. Ward was a man of a singularly attractive nature; wide in his sympathies and culture, fond of art, though even more happy among beautiful scenery, and an enthusiastic geologist.

== Life ==
Ward was born at Clapham Common on 13 April 1843. His father, James Ward, was a schoolmaster; his mother's maiden name was Mary Ann Morris. Ward entered the Royal School of Mines in 1861, where he won the Edward Forbes medal in 1864.

In 1865, Ward was appointed to the geological survey, and for some time worked in Yorkshire on the millstone, grit, and coal measures near Sheffield, Penistone, and Leeds. In 1869 Ward was transferred to the Lake district, where for the next eight years he surveyed the area around Keswick. In 1877, Ward was transferred to Newcastle to examine the lower carboniferous rocks in that region. That same year, he married Elizabeth Anne Benson from Cockermouth: the couple had two children. At the end of 1878, Ward he retired from the survey. In December 1878, after being ordained as a minister, Ward assumed the curacy of St. John's Church in Keswick. Early in 1880, Ward was appointed vicar of Rydal. Ward died on 15 April of the same year.

Ward was among the first to appreciate the importance of Clifton Sorby's method of using the microscope for the study of the composition and structures of rocks, and applied it to the old lavas and ash-beds of the Lake district. He advocated Sir Andrew Crombie Ramsay's hypothesis of the glacial origin of lake basins, applying it to those in his own district, and put forward views in regard to metamorphism which at that time would find few supporters. But his excellent work in surveying the northern part of the Lake district will always give him a high place among field geologists.

== Works ==
Ward wrote a small manual on natural philosophy (1871), and another on geology (1872), and was the author of the valuable memoir published by the geological survey on the northern part of the Lake district (1876), the map of which was also his work. He was also part author of two survey memoirs on the Yorkshire coalfields. Twenty-three papers appear under his name in the Royal Society's catalogue, the most important of which were published in the 'Quarterly Journal of the Geological Society.' Two of these, in the volumes for 1874 and 1876, deal with the glaciation of the Lake district, and three in 1875 and 1876 with the structure of its rocks and questions of metamorphism. His influence was distinctly stimulative; during his residence at Keswick he often lectured on geology, and took a leading part in founding the Cumberland Association for the Advancement of Literature and Science, together with local societies which were affiliated to it.
