= James Ward (judge) =

American judge (born 1935)

James D. Ward
- Born: September 8, 1935 (age 91); Sioux Falls, South Dakota, U.S.
- Occupations: Justice, California Courts of Appeal, Fourth District, Division Two
- Spouse: Carole J. Ward

James D. Ward (born September 8, 1935) is an associate justice of the California Courts of Appeal, Fourth District, Division Two.

== Biography ==
=== Education ===
James D. Ward was born on September 8, 1935. Between 1953 and 1954, Ward attended classes at both the University of Oslo in Norway and the University of Vienna in Austria. He earned his Bachelor of Arts from the University of South Dakota in 1957. Ward then matriculated at the University of San Francisco, where he earned his J.D. degree in 1959.

=== Legal career ===
On January 9, 1960, Ward was admitted to the California Bar. He was admitted to practice in the U.S. District Court, Southern District of California in 1964. Ward was admitted to practice before U.S. Supreme Court on May 14, 1979. Ward served as a Deputy District Attorney for Riverside County from 1960 to 1961. He became a Superior Court judge in 1993, receiving an appointment from Governor Pete Wilson on November 29, 1993.

== Published works ==
Publications by Ward include:

- "To Catch a Prince" Air California magazine. (January 1978)
- "To Sell a Valentine" The Thoroughbred of California. (July 1978)
- "Destination Cabo" Pacific Skipper magazine. (December 1979)
- "A Girl, A Horse, A Father" Horseplay magazine. (March 1981)
- "An Insider's View of the Civil Discovery Act of 1986," Litigation in Brief. (1986)
- "To the U.S. Supreme Court and Back," Statewide Bench/Bar/Media Newsletter. (July 1987)
- "Commission on Judicial Nominees Evaluation (JNE)," The Legal Secretary. (February 1989)
- Chapter Author, Civil Discovery Practice, California Continuing Education of the Bar (undated)
