= Alberto Manuel Campos =

Alberto Manuel Campos (1919–1975) was an Argentine politician and member of the Peronist Party. He was born in José León Suárez, Buenos Aires and was assassinated on December 17, 1975.

== Death ==
He was mayor of the General San Martín Partido, in the northern area of Greater Buenos Aires between May 25, 1973, and December 17, 1975. He was assassinated in an attack attributed to the armed Montoneros political organization in the town of José León Suárez during the extreme intensification of political violence that marked the last months of the Isabel Perón government. In that same act, the Secretary of the Treasury, Charles Ferrin, the driver carrying them, Santiago Álvarez and a municipal employee, were also killed.

== Work ==
Campos was a member of the Peronist resistance. He published, during times of ideological persecution, the Norte newspaper, a tabloid with strong political content. He was a confidant of Juan Domingo Perón during his exile in Puerta de Hierro, who entrusted him with the task of being his first personal representative. He was connected to the Metal Workers Union and the CGT.

== Recognition ==
The causes, abettors and perpetrators of his murder have never been clearly identified. He was succeeded by Emilio Cuccarese, who served as Mayor until March 24, 1976, when he was removed from office by the National Reorganization Process.

In recognition of his figure, the new building in the Municipality of General San Martin, which was started under his leadership and opened in 1978 in the central 89 street (formerly Uruguay), side of the San Martin Central Plaza, bear his name.
