= Germán Medina Triviño =

Colombian politician (died 2021)

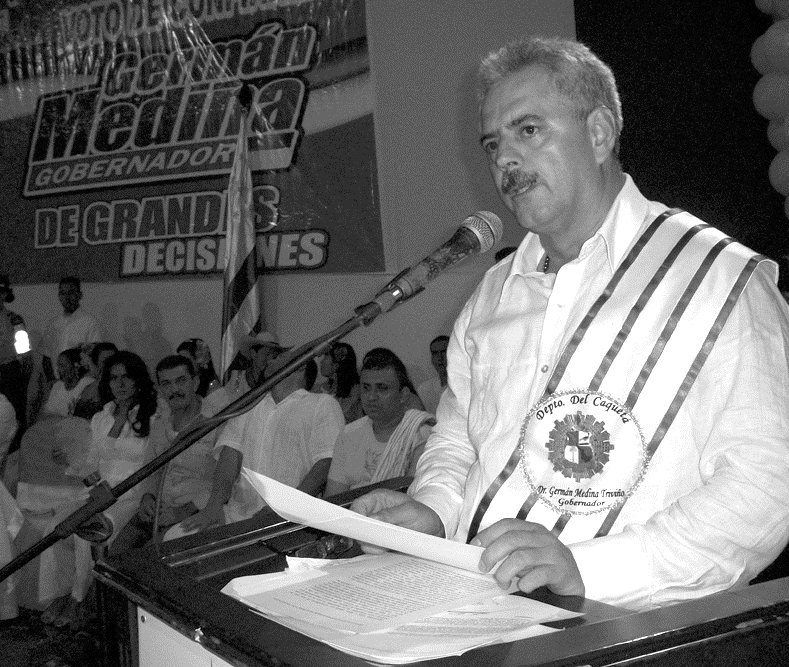

Governor of Caquetá
- In office 25 April 2010 – 31 December 2011
- Preceded by: Luis Francisco Cuéllar; Olga Patricia Vega Cedeño (acting)
- Succeeded by: Víctor Isidro Ramírez

Personal details
- Born: Florencia, Caquetá, Colombia
- Died: 30 March 2021 Florencia, Caquetá, Colombia
- Party: PLC

Germán Medina Triviño (died 30 March 2021) was a Colombian politician. He served as Governor of the Caquetá Department from 2010 to 2011.

== Biography ==
At university, Triviño studied accounting, tax technology, and marketing management. A member of the Colombia Liberal Party, he held several political positions. In 2003, he ran unsuccessfully for Mayor of Florencia.

Accused of having links with paramilitaries in the Huila Department, Triviño was allegedly linked to the 2000 deaths of professors Héctor Manrique Peñuela and Jesús María Cuellar. For these events and alleged links to the United Self-Defense Forces of Colombia, he was imprisoned at Cárcel La Picota in Bogotá in March 2012, but was released due to irregularities in his trial. He denied any allegations of links to paramilitary groups.

From 2008 to 2010, Triviño worked as an assistant for the Chamber of Representatives of Colombia. In 2010, he was Elected as Governor of the Caquetá Department in 2010 after the incumbent Governor Luis Francisco Cuéllar was assassinated by the Revolutionary Armed Forces of Colombia. He received 36,960 total votes with support from the Colombian Conservative Party and the Alternative Democratic Pole. His main rival was Carlos Orlando Cuéllar of the Social Party of National Unity, nephew of the late former Governor.

From 2020 until his death in 2021, Triviño served as an advisor to the Mayor of Florencia, Luis Antonio Ruiz.

Germán Medina Triviño was assassinated on 30 March 2021 while leaving his home in the Torasso sector of Florencia by two hitmen on a motorcycle. A reward of $50 million by authorities was offered for information on the assassins. His murder prompted reactions from several political figures, including Mauricio Gómez Amín, Pablo Catatumbo, and Timoleón Jiménez.
