= James Ward (Medal of Honor, 1890) =

United States Army soldier and Medal of Honor recipient

- Born: 1854; Quincy, MA
- Died: 1901 (aged 46–47); Roxbury, MA
- Burial place: New Cavalry Cemetery
- Military career
- Allegiance: United States
- Branch: United States Army
- Rank: Sergeant
- Unit: 7th Cavalry Regiment
- Conflicts: Indian Wars • Wounded Knee Massacre
- Awards: Medal of Honor

James Ward (1854–1901) was a United States Army soldier in the American Indian Wars and a recipient of the U.S. military's highest decoration, the Medal of Honor, for his actions at the Wounded Knee Massacre.

== Biography ==
James Henry Ward was born in 1854 in Quincy, Massachusetts, as the second of seven children in a family of Irish immigrants. He first enlisted at the age of 22, leaving behind a job as a bricklayer. After enlisting in Boston on August 3, 1876, he was assigned to the 5th Cavalry stationed at Fort Laramie. Ward returned to civilian life in 1881 after five years of 'excellent' service before enlisting again in New York City in 1883, this time with the 7th Cavalry. This second enlistment again ended with an 'excellent' service record, and Ward quickly followed it with a final enlistment in Boston in 1888, this time with the 4th Cavalry.

== Wounded Knee Massacre and Medal of Honor ==
Partway through his third enlistment Ward transferred back to the 7th Cavalry, which was deployed on the Pine Ridge Campaign in South Dakota to suppress followers of the Ghost Dance. On December 28, 1890, 7th Cavalry detained several hundred Lakota near Wounded Knee. American soldiers were sent into the Lakota prisoner camp to disarm tribal warriors the next morning. A small scuffle over a rifle quickly escalated to fighting throughout the camp.

Tasked with taking weapons from the Lakota, Ward was knocked to the ground and then stabbed several times with a knife during the first few moments of fighting. Ward's assailant was killed by another soldier, enabling Ward to survive the initial melee and participate in the massacre. The 7th Cavalry killed at least 200 men, women and children in encounters ranging from hand-to-hand melees to artillery fire.

Along with 19 other soldiers present at the massacre, Ward was awarded a Medal of Honor. Ward's official Medal of Honor citation reads:

Continued to fight after being severely wounded.

== Later life ==
Ward was discharged from the Army before completing his final five-year enlistment and returned to Boston, where he took a job as a steamfitter. Ward married Catherine Harrington in 1894 in Boston and had a son in 1898. Suffering from paralysis, Ward was admitted to the Boston Insane Hospital, where he died two years later in 1901. Ward is buried at New Cavalry Cemetery in Mattapan, a neighborhood in southern Boston.

== Controversy ==
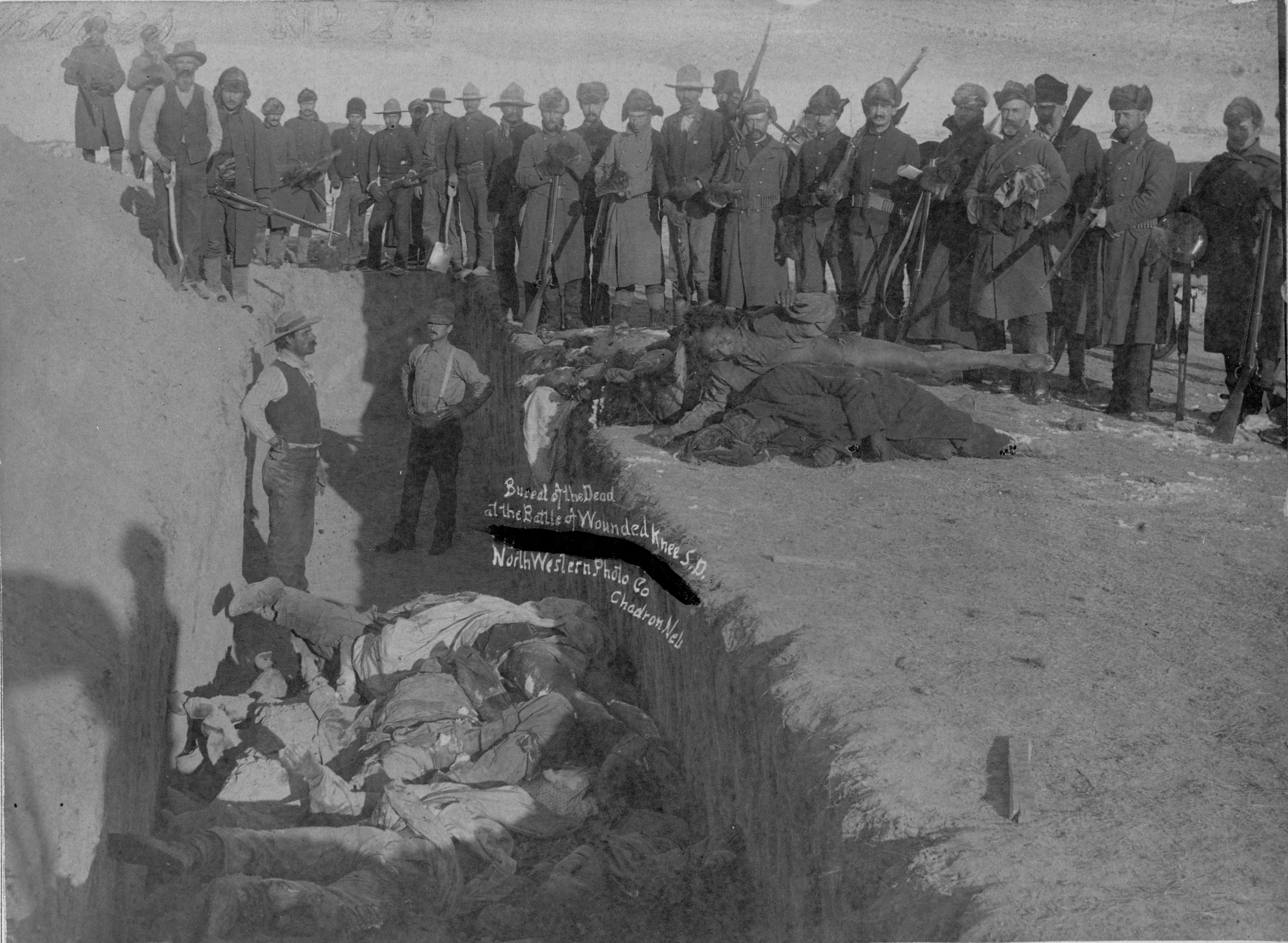
Mass Grave for the Dead Lakota After the Engagement at Wounded Knee

There have been several attempts by various parties to rescind the Medals of Honor awarded in connection with the Wounded Knee Massacre. Proponents claim that the engagement was in-fact a massacre and not a battle, due to the high number of killed and wounded Lakota women and children and the very one-sided casualty counts. Estimates of the Lakota losses indicate 150–300 killed, of which up to 200 were women and children. Additionally, as many as 51 were wounded. In contrast, the 7th Cavalry suffered 25 killed and 39 wounded, many being the result of friendly fire.

Calvin Spotted Elk, direct descendant of Chief Spotted Elk killed at Wounded Knee, launched a petition to rescind medals from the soldiers who participated in the battle.

The Army has also been criticized more generally for the seemingly disproportionate number of Medals of Honor awarded in connection with the battle. For comparison, 19 Medals were awarded at Wounded Knee, 21 at the Battle of Cedar Creek, and 20 at the Battle of Antietam. Respectively, Cedar Creek and Antietam involved 52,712 and 113,000 troops, suffering 8,674 and 22,717 casualties. Wounded Knee, however, involved 610 combatants and resulted in as many as 705 casualties (including non-combatants).

== See also ==
- List of Medal of Honor recipients for the Indian Wars
