= Alí Domínguez =

Venezuelan journalist, student politician, and political party leader

- Born: Alí Ramón Domínguez; 7 March 1992; Monay, Estado Trujillo, Venezuela
- Died: 6 March 2019 (aged 26); Caracas, Venezuela
- Education: Bolivarian University of Venezuela
- Occupations: Journalist, politician

Alí Domínguez ([aˈli ðoˈmiŋɡes]; 7 March 1992 – 6 March 2019) was a Venezuelan journalist, student politician at the Bolivarian University of Venezuela, and political party leader. He was murdered in 2019; police believe his murder was politically motivated.

== Early life ==
Domínguez was one of five siblings, at least one of whom disagreed with his political actions.

He had completed graduation requirements at the Bolivarian University of Venezuela, where he studied Social Communications, but was not allowed to graduate. This is because he reported accounts of the university management that were negative towards the institution.

== Career ==
=== Politics ===
Domínguez had attended the Bolivarian University of Venezuela, which teaches in line with Chavist ideology. He was a supporter of Hugo Chávez, describing himself as a "dissident Chavista", but was critical of Nicolás Maduro. During his time as a student representative he began to speak out against corruption at the university, for which he received death threats. He suffered an attack that was reportedly committed by people hired by university management. At the time of his death he was the leader of the political group Movimiento Amplio Desafío de Todos, a Chavist faction that opposes Maduro, and occasionally participated in anti-Maduro demonstrations.

Dissident Chavists are often the subject of personal violations in Venezuela, with 45 recent cases.

=== Journalism ===
As a journalist, he started investigating corruption of the state. He had been in contact with major political parties in Venezuela in discussion of cases of corruption linked to Maduro.

== Disappearance and murder ==
Domínguez disappeared on 28 February 2019 in Caracas after attending a meeting for volunteers about bringing humanitarian aid into Venezuela, and was found on the side of Francisco Fajardo Freeway on the morning of 1 March 2019. According to missing posters, he was last seen in Los Cortijos. His family were not immediately informed, and had also been turned away by the police when trying to file a missing person's report; they were referred to intelligence services because of the political nature of the case due to Domínguez's positions. They then started a social media campaign with the hashtag "#QueAparezcaAliDominguez" (Hope that Alí Domínguez will appear) on 3 March, also looking for Domínguez in hospitals but being turned away after showing photos. His family became aware of his location on 5 March, to identify his comatose body. Doctors then announced he had been admitted earlier.

He was taken to the Hospital Domingo Luciani on 1 March, where he died early on the morning of 6 March, one day shy of his 27th birthday; his death has been accounted as murder. Police reported that his skull was fractured, his nose and several limbs were broken, and his teeth had been pulled. The police have not named suspects. He was reported to have been receiving more death threats shortly before his disappearance, telling his family and friends to keep fighting for his causes should something happen.

=== Reactions ===
Commenting on the murder, former United States Ambassador to Venezuela Charles Shapiro said that it was "repression" tactics, blaming the government because they "don't know what to do" whilst losing credibility. Carlos Vecchio, the Venezuelan ambassador to the United States appointed by Juan Guaidó's government, said that they "deeply condemn the murder of the journalist Alí Domínguez" and congratulated him for recognizing Maduro's corruption and aligning himself with the opposition despite being chavista. Popular Will, Guaidó's party, called for a "thorough investigation". The Cuerpo de Investigaciones Científicas, Penales y Criminalísticas (CICPC) began an investigation, with family and friends saying it was clearly deliberate and that they were not surprised. Fox News noted that there were over 900 political prisoners in Venezuela, 36 of whom are journalists, asking why only with Domínguez's death were people experiencing "outrage".

== See also ==
- List of journalists killed in Venezuela
