= Teófilo Forero =

Colombian politician and trade unionist (died 1989)

- Born: Teófilo Forero Castro; 10 December 1937; Natagaima, Colombia
- Died: 27 February 1989 (aged 51); Bogotá, Colombia
- Cause of death: Gunshot wound
- Occupations: Worker, trade unionist and politician
- Political party: Patriotic Union (1985–1989)
- Spouse: Leonilde Mora de Forero
- Children: Mario Alexander Forero Mora

Teófilo Forero Castro (died February 27, 1989) was a Colombian politician and trade unionist. A metalworker by profession, Forero became the National Organizing Secretary of the Colombian Communist Party. He also founded the trade union centre Confederación Sindical de Trabajadores de Colombia (CSTC). He was assassinated on February 27, 1989, one of several killings directed against the leftist Patriotic Union at the time. A mobile column of the guerilla group Revolutionary Armed Forces of Colombia was named after him.
