= Killing of James Patrick Ward =

- Location: Dunedin, New Zealand
- Date: 5 February 1962
- Attack type: Parcel bomb
- Deaths: 1
- Victim: James Patrick Ward
- Perpetrator: Unknown
- Inquiry: Unsolved crime

On 5 February 1962, Dunedin lawyer James Patrick Ward was murdered by a parcel bomb sent to his office. Ward suffered heavy injuries to his chest and right arm, with his left hand being blown off; after several operations at Dunedin hospital, Ward failed to recover from his injuries. The explosion also destroyed his desk and the exterior facing window of his office. The police never solved the crime and described it as "one of the most callous murders in the history of New Zealand crime."

== See also ==
- Crime in New Zealand
