= El Clarín (Venezuela) =

- Formation: 1989
- Founder: Luis Fernández Villegas
- Type: Newspapers in Venezuela
- Coordinates: 10°13′36″N 67°20′0″W
- Key people: Luis Fernández Villegas (CEO)
- Website: elclarinweb.com

El Clarín (founded on October 7, 1989, in La Victoria, Aragua state) is a newspaper from Venezuela that circulates in the central region of the country. Especially, in the East Axis of the Aragua state. On a smaller scale, in the states of Guárico, Miranda and Caracas. Its current president is the journalist Luis Fernández Villegas.

== Review ==
The newspaper was born in the city of La Victoria. With its slogan From La Victoria for Aragua, it subsequently covered the news event of the east axis of the entity. It currently prints 25,000 copies daily, using a European tabloid format with 24 pages of information. The distribution of the specimens is done under a mixed modality: through pregoneros, kiosks and commercial establishments. The medium is characterized by producing editorial content where citizen journalism and local news coverage predominate. In 2011 it presented a redesign of the digital platforms, under the brand El Clarin Web.

Renowned Venezuelan journalists have been part of the writing of El Clarín. Among them: Germán Carías, Miguel Conde, Misaél Salazar Léindez, Omar Luis Colmenares, Gustavo Gil Quintero, Ketty Urdaneta, Simón Enrique López, Ramiro de Armas, Luis Fernández Villegas; awarded with local, national and international distinctions.

== See also ==
- List of newspapers in Venezuela

== Bibliography ==
- Salazar, L.M. (2000). History of El Clarín (in Spanish). Gráfica 7 en 1.
