= List of universities in Venezuela =

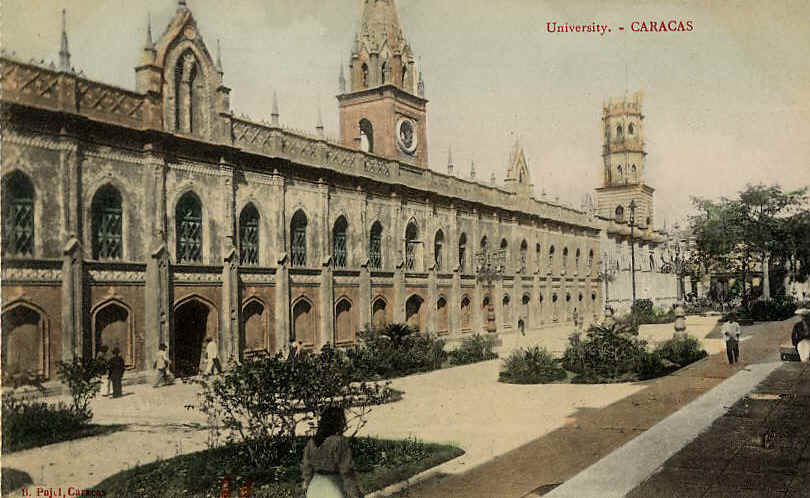
The Universidad Central de Venezuela old campus in 1911. The building also served as the location for the National Library when it was founded in 1833. It is known as the "Palacio de las Academias".

Venezuela has a wide array of universities, offering courses in a broad variety of subjects, spread between a total 23 public and 24 private universities located across several states. As a result of a Royal Decree signed by Philip V of Spain, the Central University of Venezuela—the country's oldest—was founded in 1721 as "Universidad Real y Pontificia de Caracas". The campus was originally at the now-known "Palacio de las Academias" but, in 1944, president Isaías Medina Angarita relocated it to the University City of Caracas.

The second oldest university is the University of the Andes. Formally established in 1810 as the "Real Universidad de San Buenaventura de Mérida de los Caballeros", the university began as a priest school founded by Fray Juan Ramos de Lora in the city of Mérida in 1785. The University of Zulia—the third-oldest university—was founded in 1891 when the Federal College of Maracaibo was converted into a university. The government ordered the closure of the university for political reasons in 1904, and it remained closed until 1946. The University of Carabobo is the last to be founded before the twentieth century by being established in 1892 and dating back to 1833 when the College of Carabobo was created by presidential decree.

The first private university established in the country was the Andres Bello Catholic University, founded in 1953 as the "Catholic University of Venezuela" under the government of Marcos Pérez Jiménez. The development of the Nueva Esparta University begun when the Nueva Esparta College was established in 1954. Originally designed as an extension of the Andres Bello Catholic University in 1962, the Catholic University of Táchira was established as an autonomic university in 1982. The Metropolitan University's foundation dates back to 1960, when entrepreneur Eugenio Mendoza led a civil group to develop an institution "skilled to capacitate, with modern criteria, young students from all social classes." The university was finally established in 1970.

== List ==
=== Public ===
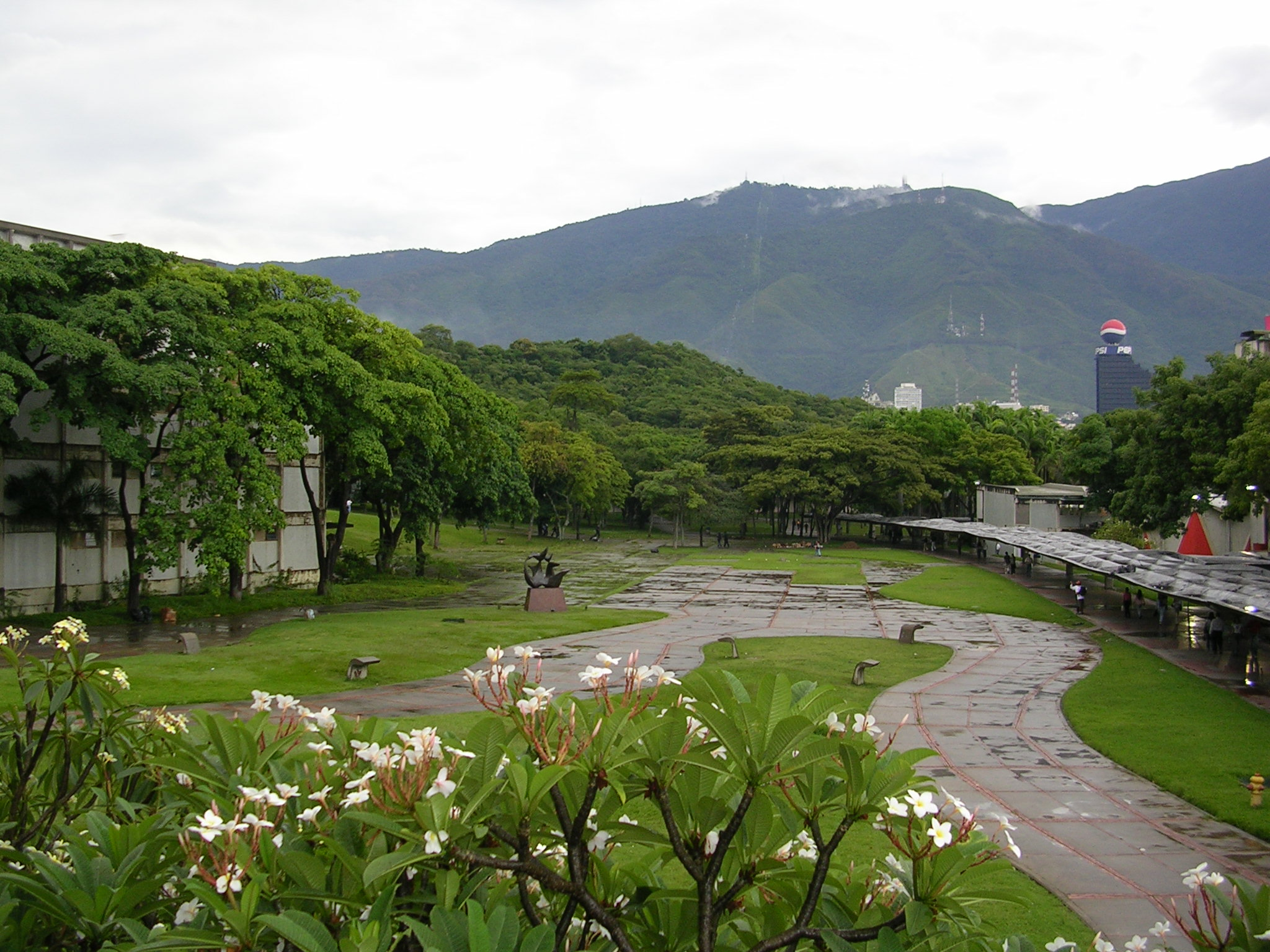
The Universidad Central de Venezuela was founded in 1721 as the "Universidad Real y Pontificia de Caracas", as a result of a Royal Decree signed by Philip V of Spain.

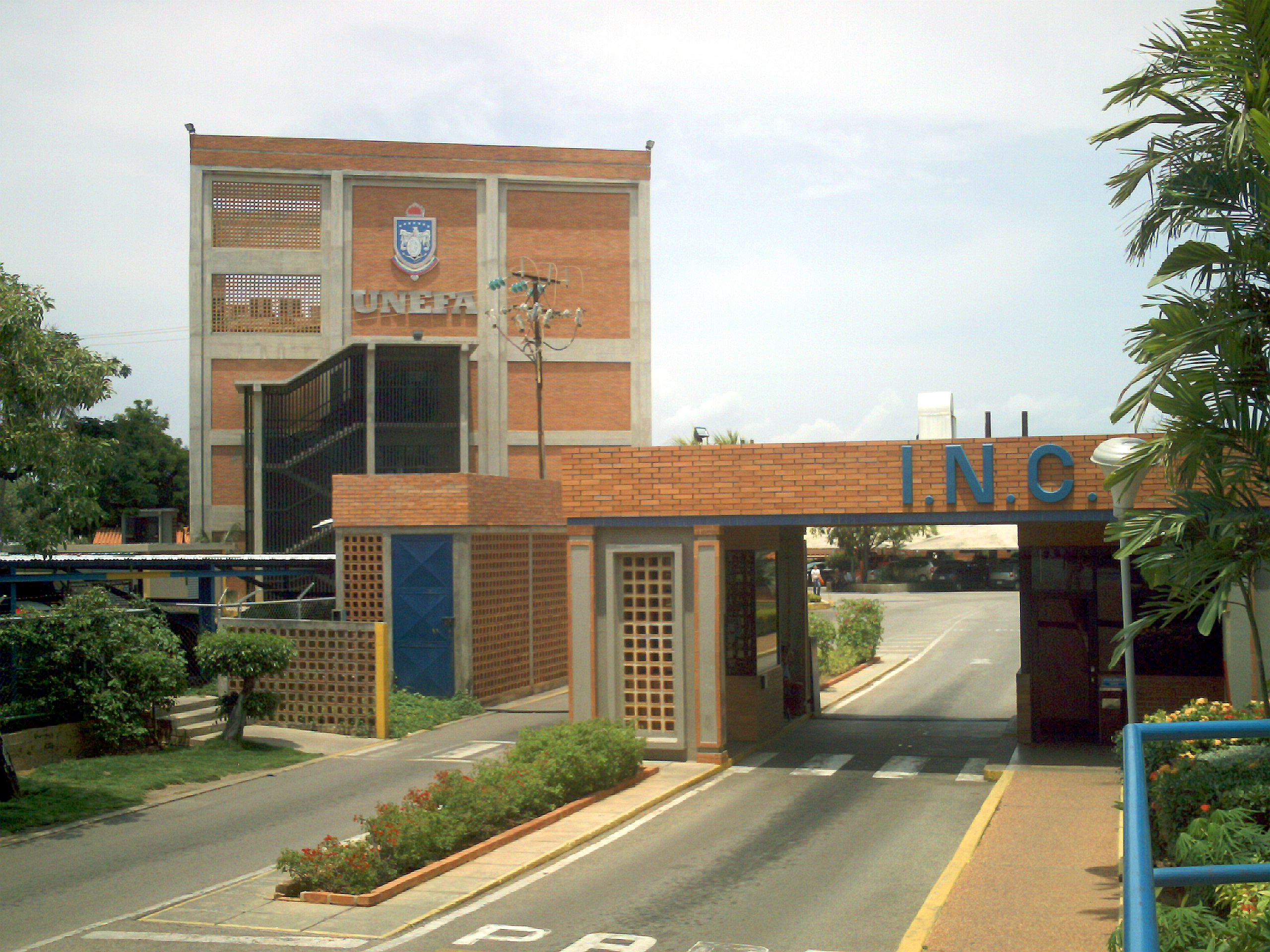
The Universidad Politécnica de la Fuerza Armada Nacional was established in 1974 by a resolution of the ministry of defense and the president of Venezuela, Rafael Caldera.

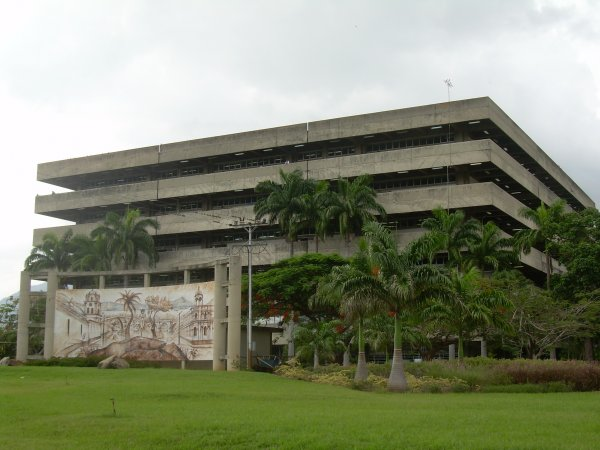
The University of Carabobo was established by presidential decree in 1833.

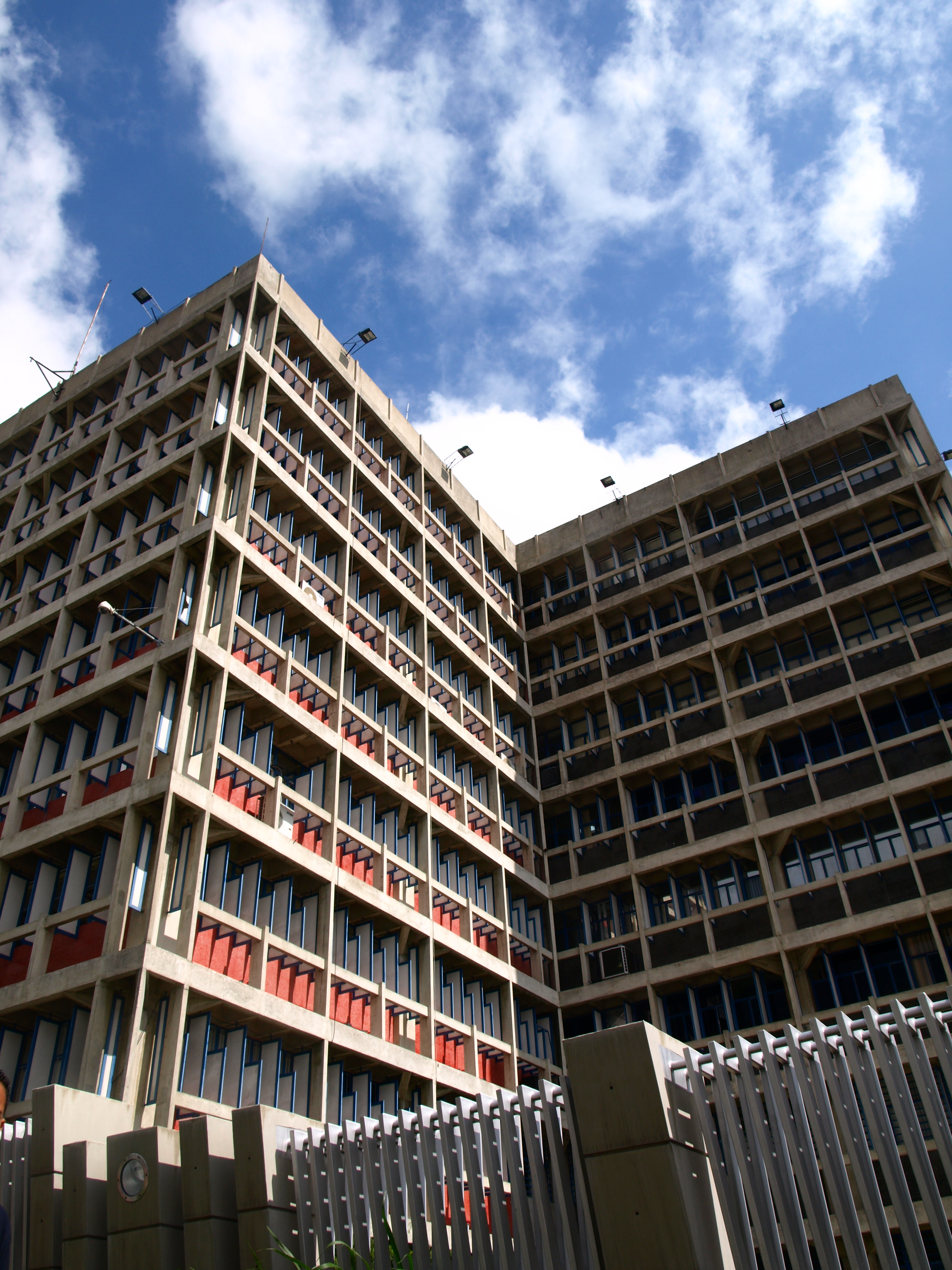
The Universidad de Los Andes was established 1810 as the "Real Universidad de San Buenaventura de Mérida de los Caballeros".

Public universities with foundation date and location
Name	Founded	Headquarters^{[A]}	Ref.
Universidad Bolivariana de Venezuela (UBV)	2003	Caracas	
Universidad Central de Venezuela (UCV)	1721	Caracas	
Universidad Centro Occidental Lisandro Alvarado (UCLA)	1962	Barquisimeto	
Universidad de Carabobo (UC)	1892	Valencia	
Universidad Indígena de Venezuela (UIV)	2000	Bolívar	
Universidad Nacional Experimental de la Gran Caracas (UNEXCA)	2018	Caracas	
Universidad Nacional Experimental de Guayana (UNEG)	1982	Puerto Ordaz and San Felix	
Universidad de Los Andes (ULA)	1810	Mérida	
Universidad de Los Llanos Centrales Rómulo Gallegos (UNERG)	1977	San Juan de los Morros	
Universidad de Los Llanos Occidentales Ezequiel Zamora (UNELLEZ)	1975	Barinas	
Universidad Nacional Experimental del Táchira (UNET)	1974	San Cristóbal	
Universidad Nacional Experimental de Yaracuy (UNEY)	2000	San Felipe	
Universidad del Zulia (LUZ)	1891	Maracaibo	
Universidad de Oriente (UDO)	1958	Cumaná	
Universidad Nacional Experimental Francisco de Miranda (UNEFM)	1977	Santa Ana de Coro	
Universidad Marítima del Caribe (UMC)	2000	Catia La Mar	
Universidad Nacional Abierta (UNA)	1977	Caracas	
Universidad Pedagógica Experimental Libertador (UPEL)	1983	Caracas	
Universidad Politécnica Antonio José de Sucre (UNEXPO)	1979	Barquisimeto	
Universidad Politécnica de la Fuerza Armada Nacional (UNEFA)	1974	Caracas	
Universidad Rafael María Baralt (UNERMB)	1982	Cabimas	
Universidad Simón Bolívar (USB)	1967	Caracas	
Universidad Simón Rodríguez (UNESR)	1971	Caracas	
Universidad Sur del Lago Jesús María Semprum (UNESUR)	2000	Colon, Zulia	

=== Private ===
Private universities with foundation date and location
Name	Founded	Headquarters^{[A]}	Ref.
Instituto Universitario Politécnico "Santiago Mariño" (IUPSM)	1991	Barcelona	
Universidad Alejandro de Humboldt (UNIHUMBOLDT)	1997	Caracas	
Universidad Alonso de Ojeda (UNIOJEDA)	2002	Ciudad Ojeda	
Universidad Arturo Michelena (UAM)	2001	Valencia	
Universidad Bicentenaria de Aragua (UBA)	1986	Maracay	
Universidad Rafael Urdaneta (URU)	1974	Maracaibo	
Universidad Católica Andrés Bello (UCAB)	1953	Caracas	
Universidad Católica Cecilio Acosta (UNICA)	1983	Maracaibo	
Universidad Católica del Táchira (UCAT)	1962^{[B]}	San Cristóbal	
Universidad Católica Santa Rosa (SANTAROSA)	1999^{[C]}	Caracas	
Universidad de Margarita (UNIMAR)	2000	Isla de Margarita	
Universidad Dr. José Gregorio Hernández (UJGH)	2002	Valera	
Universidad Fermín Toro (UFT)	1989	Barquisimeto	
Universidad José Antonio Páez (UJAP)	1997	Valencia	
Universidad José María Vargas (UJMV)	1995	Caracas	
Universidad Metropolitana (UNIMET)	1970	Caracas	
Universidad Monteávila (UMA)	1998	Caracas	
Universidad Nororiental Gran Mariscal de Ayacucho (UGMA)	1987	Barcelona	
Universidad Nueva Esparta (UNE)	1954	Caracas	
Universidad Panamericana del Puerto (UNIPAP)	2003	Puerto Cabello	
Universidad Rafael Belloso Chacin (URBE)	1989	Maracaibo	
Universidad Santa María (USM)	1983	Caracas	
Universidad Tecnológica del Centro (UNITEC)	1979	Guacara	
Universidad Valle del Momboy (UVM)	1997	Valera	
Universidad Yacambú (UNY)	1989	Barquisimeto	

== See also ==
- List of universities in Venezuela by size

== Notes ==
- ^{A} Most universities have main headquarters and several additional campuses spread across the country where additional careers are taught. This column only lists the main headquarters' location.
- ^{B} The Universidad Católica del Táchira, founded as an extension of the Universidad Católica Andrés Bello, received its autonomy in 1982.
- ^{C} The Universidad Católica Santa Rosa was originally entitled "Universidad Santa Rosa" at the time of its foundation in 1999. The name was changed in 2003.
