= Movimiento Estudiantil (Venezuela) =

Student Organization

The Student Movement
- Movimiento Estudiantil
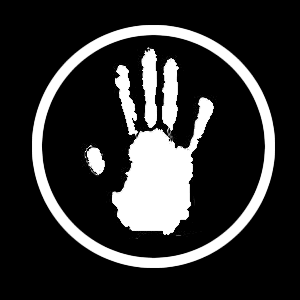
- Formation: 2007
- Type: Student organization
- Purpose: Activism
- Location: Venezuela
- Region served: National
- Official language: Spanish
- Key people: Yon Goicoechea; Freddy Guevara; Juan Andrés Mejía

Movimiento Estudiantil (English: The Student Movement) is a Venezuelan student movement started in 2007, made up of students who organized in opposition to the government of President Hugo Chávez. According to several analysts, it had a decisive effect on the rejection of the 2007 Venezuelan constitutional referendum.

== History ==
=== RCTV closure protests ===
This movement is active in Venezuela since the protests by the end of the concession of RCTV, which began on May 27 of 2007, when the government of Hugo Chávez shut down the television channel RCTV.

At the height of the protests, the movement applied to intervene in the National Assembly of Venezuela. The request was granted and a debate between opponents and other college students affects students left government was organized. However, the leaders of the opposition movement refused to discuss and withdrew after a brief intervention.

=== Referendum protests ===
In late June, RCTV managed to continue producing unofficial daily broadcasts by posting them on YouTube and running on a severely minimized staff. However, the government refused to sway in their decision not to renew the channel's license. National protests calmed and quieted down as Chavez and his government continuously failed to address or acknowledge any of the protest activity.

The momentum that the student movement had picked up after the closing of RCTV was channeled into protests against Chavez's proposed national referendum, as the students believed that the 69 amendments on the ballot would give the president too much power over the government and the country. The referendum was rejected in the December elections, and RCTV's alternative broadcasting continued smoothly for the next two and a half years until 2010, when the channel did not air a speech made by President Chavez and therefore ran into trouble with laws that required Chavez's speeches to all be shown by cable companies and broadcast channels.

In November 2007, demonstrations arose in Caracas, Venezuela and six other cities over the proposed constitutional changes. "Tens of thousands" of "Yes" voters marched in Caracas after the referendum had finally been approved on 2 November. An 8 November riot at the Central University of Venezuela resulted in clashes between students and several masked gunmen, with several injuries; footage was caught on tape. In late November 2007, just days before the referendum, tens of thousands marched in Caracas for both the "Yes" and "No" votes. An opposition politician estimated the crowd marching for the "No" vote at 160,000. Protests were largely peaceful, and only one pro-government worker's death has been reported.

Some of Chávez's supporters expressed concerns and disagreement with his proposals to change the constitution.

Many voters abstained in the vote, rather than cast a "No" vote against Chávez. The student movement played a crucial role in consolidating this position and in organizing numerous rallies. The student movement has played a large role in the Venezuelan political process, having gained a prominent position during the RCTV broadcast license expiration protests. Although the student movement is not limited to the opposition, it has been the opposition students that have gained the largest support, in part because they are not officially affiliated with any political cadres.

=== University crisis protests ===
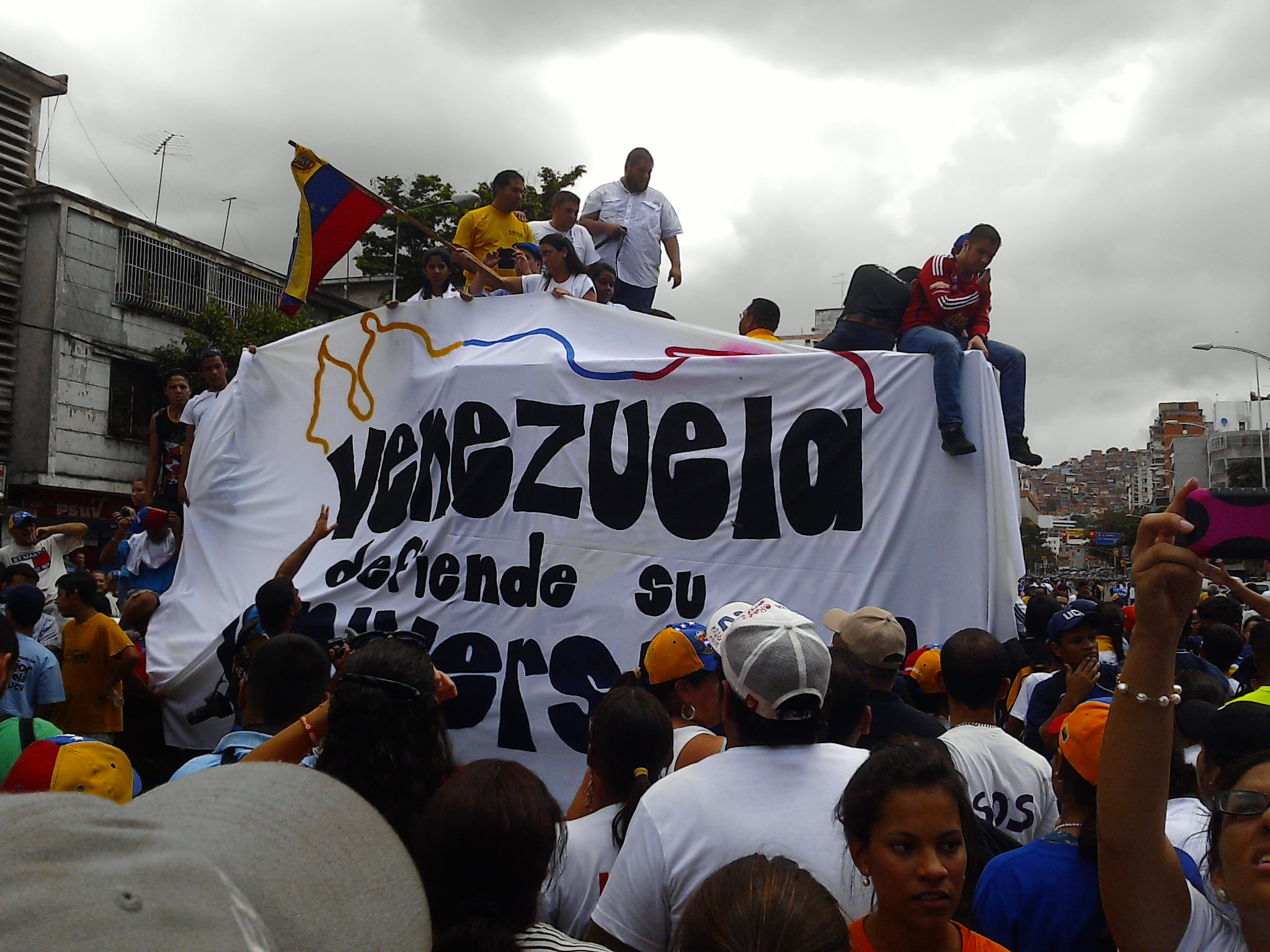
Student representatives speaking to the crowd during a college march in Caracas, Venezuela in 2013.

Student Representatives are directed to the crowd during a college march in Caracas, Venezuela. 2013. The authorities of the autonomous universities of Venezuela have claimed budget increases Venezuela's government since the end of the first decade of the century. The government, meanwhile, has demanded increases in these institutions the number of admitted students.

In early 2013 the professors of various universities, grouped in the Federation of University Teachers' Associations of Venezuela ( FAPUV ) began the Venezuelan government pressure for increased wages and benefits, as well as increases the budget of public institutions in which they work. In June, after a hunger strike by students of various houses Studio. The FAPUV calls for a national strike of university professors, which intensified the conflict, launching a series of student protests, supported by some teachers and university employees . The protests marches consisted headquarters of various public agencies, obstruction of major roads in major cities, concentrations in places, among others.

The government offered a package of wages and benefits under the title One University Sector Collective Bargaining Agreement, which offered, among other things, a stepwise increase of wages. The same was rejected by the FAPUV, because the contract was discussed without his presence, as it included items specifically socialist ideological tone, which in his opinion violated the constitution and freedom of thought that must exist in the university sector.

The government called FAPUV and student federations at various negotiations, but did not get great results, managed to reduce conflict. In September, the teacher decides to raise FAPUV unemployment, with the caveat resume later if they felt that the negotiations did not have the desired progress.

=== 2014 Venezuelan protests ===
After a day of protests in Venezuela in 2014, which began on January 5 in the City of Mérida and February 4 in the city of San Cristobal after the death of Hector Moreno of ULA-Mérida and the attempted rape of a student-ULA Táchira, plus the street call made by national political leaders Antonio Ledezma, Maria Corina Machado and Leopoldo Lopez called La Salida or 12F, several student leaders decided to organize a political bloc with leaders of civil society which they called "Patriotic Meeting Student and Popular", which later christened under the eponym of "José Félix Ribas". Some student leaders decided not to annex this group maintaining its call under, including Juan Requesens of the National Student Movement FCU President of the Central University of Venezuela and Yorman Barillas, President of the University of Zulia .

== Universities involved ==
Autonomous National Universities

- Universidad de Los Andes
- Universidad Central de Venezuela
- Universidad del Zulia
- Universidad de Carabobo
- Universidad de Oriente

Experimental National Universities

- Universidad Nacional Experimental del Táchira
- Universidad Nacional Experimental Simón Bolívar
- Universidad Nacional Experimental de Guayana
- Universidad Nacional Experimental de los Llanos Occidentales Ezequiel Zamora
- Universidad Nacional Experimental de los Llanos Centrales Rómulo Gallegos
- Universidad Pedagógica Experimental Libertador
- Universidad Centroccidental Lisandro Alvarado
- Universidad Nacional Experimental Francisco de Miranda
- Universidad Nacional Abierta
- Universidad Nacional Experimental Politécnica

Private Universities

- Universidad Católica Andrés Bello
- Universidad Arturo Michelena
- Universidad Alejandro de Humboldt
- Universidad José María Vargas
- Universidad Católica del Táchira
- Universidad Bicentenaria de Aragua
- Universidad Rafael Belloso Chacin
- Universidad José Antonio Páez
- Universidad Católica Cecilio Acosta
- Universidad Santa María
- Universidad Metropolitana
- Universidad Monteávila
- Universidad Católica Santa Rosa

== See also ==
- Generation of 1928
