= List of universities in Venezuela by enrollment =

This is a list of universities and other higher education institutions in Venezuela by size of student population, it only reflects the institutions with a source of enrollment, those with no information of the enrollment, were not shown.

== List ==
Universities and other higher education institutions with student population and their location
Rank	Institution	Total students	Cities (Headquarter in bold)^{[A]}	Ref.
1	Universidad del Zulia (LUZ)	75,977	**Maracaibo**, Cabimas and Punto Fijo	
2	Universidad de Carabobo (UC)	60,916	**Valencia**, Maracay and San Carlos	
3	Universidad Central de Venezuela (UCV)	57,569	**Caracas**, Maracay and Cagua	
4	Universidad de Los Andes (ULA)	54,595 (only in Mérida city)	**Mérida**, San Cristóbal, Trujillo, Tovar, El Vigía	
5	Universidad de Oriente (UDO)	46,752	**Cumaná**, Barcelona, Maturín, Ciudad Bolívar, Porlamar, Puerto Ordaz, Carúpano and Anaco.	
6	Universidad Rafael Belloso Chacin (URBE)	31,277	**Maracaibo**	
7	Universidad Gran Mariscal de Ayacucho (UGMA)	17,500 approx.	**Barcelona**, Anaco, El Tigre, Maturín, Ciudad Bolívar and Ciudad Guayana	
8	Universidad Católica Andrés Bello (UCAB)	16,339	**Caracas**, Los Teques, Ciudad Guayana and Coro	
9	Universidad Nacional Experimental de Guayana (UNEG)	14,563	**Puerto Ordaz** and Ciudad Guayana	
10	Universidad Simón Bolívar (USB)	11,228	**Caracas** and Naiguatá	
11	Universidad Metropolitana (UNIMET)	5,500	**Caracas**, Valencia, Maracaibo, Guatire and Puerto La Cruz	
12	Universidad Indígena de Venezuela (UIV)	810	**Tauca** and some indigenous villages in Bolívar state and Amazonas state	

== See also ==
- List of largest universities by enrollment
- List of universities in Venezuela
