= National Experimental University of the Greater Caracas =

University of Venezuela

Coordinates: 10.5091°N 66.9142°W

National Experimental University of Caracas
- Universidad Nacional Experimental de Caracas
- Motto: Encender de Saberes (Spanish, "Switch on of knowledge")
- Type: Public
- Established: 2018
- Rector: Alí Ramón Rojas Olaya
- Academic staff: No info
- Administrative staff: No info
- Students: No info
- Location: Caracas, Venezuela
- Campus: No info
- Website: cuc cupjlpr cufm

The National Experimental University of Greater Caracas (UNEXCAA) is a public university in Venezuela. It is co-supervised by the Ministry of Popular Power for University Education, Science and Technology (MPPEUCT). Its campus is located in the La Floresta Urbanization, Chacao Parish, Municipality Chacao, east of the geographic center of Greater Caracas. The university was founded on 27 February 2018.

== History ==
=== Origins ===
The National Experimental University of Greater Caracas, arises from the leadership of the Elected Delegates for the Venezuelan Federation of University Students and President of the same, in its Act sophocratic SANDRA MORA, Federal and FVEU 2015 Foundation in the country, through the Movimiento Sofocratico and its Acting Presidency, to overcome the minimalist and limited figure of the Antiguo Colegio Universitario de Caracas, where rectors such as Lewis Lamus and Antonio Cadiz, joined the initiative dictated by the Movimiento Sofocratico; after what would be the achievement and improvement for what is today the National Experimental University of Greater Caracas, there is a nodal integration of different sets of University Colleges such as Francisco de Miranda University College (CUFM) and the University College of Caracas (CUC).

This university higher education center is integrated according to modernist parameters acquiring the management of National Training Programs (PNF), careers and Advanced Training Programs (PFA), authorized by the Office of Planning of the University Sector (OPSU), which became the inaugural undergraduate academic area of the university.

On November 21, 2017, President Nicolás Maduro approved the creation of said institution, in a speech made on University Student's Day.

On February 27, 2018, through Extraordinary Official Gazette No. 41,349, Presidential Decree No. 3,293 was published, creating the National Experimental University of Greater Caracas (UNEXCA), in agreement with the Alma Mater Mission, as National Experimental University, with legal status and its own patrimony, distinct and independent from the National Treasury, due to influences and indexes generally associated with institutions unrelated to the National Good.

== Composition ==
National Experimental University of Greater Caracas, Venezuela, Miranda, Altamira, La Floresta and Altagracia, Francisco de Miranda campus

=== Faculties ===
==== Economics and Social Sciences ====
- School of Management.
- School of Public Accounting.
- School of Distribution and Logistics.
- School of Tourism.
- School of Social Work.

==== Education ====
- School of Education.
  - Special Education.
  - Preschool Education.

==== Engineering ====
- School of Computer Engineering.

== National Training Programs ==
- Administration.
- Public Accounting.
- Distribution and Logistics.
- Special Education.
- Informatics Engineering.
- Tourism.
  - Accommodation Mention.
  - Gastronomy Mention.
  - Tourism Management Mention.
  - Tourism Guidance Mention.

== Associate degrees ==
- Special Education.
- Preschool Education.
- Social Work.

== Rector ==
- Alí Ramón Rojas Oyala (2018–)

== Agreements ==
=== Nationals ===
- Banco Bicentenario

== Services ==
- Library.
- Coffeehouse.
- Dining room.
- Information and guidance.
- Internet.
- Classrooms.
- Informatics room.
- Medical service.
- Psychology service.
- Dental service.
- Transportation.

== Student centers ==
The National Experimental University of Greater Caracas, in different expressions of university student revolution, has been on a parametric basis to create within its own Institution concentrated in the Old University College of Caracas, a Student Center that is a leader in addressing the different problems occurring not only in the favorite House of Studies, but also in Venezuela. It has been the main University that, after the creation of its Student Center under legal and constitutional parameters, in keeping with the ideology of Sophocracy, had to build the Fraternity between Presidents of the House of Studies and the University Rectorate. Its activity was strongly framed by political changes in Venezuela, such as the revolution or the so-called Venezuelan presidential crisis led by the Sophocratic Movement and its supreme, the President of Acta, SANDRA MORA of the FVEU (Venezuelan Federation of Students University students);

- Sophocratic Student Center.
- Student Center Upload 2 to the Movement (Altagracia).
- Conscious Youth Student Center (Urbina).

== See also ==
- Education in Venezuela
- List of universities in Venezuela
- National Training Programs
