= Universidad Alejandro de Humboldt =

Private university in Caracas, Venezuela

Universidad Alejandro de Humboldt/UAH
- Universidad Alejandro de Humboldt
- Motto: A Suscipit in Adventu Altius Instituere
- Motto in English: A Dynamic Approach in Higher Education
- Type: Private
- Established: 1997; 29 years ago
- Rector: Soc. Manuel Carlos Sulbarán.
- Students: 12,200
- Undergraduates: 11,000
- Postgraduates: 1,200
- Location: (Venezuela) Caracas, Venezuela
- Campus: Urban
- Colors: Red, white and black
- Website: www.unihumboldt.edu.ve

Universidad Alejandro de Humboldt was named in honor of Alexander von Humboldt, the German naturalist and explorer. UAH is a Venezuelan private university sponsored by the Civil Association Educational Humboldt, created by the National University Council in Resolution No. 28 of 25 July 1997 and authorized in its operation by Presidential Decree No. 2.225 of December 1, 1997.

== Student body ==
Enrollment is 12,200 including 1200 graduate students, approximately 70 percent women, 30 percent men.

== Academic offerings ==
UAH offers six bachelor's degree programs and two Engineer's degree programs known as an Engineer Diploma (abbreviated Dipl. Ing. or DI) Engineering education including eight diploma programs and two master's degree programs (MBA) through its three schools.

- School Social Sciences and Economy
- School Engineering
- School Humanities and Education.

== Degrees ==
=== School of Engineering ===
- Civil Maintenance
- Software Engineering

UAH offers the following undergraduate programs:

=== School of Humanities and Education ===
- Modern Languages
- Publicity - Advertising

=== School of Social Sciences and Economy ===
- Administration
- Accounting
- Economy
- Tourism Administration
- International Commerce

== Research ==
Research is conducted within the individual colleges. Major interdisciplinary research thrusts include:

- Information Technology
- Management of science and technology Modeling and simulation
- Systems engineering; and robotics.

== Accreditation ==
UAH "Universidad Alejandro de Humboldt" is accredited by the Ministry of Higher Education.

== Rector ==
Soc. Manuel Carlos Sulbarán

== Location ==
The main university campus is located in Caracas, Miranda State.

- Los Dos Caminos

Av. Rómulo Gallegos, Con 1ra. Transversal de Montecristo Edificio Universidad Alejandro de Humboldt. Caracas

There are campuses in Caracas District Capital in:

- Plaza Venezuela (Principal)

Av. Lima, entre Plaza Venezuela y Av. Libertador, Edif. Universidad Alejandro de Humboldt. Caracas

- Plaza Venezuela (Faces)

Av. Lima, entre Plaza Venezuela y Av. Libertador, Edif. Universidad Alejandro de Humboldt. Caracas

- El Bosque

Av. Principal del Bosque (Frente a Proseín) Edif. Universidad Alejandro de Humboldt. Caracas

- Valencia, Carabobo State

Final Av. Pocaterra, Cruce con Calle Colinas, El Trigal Centro, Edif. Universidad Alejandro de Humboldt.

== See also ==
- List of universities in Venezuela
- Informatics Engineering
- Business Administration
- Accountancy
- Economy
- International Trade
- Publicity
- Education in Venezuela
