= Bicentenary University of Aragua =

University in Venezuela

Universidad Bicentenaria de Aragua
- Type: Private
- Established: 16 June 1986
- Rector: Dr. Basilio Sánchez Aranguren
- Location: Turmero, Aragua, Venezuela; 10°13′57″N 67°31′42″W
- Website: http://www.uba.edu.ve/

The Universidad Bicentenaria de Aragua (UBA) is a private institution of higher education in Turmero, Aragua State, Venezuela.

Undergraduate degrees offered:

Engineering Faculty

- Systems engineering
- Electrical engineering

Faculty of Management and Social Sciences

- Administration
- Public Accounting
- Social Communication
- Psychology

Faculty of Political and Legal Sciences

- Law
