= Universidad José María Vargas =

Universidad José María Vargas is a university in Caracas, based in the Sucre Municipality.
