= Universidad Indígena de Venezuela =

Indigenous University of Venezuela
- Universidad Indígena de Venezuela
- Type: Public
- Established: 2010; 16 years ago
- Students: 810
- Location: Tauca, Bolívar State, Venezuela
- Website: www.universidadindigenadevenezuela.com/index.html

Universidad Indígena de Venezuela (Indigenous University of Venezuela, UIV) is a public university created in 2010, based in Tauca, Bolívar State. Aimed at Venezuela's indigenous communities, it has campuses in Bolívar and Amazonas, and a 2010 enrollment of 810. The indigenous people of Venezuela make up only around 1.5% of the population nationwide, but the proportion is nearly 50% in Amazonas.
