= Universidad José Antonio Páez =

- Motto: Anima, Mens et Vigor (Soul, mind and strength)
- Type: Private university
- Established: 1997
- Chancellor: Inés González de Salama
- Location: San Diego, Carabobo, Venezuela
- Website: www.ujap.edu.ve

Universidad José Antonio Páez (UJAP) is a private university named after the Venezuelan war hero José Antonio Páez, located in the city of San Diego, Carabobo State, Venezuela. The university, also known as "UJAP", is one of the fastest growing campuses in the country with an enrollment of nearly 15,000 students.

== History ==
On September 17, 1997, the President of Venezuela, Rafael Caldera, issued the operating authorization for the university, based in the city of Valencia.

On November 12, 1991, six years before the authorization was granted, engineers Pedro Vivas González and Franca Ribaldi Langella decided to create a civil society named Universidad José Antonio Páez, whose objectives were and are: to promote and develop university-level teaching; promote the training of human resources at the postgraduate level; promote scientific and technological research activities taking into account the needs established by the planning agencies of this sector; promote extension activities and promote industrial production in order to generate resources.

This clear vision of these promoters, who came from the University of Carabobo, and who had dedicated enormous efforts throughout their lives to improving Venezuelan education. The Civil Association appointed them as Administrators and proceeded with the appointment of the Superior Council.

The project had been conceived and substantiated in a precise analysis of the labor market in the central region of the country, greatly influenced by industrial growth. The promise of the promoters became a reality that stands out every day for its academic growth. Remarkable institutional agreements have been achieved, and extension and postgraduate activities are promoted. Consistency and clear vision for the future.

The José Antonio Páez Private University is located in the San Diego Valley.

== Degrees ==
Universidad José Antonio Páez offers studies in 17 undergraduate courses and 10 postgraduate programs approved by the National Council of Universities. The university has a center for advanced studies called the UJAP Extension Center (CEUJAP) located in several cities in the country and with international recognition. UJAP houses a student population of approximately 19,000 students between undergraduate and graduate.

Undergraduate degrees offered:

- Industrial Engineering
- Mechanical Engineering
- Computer Engineering
- Electronic Engineering
- Telecommunications Engineering
- Civil Engineering
- Architecture
- Education
- Law
- Political Science
- Dentistry
- Business & Administration
- Accounting
- Marketing
- Industrial Relations
- Public Administration
- Public Accounting
