= Universidad Pedagógica Experimental Libertador =

Public university in Venezuela

Universidad Pedagogica Experimental Libertador
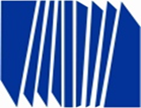
- Type: Public university
- Established: 1983
- Principal: Raúl López Sayagó
- Students: More of 50.000
- Location: Caracas, Venezuela
- Colours: Blue, white
- Website: www.upel.edu.ve

Universidad Pedagógica Experimental Libertador (Libertador Experimental Pedagogical University, UPEL) is the main public university institute, dedicated to the formation of teachers and professors in Venezuela. Its main headquarters is on Caracas, the capital of Venezuela, with centers (nucleos) in other regions, including Aragua, Lara, Miranda, Monagas, and Tachira. The Institute of Professional Improvement of Teachers (Instituto de Mejoramiento Profesional del Magisterio) constitutes part of the structure of the UPEL, which was named in honor of Simón Bolívar (El Libertador).
