= Caracas =

Capital and largest city of Venezuela

- Capital city
- Santiago de León de Caracas
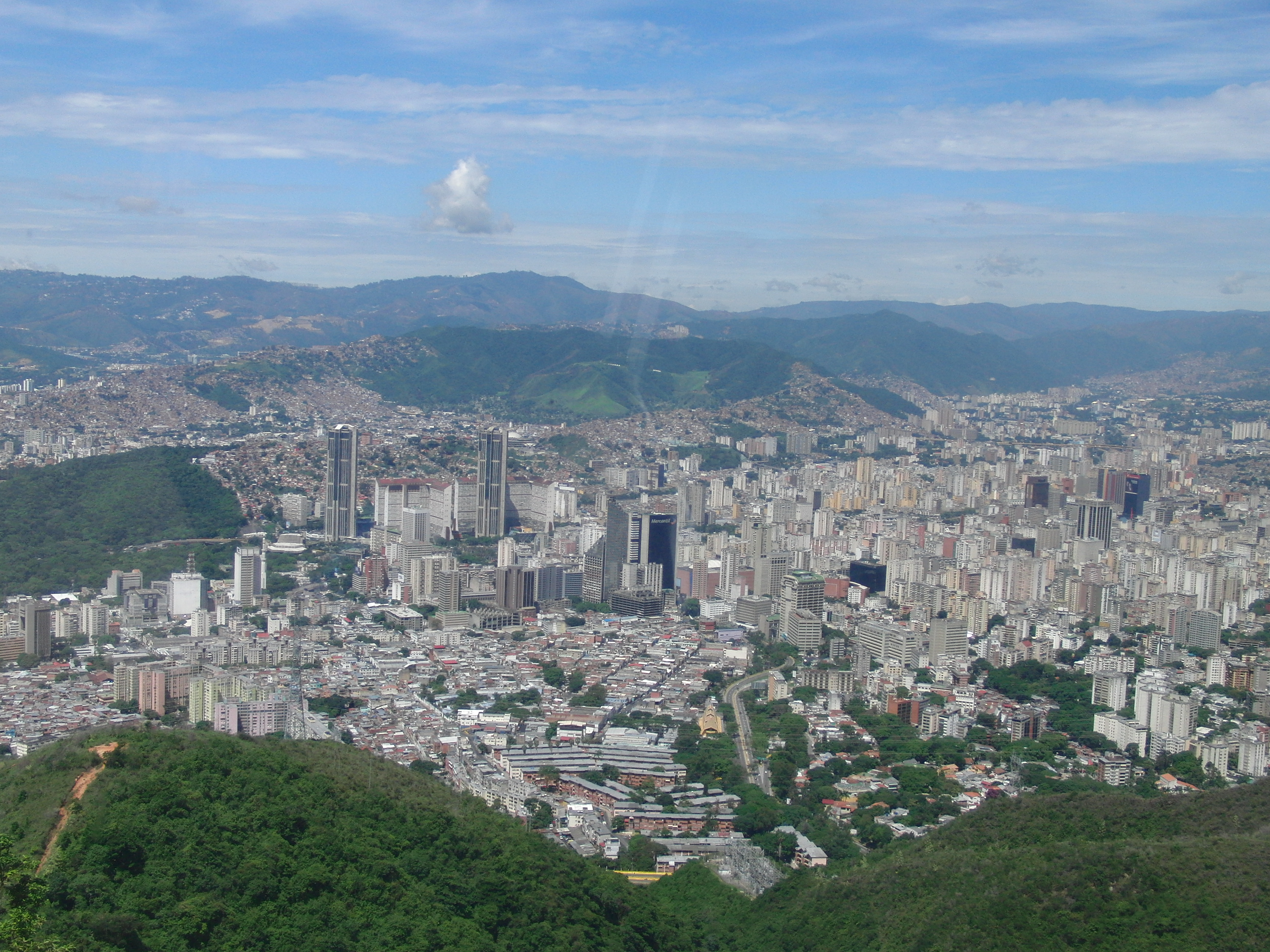
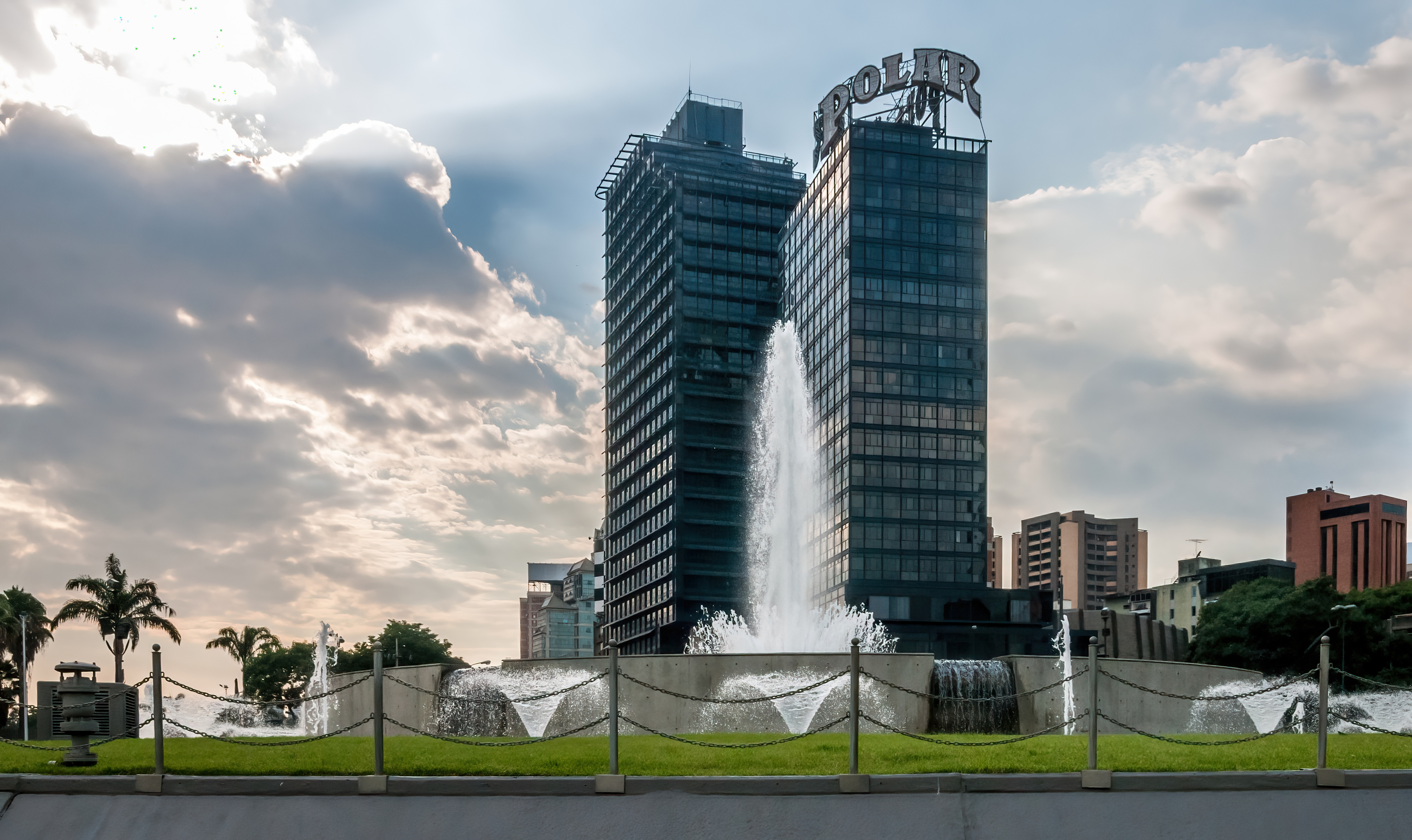
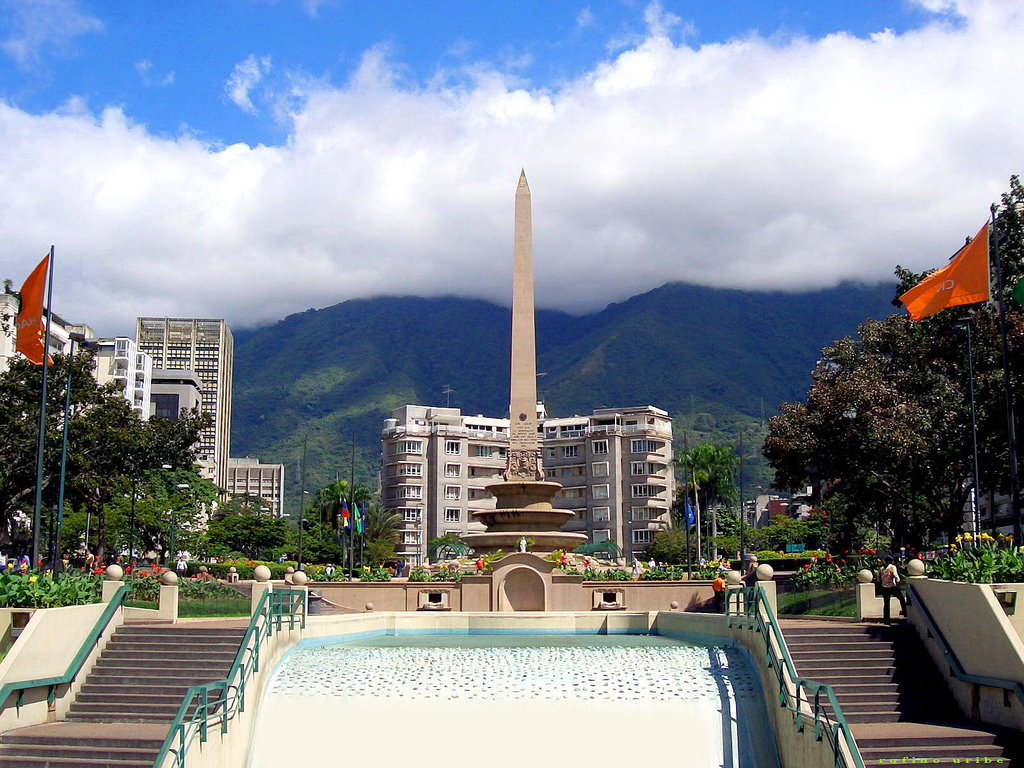
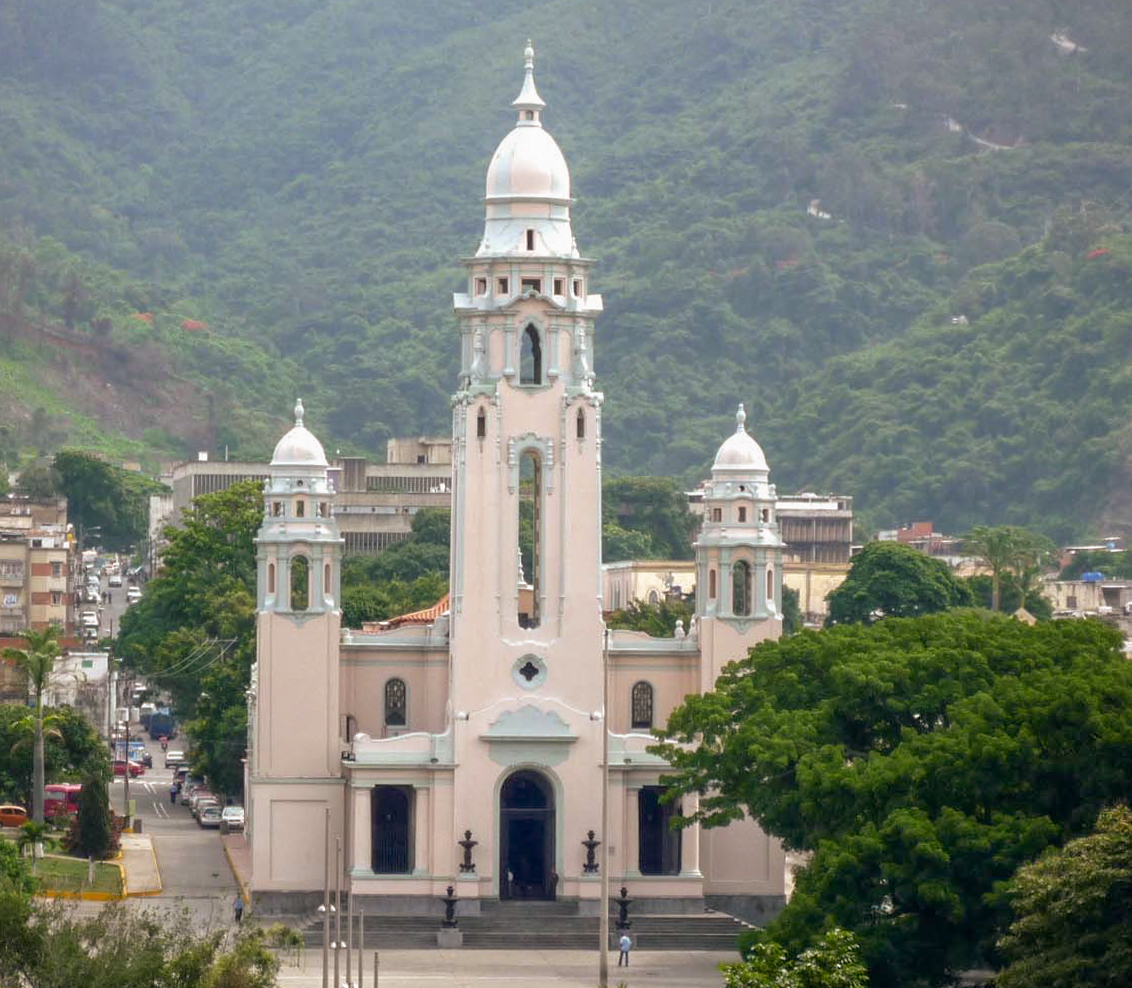
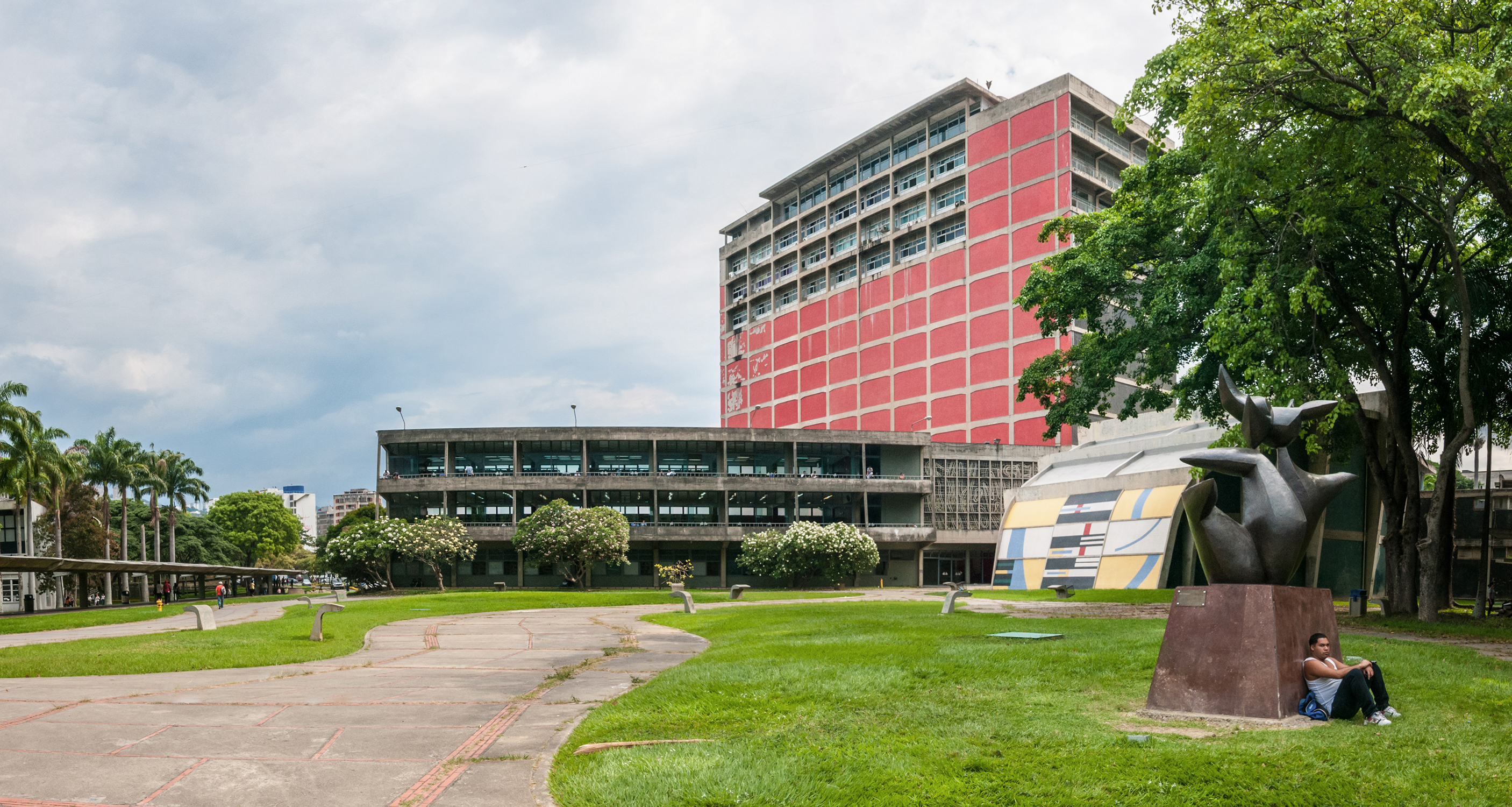
- Skyline from El Ávila National Park Plaza Venezuela Plaza Francia National Pantheon University City

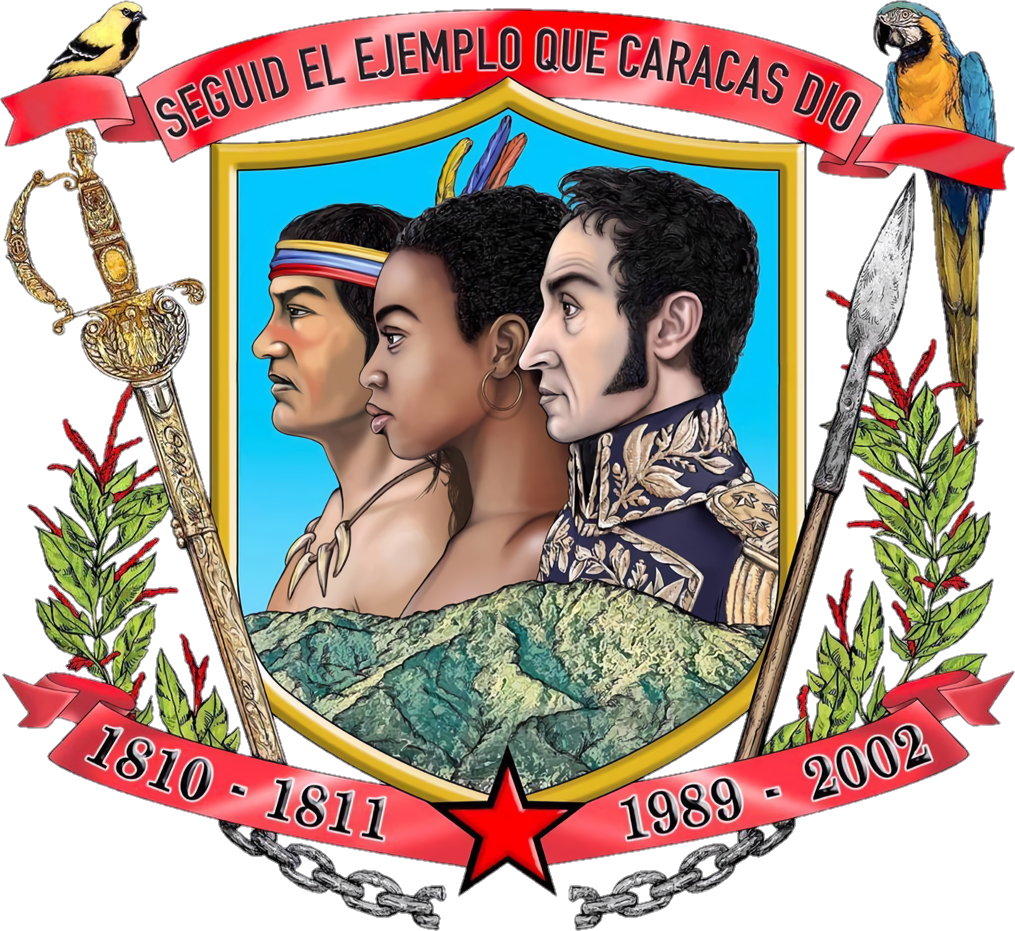
- Flag Coat of arms
- Nicknames: La Sucursal del Cielo; La Ciudad de la Eterna Primavera; La Odalisca del Ávila; La Sultana del Ávila
- Motto: Seguid El Ejemplo Que Caracas Dio. (Then Follow the Example that Caracas Gave.)
- Anthem: Caracas vencerá ("Caracas Will Win")
- Location in Venezuela Location in the Caribbean Location in South America
- Coordinates: 10°30′22″N 66°54′52″W
- Country: Venezuela
- State: Capital District
- Founded: 25 July 1567
- Founder: Diego de Losada
- Municipalities: Libertador, Baruta, Sucre, El Hatillo, and Chacao

Government
  - Type: Mayor–council
  - Body: Government of the Capital District
  - Chief of Government: Nahum Fernández

Area
  - Capital city: 433 km^{2} (167 sq mi)
  - Metro: 4,715.1 km^{2} (1,820.5 sq mi)
- Elevation: 900 m (3,000 ft)
- Highest elevation: 1,400 m (4,600 ft)
- Lowest elevation: 870 m (2,850 ft)

Population (2022)
  - Capital city: 3,242,000
  - Rank: 1st in Venezuela; 6th in South America
  - Density: 7,490/km^{2} (19,400/sq mi)
  - Metro: 5,297,026
- Demonyms: Caraquenian (Spanish: caraqueño (m), caraqueña (f))
- Time zone: UTC−04:00 (VET)
- Postal codes: 1000–1090, 1209
- Area code: 212
- ISO 3166 code: VE-A
- Website: www.caracas.gob.ve
- The area and population figures are the sum of the five municipalities listed above.

Caracas, (Note: /kəˈrækəs, -ˈrɑːk-/ kə-RA(H)K-əs, Spanish: [kaˈɾakas]) officially Santiago de León de Caracas (CCS), is the capital and largest city of Venezuela, and the center of the Metropolitan Region of Caracas (or Greater Caracas). It is located along the Guaire River in the northern part of Venezuela, within the Caracas Valley of the Venezuelan coastal mountain range. The valley is close to the Caribbean Sea, separated from the shore by a steep 2,200-meter-high (7,200-foot) mountain range, Cerro El Ávila. To the south there are more hills and mountains that form the valley. The Metropolitan Region of Caracas has an estimated population of over 5 million inhabitants.

The historic center of the city is the Caracas Cathedral, located on Bolívar Square, though some consider the center to be Plaza Venezuela, located in the Los Caobos area. Businesses in the city include service companies, banks, and malls. Caracas has a largely service-based economy, apart from some industrial activity in its metropolitan area. The Caracas Stock Exchange and Petróleos de Venezuela (PDVSA) are headquartered in Caracas. Empresas Polar, the largest private company in Venezuela, is also headquartered here. Caracas is Venezuela's cultural capital, with many restaurants, shopping centers, theaters, and museums found in the city, including the Museum of Contemporary Art of Caracas. Caracas is home to some of the tallest skyscrapers in Latin America, such as the Parque Central Towers.

== History ==
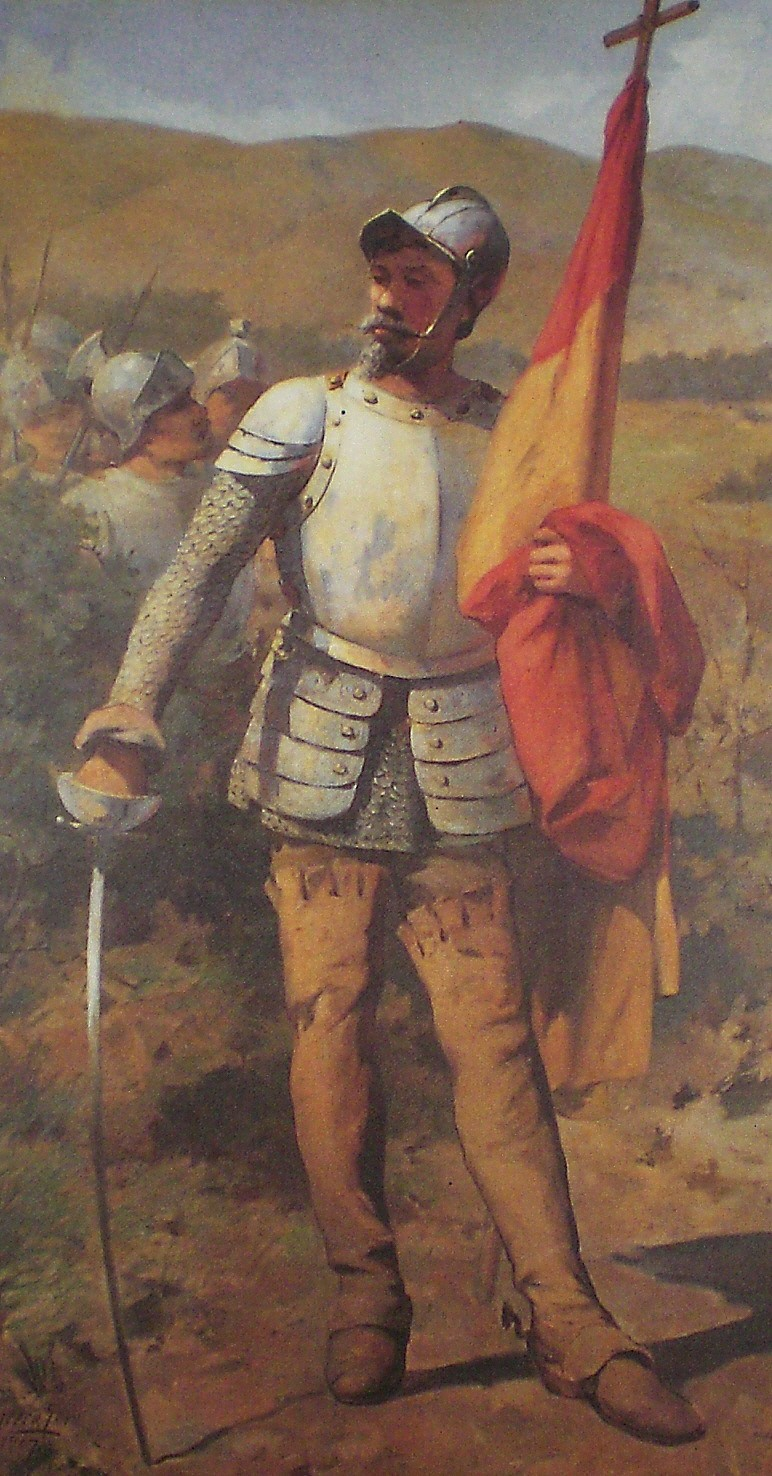
Diego de Losada by Antonio Herrera Toro

Before the city was founded in 1567, the valley of Caracas was populated by indigenous peoples. Francisco Fajardo, the son of a Spanish captain and a Waikeri cacique, who came from Margarita, began establishing settlements in the area of La Guaira and the Caracas valley between 1555 and 1560. Fajardo attempted to establish a plantation in the valley in 1562 after these coastal towns proved unsuccessful, but it did not last long, being destroyed by natives of the region led by Terepaima and Guaicaipuro. Fajardo's 1560 settlement was known as Hato de San Francisco, and another attempt in 1561 by Juan Rodríguez de Suárez was called Villa de San Francisco, and was also destroyed by the same native people. The eventual settlers of Caracas came from Coro, the capital of the German Klein-Venedig colony located around the present-day coastal Colombia–Venezuela border. From the 1540s, the colony had been de facto controlled by Spaniards. Moving eastward from Coro, groups of Spanish settlers founded inland towns including Barquisimeto and Valencia, before reaching the Caracas valley.

On 25 July 1567, Captain Diego de Losada laid the foundations of the city of Santiago de León de Caracas. De Losada had been commissioned to capture the valley, and was successful by splitting the natives into smaller groups and defeating each of them individually. Out of the newly established settlements, Caracas was the closest to the coast. The Spanish colonists retained a native workforce, which allowed them to develop a trade network between Caracas, the interior of Venezuela, and Margarita. The towns further inland traded cotton and beeswax, while Margarita was a rich source of pearls. The Caracas valley had a good environment for both agricultural and arable farming, which contributed to the system of commerce. However, the town's population was initially sparse, as it was only large enough to support a few farms.

In 1577, Caracas became the capital of the Spanish Empire's Venezuela Province, under the province's new governor Juan de Pimentel, leader from 1576–1583. In the 1580s, residents of Caracas started selling food via ship to Spanish soldiers stationed in Cartagena, who docked there to load goods from other parts of South America. Wheat was becoming increasingly expensive in the Iberian Peninsula, and the Spanish profited from buying it from farmers in Caracas. This cemented the city in the empire's trade circuit.

During the 16th and 17th centuries, the coast of Venezuela was frequently raided by pirates. With the coastal mountains of the Central Range acting as a barrier, Caracas was relatively immune to such attacks, compared to other Caribbean coastal settlements, but in 1595 the Preston–Somers expedition landed and around 200 English Privateers, including George Somers and Amyas Preston, crossed the mountains through a little-used pass while the town's defenders were guarding the more frequently used one. Encountering little resistance, the invaders sacked and set fire to the town after a failed ransom negotiation. The city managed to rebuild, using wheat profits and "a lot of sacrifice". In the 1620s, farmers in Caracas discovered that cacao beans could be sold, first selling them to native people of Mexico and quickly growing across the Caribbean. The city became important in the Viceroyalty of New Spain, and also moved from using largely native slave labor to African slaves, the first of the Spanish colonies to become part of the slave trade. The city was successful and operated on cacao and slave labor until the 1650s, when an alhorra blight, the Mexican Inquisition of many of their Portuguese traders, and increased cacao production in Guayaquil greatly affected the market. This and the destructive 1641 earthquake put the city into decline, and they likely began illegally trading with the Dutch Empire, which Caraqueños later proved sympathetic to; by the 1670s, Caracas had a trading route through Curaçao.

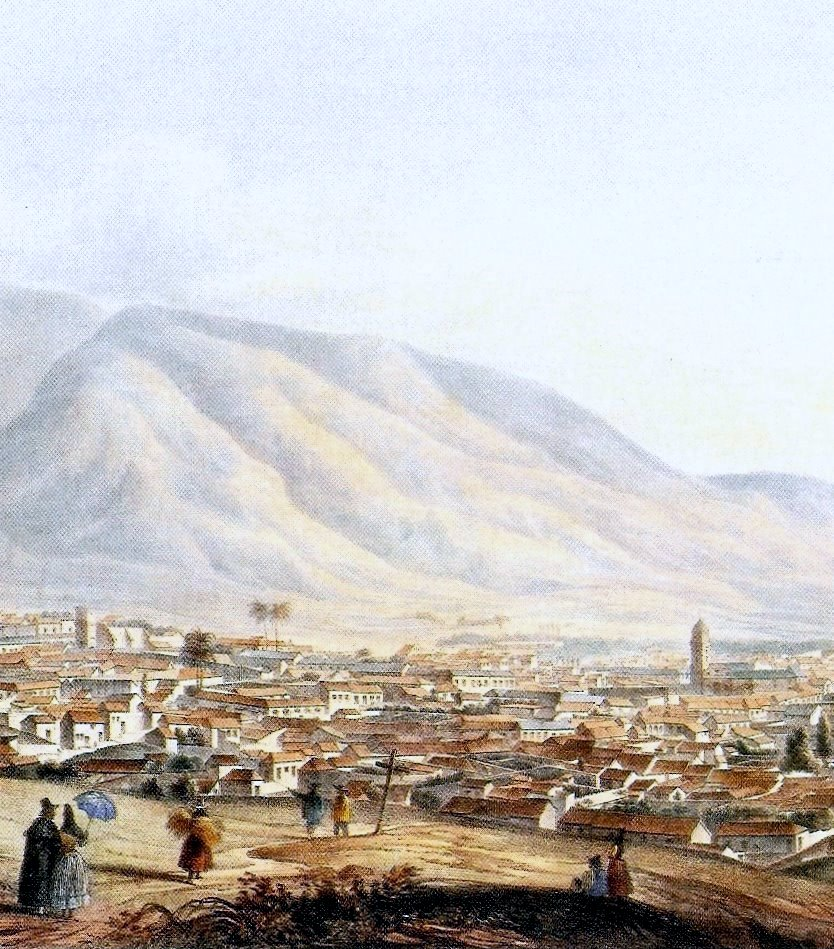
Caracas in 1839

In 1728, the Guipuzcoan Company of Caracas was founded by the king, and the cacao business grew in importance. Caracas was made one of the three provinces of Nueva Granada, corresponding to Venezuela, in 1739. Over the next three decades the Viceroyalty was variously split, with Caracas province becoming the Venezuela province. Luis de Unzaga created the Captaincy General of Venezuela in the summer of 1777, with Caracas as the capital. Venezuela then attempted to become independent, first with the 1797 Gual and España conspiracy, based in Caracas, and then the successful 1811 Venezuelan Declaration of Independence. Caracas then came under worse luck: in 1812, an earthquake destroyed Caracas, a quarter of its population migrated in 1814, and the Venezuelan War of Independence continued until 24 June 1821, when Simón Bolívar defeated royalists in the Battle of Carabobo. Urban reforms only took place towards the end of the 19th century, under Antonio Guzmán Blanco: some landmarks were built, but the city remained distinctly colonial until the 1930s.

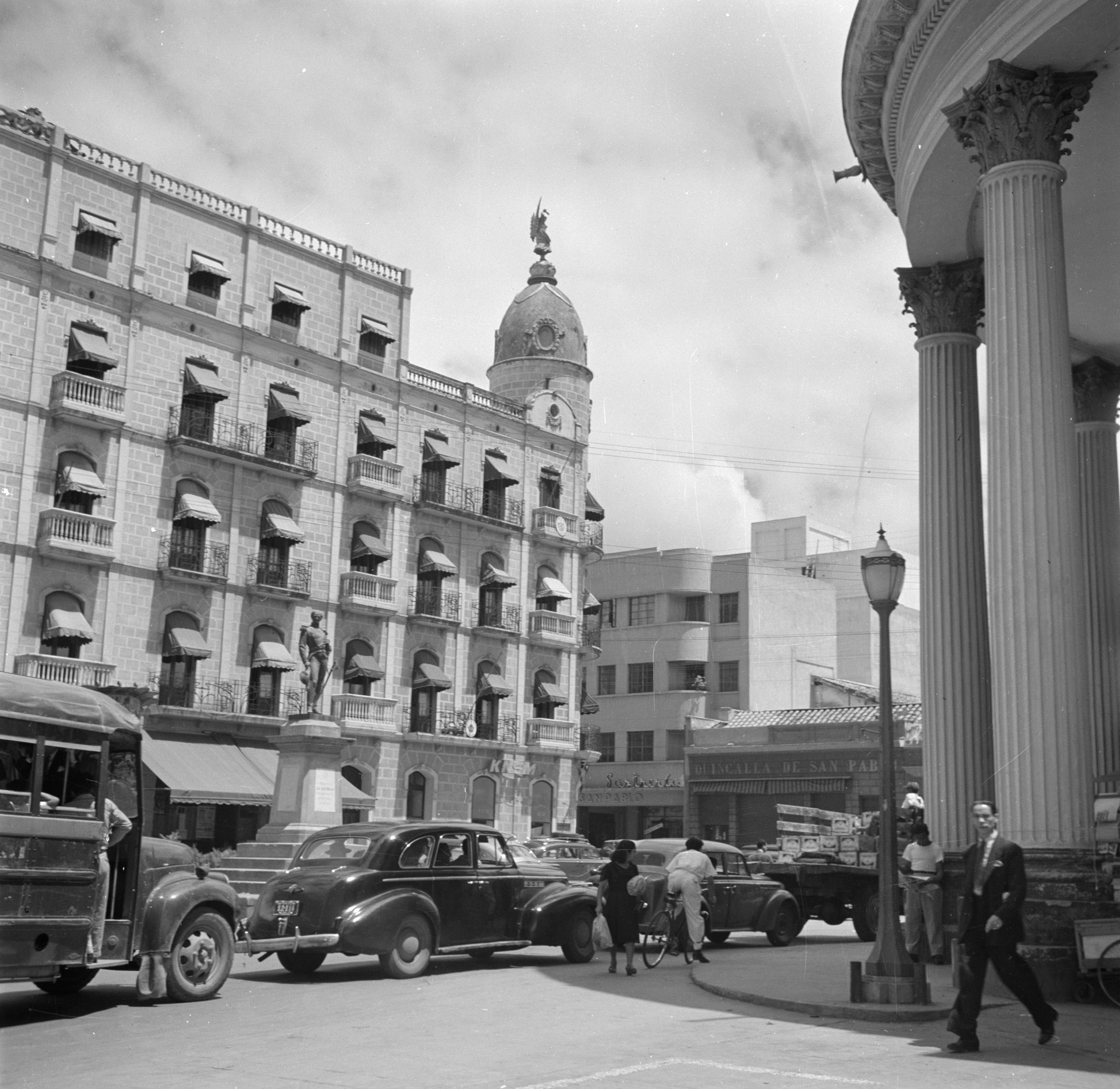
Caracas in 1950

Caracas grew in size, population, and economic importance during Venezuela's oil boom in the early 20th century. In the 1950s, the metropolitan area of Gran Caracas was developed, and the city began an intensive modernization program, funding public buildings, which continued throughout the 1960s and early 1970s. Cultural landmarks, like the University City of Caracas, designed by modernist architect Carlos Raúl Villanueva and declared a World Heritage Site by UNESCO in 2000; the Caracas Museum of Contemporary Art; and the Teresa Carreño Cultural Complex were built, as well as the Caracas Metro and a developed downtown area. Urban development was rapid, leading to the growth of slums on the hillsides surrounding the new city. Much of the city development also fell into disrepair come the end of the 20th century, with the 1980s oil glut and political instability like the Caracazo, meaning maintenance can not be sustained. The economic and social problems persist throughout the capital and country, characterized as the crisis in Venezuela. By 2017, Caracas was the most violent city in the world. On 3 January 2026, the United States launched strikes on Caracas and captured President Nicolás Maduro, and his wife, First Lady Cilia Flores, and removed them from the country to New York City for criminal prosecution on narcoterrorism charges.

On 24 June 2026, the city was struck by a powerful earthquake doublet causing widespread damage, killing and injuring many.

== Coat of arms ==
The previous coat of arms was adopted in 1591. Simón de Bolívar, an ancestor of Venezuelan liberator Simón Bolívar, had been named the first prosecutor general of the Venezuelan province in 1589. He served as the representative of Venezuela to the Spanish Crown, and vice versa. In 1591, de Bolívar introduced a petition to King Philip II for a coat of arms, which he granted by Royal Cedula on 4 September that year in San Lorenzo. The coat of arms represents the city's name with the red Santiago (St. James') cross. It originally depicted "a brown bear rampant on a field of silver, holding between its paws a golden shell with the red cross of Santiago; and its seal is a crown with five golden points". In the same act, the king declared Caracas as "The Most Noble and Very Loyal City of Santiago de León de Caracas".

Until 2022, the anthem of the city was Marcha a Caracas, written by the composer Tiero Pezzuti de Matteis with the lyrics by José Enrique Sarabia and approved in 1984.

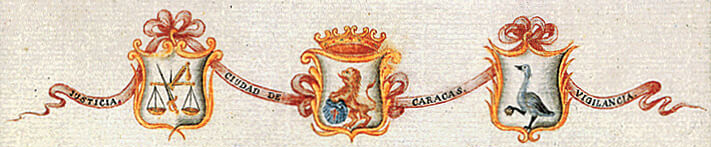
In the center, the (colonial) coat of arms of Caracas. On its left, a shield representing 'Justice', and on the right, 'Vigilance'. c. 1775, by Joseph Carlos de Aguero. General Archive of the Indies, Seville.

== Geography ==
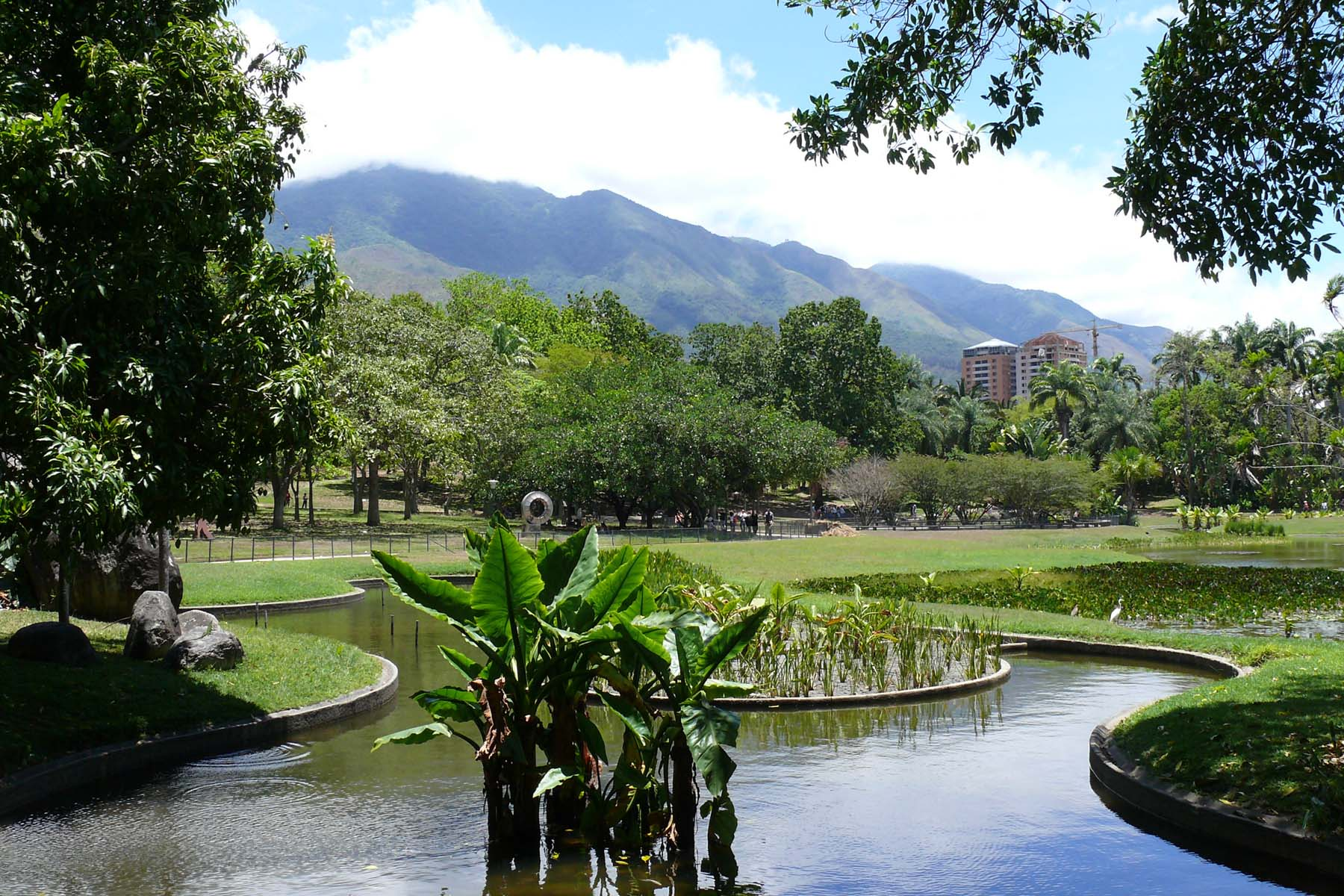
Ávila national park, seen from Parque del Este

Caracas is contained entirely within a valley of the Venezuelan Central Range, and is separated from the Caribbean coast by a roughly 15-kilometer (9 mi) expanse of El Ávila National Park. The valley is relatively small and quite irregular. The altitude varies between 870 and 1,043 meters (2,854 and 3,422 ft) above sea level; the historic center lies at about 900 meters (3,000 feet) above sea level. This, along with the rapid population growth, has profoundly influenced the urban development of the city. The most elevated point of the Capital District, wherein the city is located, is the Pico El Ávila, which rises to 2,159 meters (7,083 feet).

The main body of water in Caracas is the Guaire River, which flows across the city and empties into the Tuy River, which is also fed by the El Valle and San Pedro rivers, in addition to numerous streams which descend from El Ávila. The La Mariposa and Camatagua reservoirs provide water to the city. The city is occasionally subject to earthquakes – notably in 1641, 1812, 1967 and 2026.

Geologically, Caracas was formed in the Late Cretaceous period, with much of the rest of the Caribbean, and sits on what is mostly metamorphic rock. Deformation of the land in this period formed the region.

=== Climate ===
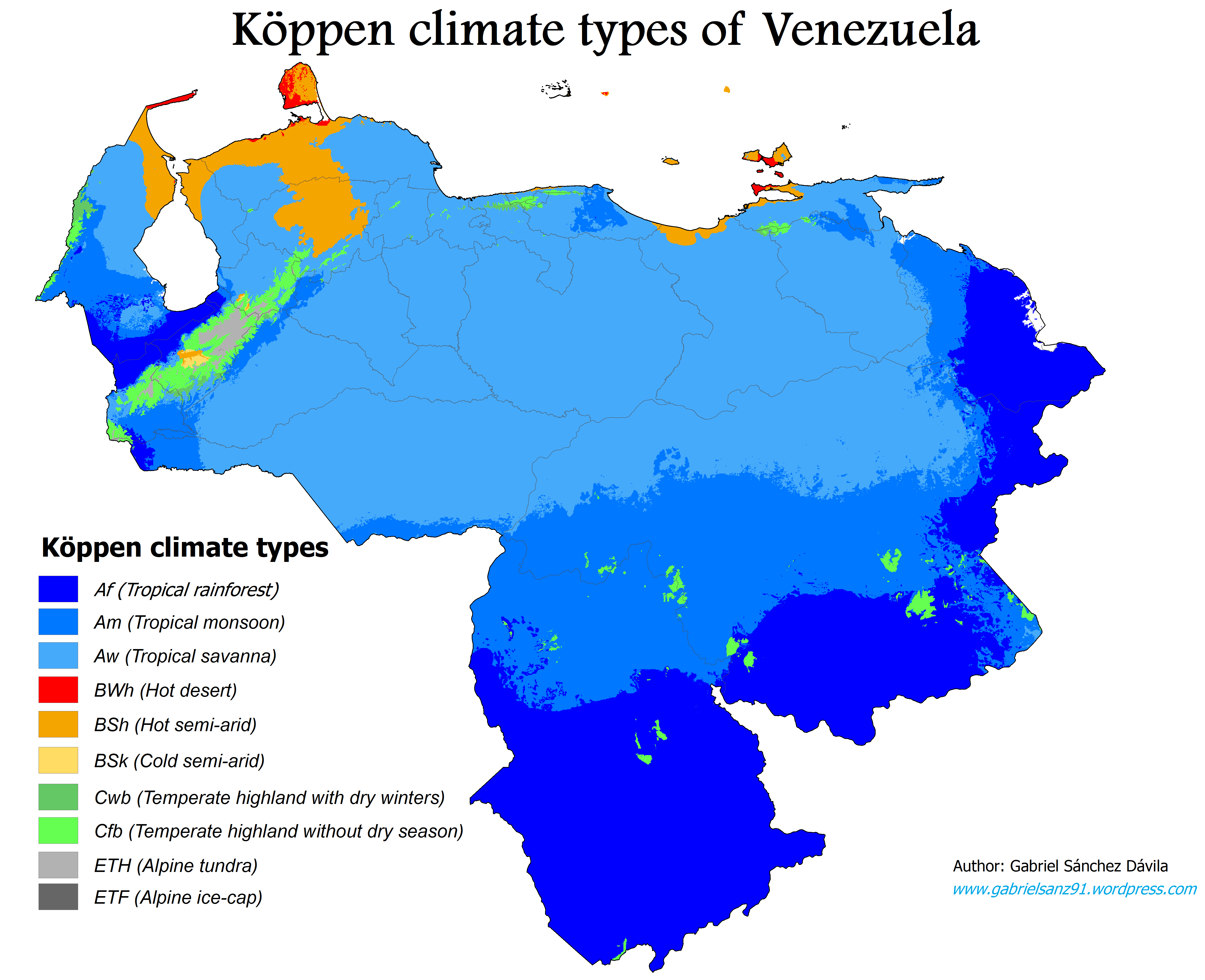
Köppen map of Caracas and surrounding areas:
- Tropical savanna (Aw)
- Subtropical highland with uniform rainfall (Cfb)
- Subtropical highland with monsoon influence (Cwb)

Under the Köppen climate classification, Caracas has a tropical savanna climate (Aw), milder due to the elevation and within the Venezuelan Coastal Range (Maritime Andes). Caracas precipitation varies between 900 and 1,300 millimeters (35 and 51 inches) (annual), in the city proper to 2,000 millimeters (79 inches) in some parts of the Mountain range. While Caracas is within the tropics, due to its altitude, temperatures are cooler compared to other locations with a typical tropical savanna climate. The annual average temperature is approximately 23.4 °C (74 °F). The average of the coldest month, January, is 21.7 °C (71 °F). The average of the warmest month, May, is 24.5 °C (76 °F), which gives a small annual thermal amplitude of 2.8 °C (5.0 °F).

In December and January abundant fog may appear, in addition to a sudden nightly drop in temperature, until reaching 8 °C (46 °F). This peculiar weather is known by the natives of Caracas as the Pacheco. Nightly temperatures year round are much (7 to 11 °C) lower than daytime highs and usually do not remain above 24 °C (75 °F), resulting in very pleasant evening temperatures. Hailstorms appear in Caracas, although only on rare occasions. Electrical storms are much more frequent, especially between June and October, due to the city being in a closed valley and the orographic action of Cerro El Ávila.

Climate data for Caracas, Venezuela (La Carlota) (1991-2020 normals, extremes 1964-present)
Month	Jan	Feb	Mar	Apr	May	Jun	Jul	Aug	Sep	Oct	Nov	Dec	Year
Record high °C (°F)	33.8 (92.8)	34.4 (93.9)	35.3 (95.5)	35.8 (96.4)	35.8 (96.4)	35.3 (95.5)	34.4 (93.9)	34.4 (93.9)	37.1 (98.8)	34.5 (94.1)	34.8 (94.6)	31.9 (89.4)	37.1 (98.8)
Mean daily maximum °C (°F)	27.1 (80.8)	27.6 (81.7)	28.6 (83.5)	29.3 (84.7)	29.4 (84.9)	28.5 (83.3)	28.0 (82.4)	28.3 (82.9)	28.8 (83.8)	28.6 (83.5)	28.1 (82.6)	27.1 (80.8)	28.3 (82.9)
Daily mean °C (°F)	21.7 (71.1)	22.1 (71.8)	23.1 (73.6)	24.1 (75.4)	24.5 (76.1)	24.1 (75.4)	23.5 (74.3)	23.7 (74.7)	24.3 (75.7)	24.1 (75.4)	23.5 (74.3)	22.3 (72.1)	23.4 (74.1)
Mean daily minimum °C (°F)	17.3 (63.1)	17.7 (63.9)	18.5 (65.3)	20.0 (68.0)	21.2 (70.2)	21.0 (69.8)	20.5 (68.9)	20.8 (69.4)	20.9 (69.6)	20.8 (69.4)	20.3 (68.5)	18.6 (65.5)	19.8 (67.6)
Record low °C (°F)	10.0 (50.0)	6.0 (42.8)	5.1 (41.2)	12.5 (54.5)	13.1 (55.6)	14.9 (58.8)	14.1 (57.4)	14.3 (57.7)	15.5 (59.9)	13.1 (55.6)	11.9 (53.4)	10.0 (50.0)	5.1 (41.2)
Average precipitation mm (inches)	56.1 (2.21)	42.5 (1.67)	20.7 (0.81)	48.1 (1.89)	70.2 (2.76)	112.6 (4.43)	121.1 (4.77)	132.7 (5.22)	118.4 (4.66)	144.3 (5.68)	130.0 (5.12)	107.4 (4.23)	1,104.1 (43.45)
Average precipitation days (≥ 1 mm)	3.9	2.9	2.2	4.3	7.1	11.0	12.7	12.2	9.4	11.1	8.7	7.0	92.5
Average relative humidity (%)	78	76	74	76	78	80	80	81	82	80	82	81	79
Average dew point °C (°F)	18.2 (64.8)	17.8 (64.0)	18.1 (64.6)	19.5 (67.1)	20.1 (68.2)	20.2 (68.4)	20.2 (68.4)	20.6 (69.1)	20.8 (69.4)	21.0 (69.8)	20.9 (69.6)	19.5 (67.1)	19.7 (67.5)
Mean monthly sunshine hours	229.4	215.6	235.6	183.0	182.9	183.0	210.8	217.0	213.0	210.8	210.0	213.9	2,505
Source: NOAA (humidity and sun 1964-1990), Weather.Directory

=== Hydrography ===
The hydrographic network of the city of Caracas is made up of the Guaire river basin which is a sub-basin of the Tuy river. This basin crosses the valley where the city is located from West to East (Las Adjuntas – Petare). It covers about 655 square kilometers, about 45 km. long and about 15 km. wide, has a rectangular shape. The basin is formed by the Caracas Valley, which is relatively high, narrow and long, surrounded by the high and steep Cordillera de la Costa, which runs parallel to the Litoral.

Among the characteristics of the hydrographic network associated with the city of Caracas is the high degree of contamination present in the lower parts of the Guaire River due to its tributaries having been used for sewage collection since 1874, during the government of Antonio Guzmán Blanco, until today. The level of contamination is such that it does not allow the maintenance of the life of the species that once populated the basin, and it has become extinct or has been restricted to the highest areas of the basin, mainly within the boundaries of El Ávila National Park. Awareness for the recovery of the basin has recently begun, however, much remains to be done before results can be observed.

Among the main rivers and streams that make up the basin are in its northern slope: San Pedro River, Macarao River, Quebrada Caroata, Catuche River, Anauco River, Chacaito River, Tocome River, Caurimare River; on its southern slope we find that among the main tributaries are: El Valle river, Quebrada Baruta and Quebrada La Guairita. In the upper part of the basin there are two reservoirs with the purpose of supplying water to the western part of the city; These are the Macarao Dam and the La Mariposa Reservoir.

== Urbanism ==
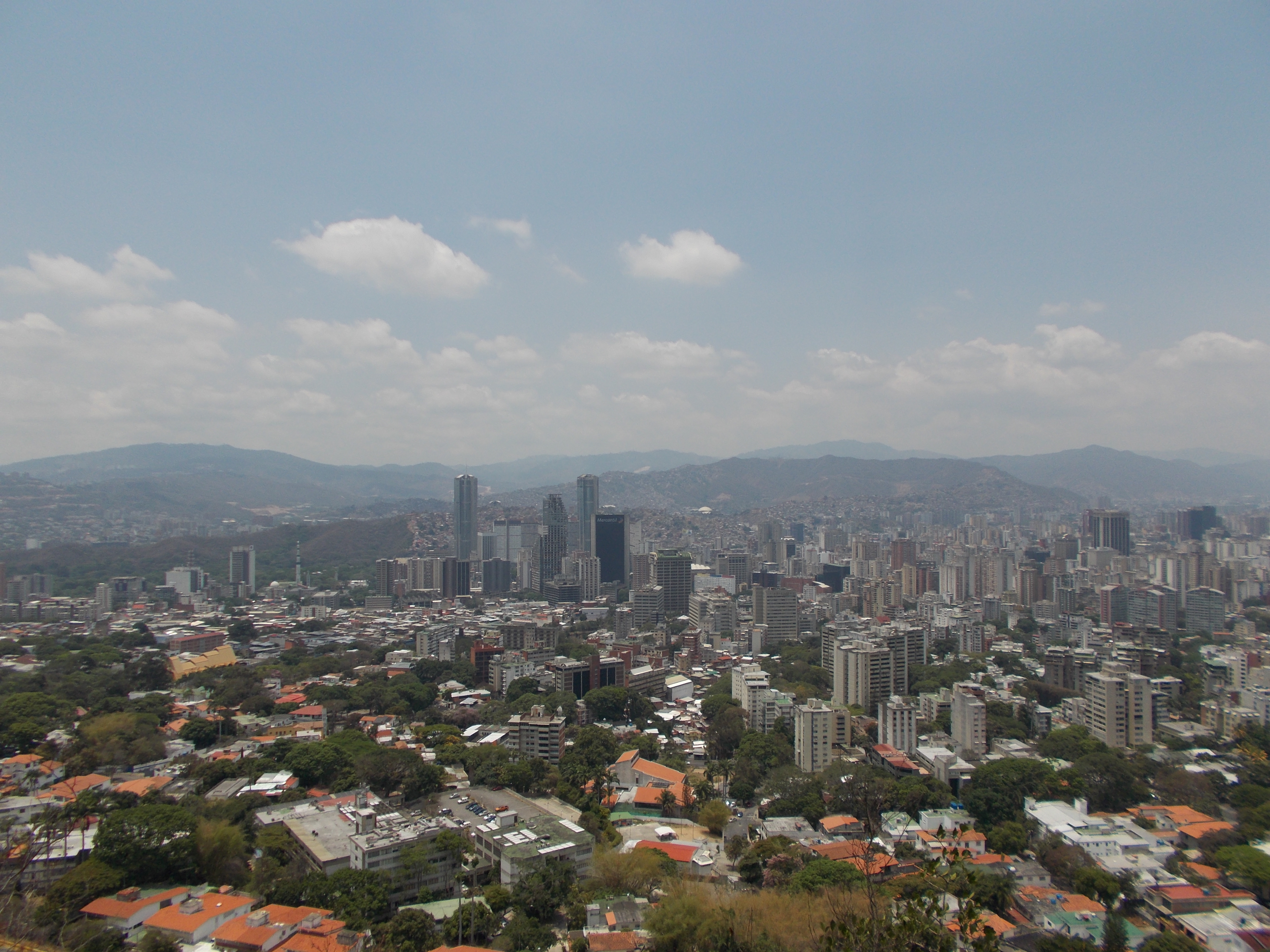
Caracas seen from the Avila National Park

Caracas shares commonalities with many Latin American cities: densely populated and with limited space because it is surrounded by mountains. Because of this, the city has grown vertically. A very striking aspect is the number of people living in substandard housing built on the mountain slopes surrounding the city. This type of housing is called ranchos, built improvised, without any official planning, with deficiencies and inadequate materials, marking a difference to those who live in the valley proper; 45% of the population lives in these settlements, which comprise in 25% of the urban area.

The city center, developed around a small historic center, represents less than a quarter of the total area of the city, which has spread along the valley and has also been connected in recent years with satellite cities in the states of Miranda and La Guaira, creating a major metropolitan area known as Gran Caracas. The city's rapid population growth has resulted in increasing traffic congestion. To this end, the subway transportation system (Metro de Caracas) has been progressively expanded and is currently linked to the Los Teques Metro and, in the future, to the Guarenas-Guatire Metro system. The "Ezequiel Zamora" Central Railway System also links the communities of Charallave and Cúa de los Valles del Tuy with the subway transportation system of the capital city.

Some areas of the city have a grid layout, either inherited from the colony or developed during the urban projects of the 20th century. Other areas, built on the mountain slopes, do not follow this pattern, but adapt to the irregularities of the terrain. These elevated areas enjoy a temperate temperature throughout the year.

== Demographics ==
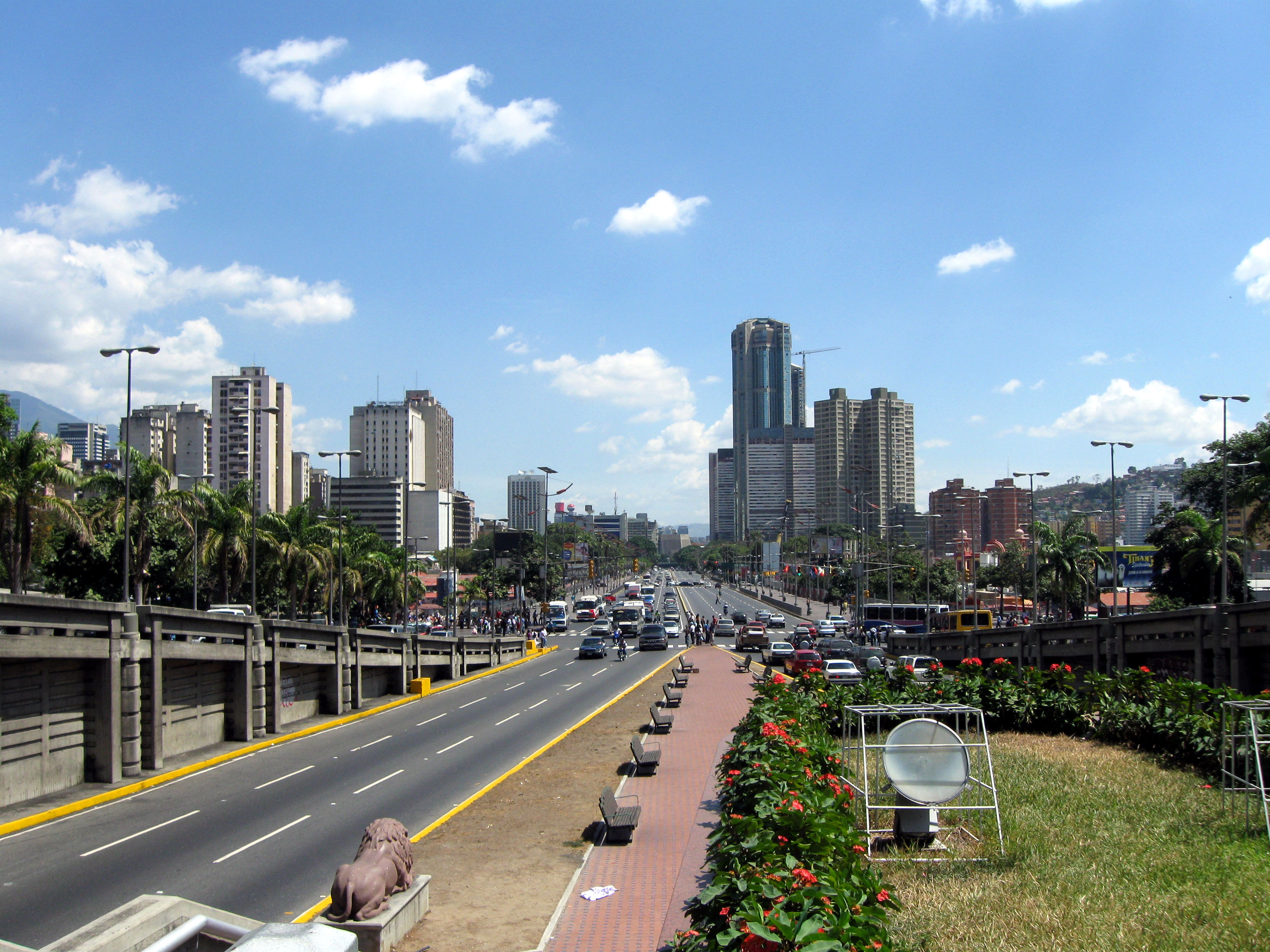
Bolivar Avenue

In 2011, the city proper of Caracas (Distrito Capital) had over 1.9 million inhabitants. The Metropolitan District of Caracas had an estimated 2.9 million in 2011. In 2025, the population of Caracas proper is over 3 million. The majority of the population is mixed-race, typically with varying degrees of European, Indigenous, African and occasionally Asian ancestry. There is also a notable Afro-Venezuelan community. The city has been shaped by a rich mix of ethnic, racial, and cultural groups throughout its history.

=== Immigration ===
During the 1940s and 1950s, after the Second World War, a growing wave of European immigrants began to settle in the country, primarily Spanish, Italian, and Portuguese people, with smaller communities of Germans (Colonia Tovar), French, English, Serbs and Jews. Because of this, Caracas has a large number of European Venezuelans who descend from this influx of immigration. In particular, there are descendants of Spanish, Portuguese, Italian, Serbian, Chinese, Colombian, German, Syrian, and Lebanese people in Caracas.

During the early 1960s, President Rómulo Betancourt followed the same policy as the Marcos Pérez Jiménez administration: promoting immigration, especially from Latin American countries. These policies were maintained until the late 1980s, with a notable influx of Argentines, Uruguayans, Chileans, Cubans, Peruvians, Ecuadorians, Chinese, and Arabs. Towards the beginning of the 1980s, immigration was marked by a strong influx of Colombians.

=== Growth ===
Caracas has exceeded the administrative limits of its perimeter due to accelerated population growth, so that its most suitable demographic study territory is the Metropolitan District or AMC. According to 2011 calculations by the National Institute of Statistics, the metropolitan city had a population for the 2011 census of 2,923,959 inhabitants. The Metropolitan District represents less than 1% of the national territory and is home to one-fifteenth of Venezuela's population. In percentage numbers, 9.2% of Venezuela's population lives in the five capital municipalities, out of the 335 municipalities that comprise Venezuela.

The region is called Greater Caracas or the Metropolitan Region of Caracas, and includes satellite cities and areas like Altos Mirandinos, the central coast of La Guaira, Guarenas, Guatire and Valles del Tuy. This agglomeration had an estimated population of 4.3 million inhabitants in 2011.

In the 20th century, an exodus of the peasantry to the capital and other cities intensified, motivated by a search for improvements in their quality of life. This led to depopulation of the rural areas of the country and demographic crowding of the centers. This caused more impoverished settlements in the outskirts of the city to expand; however Caracas still had the lowest unemployment rates in the entire country. In 1936, the total population of Venezuela had been the same as the estimated population of Greater Caracas in 2000: almost 4 million inhabitants. From 1936 to 1990, Caracas multiplied its population, although far less than other major cities such as Valencia, which in the same period multiplied its population by almost 25 times.

=== Crime ===
Venezuela and its capital, Caracas, have been reported to both have among the highest per capita murder rates in the world. In 2010 Caracas had the highest murder rate in the world, having more deaths than Baghdad during the Iraq War.

In 2019, Caracas was the city with the sixth highest homicide rate in the world outside of a warzone, with a rate of around 76 murders per 100,000 people. In 2023 it was the nineteenth, with a rate of around 52 murders per 100,000 people. Most murders and other violent crimes go unsolved, with estimates of the number of unresolved crimes as high as 98%.

== Economy ==
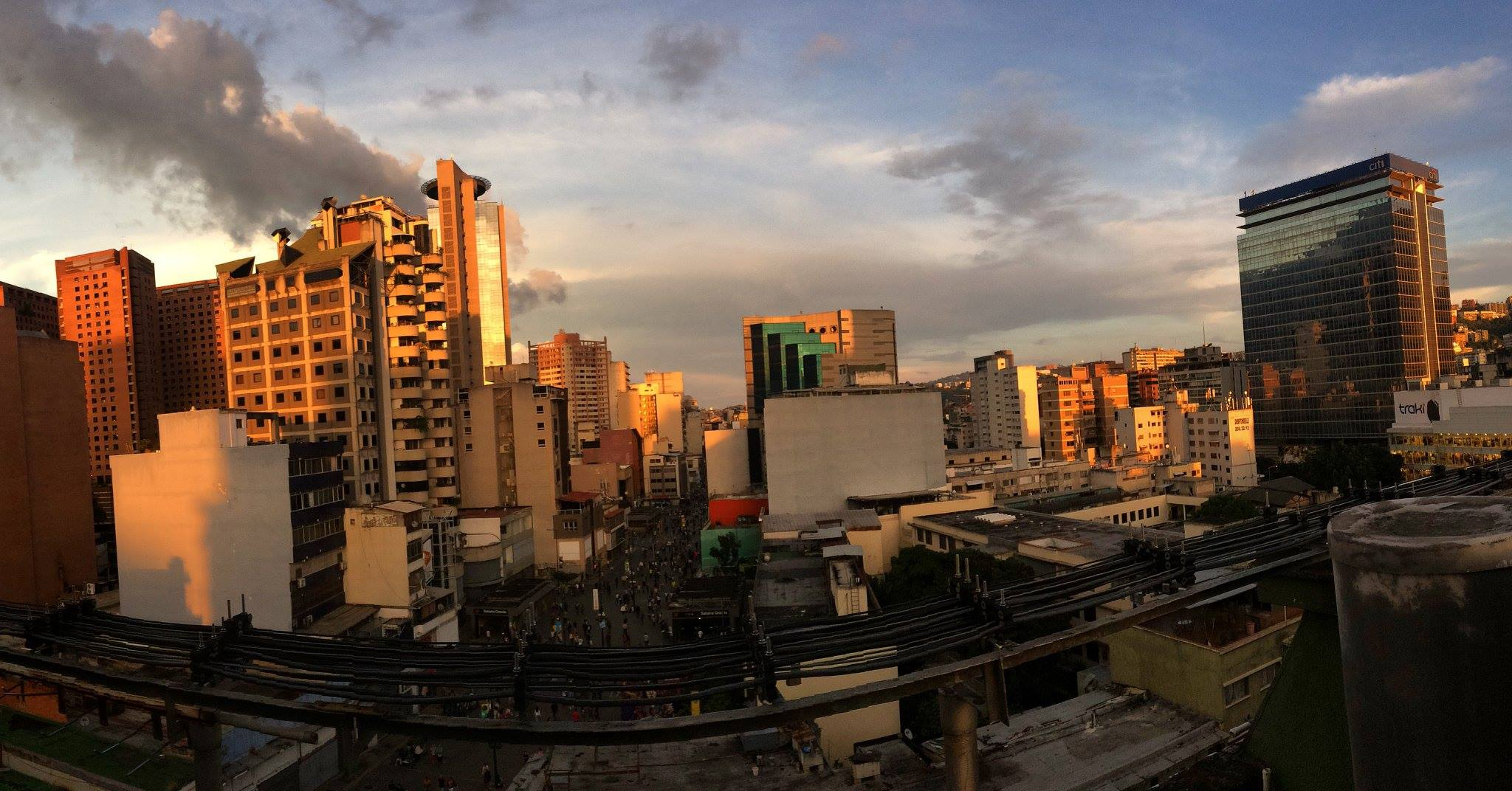
The Sabana Grande area

Businesses that are located in Caracas include service companies, banks, and malls, among others. It has a largely service-based economy, apart from some industrial activity in its metropolitan area. The Caracas Stock Exchange and Petróleos de Venezuela (PDVSA) are headquartered here. PDVSA, a state-run organization, is the largest company in Venezuela, and negotiates all the international agreements for the distribution and export of petroleum. When it existed, the airline Viasa had its headquarters in the Torre Viasa.

Several international companies and embassies are located in El Rosal and Las Mercedes, in the Caracas area. The city also serves as a hub for communication and transportation infrastructure between the metropolitan area and the rest of the country. Important industries in Caracas include chemicals, textiles, leather, food, iron, and wood products. There are also rubber and cement factories. Its nominal GDP is US$70 billion and the GDP (PPP) per capita is US$24,000.

A 2009 United Nations survey reported that the cost of living in Caracas was 89% of that of the survey's baseline city, New York.

=== Tourism ===
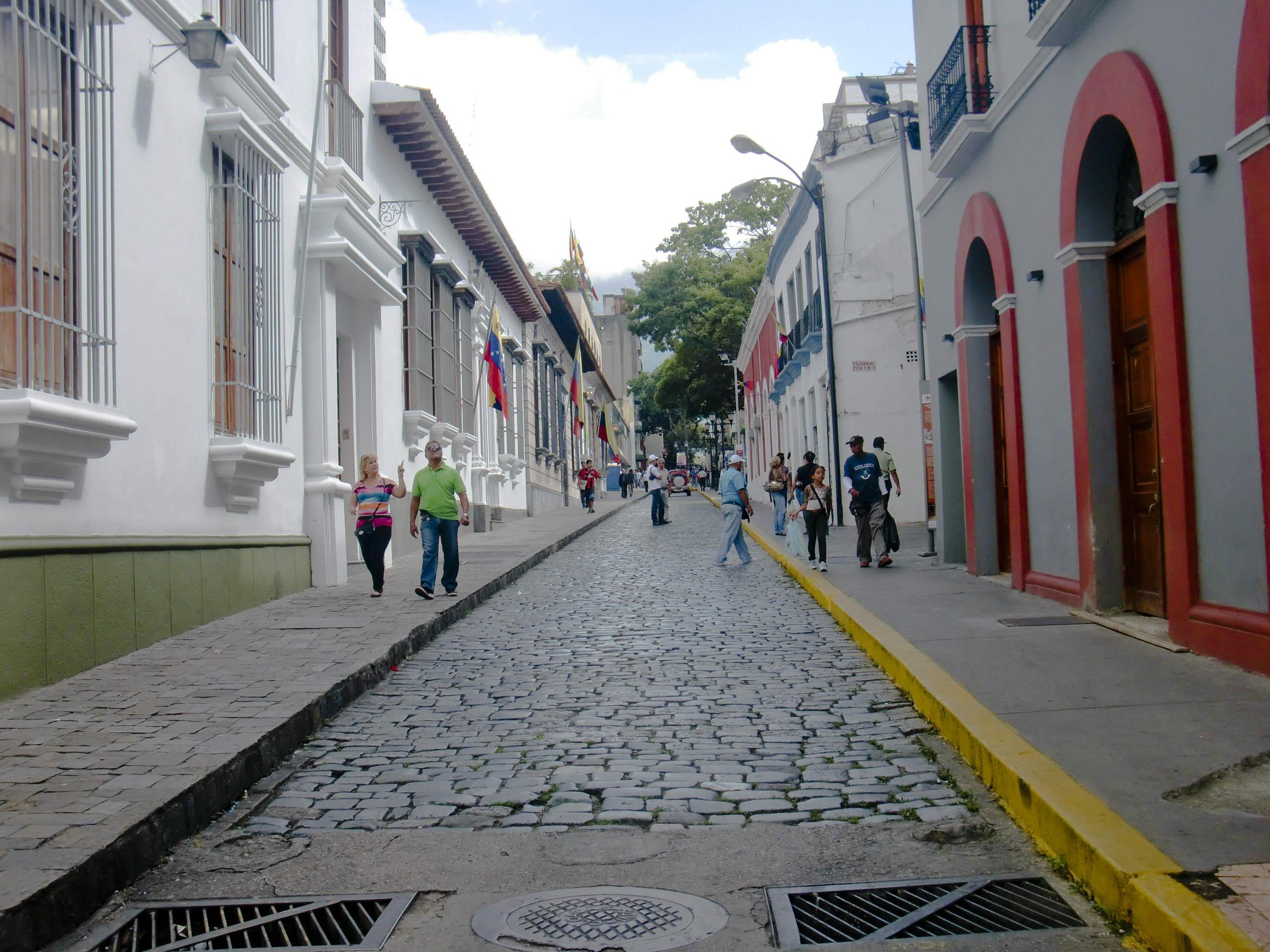
The historic center of Caracas

In 2013, the World Economic Forum evaluated countries for Travel and Tourism competitiveness. Out of the 140 countries evaluated, Venezuela came 113th. Factors that contributed to the ranking included safety and security concerns and the low prioritisation of the tourism industry.

In an attempt to attract more foreign visitors, the Venezuelan Ministry of Tourism invested in multiple hotel infrastructures. The largest hotel investment has been in the Hotel Alba Caracas. The cost for the general maintenance of the north and south towers of the hotel is approximately 231.5 million Venezuelan bolivars. Although the Venezuelan Ministry of Tourism has taken the initiative to recognize the importance of the tourism industry, the Venezuelan government has not placed the tourism industry as an economic priority. In 2013, the budget for the Ministry of Tourism was only 173.8 million bolivars, while the Ministry of the Youth received approximately 724.6 million bolivars. The tourism industry in Venezuela contributes approximately 3.8 percent of the country GDP. The World Economic Forum predicts Venezuela's GDP to rise to 4.2 percent by 2022.

== Government ==
On 8 March 2000, the year after a new constitution was introduced in Venezuela, it was decreed in Gaceta Official N° 36,906 that the Metropolitan District of Caracas would be created and that some of the powers of the Libertador, Chacao, Baruta, Sucre, and El Hatillo municipalities would be delegated to the Alcaldía Mayor, physically located in the large Libertador municipality, in the center of the city. The Metropolitan District of Caracas was suppressed on 20 December 2017 by the Constituent National Assembly of Venezuela.

=== Capital District ===
In the case of the Libertador Municipality of Caracas, the only member of the Capital District, the executive authority rests with the head of government of the Capital District, a position designated by the president of the republic.

According to Article 3 of the Capital District Law, the legislative function is exercised directly by the Republic through the National Assembly of Venezuela.

Article 3. The special regime of the Capital District is a government system constituted by an executive body exercised by a Head of Government, and the legislative function will be in charge of the National Assembly.

Before the creation of the Metropolitan District, the Federal District (current Capital District) had a governor appointed by the president of the republic, while the Caracas municipalities of the State of Miranda governed with their respective mayors in isolation, without any coordinating entity. In April 2009, the National Assembly reformed the Capital District Law, legalizing the constitution of a head of government or governor for the Libertador municipality designated by the National Executive.

Using as an argument what is established in article 156 of the constitution:

Article 156. It is the competence of the National Public Power: 10. The organization and regime of the Capital District and federal dependencies.

=== Metropolitan District ===
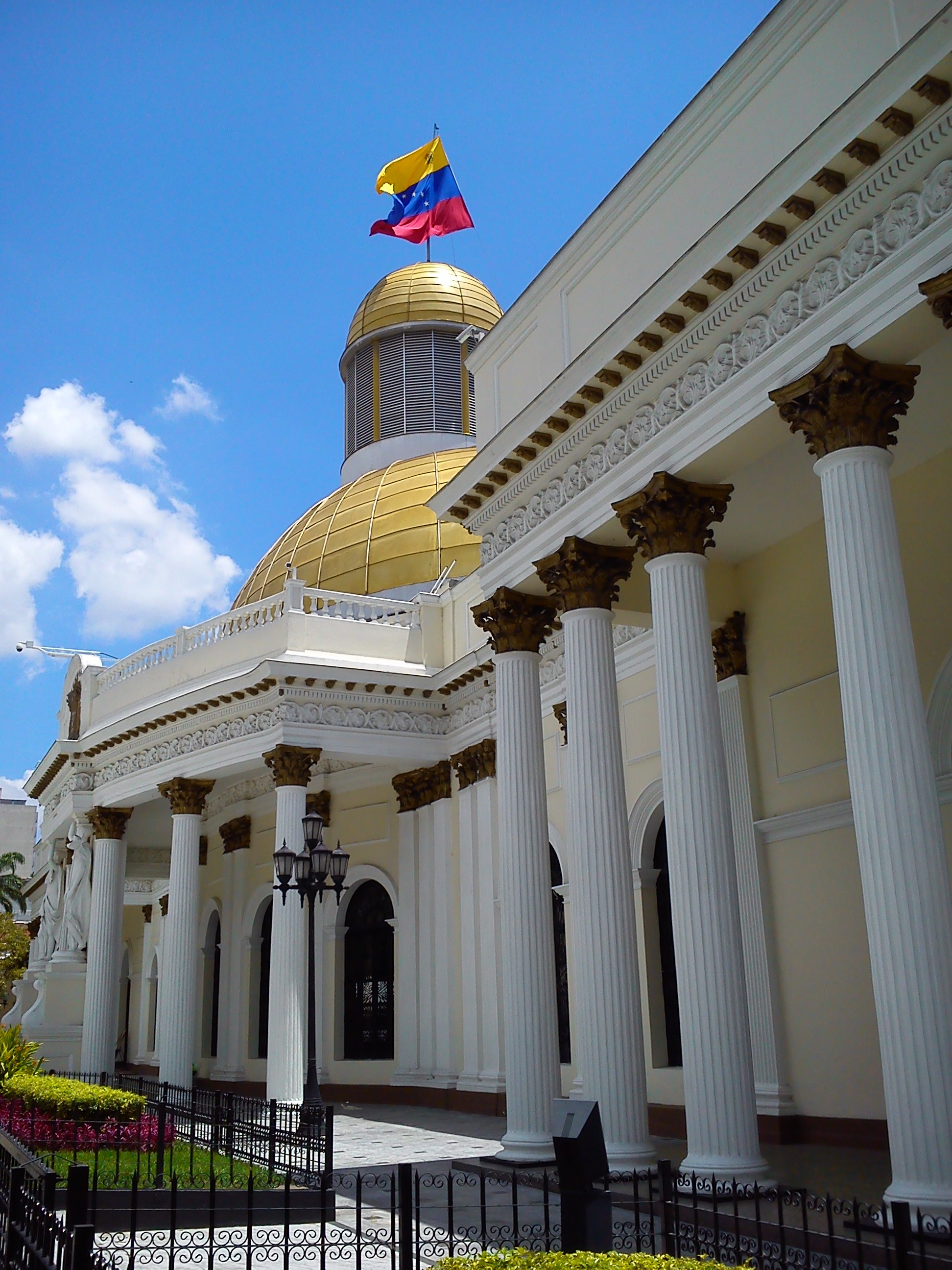
Federal Legislative Palace, Seat of the National Parliament

The city of Caracas occupies the entirety of the Libertador municipality of the Capital District and part of the state of Miranda, specifically the municipalities of Baruta, Chacao, El Hatillo and Sucre, which until 2011 formed the Metropolitan District of Caracas, which enjoyed legal personality and autonomy within the limits of the Constitution and the law.

Until that year, the Metropolitan Mayor was the first civil, political and administrative authority of the city of Caracas, as well as the municipal mayors in each of the municipalities comprising it. The Metropolitan District of Caracas was organized in a system of municipal government at two levels: the metropolitan or district and the municipalities.

== Culture ==
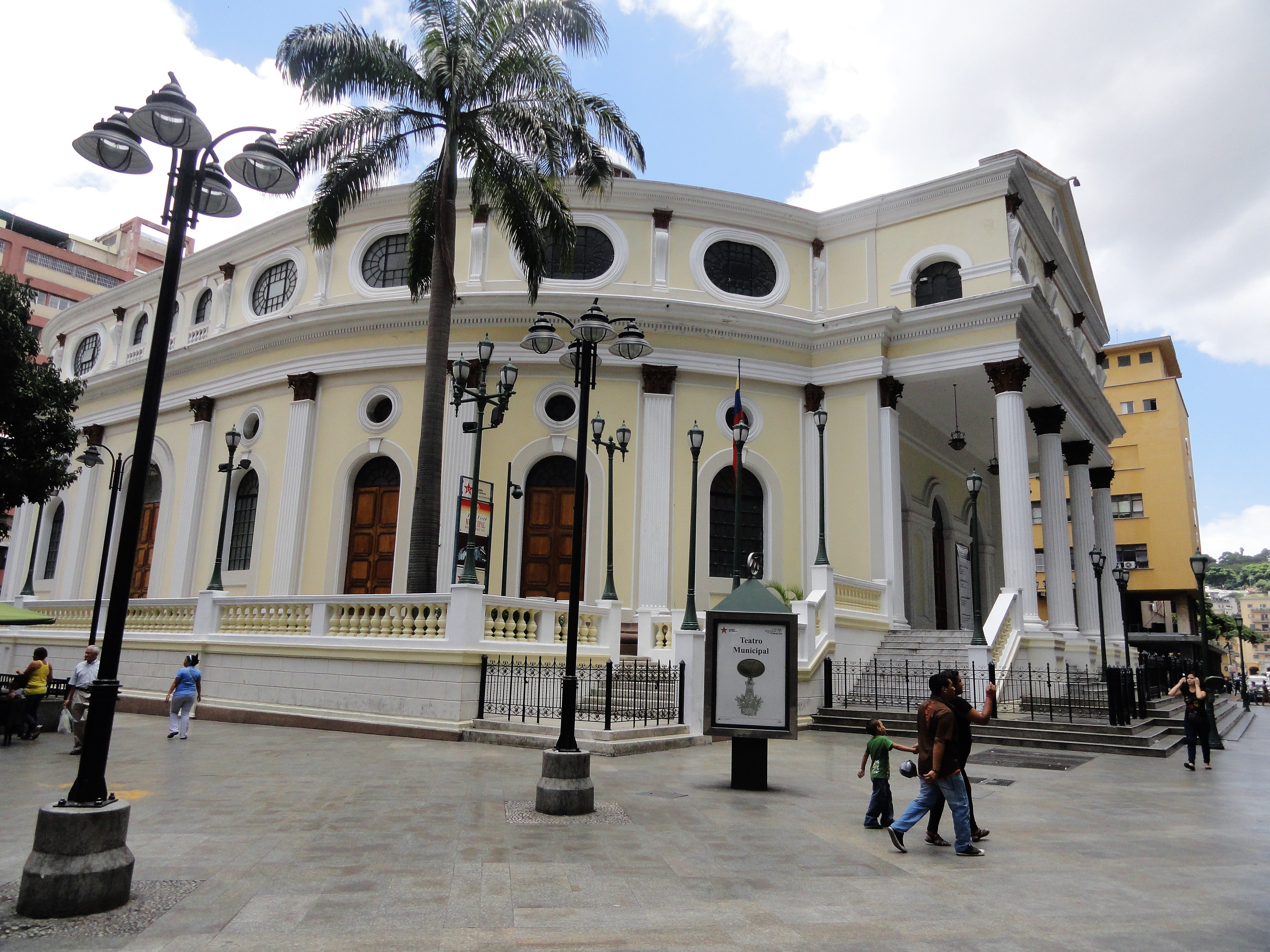
Municipal Theatre of Caracas

Caracas is Venezuela's largest city and cultural capital with restaurants, theaters, museums, and shopping centers found throughout the city. It is home to many immigrants from Spain, Italy, Portugal, the Middle East, Germany, China, Trinidad, and other Latin American countries.

=== Music ===
The Simón Bolívar Symphony Orchestra is based in Caracas. Originally a youth orchestra, it is connected with the Fundación Musical Simón Bolívar (FMSB), known colloquially as El Sistema, Venezuela's social action music programme. The Guardian wrote that the orchestra represented "a message of social inclusion and the manifest power of music to bring communities together".

=== Sports ===
Professional sports teams in the city include the football clubs Caracas Fútbol Club, Deportivo Petare, Atlético Venezuela, SD Centro Italo Venezolano, Estrella Roja FC and Deportivo La Guaira. Deportivo Petare has reached the semi-finals of international tournaments, such as the Copa Libertadores, while the Caracas Fútbol Club has reached the quarterfinals. Baseball team Leones del Caracas plays at the Monumental Stadium with a capacity of 40,000 spectators, while the Tiburones de La Guaira plays at University Stadium, with a capacity of nearly 26,000 spectators.

The football stadiums in the city include the Olympic Stadium, home to Caracas Fútbol Club and Deportivo La Guaira, with a capacity of 30,000 spectators, and the Brígido Iriarte Stadium, home to Atlético Venezuela, with a capacity of 12,000 spectators. In basketball, the Cocodrilos de Caracas play their games in the Gimnasio José Beracasa in the El Paraíso neighborhood.

Caracas is the seat of the National Institute of Sports and of the Venezuelan Olympic Committee. The city hosted the 1983 Pan American Games.

=== Media ===
Some of the largest media companies of Venezuela are based in Caracas, including:

- Correo del Orinoco (2009)
- El Nacional (Venezuela)
- El Universal (Caracas)
- Diario VEA
- Diario 2001
- Tal Cual
- Diario Meridiano
- TVes
- Venevisión
- Vale TV
- Venezolana de Televisión
- Televen
- RCTV
- ViVe
- Globovisión
- Avila TV
- Telesur
- Canal i
- TV Familia
- Catia TVe
- Meridiano Televisión
- Asamblea Nacional Televisión
- Ve Plus TV

== Education ==
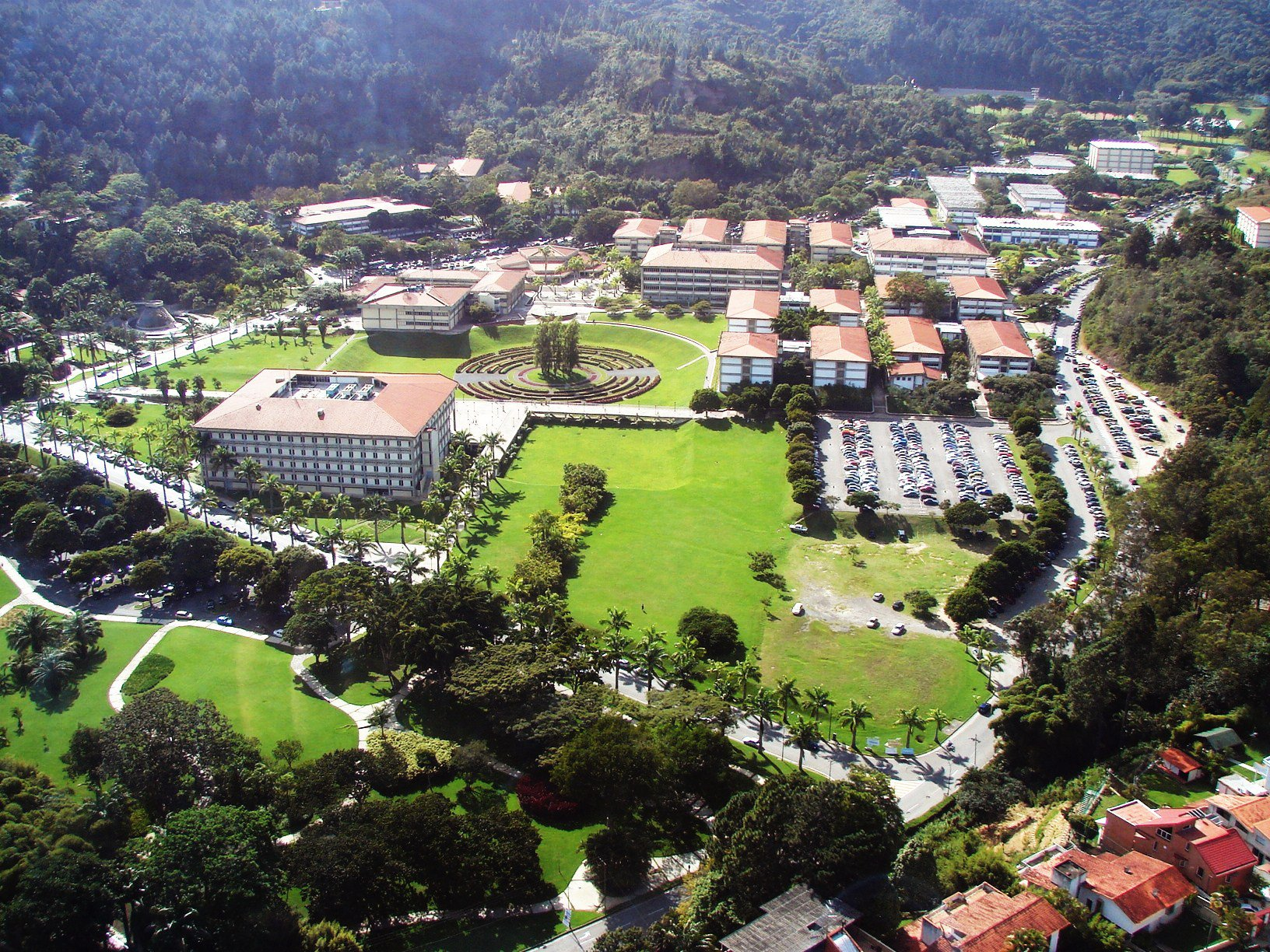
Simón Bolívar University, Caracas

=== Central University of Venezuela ===
The Central University of Venezuela (Universidad Central de Venezuela, UCV) is a public university founded in 1721: it is the oldest university in Venezuela. The university campus was designed by architect Carlos Raúl Villanueva and declared a UNESCO World Heritage Site in 2000.

=== Simón Bolívar University ===
The Simón Bolívar University (Universidad Simón Bolívar, USB) is a public institution in Caracas that focuses on science and technology.

=== Other universities ===
- Bolivarian Military University of Venezuela (Main Campus)
- Universidad Católica Andrés Bello
- Universidad Nacional Experimental de la Gran Caracas
- Universidad Metropolitana
- Universidad Nacional Experimental de las Artes (UNEARTE)
- Universidad Monteávila
- Universidad Nueva Esparta
- Universidad Santa Maria
- Universidad Alejandro de Humboldt
- Universidad Nacional Experimental de las Fuerzas Armadas
- Universidad Nacional Experimental Simón Rodríguez
- Universidad Bolivariana de Venezuela
- Universidad José María Vargas
- Universidad Pedagógica Experimental Libertador
- Universidad Experimental Politécnica Antonio José de Sucre

=== International schools ===
- British School of Caracas
- Colegio Internacional de Caracas
- Escuela Campo Alegre
- International Christian School
- Tomchei Tmimim
- Lycée Français de Caracas – Colegio Francia

== Transportation ==
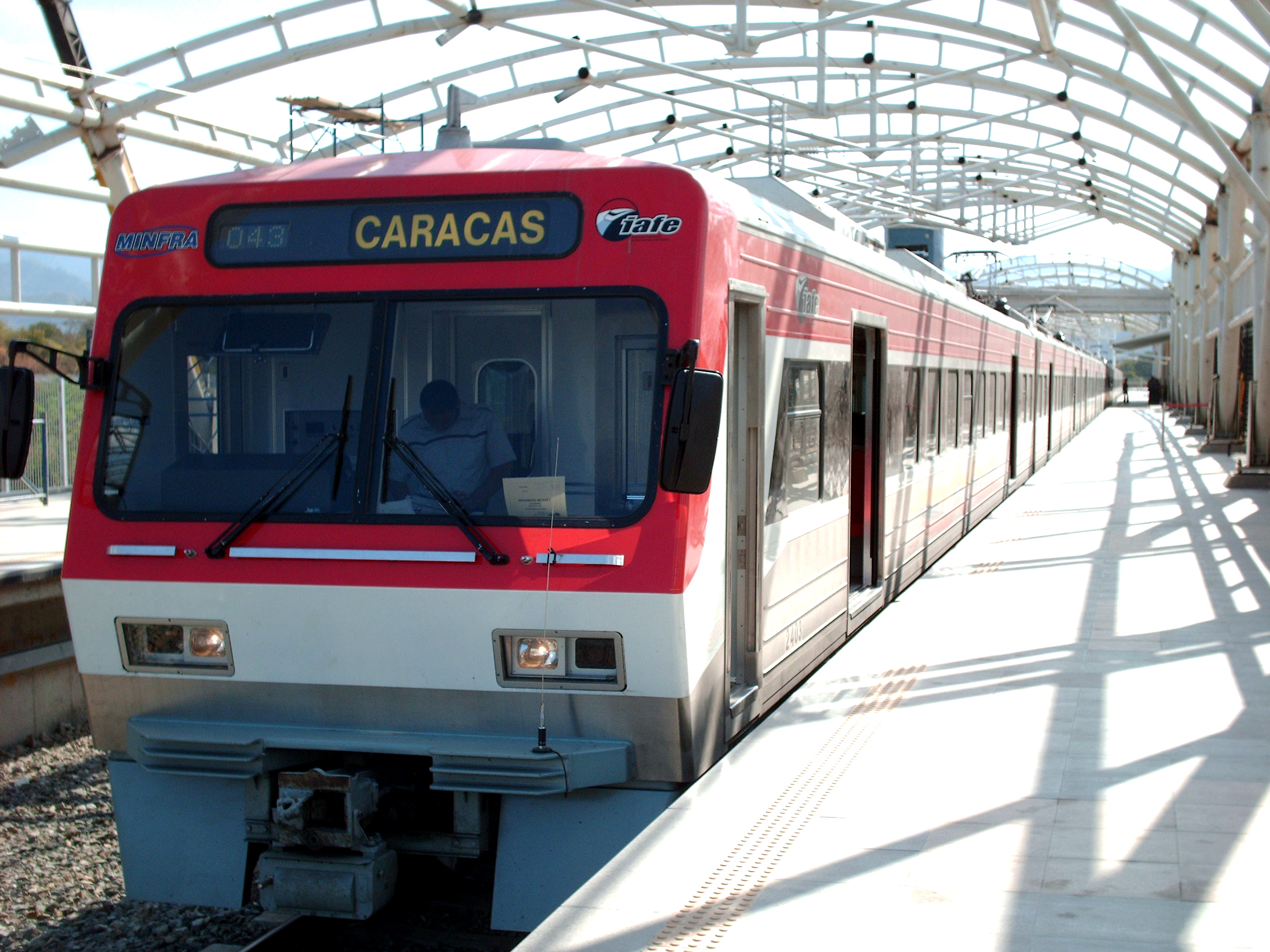
Railway Caracas – Cúa

The Caracas Metro has been in operation since 27 March 1983, with four lines, 47 stations and about 10 more to be constructed. It covers a great part of the city and also has an integrated ticket system that combines the route of the Metro with those offered by the Metrobús, a bus service of the Caracas Metro. In 2010, the first segment of a new aerial cable car system opened, Metrocable, which feeds into the larger metro system.

Buses are the main means of mass transportation. There are two bus systems: the traditional system and the Metrobús. Other transportation services include the IFE train to and from the Tuy Valley cities of Charallave and Cúa; the Simón Bolívar International Airport, the biggest and most important in the country; the metro additional services Caracas Aerial Tramway and Los Teques Metro (connecting Caracas with the suburban city of Los Teques); and the Generalissimo Francisco de Miranda Air Base used by military aviation and government airplanes.

=== Roads and highways ===
The largest concentration of road networks in Venezuela is in the Caracas region and its surroundings, with a large network of highways and avenues in the Metropolitan District, as well as other urban, suburban and interurban roads. The city's road network has become a major crossroads between the western, eastern, and central regions of the country, causing traffic congestion problems as the city is already saturated with vehicles from both within the city and from its immediate area of influence in La Guaira and Miranda, as well as from more distant parts of Venezuela.

Currently, a link is being built that will connect the Central Regional highway (at km 31) with the Gran Mariscal de Ayacucho highway (Kempis sector), in order to serve as a spillway to the city of Caracas and neighboring Guarenas and Guatire, so that vehicles that go from east to west or center, and vice versa, do not have to enter Caracas. The route of this highway would extend from the vicinity of the Charallave airport, passing through Santa Lucía and going up to the Kempis area (between Guatire and Caucagua).

Traffic in Caracas is heavily congested due to the high population density and large number of vehicles, causing traffic jams at any time in the day. Peak rush hour traffic is particularly bad, where vehicles can take up to 3 hours to get out of the congestion.

Since 1986, a mysterious black substance referred to as La Mancha Negra (The Black Stain) has oozed from roads has caused many car accidents killing multiple people.

=== Caracas Metro ===
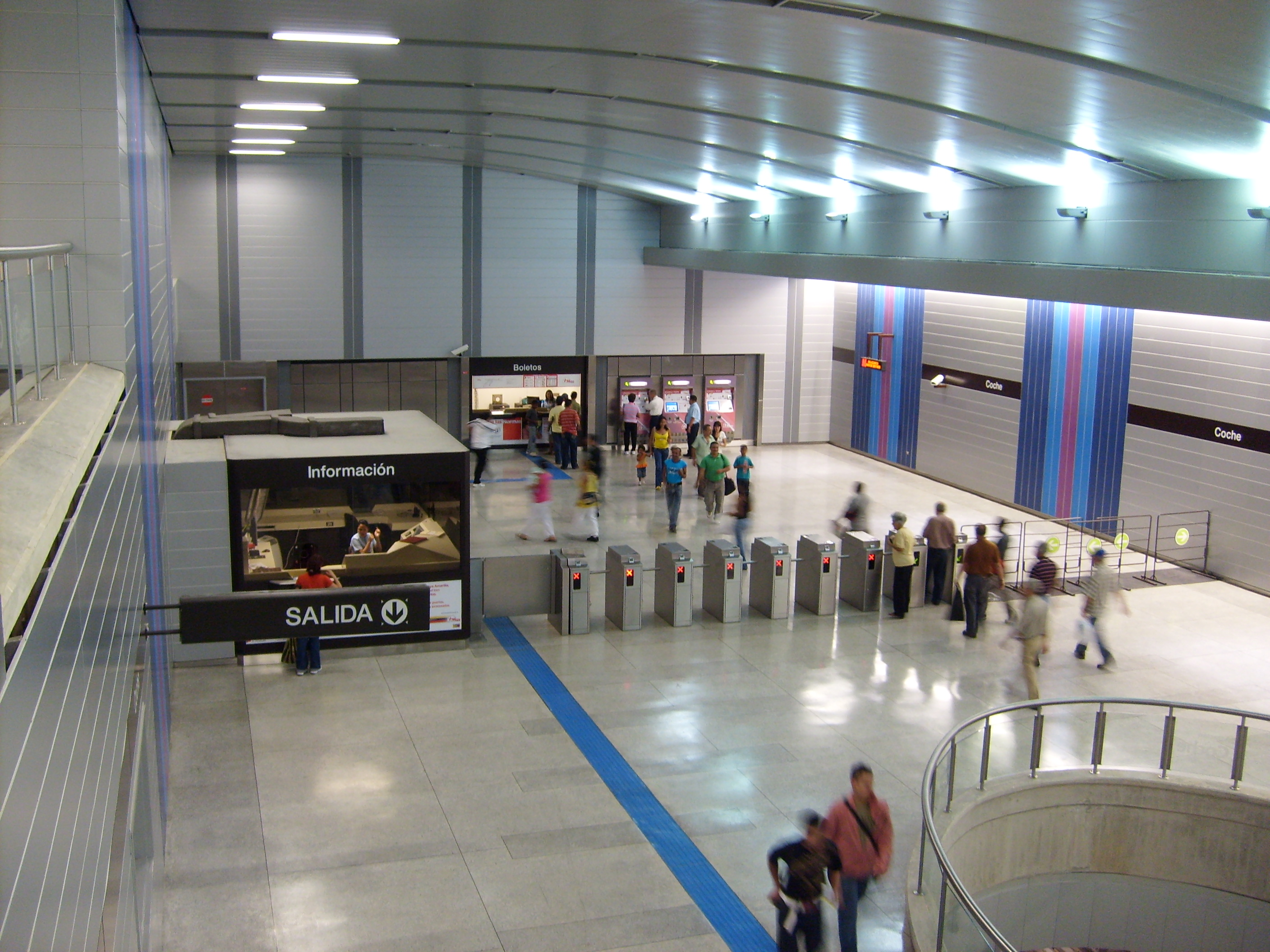
Coche Station, Caracas Metro

The Caracas Metro is one of the city's main forms of public transportation, with 47 operating stations transporting about 2 million passengers, according to official figures. The Caracas Metro system runs across the central part of the city from east to west, with additional lines that connect the southwest with other surface transportation systems of the Metro system (BusCaracas, MetroCable San Agustín). To the southeast, the network is connected to Cabletrén de Petare and Metrocable Mariche. Most stations also have Metrobús feeder routes.

The system is expanding, with projects like the extension of Line 3 to the La Rinconada station, creation of other intermediate stations along that route, and an interconnection between Plaza Venezuela and the Capuchinos station. There is also a planned connection to the Guarenas-Guatire Metro system, beginning with the Bello Monte station. An extension also reaches the city of Los Teques, the capital of Miranda. The three stations that comprise this last line make up the Los Teques Metro System. Both systems are operated by the company C. A. Metro de Caracas (Cametro).

The system inaugurated in 1983 is 71 km long and has five lines, being one of the longest in Latin America. Expansion plans also include an extension to the Baruta and El Hatillo municipalities, as well as to other metrocable systems in the city center.

=== BusCaracas ===
BusCaracas is a mass transit system that connects some areas of the Libertador Municipality of Caracas. It began operations in October 2012, taking other transportation systems such as the Trolemérida and Transbarca as a model. The work was undertaken by the Government of Venezuela through the Ministry of Public Works and Housing (MOPVI), the company in charge of the construction was VIALPA, until its contract was cancelled and replaced by PILPERCA in 2010, which was inaugurated on 3 October 2012.

=== Metrocable ===
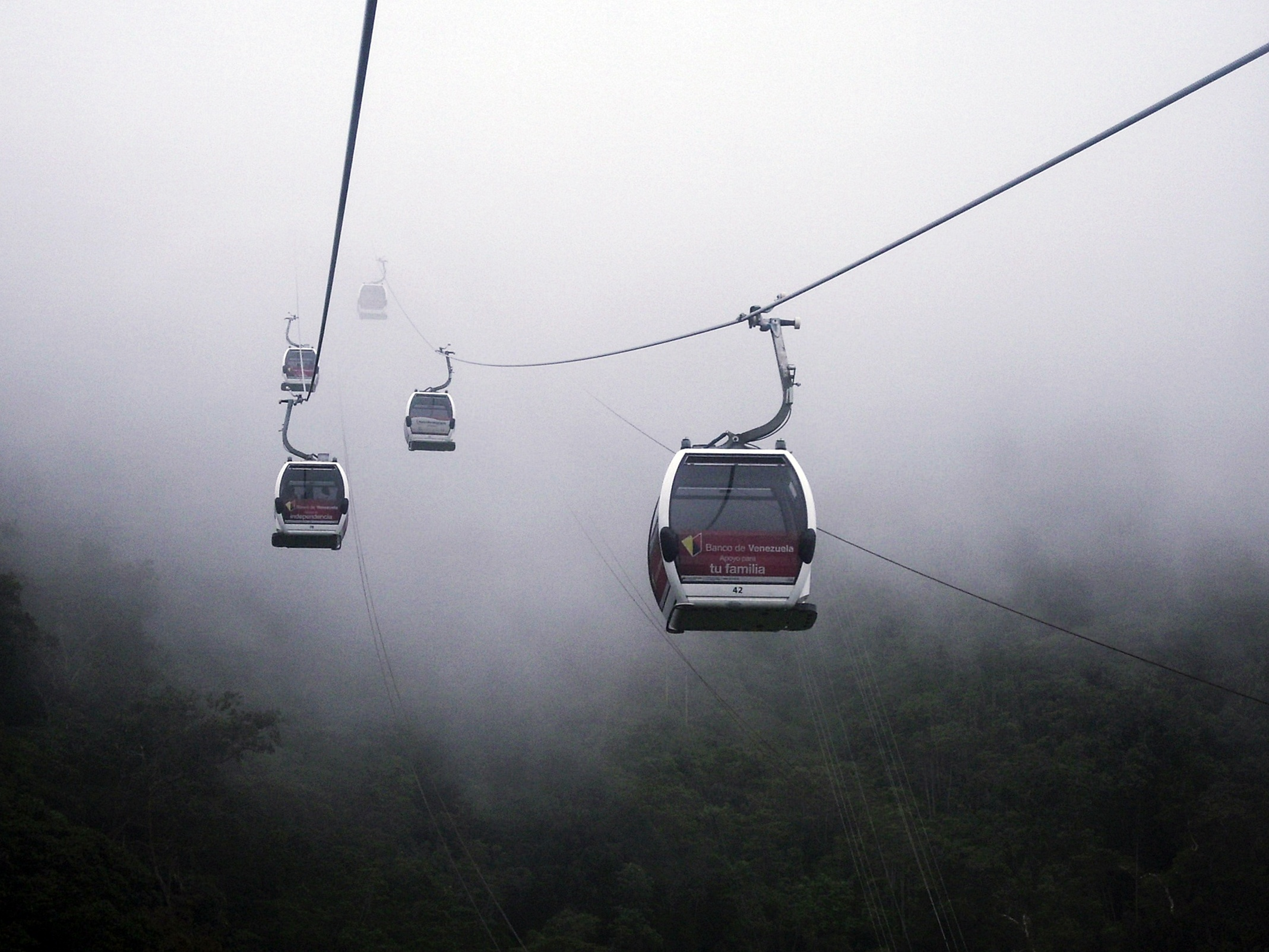
Caracas Metrocable

The Caracas Metrocable is a cable car system integrated into the Caracas Metro, conceived in such a way that residents of Caracas who are located in mountainous areas can travel in a faster and safer way to the city center. It functions as a feeder route in the style of the metrobus.

In 2011, a new metrocable system was built in the parish of San Agustín del Sur, where people can freely enjoy a view of a large part of Caracas.

=== Rail system ===
There is a national railway project, which aims to connect Caracas with the central area of the country. Currently, the Caracas-Cúa train service is operating, belonging to the Central Railway System of Venezuela "Ezequiel Zamora I". Inaugurated in 2006, it is the only railway section currently operating in Venezuela, according to the Instituto de Ferrocarriles del Estado (IFE). This commuter train line connects the city of Caracas with the towns of the Valles del Tuy (Charallave, Santa Lucía, Ocumare, Santa Teresa, Yare and Cúa) and runs for 41.4 kilometers.

The network begins its journey at the Libertador Simón Bolivar station in Caracas, located in La Rinconada and connected to line 3 of the Caracas metro. From the city it communicates with three other stations: Charallave Norte Francisco de Miranda and Charallave Sur Don Simón Rodríguez; both in the town of Charallave and ends at the Cúa General Ezequiel Zamora station (Cúa, Miranda).

== International relations ==
=== Twin towns – sister cities ===
Caracas is twinned with:

- A Coruña, Spain
- Adeje, Spain
- Honolulu, United States
- Madrid, Spain
- Melilla, Spain
- New Orleans, United States
- Panama City, Panama
- Quezon City, Philippines
- Rosario, Argentina
- Rio de Janeiro, Brazil
- Santa Cruz de Tenerife, Spain
- Santo Domingo, Dominican Republic
- Tehran, Iran
- Vigo, Spain

=== Union of Ibero-American Capital Cities ===
Caracas is part of the Union of Ibero-American Capital Cities from 12 October 1982.

== See also ==
- Greater Caracas
- Large Cities Climate Leadership Group
- Venezuela 60-day state of emergency
- List of cities in Venezuela
- List of metropolitan areas of Venezuela
