= List of companies of Venezuela =

Location of Venezuela

Venezuela is a federal republic located on the northern coast of South America. Oil was discovered in the early 20th century and, today, Venezuela has the world's largest known oil reserves and has been one of the world's leading exporters of oil. Previously an underdeveloped exporter of agricultural commodities such as coffee and cocoa, oil quickly came to dominate exports and government revenues. The 1980s oil glut led to an external debt crisis and a long-running economic crisis. Inflation peaked at 100% in 1996. As (by 1998) per capita GDP fell to the same level as 1963, down a third from its 1978 peak. The recovery of oil prices in the early 2000s gave Venezuela oil funds not seen since the 1980s. A destabilized economy led to a crisis in Bolivarian Venezuela, resulting in hyperinflation, an economic depression, shortages of basic goods and drastic increases in poverty, disease, child mortality, malnutrition, and crime.

== Notable firms ==
This list includes notable companies with primary headquarters located in the country. The industry and sector follow the Industry Classification Benchmark taxonomy. Organizations which have ceased operations are included and noted as defunct.

Notable companies Status: P=Private, S=State; A=Active, D=Defunct
Name	Industry	Sector	Headquarters	Founded	Notes	Status	
ACO, C.A.	Consumer services	Specialized consumer services	Caracas	1951	Car rentals	P	A
Aero Ejecutivos	Consumer services	Airlines	Maiquetía	2005	Airline	P	A
Aeroexpresos Ejecutivos, C.A.	Consumer services	Airlines	Caracas	1990	Passenger and cargo airline	P	A
Aeropostal Alas de Venezuela	Consumer services	Airlines	Caracas	1929	State airline, defunct 2017	P	D
Agencia Venezolana de Noticias	Consumer services	Broadcasting & entertainment	Caracas	1977	National news agency	S	A
Alcasa	Basic materials	Aluminum	Ciudad Guayana	1960	Aluminium	S	A
Alimentos La Giralda	Consumer goods	Food products	Caracas	1944	Food import, part of Fierro Group (Spain)	P	A
Alimentos Polar	Consumer goods	Food & beverage	Caracas	1954	Production and distribution, part of Empresas Polar	P	A
Asamblea Nacional Televisión	Consumer services	Broadcasting & entertainment	Caracas	2005	State broadcaster	S	A
Aserca Airlines	Consumer services	Airlines	Valencia	1968	Scheduled airline	P	A
Avensa	Consumer services	Airlines	Caracas	1943	Airline, defunct 2004	P	D
Avila TV	Consumer services	Broadcasting & entertainment	Caracas	2006	State television	S	A
Avior Airlines	Consumer services	Airlines	Barcelona	1994	Airline	P	A
Avior Regional	Consumer services	Airlines	Caracas	2015	Regional airline, part of Avior Airlines	P	A
Bancaribe	Financials	Banks	Caracas	1954	Bank	P	A
Banco Bicentenario	Financials	Banks	Caracas	2009	Bank	S	A
Banco de Venezuela	Financials	Banks	Caracas	1890	Bank	S	A
Banco Federal	Financials	Banks	Caracas	1982	Bank, defunct 2010	P	D
Banco Industrial de Venezuela	Financials	Banks	Caracas	1937	Bank, defunct 2009	P	D
Banco Nacional de Crédito (BNC)	Financials	Banks	Caracas	1977	Bank	P	A
Banco Occidental de Descuento (BOD)	Financials	Banks	Maracaibo	1957	Bank, defunct 2022	P	D
Banco Venezolano de Crédito	Financials	Banks	Caracas	1925	Bank	P	A
BANDES	Financials	Banks	Caracas	2001	Lending bank	P	A
Banesco	Financials	Banks	Caracas	1992	Bank	P	A
BBVA Provincial	Financials	Banks	Caracas	1953	Part of Banco Bilbao Vizcaya Argentaria (Spain)	P	A
Biblioteca Ayacucho	Consumer services	Publishing	Caracas	1974	Publisher	S	A
Bodegas Pomar, C.A.	Consumer goods	Distillers & vintners	Barquisimeto	1985	Wine	P	A
Bolívar Films	Consumer services	Broadcasting & entertainment	Caracas	1939	Film	P	A
Bolívar TV	Consumer services	Broadcasting & entertainment	Aroa	2004	Community broadcaster	P	A
Buena Televisión	Consumer services	Broadcasting & entertainment	Táchira	2006	State broadcaster	S	A
Calipso TV	Consumer services	Broadcasting & entertainment	Ciudad Guayana	2003	Television	P	A
Camunare Rojo TV	Consumer services	Broadcasting & entertainment	Yaracuy	2003	Television	P	A
Canal Maximo Televisión	Consumer services	Broadcasting & entertainment	Caracas	1993	Defunct 2006	P	D
CANTV	Telecommunications	Fixed line telecommunications	Caracas	1930	State telecom	S	A
Catia TVe	Consumer services	Broadcasting & entertainment	Caracas	2001	Local television	P	A
Cervecería Polar	Consumer goods	Brewer	Caracas	1941	Brewery, part of Empresas Polar	P	A
Chocolates El Rey	Consumer goods	Food products	Caracas	1929	Confectionery	P	A
Contacto Vecinal TV	Consumer services	Broadcasting & entertainment	José Félix Ribas	2005	Community television	P	A
Cinex	Consumer services	Recreational services	Caracas	1998	Theaters	P	A
Conviasa	Consumer services	Airlines	Maiquetía	2004	Airline	S	A
Coro TV	Consumer services	Broadcasting & entertainment	Coro	2004	Local television	P	A
Corpoelec	Utilities	Electricity	Caracas	2007	Power utility	S	A
Corporación Venezolana de Guayana (CVG)	Basic materials	Aluminum	Ciudad Guayana	1960	Mining and aluminum	S	A
Digitel GSM	Telecommunications	Mobile telecommunications	Caracas	1995	Mobile network	P	A
Ediciones Ekare	Consumer services	Publishing	Caracas	1978	Children's publisher	P	A
El Nacional	Consumer services	Publishing	Caracas	1943	Daily newspapers	P	A
El Universal	Consumer services	Publishing	Caracas	1909	Daily newspaper	P	A
Electricidad de Caracas (EDC)	Utilities	Electricity	Caracas	1895	Power utility, defunct 2007	P	D
Empresas 1BC	Consumer services	Broadcasting & entertainment	Caracas	1920	Broadcasting	P	A
Empresas Polar	Consumer goods	Food & beverage	Caracas	1941	Brewer, other food and beverage	P	A
Envases Venezolanos	Consumer goods	Glass & tinning	Caracas	1952	Packaging	P	A
Flamingo Televisión	Consumer services	Broadcasting & entertainment	Falcón	1990	Local television	P	A
FM Center	Consumer services	Broadcasting & entertainment	Caracas	1997	Radio	P	A
Fondo Común	Financials	Banks	Caracas	1963	Bank	P	A
Fundacomez	Consumer services	Broadcasting & entertainment	Zulia	2004	Local television	P	A
Galopando TV	Consumer services	Broadcasting & entertainment	Guárico	2004	Local television	P	A
Global TV (Venezuela)	Consumer services	Broadcasting & entertainment	Zulia	1990	Local television	P	A
Globovisión	Consumer services	Broadcasting & entertainment	Caracas	1994	Television news network	P	A
Helados EFE, C.A.	Consumer goods	Food products	Caracas	1926	Ice cream, part of Empresas Polar	P	A
IPOSTEL	Logistics	Delivery services	Caracas	1978	Postal services	S	A
Inter	Telecommunications	Fixed line telecommunications	Barquisimeto	1996	Cable	P	A
Jaureguina TV	Consumer services	Broadcasting & entertainment	La Grita	2004	Local television	P	A
LAI – Línea Aérea IAACA	Consumer services	Airlines	Barinas	1995	Airline, defunct 2006	P	D
LASER Airlines	Consumer services	Airlines	Caracas	1993	Airline	P	A
La Tele	Consumer services	Broadcasting & entertainment	Caracas	2002	Television network defunct, 2015	P	D
Línea Turística Aereotuy	Consumer services	Airlines	Caracas	1982	Airline	P	A
MANPA	Consumer goods	Pulp and paper	Caracas	1950	Tissue paper	P	A
Mercantil Servicios Financieros	Financials	Financial services	Caracas	1997	Banking, insurance, wealth management	P	A
Meridiano Televisión	Consumer services	Broadcasting & entertainment	Caracas	1996	Sports television, part of Bloque De Armas	P	A
Michelena TV	Consumer services	Broadcasting & entertainment	Michelena	2002	Local television	P	A
Montaña TV	Consumer services	Broadcasting & entertainment	Táchira	2004	Local television	P	A
Monte Ávila Editores	Consumer services	Publishing	Caracas	1968	Publisher	P	A
PDVSA	Oil & gas	Exploration & production	Caracas	1976	State oil & gas	S	A
PDVAL	Consumer goods	Food & beverage	Caracas	2008	Food supply network, part of PDVSA	S	A
Promar TV	Consumer services	Broadcasting & entertainment	Barquisimeto	1995	Regional television	P	A
Puma TV	Consumer services	Broadcasting & entertainment	Caracas	1995	Television, defunct 2007	P	D
Quijote TV	Consumer services	Broadcasting & entertainment	Zulia	2006	Local television	P	A
RCTV	Consumer services	Broadcasting & entertainment	Caracas	1953	Radio Caracas Televisión Internaciona, part of Empresas 1BC	P	A
RUTACA Airlines	Consumer services	Airlines	Ciudad Bolívar	1974	Airline	P	A
Sambil	Consumer services	Real estate development	Caracas	1958	Retail	P	A
SBA Airlines	Consumer services	Airlines	Caracas	1995	Airline	P	A
Servivensa	Consumer services	Airlines	Caracas	1990	Airline, part of Avensa	P	A
Sidetur	Basic materials	Iron & steel	Caracas	1948	Steel, part of Sivensa	P	A
SIDOR	Basic materials	Iron & steel	Caracas	1953	Steel	S	A
Síragon	Consumer goods	Consumer electronics	Valencia	2004	Appliances, computers, cell phones, TVs, white goods	P	A
Sivensa	Basic materials	Iron & steel	Caracas	1948	Steel	P	A
Sol América	Consumer services	Airlines	Caracas	1980	Domestic chartered airline	P	A
Sonográfica	Consumer services	Broadcasting & entertainment	Caracas	?	Record label	P	A
Supermercado De Candido	Consumer services	Retail	Falcón	1950	Supermarket chain	P	A
Survisión	Consumer services	Broadcasting & entertainment	Arzobispo Chacón	2004	Local television	P	A
Tarmas TV	Consumer services	Broadcasting & entertainment	Vargas	2002	Local television	P	A
TELE N	Consumer services	Broadcasting & entertainment	Maracaibo	?	Regional news, defunct	P	D
Telesur	Consumer services	Broadcasting & entertainment	Caracas	2005	State broadcaster	S	A
Teletambores TV	Consumer services	Broadcasting & entertainment	Santa Rita	2002	Local television	P	A
Televen	Consumer services	Broadcasting & entertainment	Caracas	1988	Television network	P	A
Televisora Comunitaria de Rubio	Consumer services	Broadcasting & entertainment	Rubio	2006	Local television	P	A
Televisora de Oriente	Consumer services	Broadcasting & entertainment	Puerto la Cruz	1992	Local television	P	A
Televisora Regional del Táchira (TRT)	Consumer services	Broadcasting & entertainment	San Cristóbal	1989	Local television	P	A
TV Bailadores	Consumer services	Broadcasting & entertainment	Bailadores	2004	Local television	P	A
TV Familia	Consumer services	Broadcasting & entertainment	Caracas	2000	Local television	P	A
TV Llano	Consumer services	Broadcasting & entertainment	San Juan de los Morros	1995	Local television	P	A
TV Puerto	Consumer services	Broadcasting & entertainment	Puerto la Cruz	2003	Local television	P	A
TVS (Venezuela)	Consumer services	Broadcasting & entertainment	Maracay	1994	Local television	P	A
ULA TV	Consumer services	Broadcasting & entertainment	Mérida	1999	Regional television	P	A
Valdez TV	Consumer services	Broadcasting & entertainment	Güiria	2005	Local television	P	A
Vale TV	Consumer services	Broadcasting & entertainment	Caracas	1998	Local television	P	A
Venevisión	Consumer services	Broadcasting & entertainment	Caracas	1961	Television network, part of Grupo Cisneros (US)	P	A
Venezolana de Televisión	Consumer services	Broadcasting & entertainment	Caracas	1964	State television network	S	A
Venezolana	Consumer services	Airlines	Maracaibo	2001	Low-cost airline	P	A
Vensecar Internacional	Consumer services	Airlines	Caracas	1996	Cargo airline	P	A
Vida TV	Consumer services	Broadcasting & entertainment	Táchira	2003	Local television	P	A
VIT, C.A.	Technology	Computer hardware	Falcón	2005	Laptops	P	A
ViVe Televisión	Consumer services	Broadcasting & entertainment	Caracas	2003	State television	S	A
Women's Development Bank	Financials	Banks	Caracas	2001	Bank	P	A
Zuliana de Aviación	Consumer services	Airlines	Maracaibo	1985	Airline, defunct 2002	P	D
Zuliana de Televisión	Consumer services	Broadcasting & entertainment	Zulia	1998	Regional television	P	A

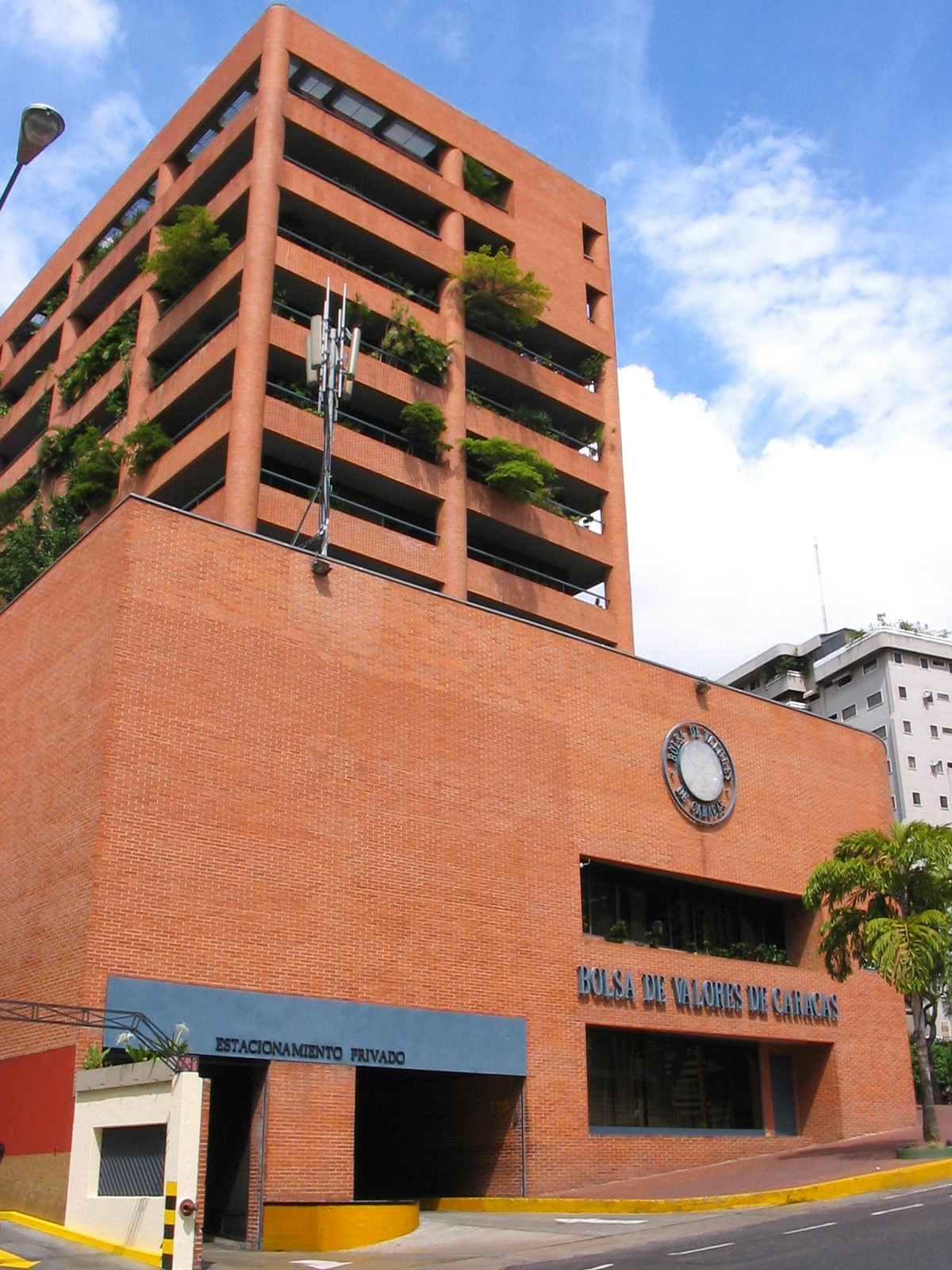
The Caracas Stock Exchange in the El Rosal district.

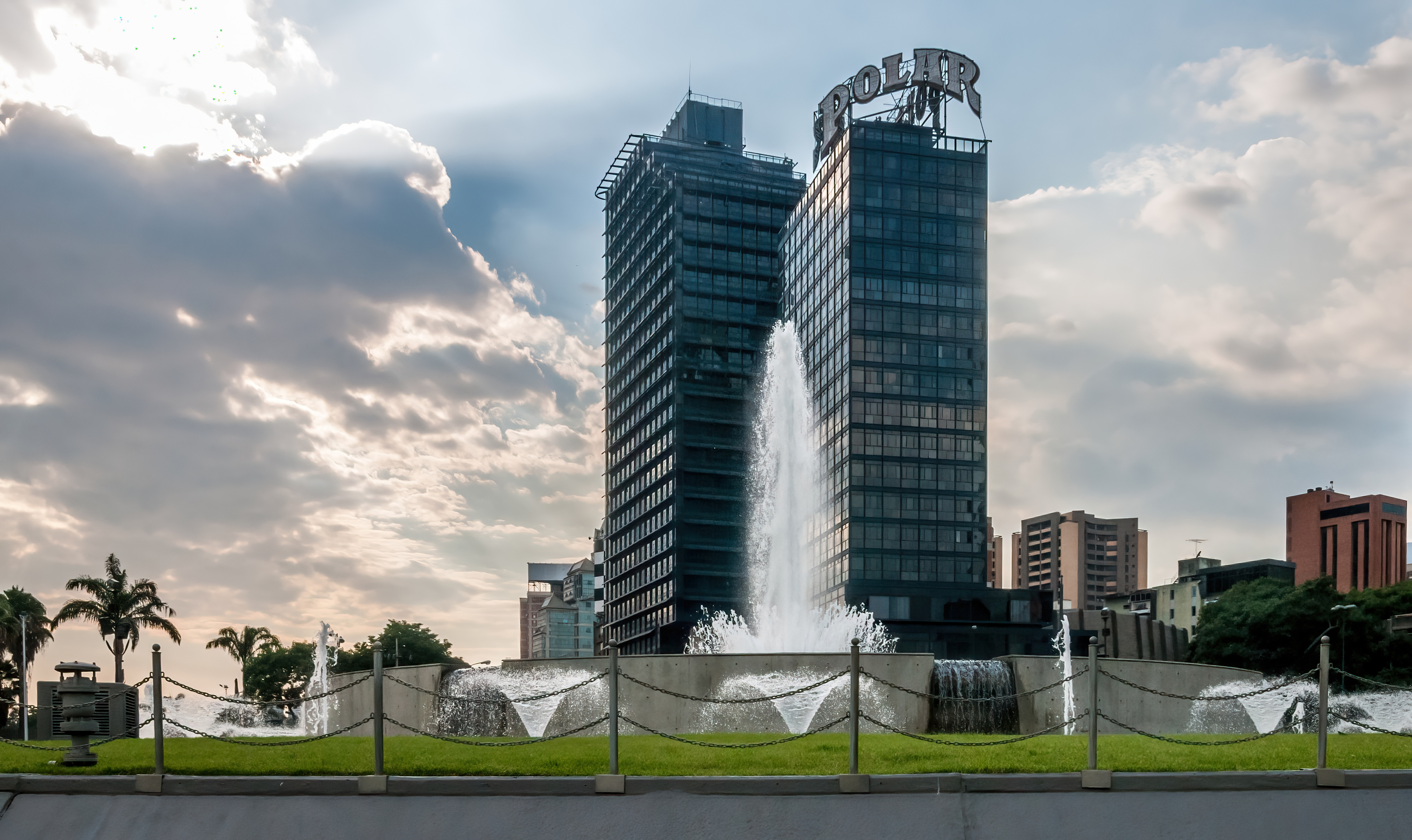
Plaza Venezuela in Caracas.

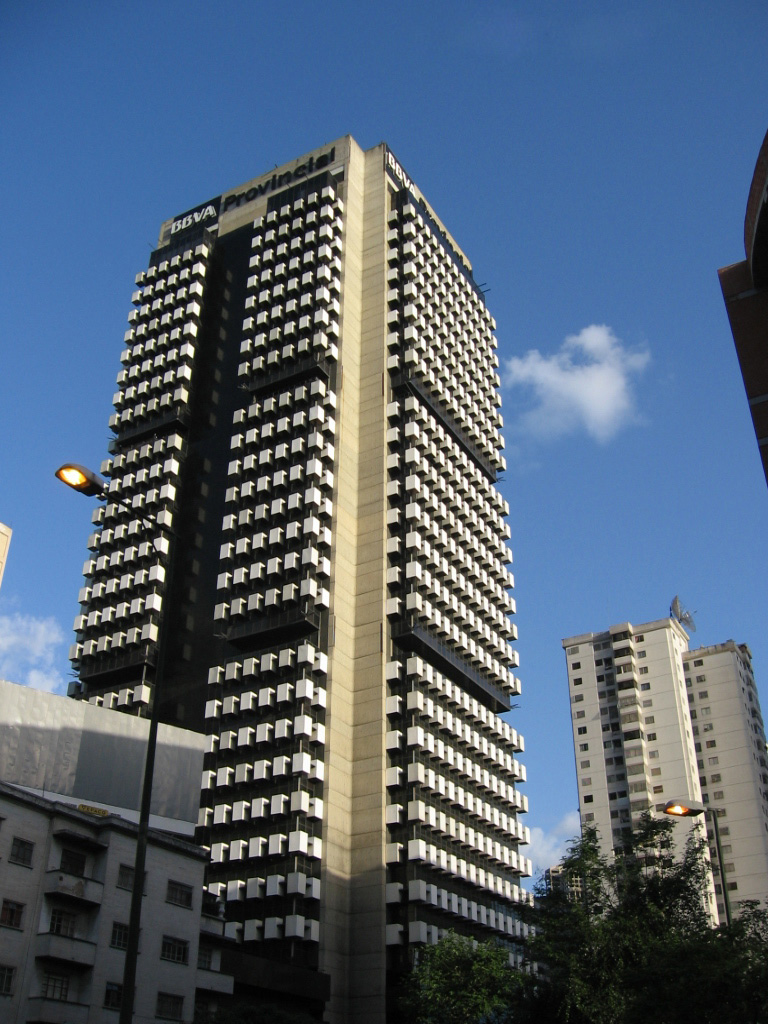
BBVA Provincial headquarters in Caracas.

== See also ==
- List of Venezuelan television channels
- List of Venezuelan cooperatives
