= List of television networks in Venezuela =

Television networks in Venezuela can be divided into three categories:

- National broadcasting networks, such as Venevision
- Regional broadcasting networks, such as Televisora Regional del Táchira o Contactv Televisora Regional de San Fernando, Estado Apure, Venezuela
- Community broadcasting networks, such as Catia TVe

== Table of broadcast networks ==
All of the networks listed below operate a number of terrestrial television stations. In addition, several of these networks are also aired on cable and satellite services.

Table of broadcast television networks
Major national networks
Television Network	Founded	% of Venezuelan households reached	# of households viewable	Type of network	# of Full-Power Affiliates	# of Low-Power/Class-A Affiliates & Transmitters
Venevisión	1961	TVes	TVes	Commercial	33	N/A
VTV	1964	N/A	N/A	Political, National	45	N/A
TVes	2007	N/A	N/A	Cultural, commercial, social service TV	N/A	N/A
Televen	1988	N/A	N/A	Commercial	27	N/A
ViVe	2003	N/A	N/A	Educational	N/A	N/A
Globovisión	1994	N/A	N/A	News, Commercial	7	N/A
Vale TV	1998	N/A	N/A	educational	27	N/A
Meridiano Televisión	1996	N/A	N/A	Commercial, sports	16	N/A
TeleSUR	2005	N/A	N/A	Political, News	4	N/A
Regional networks
Canal i (previously PumaTV)	1995	N/A	N/A	Commercial/news, regional	N/A	N/A
Vepaco TV	2002	N/A	N/A	Commercial, regional	14	N/A
Amavisión	1983	N/A	N/A	Commercial, regional	N/A	N/A
Televisora de Oriente	1992	N/A	N/A	Commercial, regional	8	N/A
TVS	1994	N/A	N/A	Commercial, regional	N/A	N/A
TRV (Orbivisión)	N/A	N/A	N/A	Commercial, regional	N/A	N/A
TIC TV	N/A	N/A	N/A	Commercial, regional	N/A	N/A
Color TV	N/A	N/A	N/A	Commercial, regional	N/A	N/A
Novavisión	N/A	N/A	N/A	Commercial, regional	N/A	N/A
Aragua TV	N/A	N/A	N/A	Commercial, regional	N/A	N/A
Telellano	N/A	N/A	N/A	Commercial, regional	N/A	N/A
Rumbera TV	N/A	N/A	N/A	Commercial, regional	N/A	N/A
Llanovisión	N/A	N/A	N/A	Commercial, regional	N/A	N/A
Bolívar Visión	N/A	N/A	N/A	Commercial, regional	N/A	N/A
TV Guayana	1993	N/A	N/A	Commercial, regional	N/A	N/A
NTV Televisión	N/A	N/A	N/A	Commercial, regional	N/A	N/A
DAT TV	2001	N/A	N/A	Commercial, regional	N/A	N/A
Niños Cantores Televisión	1987	N/A	N/A	Commercial, regional	N/A	N/A
Avila TV	2006	N/A	N/A	Commercial, regional	N/A	N/A
LaSimón TV	N/A	N/A	N/A	Commercial, regional	N/A	N/A
UCV TV (Caracas)|UCV TV	N/A	N/A	N/A	Commercial, regional	N/A	N/A
Flamingo Televisión	N/A	N/A	N/A	Commercial, regional	N/A	N/A
Sol TV	N/A	N/A	N/A	Commercial, regional	N/A	N/A
TV Llano	1995	N/A	N/A	Commercial, regional	N/A	N/A
Promar TV	1995	N/A	N/A	Commercial, regional	N/A	N/A
Somos TV	2005	N/A	N/A	Commercial, regional	N/A	N/A
V+TV	N/A	N/A	N/A	Commercial, regional	N/A	N/A
Telecentro	1990	N/A	N/A	Commercial, regional	6	N/A
Televisora Andina de Mérida	1982	N/A	N/A	Commercial, regional	N/A	N/A
OMC Televisión	1998	N/A	N/A	Commercial, regional	N/A	N/A
ULA TV	1999	N/A	N/A	Commercial, regional	N/A	N/A
AR Visión	N/A	N/A	N/A	Commercial, regional	N/A	N/A
Telemir	2005	N/A	N/A	Commercial, regional	N/A	N/A
Sol Televisión	N/A	N/A	N/A	Commercial, regional	N/A	N/A
Tele Éxito	N/A	N/A	N/A	Commercial, regional	11	N/A
Telecaribe (Venezuela)|Telecaribe	1989	N/A	N/A	Commercial, regional	20	N/A
Portuguesa TV	N/A	N/A	N/A	Commercial, regional	N/A	N/A
Universal Televisión	N/A	N/A	N/A	Commercial, regional	N/A	N/A
Regional Acarigua	N/A	N/A	N/A	Commercial, regional	N/A	N/A
Televisra Regional de Portuguesa	N/A	N/A	N/A	Commercial, regional	N/A	N/A
Prisma Televisión	N/A	N/A	N/A	Commercial, regional	N/A	N/A
Telesol	N/A	N/A	N/A	Commercial, regional	N/A	N/A
Olímpica Televisión	N/A	N/A	N/A	Commercial, regional	N/A	N/A
Televisora Regional del Táchira	1989	N/A	N/A	Commercial, regional	N/A	N/A
Canal 21 (Táchira)	N/A	N/A	N/A	Commercial, regional	N/A	N/A
Buena TV	2006	N/A	N/A	Commercial, regional	N/A	N/A
Total TV (TTV)	N/A	N/A	N/A	Commercial, regional	N/A	N/A
TeleBoconó	1979	N/A	N/A	Commercial, regional	N/A	N/A
Tele Yaracuy	N/A	N/A	N/A	Commercial, regional	N/A	N/A
Yaracuyana TV	N/A	N/A	N/A	Commercial, regional	N/A	N/A
Televiza	1994	N/A	N/A	Commercial, regional	4	N/A
Zuliana de Televisión	1991	N/A	N/A	Commercial, regional	3	N/A
Global TV	1999	N/A	N/A	Commercial, regional	N/A	N/A
Telecolor	N/A	N/A	N/A	Commercial, regional	N/A	N/A
Tele N	N/A	N/A	N/A	Commercial, regional	N/A	N/A
URBE Televisión	N/A	N/A	N/A	Commercial, regional	N/A	N/A
Ciudad TV	N/A	N/A	N/A	Commercial, regional	N/A	N/A
TV Familia	2001	N/A	N/A	Religion, regional	N/A	N/A
Community television networks
TV Puerto	2003	N/A	N/A	Community	1	N/A
TV Apure	N/A	N/A	N/A	Community	1	N/A
Teletambores	2002	N/A	N/A	Community	1	N/A
Contacto Vecinal TV	2005	N/A	N/A	Community	1	N/A
Zamora TV	2004	N/A	N/A	Community	1	N/A
Oritvisión	2004	N/A	N/A	Community	1	N/A
Calipso TV	2003	N/A	N/A	Community	1	N/A
TV Río	N/A	N/A	N/A	Community	1	N/A
Catia TVe	2001	N/A	N/A	Community	1	N/A
TV Caricuao	2002	N/A	N/A	Community	1	N/A
Coro TV	2004	N/A	N/A	Community	1	N/A
Galopando TV	2004	N/A	N/A	Community	1	N/A
Lara TV	2004	N/A	N/A	Community	1	N/A
Azul TVC	N/A	N/A	N/A	Community	1	N/A
Survisión	2004	N/A	N/A	Community	1	N/A
TV Bailadores	2004	N/A	N/A	Community	1	N/A
TV Petare	2002	N/A	N/A	Community	1	N/A
Siguaraya TV	2006	N/A	N/A	Community	1	N/A
Valdez TV	2005	N/A	N/A	Community	1	N/A
Jaureguina TV	2004	N/A	N/A	Community	1	N/A
Michelena TV	2002	N/A	N/A	Community	1	N/A
Montaña TV	2004	N/A	N/A	Community	1	N/A
TV Rubio	2006	N/A	N/A	Community	1	N/A
Vida TV	2003	N/A	N/A	Community	1	N/A
Tarmas TV	2002	N/A	N/A	Community	1	N/A
Camunare Rojo TV	2003	N/A	N/A	Community	1	N/A
Bolívar TV	2004	N/A	N/A	Community	1	N/A
Fundacomez	2004	N/A	N/A	Community	1	N/A
Quijote TV	2006	N/A	N/A	Community	1	N/A
Arawakos TVC	2007	N/A	N/A	Community	1	N/A
Venezuela Heroica	2007	N/A	N/A	Community	1	N/A
TV Limón	2007	N/A	N/A	Community	1	N/A

== History ==
History of Broadcast networks
1953-1960	1961-1970	1970-1980	1980-1990	1990-2000	2000-2007
Televisora Nacional TVN-5 (22 Noviembre 1952)	Televisora Nacional	Televisora Nacional Red canal 5 (1974)	Televisora Nacional red canal 5	Televisora Nacional red canal 5 - ValeTV (1998)	ValeTV
Televisa canal 4 (1° Junio 1953 - 1960)	Venevisión Canal 4 (27 Febrero 1961)	Venevisión	Venevisión	Venevisión	Venevisión Canal 4 - Venevisión Continental (28 Agosto 2000)
Radio Caracas Televisión Canal 2, 7 y 10 (15 Noviembre 1953)	RCTV	RCTV	RCTV	Radio Caracas Televisión	Radio Caracas Televisión Canal 2 (27 Mayo 2007) - RCTV Internacional - por cable (16 de Julio 2007)
Televisa del Zulia (1956)	Canal 22 (Caracas)	Setiembro 25 1956	Cidade De Venezolana	Inspectòr Cities	
Ondas del Lago Televisión canal 13 Saò Barthelemy (1° Octubre 1957)	TeleZulia	(9° Noviembre 1957)	en (1° Enero 1959)		
Radio Valencia Television (1958)	Radio Valencia Televisión	Teletrece	Teletrece	Teletrece	
	Cadena Venezolana de Television canal 8 CVTV (1ª Agosto 1964)	Cadena Venezolana de Television canal 8 CVTV - Venezolana de Television red canal 8 (1974)	Venezolana de Television red canal 8	Venezolana de Television	Venezolana de Televisión

== Defunct over-the-air Venezuelan television networks ==
- Televisora Nacional - Government network, predecessor of Vale TV.
- Televisa - The first commercial network in Venezuela, was bought out by the Grupo Cisneros and became Venevisión.
- RCTV (Radio Caracas Televisión) - Second commercial network whose license expired on May 27, 2007. The license renewal was refused by the Government of Hugo Chávez. It was re-launched on cable and satellite television networks on July 16, 2007 as RCTV International.
- Televisa del Zulia - First regional commercial network, created in 1956 and closed in 1960.
- Ondas del Lago Televisión - Regional television network - Active in the late '50s.
- Radio Valencia Televisión - A regional over-the-air broadcast network from 1958 to 1962.
- Teletrece - A regional television network - Active in the 60's.
- Canal 11 Televisión - Commercial television network, 1966 – 1968.
- Canal 11 (Maracaibo) - A regional television network - Active in the 60's.
- Marte TV - A Caracas regional network. Sold and re-launched as La Tele on December 1, 2002.
- La Tele - Closed in 2015
- Puma TV - predecessor of Canal i.

== See also ==
- Television in Venezuela
- Lists of television channels
- List of newspapers in Venezuela
