= Televisora Andina de Mérida =

- Type: Terrestrial television network
- Country: Venezuela
- Owner: Radiodifusora Andina de Mérida, S.A.
- Launch date: 2 September 1982
- Official website: TAM TV

TAM Logo

Televisora Andina de Mérida (shortened to TAM TV) is a television broadcast network owned by Radiodifusora Andina de Mérida, S.A. and based in the city of Mérida in Venezuela. TAM TV was founded in 1982 becoming the first operational regional television network in Venezuela. In 2006 the network joins TRT, TVO, TVS, Promar TV and Global TV to form the TVR television alliance (Televisión Regional), which broadcasts five more channels on pay TV.

Its current slogan is Tan nuestra como siempre (Spanish for as ours as always).

== See also ==
- Media of Venezuela
