= Mérida Province =

Mérida Province may refer to:

- Mérida Province (1622–1676), a province of the New Kingdom of Granada
- Mérida Province (Venezuela) (1811–1864), a province of Gran Colombia
