= Wilmer Ruperti =

Venezuelan businessman

Wilmer Ruperti (born December 7, 1959) is a Venezuelan-born shipping business magnate. Since 2003, he has captured a major share of the market in physically exporting oil from Venezuela to the rest of Latin America, and has become one of Venezuela's wealthiest persons.

Lloyd's List International described Ruperti in 2004 as a man who transformed himself from a shipping master into a leading player in Venezuela's billion-dollar oil business, and that “everything Wilmer Ruperti touches appears to turn to gold”.

== Career ==
Ruperti's career began in 1987 as a tanker master for Venezuelan oil company, Maraven, S.A., an industry affiliate of Venezuela's state-owned oil company, Petróleos de Venezuela, S.A. (PDVSA). He later studied shipping in Plymouth, England, before returning to Caracas, Venezuela, to set up his own small shipbroking firm.

=== PDVSA strike ===
Ruperti's big break in the shipping business came in late 2002 when he shipped gasoline to Venezuelan ports, using tankers chartered from Russia, during the Venezuelan general strike of 2002–2003, which featured a strike by thousands of employees at PDVSA.

The strike by PDVSA staff severely reduced oil production and exports, and cut domestic fuel supplies before it failed. As a result of his successful shipping arrangements, Ruperti was able to consolidate his business relationship with PDVSA and the government. Although his business acumen earned him the disdain of the PDVSA employees who went on strike and were later dismissed, Chávez decorated Ruperti with the Star of Carabobo, a Venezuelan medallion usually awarded to military officers for distinguished service.

=== Shipping company ===
Ruperti's ship-owning company, Suramericana de Transportes de Petróleo, owns a fleet of oil tankers and other vessels, and his ship management business is called Global Ship Management. Ruperti has become deeply involved in Chávez's policy of shipping discounted oil to Argentina and numerous countries in the Caribbean. The Venezuelan business news portal Descifrado.com reported in June 2006 that Ruperti was setting up a maritime investment fund, and was planning to raise $500m for the construction of eight new oil tankers.

=== Recent business expansion ===
Ruperti has recently moved into other areas of business. He owns a private television channel in Venezuela called Canal i, formerly called Puma TV.

== Personal life ==
In December 2006, The Wall Street Journal profiled Ruperti, who is of Italian ancestry, and quoted him as saying that he supported Chávez because he is “the only person who has identified himself with the poor”. The article also described Ruperti's lifestyle, noting that he has two South Korean bodyguards, moves around Caracas in a bullet-proof BMW, owns a private jet, and in 2005 sponsored a charity concert held in Caracas by Luciano Pavarotti. Ruperti is a keen golfer and has set up a youth golf school in Caracas.

At an unreported date, Ruperti bought two gold-plated Napoleonic-era pistols which were once owned by Simón Bolívar, the Venezuelan-born Latin American 19th century independence leader, at an auction in New York, for $1.6m. It was later reported that he planned to donate the pistols to the Venezuelan government, but Ruperti denied this in his Wall Street Journal interview, saying he would leave them to his children. However, Venezuelan President, Hugo Chávez Frías confirmed that he received the pistols in national TV in July 2011. In said video, President Chávez states clearly that Ruperti "donated" the pistols.
