= Michelena TV =

- Type: Broadcast television network
- Country: Venezuela
- Availability: Michelena, Michelena Municipality, Tachira State (UHF channel 39)
- Owner: Michelena TV (a community foundation)
- Key people: Luis Enrique Jaimes, legal representative
- Launch date: December 2002

Michelena TV is a Venezuelan community television channel. It was created in December 2002 and can be seen in the community of Michelena in the Michelena Municipality of the Tachira State of Venezuela on UHF channel 39. Luis Enrique Jaimes is the legal representative of the foundation that owns this channel.

Michelena TV does not have a website.

== See also ==
- List of Venezuelan television channels
