= Canal 11 =

Canal 11 (Spanish and Portuguese for Channel 11) can refer to:

- Canal 11 (Argentina), an Argentinian television channel
- Canal 11 (Honduras), a Honduran television channel
- Canal 11 (Portugal), a Portuguese television channel
- Canal 11 Televisión, a former Venezuelan television channel
- Canal Once (Mexico), a Mexican television channel
- Repretel 11, a Costa Rican television channel
