= List of radio stations in Venezuela =

This list of radio stations in Venezuela can be sorted by their name, modulation, frequencies, city, or website.

Name	Band	Frequency	City	Website
La 96.7 FM	FM	96.7	Puerto Cabello	Website
Ecos del Torbes	AM	780	San Cristobal	Website
88.1 FM (Venezuela)	FM	88.1	Caracas	Website
Somos 93.5 FM La Romantica	FM	93.5	Barquisimeto	Website
A.L Stereo 89.7 FM	FM	89.7	Colon, Zulia	Website
Angel FM 93.7	FM	93.7	Valera, Trujillo	Website
B-96 FM	FM	95.9	Barquisimeto	Website
FM Center	FM	106.5	Caracas + National Cov.	Website
CNB Merideña	FM	95.3	Mérida	Website
Ciudad 88.5 FM	FM	88.5	Maracay	Website
El Vacilón 106.3 FM	FM	106.3	Charallave	Website
Exitos 94.9 FM	FM	99.9	Caracas + National Cov.	Website
Hot 94 FM	FM	94.1	Caracas	Website
KYS FM	FM	101.5	Caracas	Website
Lasser FM 97.7	FM	97.7	Puerto La Cruz	Website
La Mega 107.3 FM	FM	107.3	Caracas + National Cov.	Website
Metropolis 103.9 FM	FM	103.9	Maracaibo	Website
Planeta FM 105.3	FM	105.3	Caracas	Website
Radio Aragua	AM	1010	Cagua, Aragua	Website
Radio Caracas Radio (RCR)	AM	750	Caracas	Website
Radio Carora	AM	640	Carora, Lara	Website
Radio Nacional de Venezuela	AM & FM	Various	National Coverage	Website
Radio Rumbos	AM	670	Chacao, Miranda	Website
Sabor 106.5 FM	FM	106.5	Maracaibo	Website
Sigma 105.1 FM	FM	105.1	Charallave	Website
Turismo 97.5 FM	FM	97.5	Mérida	Website

== See also ==
- List of Venezuelan television channels
