= Canal 11 (Venezuela) =

Venezuelan regional TV channel

- Type: Broadcast Television Network
- Country: Venezuela
- Broadcast area: Venezuela (states of Zulia, Carabobo, and Lara)

Programming
- Picture format: 480i SDTV

Ownership
- Owner: Archdiocese of Maracaibo (Niños Cantores Televisión (NCTV), C.A.)
- Key people: Victor Carrillo, Director General

History
- Launched: January 31, 1987
- Founder: Gustavo Ocando Yamarte

Availability

Terrestrial
- Analog VHF: Channel 11 (Zulia, listings may vary)

Niños Cantores Televisión, or NCTV, is a Venezuelan regional television channel that is seen in the Zulia State, Carabobo State, and Lara State on VHF channel 11.

== History ==
The Instituto Arquidiocesano Niños Cantores Del Zulia, a school that mainly offers music and religion lessons to children in the Zulia state, was created in the year 1974. Later, Gustavo Ocando Yamarte, creator of this institute, also would create the university "Cecilio Acosta" (UNICA). At around the same time, the regional television channel known as "Niños Cantores Televisión, C.A", was created. This happened on January 31, 1987, after a long dispute with the government over the channel's concessions and installations. NCTV was the third television station to be created in the Zulia state after Televisoras del Zulia and Ondas del Lago Televisión.

In its beginning, the members of the board of director of NCTV were Father Ocando Yamarte (president) and Dr. Elio Tulio Álvarez (general manager). This board remained in control until 1992, when professor Xiomara Villasmil was appointed the manager. She remained in her position until 1996. A couple of years later, NCTV changed their image and logo and converted into the corporation "Niños Cantores Televisión, C.A". They also expanded their coverage to the Carabobo and Lara states.

In 1996, E. Pérez Lorito was named the station's general manager, staying in his position until October 3, 1997, when the Archdiocese of Maracaibo, as the channels main investor, decided to conduct an audit on the channels administration. Afterwards, the corporation was headed by the economist Alfredo Zambrano, who was appointed the chairman of the corporation.

It was found during the audit that there was serious administrative disorder, which resulted in the reformation of NCTV, C.A, beginning in 1994 and continuing to this day.

Later, in January 1998, the Archbishop of Maracaibo, Ramón Ovidio Pérez Morales, assumed the presidency of the corporation. He realized a press conference to publicly relieve their creditors any obligations of the corporation. National and regional television stations were present at this press conference.

Paying off its debts was the beginning of the process of the administrative restructuring, not only for NCTV but for all of the companies that are owned by the corporation. A board of directors was installed. It included Ramón Ovidio Pérez (president), the economist Alfredo Zambrano (presidente of accounts), San J. Zambrano (manager of the corporation) and Isabel Pineda (manager of administration and finances), and Cecil Suárez (administrative director).

Elvis Monzant, a judicial consultor, later named Willians Delgado Silva as executive president the television station in March 1998.

At the end of the administrative audit, the archdiocese of Maracaibo decided to create the position of Vicepresident of the corporation and hired a corporated team that was in charge of managing all of the companies owned by the Archdiocese of Maracaibo (La Emisora Radial, La Voz de la Fe, NC Stereo, C.A, Editora La Columna, and of course, NCTV).

In July 1999, a second audit occurred. As a result the board of directors was removed and new executives were named to manage the station.

Victor Carrillo is the station's current Director General.

== See also ==
- List of Venezuelan television channels
- Catholic television
- Catholic television channels
- Catholic television networks
