= FM Center =

Venezuelan radio network

Circuito FM Center
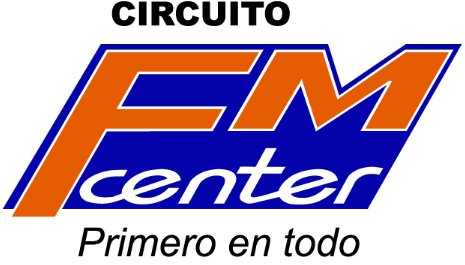
- Type: Private
- Industry: Radio
- Founded: 1997
- Founder: Rodolfo Rodríguez García
- Headquarters: Caracas, Venezuela
- Area served: Venezuela
- Key people: Martha Rodríguez Miranda, General Director
- Divisions: AM Center, Circuito La Romántica and Circuito Fiesta
- Website: www.fmcenter.com.ve

FM Center is a radio network in Venezuela based on Caracas. It was founded by Rodolfo Rodríguez García and is the largest radio network of that country, owning 64 AM and FM radio stations nationwide and one internet-based. It is divided into three sub-networks: AM Center, Circuito La Romántica and Circuito Fiesta.

FM Center also delivers other radio services as news (FM Center es Noticia) and the popular traffic report with Alejandro Cañizales aboard a red Bell Ranger helicopter, Traffic Center.

== History ==
In January 1997, with Martha Rodríguez Miranda as General Director and Enzo Cassella as vicepresident of programming and production, FM Center starts broadcasting their signal in Venezuela. For that time, the network owned only 5 radio stations: 88.9 (later to become "La Romántica"), HOT 94.1, Estrella 96.3, Fiesta 106.5 and 93.9 (Ciudad Bolívar). Only the latter was not located in the capital Caracas.

Already in 1998, FM Center swept with Venezuelan awards Premios Mara de Oro for their performance in the industry. This favored the expansion of the network towards the rest of the country. At the start of the 21st century, AM Center was created and the radio station 91.9 from Caracas was added in their stations portfolio as Life 91.9.

In 2000, the headquarters and major radio stations move to Centro Comercial Concresa in the southeast of the Venezuelan capital. The concept of the transformation was the construction of interactive studios where the audience could not only hear their programs, but also see them as they were recorded. In September, FM Center launches the first and only traffic service to drivers in the Capital District: Traffic Center. With Alejandro Cañizales aboard a red Bell Ranger helicopter, Traffic Center delivers instant and effective status of local transit. The show also informs drivers with alternative routes to avoid traffic and preventive campaigns about the many problems that affect Caracas transit system.

In 2007, FM Center launched an oversize trailer which wonders the roads of Venezuela called Showcenter Rodando. It was designed to produce live in site-transmissions and live concerts from its stage located in the rooftop of the vehicle.

In January 2008, Estrella 96.3, an emblematic and key station to the network ceased transmissions as the new state-owned ALBA Ciudad started broadcasting. The frequency was lost to FM Center when the Venezuelan government refused to renew the concession to the network. As a response, the first internet-based radio station was incorporated to the group under the name Estrella On-Line as a clear reference to Estrella 96.3, maintaining similar formats and shows. Nowadays, FM Center's radio stations are interconnected via Directv satellite.

== Business ==
=== Networks ===
FM Center is divided into three sub-networks: AM Center, Circuito La Romántica and Circuito Fiesta. They are broadcast nationwide in Venezuela. Only 3 radio stations are not categorized in the sub-networks in order to keep their segment-oriented quality. Usually there is one radio station of every sub-network per state where the company is present. This division of networks allows for convenient sell of air time to clients according to audience targets. The radio networks are explained in further detail in the following table:

Name	Description	Stations	States
AM Center	AM radio stations with content directed to most Venezuelans and popular and traditional music	20	12 + Capital District
Circuito La Romántica	FM radio stations with content to adults and English and Spanish music from the last decades and contemporary	21	15 + Capital District
Circuito Fiesta	FM radio stations with content to any audience and salsa music, merengue and other Latin rhythms	20	15 + Capital District

==== Radio Stations ====
FM Center owns or at least is an important partner in 64 radio stations in Venezuela and one internet-based. They are distributed in 21 of the 23 Venezuelan states and in the capital district of Caracas. Some radio stations located in Táchira state can be heard across the border from Colombia.

Radio stations of FM Center.
State	City	Name	Network	Modulation	Frequency
Internet		Estrella On Line (Tropical Latino)			
Anzoátegui	El Tigre	Fiesta	Circuito Fiesta	FM	106.3
Anzoátegui	El Tigre	La Romántica	Circuito La Romántica	FM	88.9
Anzoátegui	Barcelona/Pto. La Cruz	La Romántica	Circuito La Romántica	FM	98.9
Anzoátegui	Puerto Píritu	Playera	Circuito Fiesta	FM	101.9
Anzoátegui	Anaco/Cantaura	Yes	Circuito Fiesta	FM	103.5
Apure	San Fernando de Apure	Prestigio	Circuito Fiesta	FM	104.5
Apure	San Fernando de Apure	Radio Superior	AM Center	AM	1070
Aragua	-	La Romántica	Circuito La Romántica	FM	94.3
Barinas	Barinas	Marquesa	Circuito La Romántica	FM	107.1
Barinas	Barinas	Primerísima	Circuito Fiesta	FM	98.3
Barinas	Barinas	Radio Llanera	AM Center	AM	680
Barinas	Santa Bárbara de Barinas	Radio Alto Llano	AM Center	AM	600
Barinas	Santa Bárbara de Barinas	Sidereal	Circuito Fiesta	FM	98.9
Bolívar	Ciudad Bolívar	Electrik	Circuito Fiesta	FM	97.7
Bolívar	Ciudad Bolívar	La Romántica	Circuito La Romántica	FM	93.9
Bolívar	Ciudad Bolívar/Upata	Radio Guayana	AM Center	AM	820
Bolívar	Puerto Ordaz	Fiesta	Circuito Fiesta	FM	94.9
Bolívar	Puerto Ordaz	La Romántica	Circuito La Romántica	FM	102.3
Carabobo	-	La Romántica	Circuito La Romántica	FM	94.3
Cojedes	San Carlos	Ritmo	Circuito Fiesta	FM	96.9
Delta Amacuro	Tucupita	Radio Tucupita	AM Center	AM	1270
Distrito Capital	Caracas	Fiesta	Circuito Fiesta	FM	106.5
Distrito Capital	Caracas	Hot	-	FM	94.1
Distrito Capital	Caracas	La Romántica	Circuito La Romántica	FM	88.9
Distrito Capital	Caracas	Life	-	FM	91.9
Distrito Capital	Caracas	Deportiva	Circuito Deportiva	AM	1300
Distrito Capital	Caracas	RQ	AM Center	AM	910
Falcón	Coro	La Romántica	Circuito La Romántica	FM	90.3
Falcón	Punto Fijo	Festiva	Circuito Fiesta	FM	101.3
Guárico	Calabozo	Chévere	Circuito Fiesta	FM	91.9
Guárico	Calabozo	Radio Los Llanos	AM Center	AM	1330
Guárico	San Juan de Los Morros	Radio Los Llanos	AM Center	AM	1060
Lara	Barquisimeto	Fiesta	Circuito Fiesta	FM	92.1
Lara	Barquisimeto	Sabrosa	-	FM	90.1
Lara	Barquisimeto	Somos	Circuito La Romántica	FM	88.7
Mérida	El Vigía	Panamericana Stereo	Circuito Fiesta	FM	99.3
Mérida	El Vigía/Mérida	Ondas Panamericanas	AM Center	AM	1270
Mérida	El Vigía/Mérida	Radio Mérida	AM Center	AM	1490
Mérida	Mérida	La Romántica	Circuito La Romántica	FM	88.7
Miranda	-	RQ	AM Center	AM	910
Miranda	Charallave	Sigma	Circuito La Romántica	FM	105.1
Miranda	Guarenas/Guatire	Sol Stereo	Circuito La Romántica	FM	88.5
Miranda	Valles del Tuy	YVTZ	AM Center	AM	1360
Monagas	Maturín	Fiesta	Circuito Fiesta	FM	102.1
Monagas	Maturín	La Romántica	Circuito La Romántica	FM	97.1
Nueva Esparta	Juan Griego	La Antillana	Circuito Fiesta	FM	92.9
Nueva Esparta	Porlamar	La Romántica	Circuito La Romántica	FM	98.9
Nueva Esparta	Porlamar	Radio Porlamar	AM Center	AM	1140
Portuguesa	Acarigua	Fiesta	Circuito Fiesta	FM	105.9
Sucre	Cumaná	RM	AM Center	AM	1580
Táchira	La Grita	Fascinación	Circuito Fiesta	FM	105.9
Táchira	La Grita	Radio Altura	AM Center	AM	820
Táchira	San Antonio del Táchira	La Romántica	Circuito La Romántica	FM	98.7
Táchira	San Antonio del Táchira	Radio Frontera	AM Center	AM	730
Táchira	San Cristóbal	La Romántica	Circuito La Romántica	FM	107.3
Táchira	San Cristóbal	Táchira	AM Center	AM	1000
Trujillo	Boconó/Trujillo	Jardín	Circuito La Romántica	FM	103.7
Trujillo	Boconó/Trujillo	Jardín	AM Center	AM	1460
Vargas	La Guaira	La Romántica	Circuito La Romántica	FM	90.3
Vargas	La Guaira	Tiburón	Circuito Fiesta	FM	94.9
Vargas	La Guaira	RQ	AM Center	AM	910
Zulia	Machiques	Romance	Circuito La Romántica	FM	104.3
Zulia	Machiques	Sierra	Circuito Fiesta	FM	99.1
Zulia	Maracaibo	Unión Stereo	Circuito La Romántica	FM	92.1

=== Traffic Center ===
Since the first broadcast in September 2000, Traffic Center delivers instant and effective status of transit in the Capital District of Caracas. It also informs drivers with alternative routes to avoid traffic and preventive campaigns about the many problems that affect Caracas transit system. The reports can be listened in 8 radio stations in and near Caracas: La Romántica 88.9 FM, 91.9 FM Center, Hot 94.1 FM, Fiesta 106.5 FM, El Hatillo 96.9 FM, Sol Stereo 88.5 FM, La Romántica 90.3 FM (Vargas), and Radio Recuerdos 1300 AM.

=== Other Products and Services ===
FM Center offers a wide variety of products and services to artists and general audiences. Among them are the recording studios located in its headquarters were several advertisements and songs have been recorded by numerous artists.

"FM Center es Noticia" (FM Center is News) and "AM Center es Noticia" are the names of the news services operated by FM Center. They are broadcast simultaneously in several of its radio stations. The average 2-minute reports deals with breaking national and international news, compiling headlines from many other news services. They have been awarded several times for their handling of news and objectivity of their reports.

Since its introduction 2007, "Showcenter Rodando" has become a pioneer in mobile media deployment in Venezuela. The unit consists of an oversized truck with broadcasting capabilities through its recording studio, and live performances on its roof/stage, complete with light and audio equipment. The vehicle drives to many cities in Venezuela, giving concerts and recording radio shows. It has also been used for special events such as the transmission of CONMEBOL's Copa América 2007.

FM Center also broadcasts several Venezuelan and international sporting events such as: Liga Venezolana de Béisbol Profesional (LVBP) League, Caribbean Series Championship, FIFA's World Cup Finals, CONMEBOL's Copa América and the best of the Olympic Games.

== Social Responsibility ==
Social responsibility in FM Center is enabled through the foundation "Fundación FM Center". Over the past years it has not only donated to communities in the traditional ways, but it has taken up the role of constructing the next generations for the radio industry in Venezuela. Through the program "Vive la Radio" (Live the Radio), "Fundación FM Center" seeks to give education to future operators, radio hosts, producers and sales executives, involved in the radio business.

As a response to moral decay in the Venezuelan society, FM Center relaunched the messages corresponding to the concept "Buen Ciudadano" (Good Citizen). They are directed into inducing proper and gregarious conducts to citizens by explaining the consequences of their actions and the effect in society. The voice is given by Martha Rodríguez Miranda, who became very famous in Venezuela for a televised version of it during the 80's and 90's, to the point she is sometimes known as "La Buena Ciudadana" (The Good Citizen).

== See also ==
- Fiesta 106.5 FM App
- Hot 94.1 FM App
- La Romántica 88.9 FM App
- Deportiva 1300 AM Center App
- RQ 910 AM App
- List of Companies of Venezuela
- List of radio stations in Venezuela
