= IBH =

IBH may refer to:

- India Book House
- International Briquettes Holding
- Institute for Better Health
- Individual Bali Hospitality
- Inyo Broadcast Holdings
