= Sidetur =

Siderúrgica del Turbio S.A.
- Industry: Steel
- Founded: 1948
- Headquarters: Caracas, Distrito Capital, Venezuela
- Area served: Venezuela and 25 other countries
- Products: reinforced bars, bars, beams, angles, flats and special steels
- Revenue: US $470 million (2007), ▲14% from 2006
- Parent: Siderúrgica de Venezuela S.A. Sivensa
- Website: www.sidetur.com.ve

Siderúrgica del Turbio S.A. (Sidetur) was a subsidiary of Siderúrgica de Venezuela S.A. (Sivensa), the biggest wholly private Venezuelan steel corporation. Their main products are rebars, bars, beams, angles and flats. Sidetur develops their exporting activity in more than 25 countries in the markets of America, Africa, Asia and Europe. Their seven operating plants are located in the states of Bolívar, Carabobo, Miranda, Lara and the Capital District. Additionally, Sidetur has 14 ferrous material collection centers located in various cities.

Founded in 1948 in Antímano, Caracas, Sidetur now has six plants, all in Venezuela.

In 1998, Sivensa suffered a strong crisis - mainly due to the Asian Crisis - which reduced the size of the company and generated a big debt. Thanks to high steel prices, the situation of the company is improving with the years. Nowadays, the company has a capacity of annual production of 835,000 tons of steelmaking, 615,000 tons of rolling and 67,000 of electric welding.

In 2010 Sidetur's assets were expropriated by the Chavez Government. As of May 21, 2013 no compensation was paid to former owners.

== Plants ==
All six of Sidetur's plants are located in Venezuela. Only two of them, Planta Barquisimeto and Planta Casima, are designed to melt steel into billets.

Plant Name	Year Built	Location	Products							
Plant Name	Year Built	Location	Rebars	Bars	Beams	Angles	Flats	Billets	Special Steels	Electric Welding
Planta Casima	1989	Puerto Ordaz, Bolívar State	No	No	No	No	No	Yes	No	No
Planta Antimano	1950	Caracas, Distrito Capital	Yes	Yes	No	No	No	No	No	No
Planta Guarenas	1986	Guarenas, Miranda State	Yes	Yes	No	Yes	Yes	No	Yes	No
Planta Valencia	1968	Valencia, Carabobo State	No	No	No	No	No	No	No	Yes
Planta Lara	2004	Barquisimeto, Lara State	No	Yes	No	Yes	Yes	No	No	No
Planta Barquisimeto	1972	Barquisimeto, Lara State	No	No	Yes	Yes	No	Yes	No	No

Sidetur ferrous material collection centers are located nationwide in Venezuela. The company serves the following cities and their neighboring areas:

- Caracas
- Guarenas
- Santa Lucía
- Valencia
- Cagua
- Barquisimeto
- Maracaibo
- Ciudad Ojeda
- El Vigía
- Barcelona
- Maturín
- El Tigre
- Puerto Ordaz
- Porlamar

== Production ==
The following table shows the production capacities of the different plants that Sidetur owns in metric tons per year.

Process	Plant							Total
Process	Casima	Antímano	Guarenas	Valencia	Lara	Barquisimeto	Collection Centers	Total
Steelmaking	460,000	-	-	-	-	375,000	-	835,000 t/year
Rolling	-	340,000	75,000	-	60,000	140,000	-	615,000 t/year
Electric Welding	-	-	-	67,000	-	-	-	67,000 t/year
Ferrous Material Collection	-	-	-	-	-	-	600,000	600,000 t/year

== See also ==
- List of Companies of Venezuela
- Siderúrgica de Venezuela S.A. (Sivensa)
- Steel
