= La Grita Province =

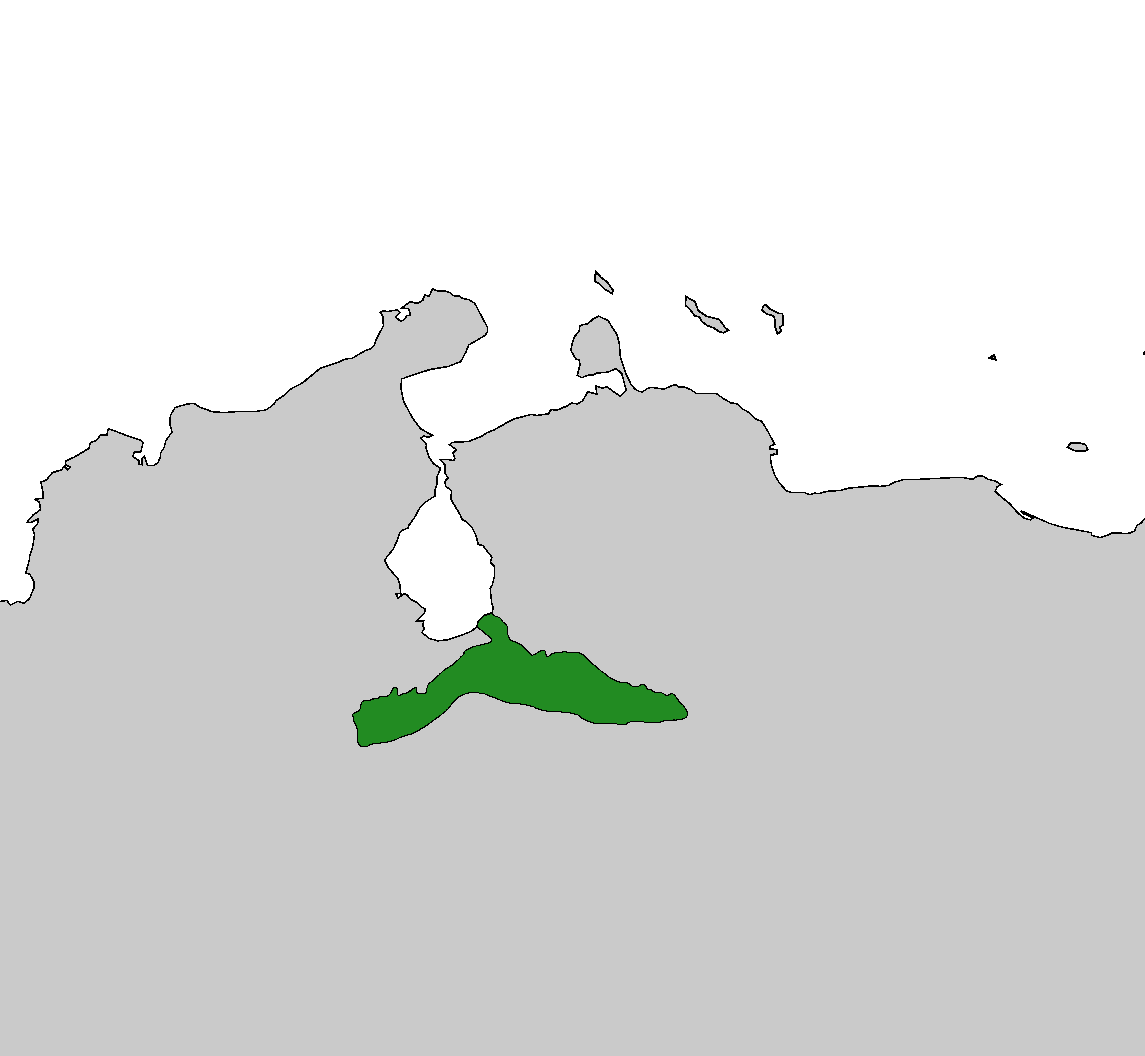
La Grita Province

La Grita Province was a province of the Spanish Empire in the 17th century (1576–1607), with La Grita (founded 1573) as its capital. In 1607 it merged with Mérida to form what became known as Mérida Province. It is now divided between Táchira, Mérida and Barinas states.
