= TV Caricuao =

TVCaricuao
- Type: Broadcast television network
- Branding: TVCaricuao
- Country: Venezuela
- Availability: Caricuao, Libertador Municipality, Venezuelan Capital District (UHF channel 66)
- Owner: TVCaricuao (a community foundation)
- Key people: Maria de Stefano R., legal representative
- Launch date: November 2002

TVCaricuao is a Venezuelan community television channel. It was created in November 2002 and can be seen in the community of Caricuao in the Libertador Municipality of the Capital District of Venezuela on UHF channel 66. Maria de Stefano R. and Lenin Bordones are the legal representative of the foundation that owns this channel.

== See also ==
- List of Venezuelan television channels
