= Michelena Municipality =

Municipality in Táchira, Venezuela

Michelena Municipality Municipio Michelena
- Municipality
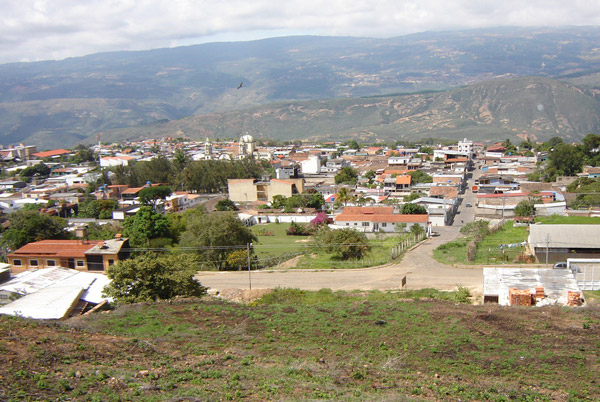

- Flag Seal

- Location in Táchira

- Location in Venezuela
- Country: Venezuela
- State: Táchira
- Founded: 1849
- Municipal seat: Michelena

Government
  - Mayor: Carlos Chávez Chávez (PSUV)

Area
  - Total: 143.6 km^{2} (55.4 sq mi)

Population (2017)
  - Total: 22,953
  - Density: 159.8/km^{2} (414.0/sq mi)
- Time zone: UTC−4 (VET)

Michelena Municipality is one of the 29 municipalities in Táchira state, Venezuela. The municipality has a total surface of 135 km^{2} and it has some 22,953 inhabitants (2017 census). Its capital is Michelena.
