= TV Petare =

- Type: Broadcast television network
- Branding: TV Petare
- Country: Venezuela
- Availability: Petare, Sucre Municipality, Miranda State (UHF channel 60)
- Owner: Fundación Comunitaria Televisora de Petare (community foundation)
- Key people: Charles Mendez, legal representative
- Launch date: July 2002

The Fundacion Comunitaria Televisora de Petare (TV Petare), is a Venezuelan television station that was created in July 2002. Its specific objective is to serve the people living in the municipality of Sucre in the Miranda State.

This television station is made up of a diverse group of people living in different areas throughout the Caracas neighborhood of Petare.

== See also ==
- List of Venezuelan television channels
