= Teletambores TV =

Local television station in Venezuela

Teletambores
- Francisco Linares Alcantara Municipality, Aragua State; Venezuela
- Channels: Analog: 40 (UHF)

Ownership
- Owner: Fundación Televisora Comunitaria Teletambores

History
- First air date: 2000

Teletambores is a community television station on channel 40 in the municipality of Francisco Linares Alcantara Municipality, Aragua State, Venezuela.

== History ==
Teletambores began broadcasting in 2000, before Venezuela had a defined legal class of community television stations, and was an outgrowth of the Spanish: Escuela Popular de Cine de Maracay (Maracay Popular Film School). A concession was received to legally operate in May 2002.

== See also ==
- List of Venezuelan television channels
