= TV Bailadores =

TV station in Bailadores, Mérida State, Venezuela

- Type: Broadcast television network
- Country: Venezuela
- Availability: Bailadores, Rivas Davila Municipality, Merida State (UHF channel 64)
- Owner: Organizacion de Medios Comunitarios de Bailadores
- Key people: Carlos Andrés Pérez, legal representative
- Launch date: July 2004

TV Bailadores is a Venezuelan community television channel. It was created in July 2004 and can be seen in the community of Bailadores in the Rivas Davila Municipality of the Mérida State of Venezuela on UHF channel 64.

== See also ==
- List of Venezuelan television channels
