= Survisión =

Venezuelan community television channel

Survision
- Type: Broadcast television network
- Country: Venezuela
- Availability: Canagua, Arzobispo Chacon Municipality, Merida State (UHF channel 64)
- Owner: Libertad TV (a community foundation)
- Key people: Marco Antonio Torres, legal representative
- Launch date: September 2004

Survision is a Venezuelan community television channel. It was created in September 2004 and can be seen in the community of Canagua in the Arzobispo Chacon Municipality of the Mérida State of Venezuela on UHF channel 64. Marco Antonio Torres is the legal representative of the foundation that owns this channel.

As of now, Survision does not have a website.

== See also ==
- List of Venezuelan television channels
