= Rivas Dávila Municipality =

Rivas Dávila Municipality Municipio Rivas Dávila
- Municipality
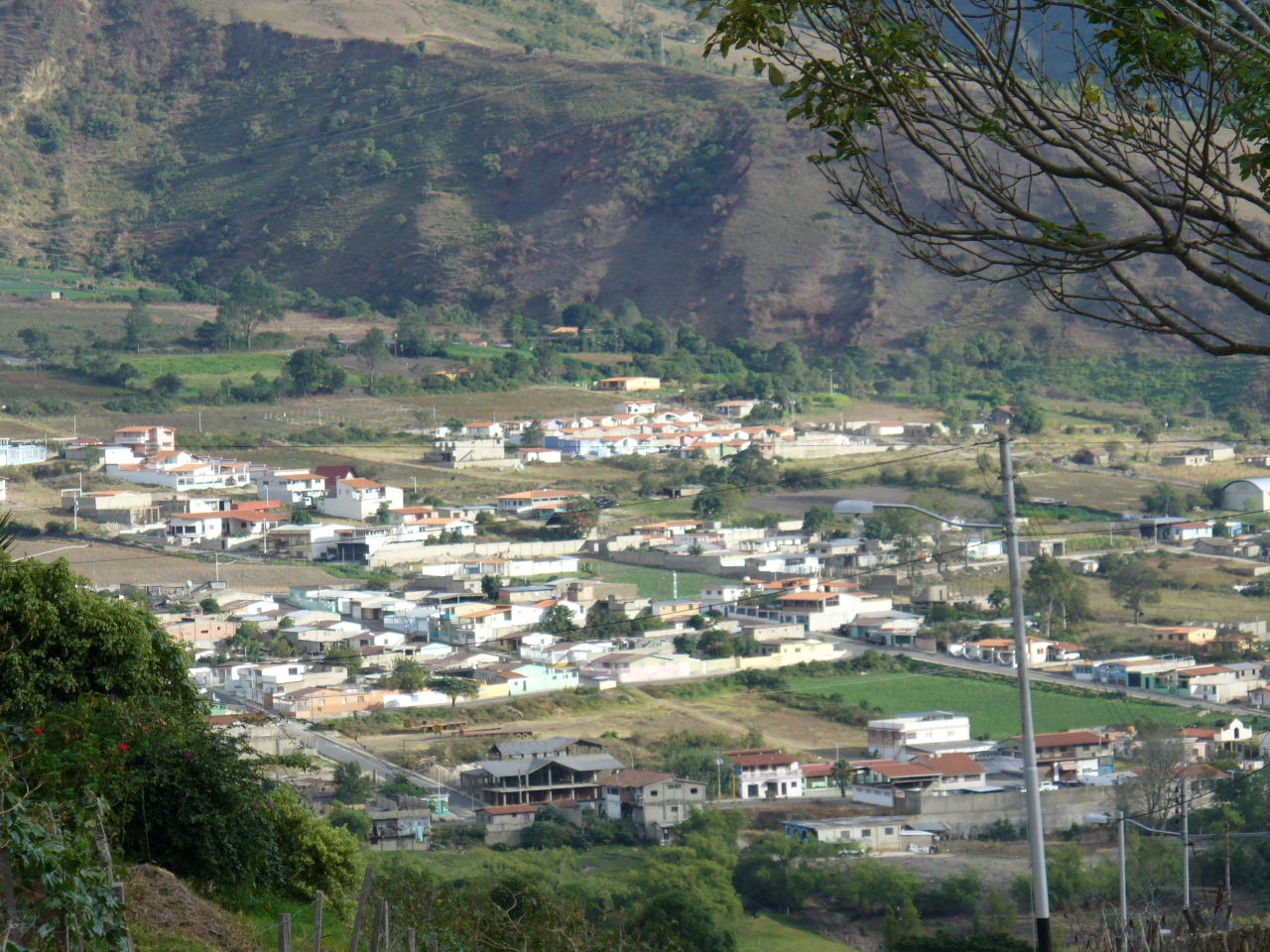

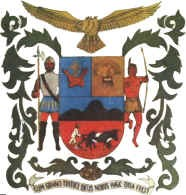
- Flag Coat of arms

- Location in Trujillo

- Location in Venezuela
- Coordinates: 8°15′22″N 71°49′36″W
- Country: Venezuela
- State: Mérida
- Established: 6 August 1988
- Municipal seat: Bailadores

Government
  - Mayor: Carla Pérez (PSUV)

Area
  - Total: 187 km^{2} (72 sq mi)
- Elevation: 1,700 m (5,600 ft)

Population (2011)
  - Total: 20,128
  - Density: 108/km^{2} (279/sq mi)
- Time zone: UTC−4 (VET)

Rivas Dávila is one of the 23 municipalities of the state of Mérida, Venezuela. The municipality occupies an area of 187 km^{2} with a population of 20,128 inhabitants according to the 2011 census.

== Parishes ==
The municipality consists of the following two parishes, with their capitals listed in parentheses:

- Bailadores (Bailadores)
- Gerónimo Maldonado (La Playa)
