= Global TV (Venezuela) =

- Type: Broadcast Television Network
- Country: Venezuela
- Availability: Zulia State on UHF channel 65
- Key people: Guido Briceño, President of Global TV
- Launch date: 1990
- Official website: Global TV

Global TV is a Venezuelan regional television channel that can be seen in the Zulia State, located in western Venezuela, on UHF channel 65. It can also be seen on channel 10 by those who subscribe to Netuno and on channel 69 by those who subscribe to Intercable.

== History ==
Global TV was created in the year 1990 as a television production company. It soon became one of the largest production companies in the Zulia State, producing commercials and audiovisual works. Since the beginning, Global TV has been producing the show Primicias, which is a political opinion program hosted by Guido Briceño, who is also the president of Global TV's parent company.

After about ten years of being a production company, it was consolidated as television channel with regional coverage. It currently has a variety of different types of shows. Global TV has an alliance with the Caracas television channel, Canal Maximo Televisión (CMT), in which they share some of their programs.

== See also ==
- List of Venezuelan television channels
