= TELE N =

Venezuelan TV channel

- Type: Broadcast television network
- Branding: TELE N
- Country: Venezuela
- Availability: Zulia State

TELE N was a Venezuelan regional news network based in the western Venezuelan city of Maracaibo in the Zulia State. It could be seen in the entire Zulia State. Reporters and journalists for TELE N were: Ambar Simancas, Andreina Socorro, Ángela Romero, Daniel Pereira, Angélica Villegas, Grace Orta, Henry Ramírez, Hugo Sánchez, Jesús Ramírez, Joandry Monsalve, José Ramos, Juan Carlos Fernández, Juan Garcia, Julio Eduardo Torrents, Katy Ferrer, Mandy Perozo, Laura Ippólito, Dr. Patricia Lubo, María Eugenia Perozo, Mattew Bello, Tahina Villa, Zulbert Marín. After years of struggling, the station was sold and it is now operated under a new name and new administration by a Chavez-like party.

== Programming ==
The following is a list of the programs saw on TELE N. These shows are news, information, and opinion shows:

- Buenos Días Zulia - With José Ramos.
- Sólo Estrellas - With Grace Orta.
- Escápate - With Katy Ferrer.
- Hablando con las comunidades - With Ángela Romero.
- Noticias en Red - With Zulbert Marín.
- En la Onda - With Mandy Perozo.
- Telemarket
- La Vida es Así - With Julio Eduardo Torrents.
- Palabreando - With Andreina Socorro.
- Historias Nuestras - With Ámbar Simancas.
- A Punto - With Juan Carlos Fernández.
- Joyas para tu Casa - With María Eugenia Perozo.
- Noticiero Tele N - With Daniel Pereira, Angélica Villegas, Tahina Villa, Ángela Romero, and Mattew Bello.
- Avanza - With Henry Ramírez.
- Rueda de Periodistas - With Ángela Romero, Tahina Villa, Angélica Villegas, Daniel Pereira, and Mattew Bello.
- Más Salud Más Vida - With Dr. Patricia Lubo.

== See also ==
- List of Venezuelan television channels
