= Sivensa =

Venezuelan Company

Siderúrgica Venezolana S.A.
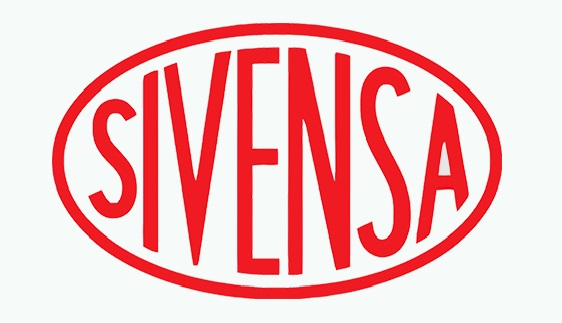
- Type: Public (BVC: SVS)
- Industry: Steel
- Founded: (1948)
- Headquarters: Caracas, Venezuela
- Products: Steel
- Revenue: ▼US$ 1.7 billion (2009)
- Net income: ▼US$ 23.7 million (2009)
- Number of employees: 2,800 (2008)
- Subsidiaries: International Briquette Holding; Siderúrgica del Turbio, S.A.
- Website: www.sivensa.com.ve

Sivensa (BVC: SVS) is the second largest Venezuelan steel producer. SIDOR, which was nationalized in 2008, is the largest. However, Sivensa, founded in 1948, has been Venezuela's largest steel producer in the private-sector as of 2008.

== History ==
The corporate documents for Siderúrgica Venezolana, S.A., were registered in October 1948. The company was started with capital of two million bolívars; (Note: In 1948 the exchange rate ranged from 3.09 to 4.80 bolívars per US dollar, making the value of two million bolívars range from about $647,249 to $416,666.67. Adjusting the value in US dollars for inflation from 1948, the value on January 16, 2015, would range from $6,357,974 to $4,092,946, assuming a cumulative rate of change of 882.3%. The data used to determine the cumulative rate of change was culled from the CPI published on January 16, 2015. An online version of the calculator can be found at www.coinnews.net. The range of historical exchange rates are found under the article, "Currency of Venezuela") its largest founding shareholder was Miles Meyer Sherover (1896–1976), an Israeli-American. Other founding shareholders included Robert Turgot Brinsmade (1913–1994), an American international lawyer, Warren William Smith (1865–1956), a U.S. citizen, Oscar Augusto Machado (1890–1966), a Venezuelan, and Carlos Morales, a Venezuelan. Its founding objective was to produce steel rebar, wire rods, structures, and other steel products.

The first cast by Sivensa was in 1950, and that year, the company reached a production capacity of five tons per year. In 1956, Sherover became president, a position he held until 1959, when Oscar Machado Zuloaga took over. Angel Cervini replaced him until 1979.

By 1957, the Antímano plant in Caracas was producing 65,000 tons of steel rebar using obsolete machinery and equipment. That year, Sivensa acquired a 50% stake in Recuperadora General Venezolana C.A. (Regeveca), which bought and sold scrap metal in the country.

In 1998, Sivensa suffered a substantial crisis — mainly due to the Asian crisis — which reduced the size of the company and generated a substantial debt. Has one main division, International Briquettes Holding (IBH), which sells briquettes and iron pellets.

In 2010, the Venezuelan government expropriated Sivensa's largest and most important subsidiary, Sidetur, which sells steel. After higher steel prices improved the financial situation following the Asian crisis, the government nationalized Sidetur. The plants, those still owned by Sivensa and those that were expropriated, are all located in Venezuela. Nine operating plants are located in the states of Bolívar, Carabobo, Miranda, Lara, and the Federal District. Additionally, Sidetur has 14 ferrous material collection centers located in various cities.

== See also ==
- List of Venezuelan companies
- Siderúrgica del Turbio S.A. (Sidetur)
