= Aeroexpresos Ejecutivos, C.A. =

- Company type: Private company
- Industry: Transportation
- Founded: 1990
- Headquarters: Caracas, Venezuela
- Products: Passenger Travels; Cargo Transportation
- Revenue: ▲ Bs. ? billion (2006)
- Operating income: ▲ Bs. ? billion (2006)
- Net income: ▼ Bs. ? billion (2006)
- Number of employees: ??? (2006)
- Subsidiaries: Aeroexpresos Ejecutivos, C.A. TE3000 Turismo Ejecutivo, C.A. Aeroexpresos Encomiendas, C.A.
- Website: Aero Expresos

Aeroexpresos Ejecutivos, C.A., Is a company specialized in passenger transportation and cargo transportation. It's located in Caracas, Venezuela.

== Subsidiaries ==
- Passenger Transportation
  - Aeroexpresos Ejecutivos, C.A.
  - Turismo Ejecutivo, C.A. (TE 3000)
- Cargo Transportation
  - Aeroexpresos Encomiendas, C.A.
