= Fierro Group =

Spanish banking and industrial company

Grupo Iberoamericano de Fomento or Grupo IF
- Company type: Private
- Industry: Banking; Industrial
- Founded: 1961
- Headquarters: Spain
- Products: Banking Services; Liquors; Matches; Foods more...
- Subsidiaries: Banco Exterior (Venezuela); Tanasa (Venezuela); Banco Interamericano de Finanzas (Peru); Fosforera Nacional (Venezuela) more...

The IF Group, also known as Grupo Iberoamericano de Fomento or Grupo Fierro, is an economic group that originated in Spain and has investments in Spain and Latin America, mostly in the industrial and financial sectors. Ildefonso Fierro, a prominent Spanish businessman, founded the Fierro Group. The group is worth over US$4 billion with an annual net income in excess of US$300 million. The Fierro Group started operations in Peru in 1961 by installing a match factory, a product in which they are a world leader. In 2001 the Fierro Group in Peru was led by Manuel Isabal Roca and consisted of 18 companies, including Banco Interamericano de Finanzas (BIF), Fosforera Peruana, Tabacalera Nacional, Aval, Representaciones Alpamayo, Filtros del Perú, Destilería Peruana, Tabacalera del Sur, Industrial Cartavio, Verona Trading, and Fosforera La Llama, employing around 5,000 staff between them.

Nowadays, Fierro Group in Venezuela (also known as Grupo Industrial Farallón de Venezuela: GIFVEN) has the first place in the share market on match industry sales, being also the owners of different companies such as FOSUCA and DIFSA. Fierro Group companies had factories such as Lander & Vera and Alimentos La Giralda, which produce and distribute different manufactured goods related to liquors and canned food. Its most recognized brands are Fosforos el Sol, La Giralda, Ponche Imperial, Ruskaya, and Licores Lander & Vera, among others.

== History ==
In Ecuador, on October 24, 1958, Ignacio Fierro founded the company Fosforera Ecuatoriana S.A. (FESA).

In 1991 in Venezuela, the group owned Tabacalera Nacional (TANASA), today owned by Philip Morris, Fosforera Suramericana, Alimentos La Giralda, and Banco Exterior.

In August 2013, Francisco "Paco" Roche Navarro retired as leader of the Grupo IF banking division. Ex-BBVA Vicente de la Parra was brought in to lead the banking division. The Banks are composed of Banco Exterior (Venezuela), Banco Internacional (Ecuador), EBNA Bank (Curaçao), Interbanco (Guatemala), and BanBif (Peru).

Other companies created include Tabacalera Nacional S.A. (Tanasa), acquired fully by Philip Morris in 2005; Seguros Cervantes; Grafandina S.A.; Industria Licorera Iberoamericana S.A. (ILSA); and PetroSud (Consorcio PetroSud-PetroRiva). In 2008 the leader of the Fierro Group in Ecuador was José Enrique Fuster Camps.

== Alimentos La Giralda ==
Alimentos La Giralda
- Company type: ?
- Industry: Foods
- Founded: 1944
- Headquarters: Caracas, Distrito Capital, Venezuela
- Products: Capers, Pickles, Olives, etc.
- Revenue: ▲ Bs. ? billion (2006)
- Net income: ▼ Bs. ? billion (2006)

Alimentos La Giralda is a Venezuelan trading company that imports, produces, and distributes foodstuffs such as capers, pickles, olives, canned fruits, and canned vegetables. It is located in Caracas. The brand "La Giralda" was registered in 1944 by Francisco Gomez Lopez using what used to be the emblem of the Spanish association of olive exporters.

In 1979, after buying the brand from Francisco Lopez Gomez, Enrique Moreno de la Cova and the Barceló family founded Alimentos La Giralda, and Enrique became president of the company until 1983. In 1982 it was purchased by the Fierro Group. It is one of the leaders in the Venezuelan market.

== International presence ==
- Spain
- Argentina
- Brazil
- Colombia
- Guatemala
- Ecuador
- Peru
- Thailand
- Venezuela
