= Radio Valencia Televisión =

Venezuelan television station

Radio Valencia Televisión (1958 - 1962) was a Venezuelan regional television network based in Valencia, Carabobo State.

== History ==
On April 30, 1958, Radio Valencia Televisión, channel 13, began operating its test signal, and was officially inaugurated on September 20, 1958. Its principal investors were Miguel Aché and Teodoro Gubaira, both from Radio, Valencia. It was the first regional television initiative in Venezuela.

In 1962, Radio Valencia Televisión ceased its activities and was acquired by Teleinversiones, a company belonging to Diego Cisneros Bermúdez, and it began operating under the name Teletrece. The station shut down in 1969. The Television Factbook still listed Teletrece long after its closure, as late as 1997.

== See also ==
- List of Venezuelan over-the-air television networks and stations
