= ULA TV =

University television station in Mérida, Venezuela

Universidad de Los Andes Televisión
- Mérida, Mérida; Venezuela
- Channels: Analog: 22 (UHF)

Ownership
- Owner: Universidad de Los Andes

History
- First air date: October 25, 1999
- Last air date: June 15, 2017

Links
- Website: www.tv.ula.ve

Universidad de Los Andes Televisión, abbreviated ULA TV, was a television station in Mérida, Mérida, Venezuela, that was owned by the Universidad de Los Andes. The station began broadcasting in 1999 and was shuttered by the National Commission of Telecommunications (CONATEL) on June 15, 2017.

== History ==
On September 10, 1993, ULA proposed the establishment of a UHF television station to serve the city of Mérida. Channel 22 was assigned by CONATEL in 1994, but it would be more than five years before the station began broadcasting. The station went on the air with a test pattern on October 2, 1999, and programs began on October 25. It was originally known as Aula 22 ("Classroom 22") before adopting the ULA TV moniker.

=== Closure ===
They're doing the same thing to us that they did to RCTV.

— Mario Bonucci Rossini, rector of the Universidad de Los Andes

On June 15, 2017, CONATEL representatives presented the station with an order to shut down due to what it claimed were violations of Venezuelan telecommunications law, which came as a surprise to the service's 100 staff. Once news of the closure spread, students of the university began protests outside the studios, stating that the closure had been ordered by the state governor, Alexis Ramírez, because opposition figures appeared on ULA TV and had called for a national strike on a ULA TV program, statements which Ramírez declared "criminal acts".

== See also ==
- List of Venezuelan television channels
