= Ediciones Ekare =

Ediciones Ekaré.
- Company type: non-profit organization
- Industry: Publishing; Children's Books
- Founded: Caracas (1978)
- Headquarters: Caracas, Venezuela
- Key people: Carmen Diana Dearden Co-founder; Veronica Uribé Co-founder
- Number of employees: 26
- Website: Ekare.com

Ediciones Ekare (lit. "Ekare Editions", the word ekare from Pemon meaning "true") is a Venezuelan based children's book Publisher. Ekaré began in 1978 in Caracas, Venezuela and its initial goal was to publish books which reflected the Venezuelan and Latin American culture and landscape. This was directly related to the experience in public and school libraries of the Banco del Libro, a non-profit organization that promotes reading and books. The catalog includes original works as well as translations of publications in other languages.

Ekaré has offices in Caracas, Venezuela, Santiago, Chile and Barcelona, Spain. It publishes books both in Spanish and Catalán.

== History ==
Ekare Editions, directed by Carmen Diana Dearden and Veronica Uribe, began in 1978 as a department of the Banco del Libro, with the publication of El rabipelado burlado (The Hoodwinked Possum), a story from the Pemón ethnic group. This was the first title of the Indigenous Tales Collection, one of Ekare's iconic collections. During its first years, Ekare filled a void in the production of quality children's books in Latin America. This enabled the publishing house to have a sustained development and be recognized by specialists and public in general, both in Venezuela and abroad. In 1989, because of this sustained growth, Ekare became a separate entity from the Banco del Libro, with its own legal status as a recognized Publishing House and secured a presence in various Latin American countries and The United States, thanks to local distributors. In 1996 it opened offices in Santiago, Chile (Ekare Sur Editions) and in 2002 in Barcelona, Spain (Ekare Europa). Ekare books have been translated into more than 15 languages, among them German, complex and simplified Chinese, Korean, Danish, Icelandic, Swedish French, Dutch, English, Italian, Japanese, Norwegian, Portuguese and Euskera and Papiamento. Conversely, approximately 40% of the Publishing House's catalogue is made up of books translated from other countries, such as England, United States, Australia, and Japan. Ekare is considered a pioneering house in picture book publishing in Latin America.

It has published works by Monika Doppert, Ana Maria Machado, Aquiles Nazoa, Teresa Duran, Javier Saez Castán, Marta Carrasco, Antonio Skarmeta, Alexis Deacon, Satoshi Kitamura, Ron Brooks, Margaret Wild, Helen Oxenbury, Tomi Ungerer, Arnold Lobel, Leo Lionni, Ed Young, Max Velthuijs, Eugenio Montejo, David McKee, Arnal Ballester, Emilio Urberuaga, Rocío Martínez, Fernando Krahn, Marua de la Luz Uribe, Irene Savino, Kurusa, Alba Marina Rivera, among others.

== Collections ==
- Pikinini
- El jardín de los niños
- Ponte poronte
- Narraciones indígenas
- Así vivimos
- Libros del todo el mundo
- Serie Sapo
- Mis primeras lecturas
- Rimas adivinanzas
- Clave de sol
- Libros de oro
- Hojas sueltas
