= Camunare Rojo TV =

Venezuelan community television channel

- Type: Broadcast television network
- Country: Venezuela
- Availability: Urachiche, Urachiche Municipality, Yaracuy State (UHF channel 61)
- Owner: Camunare Rojo (a community foundation)
- Key people: Wendy Duran, legal representative
- Launch date: December 2003

Camunare Rojo TV is a Venezuelan community television channel. In December 2003, CONATEL, together with the community of Urachiche, created Camunare Rojo TV. Camunare Rojo TV is currently on the air for about three hours a day and all of their programs are related to politics, the economy, and the social situation in the community during the "Bolivarian Revolution". Camunare Rojo TV signed an agreement with TeleSUR in March 2006, so that they could broadcast TeleSUR's newscast. Camunare Rojo TV serves a population of about three thousand.

== See also ==
- List of Venezuelan television channels
