= Televisora Comunitaria de Rubio =

Televisora Comunitaria de Rubio "now repetidora of Vive Andes"
- Type: Broadcast television network
- Branding: TV Rubio
- Country: Venezuela
- Availability: Rubio, Junin Municipality, Tachira State (UHF channel 33)
- Owner: Televisora Comunitaria de Rubio (a community foundation)
- Key people: Jose Angel Manrique, legal representative
- Launch date: May 20, 2006
- Official website: TV Rubio

Televisora Comunitaria de Rubio (or TV Rubio) is a Venezuelan community television station located in and seen by the people living in the town of Rubio in the Tachira State. It can be seen on UHF channel 33.

== History ==
The project of creating a community television station for the residents of Rubio in the Táchira State dates back to 1995. In the early hours of November 10, 2005, equipment belonging to the future television station were stolen through a hole in the ceiling of its transmission facility on El Campanario hill in Rubio. On May 20, 2006, TV Rubio finally went on the air. It reaches a population of about 70,000.

== See also ==
- List of Venezuelan television channels
