= Canal Maximo Televisión =

Venezuelan television network

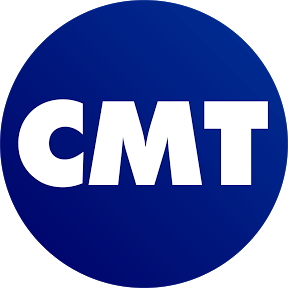
- Type: Terrestrial television network
- Country: Venezuela
- Broadcast area: Caracas, Barquisimeto, San Cristóbal, Calabozo, Puerto Ordaz, and all of the Miranda and Zulia States
- Transmitters: 51 (Caracas, Barquisimeto, and all of the Miranda State); 43 (Calabozo, Puerto Ordaz, and all of the Zulia State); 21(San Cristóbal)

Ownership
- Owner: Grupo U.P. Constructora Pedeca, C.A.
- Key people: Dr. Umberto Petricca Zugaro, owner & founder

History
- Launched: 1993
- Founder: Umberto Petricca Zugaro
- Closed: December 11, 2006
- Former names: Canal Metropolitano Televisión

Links
- Website: CMT

Canal Maximo Televisión (CMT) was a Venezuelan free-to-air television network that was seen on UHF channel 51 in the metropolitan area of Caracas, Barquisimeto, and the Miranda State, channel 43 in Calabozo, Puerto Ordaz, and the Zulia State, and channel 21 in San Cristóbal.

== History ==
In 1993, Umberto Petricca Zugaro founded Canal Metropolitano Televisión (CMT) and received government authorization to begin its testing phase. It was one of the first television stations to broadcast on an ultra high frequency (UHF) channel in Venezuela. Their studios were located in the Caracas neighborhood of Los Cortijos de Lourdes.

In their first year, CMT was on the air five hours a day (6:00 pm to 11:00 pm) and reached 75% of the city of Caracas from a transmitter located in the neighborhood of Colinas de los Caobos.

In 1995, CMT began broadcasting 18 hours a day and moved to their studios in Boleíta Norte.

In 1999, Canal Metropolitano Televisión changed its name to Canal Maximo Televisión, but kept the CMT branding.

In 2000, CMT inaugurated a powerful satellite teleport, enabling it to send its signal to other areas of the country.

In 2001, CMT increased their reach by way of a satellite. Their signal began to arrive in San Cristóbal (channel 21), Barinas (under the name Telellanos), Calabozo, Puerto Ordaz, and on small cable companies.

CMT received the broadcasting rights for Miss Global Venezuela 2006 and Miss Global International 2006; however, on December 11, 2006, the installations of this channel were purchased by the Venezuelan government so that teleSUR could broadcast over the air in parts of the country. CMT did not possess a wide network, nor a high quality of broadcasting, and since it is such a small channel when compared to other media outlets in the country, it wasn't included in the channel roster of the vast majority of cable TV providers. They also lacked a website, since the domain CMT was put on sale a while back.

== Criticism ==
CMT, as well as other television networks in Venezuela, was accused of participating in the coup d'état against President Hugo Chávez.

== Programming ==
=== List of programs formerly broadcast by CMT ===
==== Variety ====
- Mujeres y Algo Más (co-hosted by Mariana Carles, who also worked as a news presenter on the evening edition of El Observador at the national television network, Radio Caracas Televisión)
- Sabor a Chef
- Cocina Internacional
- Alquimia del Chef
- Tae-Tek
- Conectate con Tu Cuerpo
- Pasaje al Mas Allá
- Viendo lo Invisible
- Tempe Cume
- Arquitecto de los Sueños
- Techo Propio
- Construcción Inmobiliaria
- Lo Mejor de Venezuela
- Viajeros
- Querencias Venezolanas
- Punto Cero
- Mundo Latino
- Vuelo en Parapente
- El Mágico Mundo del Cine
- Vacilatexto
- Grandes Musicales
- Fandango
- Destino X
- Sabor Tropical
- Moda Más Moda
- Versión Real
- María Elvira Confronta
- Medicina en Capsula
- Revista Medica
- Por Su Seguridad
- 2 Minutos

==== Children's Programming ====
- Que Tal Chamo
- Hermanos

==== Sports ====
- Grand Slam
- Perfil Deportivo
- Basket Report
- Rugen Los Motores
- CMT Deportes
- Futbol Report
- Mundiales del Futbol
- Conexión Con el Beisbol
- Magazine Hípico
- Favoritos de Cabalgata Hípica

==== Information ====
- CMT Noticias (two daily editions)

==== Opinion ====
- Visión Informativa con Italo Luongo
- Compas Internacional
- Teodoro Que Dice? (hosted by Teodoro Petkoff, ex-presidential candidate)

== Evolution of the CMT logo ==
CMT's logo from 1999 to 2001

CMT's final logo

== See also ==
- List of Venezuelan television channels
- List of local television stations in South America
- List of Spanish-language television channels
- List of South American television stations
