= Tarmas TV =

- Type: Broadcast television network
- Country: Venezuela
- Availability: Vargas State (UHF channel 60)
- Owner: Tarmas Comunicacion Libre y Alternativa (a community foundation)
- Key people: Wilfredo Garcia, legal representative
- Launch date: December 2002

Tarmas TV is a Venezuelan community television channel. It was created in December 2002 and can be seen in the Vargas State of Venezuela on UHF channel 60. Wilfredo Garcia is the legal representative of the foundation that owns this channel.

The station was one of eleven community stations licensed by CONATEL between 2000 and 2003.

As of now, Tarmas TV does not have a website.

== See also ==
- List of Venezuelan television channels
