= Canal 11 Televisión =

Former TV station in Caracas, Venezuela

Canal Once
- Country: Venezuela
- Headquarters: Caracas, Distrito Capital, Venezuela

Programming
- Language: Spanish

Ownership
- Owner: Amable Espina (Screen Gems)
- Key people: Ricardo Espina; Amable Espina

History
- Launched: 27 July 1966; 59 years ago 1 December 1966; 59 years ago (officially)
- Closed: 22 May 1968; 58 years ago

Canal 11 Televisión was a short-lived television channel based in Caracas, Venezuela. It first went on the air in July 1966 and ceased operations due to bankruptcy less than two years later.

== History ==
Much like every other major television station in Venezuela in the 1950s and 60s, Canal 11 was set up with aid from American companies.

Canal 11 was set up with assistance from Gilette, MGM and technical support from American production company Screen Gems (the latter having, alongside Amable Espina, partial ownership of the channel). The station's founders were brothers Ricardo and Amable Espina (Amable Espina was a director at Radio Caracas Televisión). Amable built Canal 11 with a team of first-class actors and professionals.

At 5pm on July 27, 1966, Canal 11 started broadcasting, with the presence of American model and actress Jayne Mansfield. Programming included television series, live programming, comedy shows and sports, Canal 11's mascot was a rabbit, depicted in its launch advertisement in the press entering a rocket. It was formally inaugurated on December 1 that same year. The inauguration ceremony happened at the former Bolívar Films building, where the channel broadcast from.

The promise of bringing first-class celebrities gave Américo Montero the opportunity to join the group of exclusive artists of this new channel, among whom were: Gina Alvaner, Daniel Farías, Enrique Faillace, Hugo Pimentel, José Poveda, Bárbara Teyde, Jorge Palacios, Luis Gerardo Tovar, Ulises Brenner and Pedro Marthan, among others. Ricardo and Amable Espina aimed for a new concept in television and its opening week announced the reappearance of actress Zoe Ducós through the channel with the production "Orgullo De Casta"; as well as the debut roles of Espartaco Santoni with Liliana Durán and María Luisa Lamata in the telenovela "Mi Secreto Me Condena" in 1967.

The channel was failing due to the fact that it was available only in Caracas, on May 22, 1968, the Second Tribunal in the Mercantile Jurisdiction of Venezuela decreed the bankruptcy of Canal 11 Televisión, which, by mid 1967, ran into financial problems. At the end of that year, the employees of the station had taken over control of the company. The channel was later taken off the air.

The channel 11 frequency was never given to another player since then. Neighboring frequencies 10 and 12 were given to Televen and Omnivisión respectively in the late 1980s.

== Programming ==
Canal 11 broadcast American television series, among them:

- Bonanza
- I Love Lucy
- Whirlybirds

National programs included:

- Gran Programa del Millón
- Uge y Juanito (children's program hosted by the titular clowns)

The channel also produced four telenovelas:

- Amargo Silencio (1967)
- El Bastardo (1966)
- Mi Secreto Me Condena (1967)
- Secretos de Alcoba (1966, starring Enrique Faillace)

== See also ==
- List of Venezuelan over-the-air television networks and stations
