= Canal i =

Venezuelan TV news channel

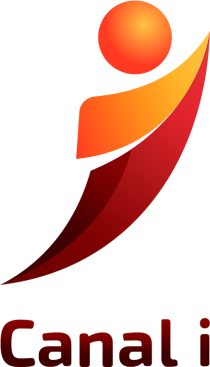
- Type: Broadcast television network
- Country: Venezuela

Programming
- Picture format: HDTV 1080i (downscaled to 480i for the SD feed)

Ownership
- Owner: El País Televisión
- Key people: Wilmer Ruperti (owner, founder, and president)

History
- Launched: October 5, 2007
- Founder: Wilmer Ruperti

Links
- Website: www.canal-i.com

Availability

Terrestrial
- Analog UHF: Channel 29 (Caracas, listings may vary)
- Digital UHF: Channel 23.6

Canal i is a privately owned 24-news channel based in Caracas, Venezuela, which can be seen over-the-air in the cities of Caracas, Maracaibo, and Barquisimeto on channels 57, 53, and 63 respectively. It was officially inaugurated on October 5, 2007.

== History ==
Canal i was officially inaugurated on October 5, 2007, taking over the signal of the now defunct music channel, Puma TV. Canal i is a 24-hour news channel; it is the fourth Venezuelan 24-hour news channel to be founded after Globovisión, Canal de Noticias, and TeleSUR. The president of Canal i, Wilmer Ruperti, invested $ 21 million in order to establish the network.

The idea to create Canal i dates back to 2004 when Ruperti purchased Puma TV, however, the project was delayed until 2006. Canal i aims to provide a fair and balanced news programming that does not have any political affiliations. Some of Canal i's presenters include Carlos Escarrá, a pro-Chávez congressperson and member of the United Socialist Party of Venezuela, and Julio Borges, the leader of Justice First, the second largest opposition party.

On March 13, 2020, the channel, along with others in the country, experienced interruptions in its broadcast signal and on cable operators due to the VENESAT-1 satellite going out of orbit, which was announced on March 25 of that year.

In September 2023, Canal I became the official broadcaster of the Tiburones de La Guaira baseball team, after the team was acquired by Ruperti. That same year, the channel debuted its coverage of the Venezuelan Professional Baseball League, and in 2024, it broadcast the 2024 Caribbean Series.

At the beginning of 2025, the channel changed its terrestrial broadcast frequencies in Caracas and Maracaibo, from channel 55 to channel 29, and from channel 53 to channel 43, respectively.

In February 11, 2026, the channel will debut a new image, logo, and the return of its live morning magazines to the programming schedule.
