= Montaña TV =

Venezuelan television channel

- Type: Broadcast television network
- Country: Venezuela
- Availability: Cordero, Andrés Bello Municipality, Tachira State (UHF channel 69)
- Owner: Montaña TV (a community foundation)
- Key people: Jose G. Chacon, legal representative
- Launch date: October 2004

Montaña TV is a Venezuelan community television channel. It was created in October 2004 and can be seen in the community of Cordero in the Andres Bello Municipality of Tachira State on UHF channel 69. Jose G. Chacon is the legal representative of the foundation that owns this channel.

== See also ==
- List of Venezuelan television channels
- Documental of a InstallFest filmed by Montaña TV
