= Zuliana de Televisión =

Zuliana de Television
- Type: Broadcast Television Network
- Branding: Zuliana TV or ZUTV
- Country: Venezuela
- Availability: Zulia State
- Key people: Gilberto Urdaneta Finol (President); Enrique Finol Wardrop (Vice President); Adolfo Herrera (general manager); Andrés Finol Wardrop; Alicia Finol Wardrop; José Ramón Muchacho (director); Mervis Salgueiro (chief of information); July Peña (coordinator of information); Lendy Bermúdez (director of marketing).
- Launch date: June 17, 1998
- Official website: Zuliana de Televisión

Zuliana de Televisión (known as Zuliana TV or ZUTV for short), is a Venezuelan regional television station seen by those living the western Venezuelan state of Zulia. It broadcasts on UHF channel 30.

== History ==
ZUTV was inaugurated on June 17, 1991 at precisely six o'clock in the morning. It originally was on the air twelve hours a day and offered a diverse range of programs with the support of Televen and their investors. ZUTV became the 13th regional television station to be created in Venezuela and the first station in Venezuela to broadcast with UHF. They originally covered the area west of Lake Maracaibo (about half of the state). Today they cover the entire state and have their very own television studio. Since their establishment, have had a partnership with local newspaper El Regional del Zulia and the radio station América 95.5 FM.

The signal of ZUTV was connected to that of Televen's by means of the satellite Intelsat 6 which meant the station could easily receive and broadcast Televen's signal and vice versa. It should be mentioned that Televen was the first national television station in the history of Venezuela to broadcast live a regional channel's signal.

ZUTV now produces its own programming and they claim to be neutral in their political views.

== Trivia ==
- ZUTV's installations has always been located in Ciudad Ojeda, in the Lagunillas municipality which is located on the eastern coast of Lake Maracaibo.
- The original station board of directors included people such as Carlos Gonzalez Mazzei (president), Andrés Finol Wardrop (vice president), and Adolfo Herrera (general manager).
- ZUTV has, from the beginning, depended on some of their information from sources such as the AP (Associated Press), Venpres, and Reuters.

== See also ==
- List of Venezuelan television channels
