= TV Familia =

- Type: Cable and Broadcast Television Network
- Branding: TV Familia
- Country: Venezuela
- Availability: National
- Launch date: 2000
- Official website: TV Familia
- Language: Spanish

TV Familia is a Caracas based regional familiar, entertainment, religious (Roman Catholic) and cultural television network. It can be seen by those only living in greater Caracas on UHF channel 69. It can also be seen on Directv channel 117, Net Uno (8), Intercable (79) in Caracas, Guarenas, Guatire, and the Vargas State, and Sistemcable (4).

== See also ==
- List of Venezuelan television channels
