= Mérida Province (1622–1676) =

Administrative division of the Spanish Empire (1622-76); part of present-day Venezuela

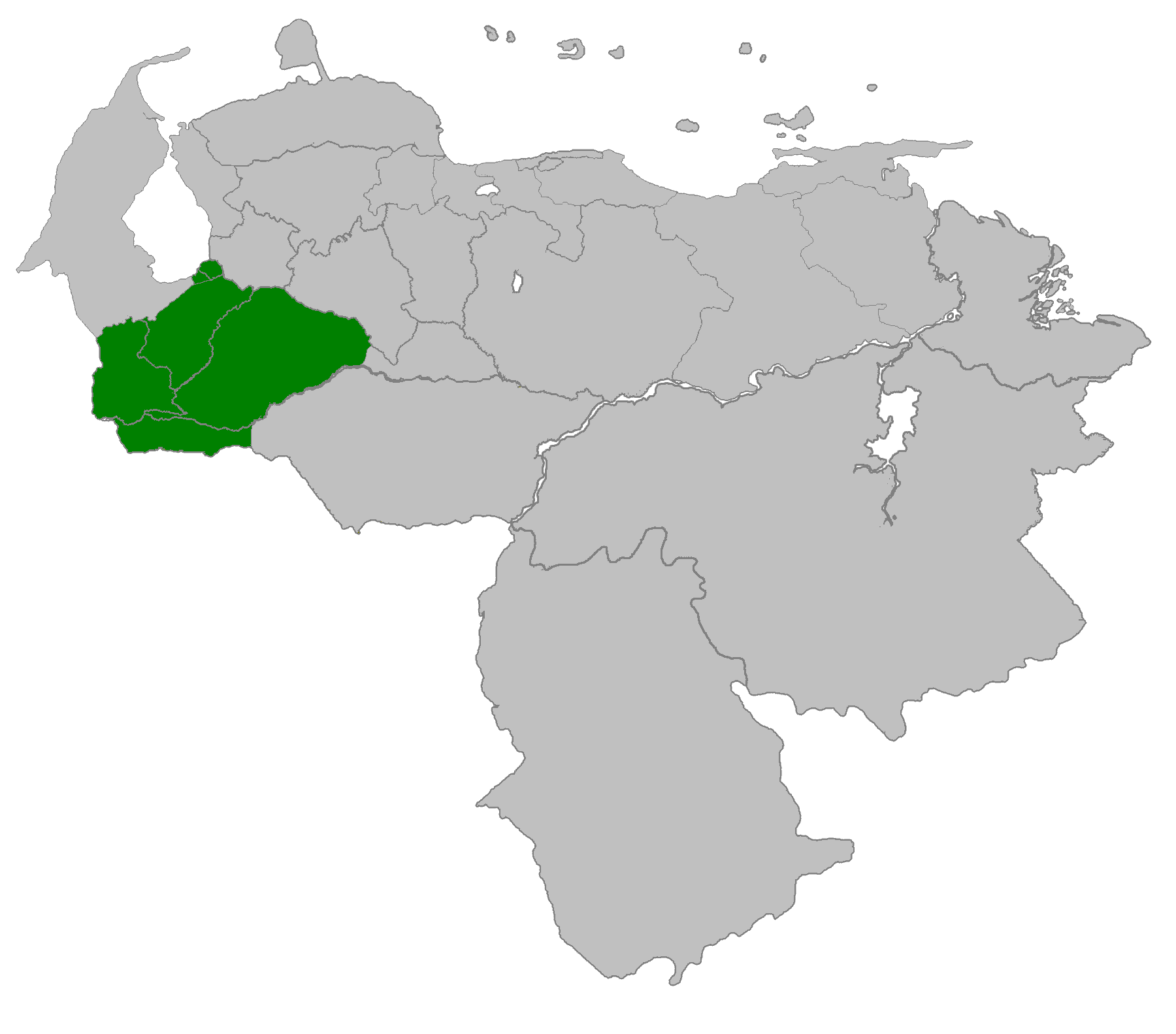
Province of Mérida

Mérida Province was a province of the Spanish Empire in the 17th century (1622–1676), with Mérida as its capital. It was part of the New Kingdom of Granada, and was formed initially in 1607 with a merger with the La Grita Province, forming an administrative unit below province status (Corregimiento de Mérida y La Grita), which it attained in 1622. In 1676 it merged with Maracaibo to form what became known as Maracaibo Province.
