= Jaureguina TV =

Venezuelan TV channel

- Type: Terrestrial television network
- Country: Venezuela
- Availability: La Grita, Jauregui Municipality, Táchira State (UHF channel 66)
- Owner: Jaureguina TV (a community foundation)
- Key people: Jesús Avendaño, legal representative
- Launch date: September 2004

Jaureguina TV is a community television channel in Venezuela. It can be seen in the community of La Grita in the Jauregui Municipality of the Venezuelan state of Táchira. Created in September 2004, Jaureguina TV began broadcasting on UHF channel 66 in 2010. Jesús Avendaño is the legal representative of the foundation that owns the channel.

Jaureguina TV promotes itself as being an "inclusive communication tool" that allows the people to challenge the opinions of state media. Jaureguina TV does not have a website.

== See also ==
- List of television networks in Venezuela
