= Envases Venezolanos =

Envases Venezolanos S.A.
- Company type: Public
- Traded as: BVC: VZL.A
- Industry: Packaging
- Founded: 1952
- Headquarters: Caracas, Venezuela
- Key people: Gustavo Roosen (Chairman); Tomas Roosen (CEO)
- Products: Tinning; Glass
- Revenue: ▲ Bs. 149.5 million (2008)
- Number of employees: 1,361
- Website: Link

Envases Venezolanos (BVC: VZL.A) is a holding company producer and marketer of tinplate cans and lids, as well as glass products for industrial and domestic use. The company produces tin plates and lids used by food processing companies and manufactures of drinks. It also produces tin plates and lids for companies that specialize in the production of paints, solvents and asphalt products and other industries.
