= BBVA Provincial =

Venezuelan bank

BBVA Banco Provincial S.A.

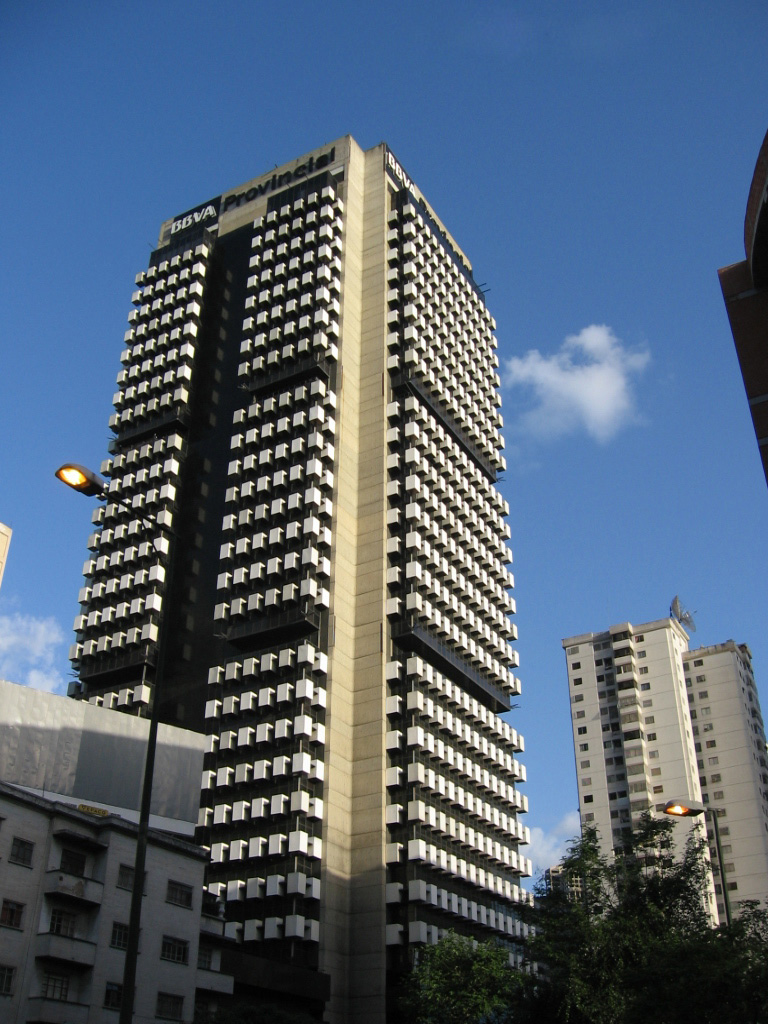
- Banco Provincial Building Headquarters in Caracas.
- Type: Public
- Traded as: BVC: BPV
- Industry: Financial services
- Founded: 1953
- Headquarters: Caracas, Venezuela
- Key people: Leon Henrique Cottin (Chairman); Pedro Rodríguez Serrano (CEO)
- Products: Finance and Insurance
- Revenue: ▲ Bs. 58.42 billion (2025)
- Net income: ▲ Bs. 37.65 billion (2025)
- Total assets: ▲ Bs. 303.65 billion (2025)
- Total equity: ▲ Bs. 122.55 billion (2025)
- Number of employees: 1,907 (2025)
- Parent: BBVA
- Website: www.provincial.com

BBVA Provincial, formerly BBVA Banco Provincial, is a financial institution in Venezuela.

== History ==
Founded on October 15, 1953, in Caracas, Venezuela, as Banco Provincial with a capital of Bs. 15,000,000. In November 1996, Banco Provincial became the first universal bank in Venezuela by expanding its business objectives to include activities of specialized banking.

In 1997, Spain's Banco Bilbao Vizcaya (now Banco Bilbao Vizcaya Argentaria) acquired the majority of shares as a strategy of expansion into Latin America. BBVA's entry in Venezuela coincided with Hugo Chávez's presidential election.

Once Nicolás Maduro came to power in Venezuela, the bank's benefits dropped from €369 million in 2013 to −€13 million in 2017. While Banco Santander exited Venezuela in 2009, BBVA chose to maintain theirs despite the economic crisis.

== Presidents ==
- Ramón Ricardo Ball (1953–1958)
- Captain (Ret.) Remigio Elías Pérez (1958–1993)
- José María Nogueroles (1993–1997)
- León Henrique Cottin (2005–present)

Since 1997, following the integration of Banco Provincial into BBVA, the following have served as Executive President:

- Juan Carlos Zorrilla (1997–2001)
- José Carlos Pla (2001–2005)
- José Antonio Colomer (2005–2007)
- Pedro Rodríguez Serrano (2008–2018)
- José Agustín Antón (2018–2023)
- Fernando Alonso (2023–present), as Country Manager
