= TV Llano =

Venezuelan television station

TV Llano logo

TV Llano is a Venezuelan regional television station that can be seen in the Guárico State on UHF channel 25. It began airing on March 25, 1995.

TV Llano's studios are located in the city of San Juan de los Morros which is the capital of the Guarico State, in central Venezuela. Their transmitting stations are located on the hills: "El Avendado" and "Platillon". The one located on "Platillon" has a height of about 2,000 meters.
