= Flamingo Televisión =

Former regional TV station in Venezuela

- Type: Broadcast Television Network
- Branding: Flamingo
- Country: Venezuela
- Availability: Falcón State
- Launch date: 1990
- Dissolved: 2000
- Official website: Flamingo Televisión

Flamingo Televisión was a Venezuelan regional television station that can be seen on channel 10 in the towns of Boca de Aroa, Tucacas, Ciudad Flamingo, Chichiriviche, and San Juan de los Cayos in the Falcón State. Programs currently seen on Flamingo Televisión include: De Todo Un Poco, Noticiero (news), Controversia, Conexion Informativa, Tips Talentos, Intervideos, El Mundo de la Suerte, Buenos Dias Flamingo, Navegando Por Morrocoy, and Carricitos.
