= Ondas del Lago Televisión =

Venezuelan television station

Ondas del Lago Televisión was a Venezuelan regional television network based in Maracaibo, Zulia State. The network was created in 1957 and lasted only a few months before ceasing operations.

== History ==
The company that owned Ondas del Lago Televisión operated a radio station, known as Ondas del Lago, which was founded on October 10, 1936. On October 1, 1957, Ondas del Lago Televisión, founded by Nicolás Vale Quintero, went on the air. It was equipped with RCA technology, it counted on the first transmitters and other artifacts that could receive and emit color images in the country. Ondas del Lago Televisión disappeared a short time later due to economic problems.

== See also ==
- List of Venezuelan over-the-air television networks and stations
