= Puma TV =

Former Venezuelan TV channel

- Country: Venezuela
- Transmitters: Caracas (channel 57) and Maracaibo (channel 53)

Ownership
- Key people: Eduardo Caballero Ardila (Executive President); Alejandro Parisca, (Vice president); Jorge Morales Divo, (Production Manager)

History
- Launched: 1995 (as Bravo TV)
- Founder: José Luis Rodríguez González
- Closed: October 5, 2007
- Replaced by: Canal i
- Former names: Bravo TV

Puma TV (originally known as Bravo TV) was a privately owned over-the-air television network based in Caracas, Venezuela that featured music videos by artists from all over the world and entertainment related news. On October 5, 2007, Puma TV was taken off the air and replaced by Canal i, a 24-hour news channel.

== History ==
Puma TV was founded as Bravo TV by singer and actor José Luis Rodríguez González (also known as "El Puma") in 1995. Shortly after it went on the air, Bravo TV's name was changed to Puma TV because the name already belonged to a Canadian cable television network.

In 1998, the network raised the amount of original productions from 16 to 20 and expanded their over-the-air coverage to all of Venezuela. Due to economic problem, towards the end of its existence, Puma TV was only seen over-the-air in the cities of Caracas and Maracaibo.

After the 2002-2003 Venezuelan general strike, Puma TV suffered a severe economic crisis that resulted in a 60-day shut down in mid-2003. This measure obligated Puma TV's investors to put the network up for sale, which resulted in its purchase by the Unión Radio Group (a corporation which also controlled the radio stations Éxitos, Onda La Mega Estación, Unión Radio Noticias, and Unión Radio Deportes). The following year, Puma TV was purchased by a group of businessmen with the goal of using the transmitters for a 24-hour news channel in order to compete with Globovisión. After much delay, Canal i (the proposed 24-hour news channel) went on the air on October 5, 2007, thus ending Puma TV's history.

== Programming ==
The following is a list of the final shows that were produced and aired by and on Puma TV:

- El Estirón en Pijamas
- Cine Tips
- Sicilia Desechable 2.0
- Acceso Total
- Mega VJ
- 1/2 Hora Nacional
- El Estirón
- Fashion Nights TV
- EPK
- Equilibrio
- La Removida
- Kronos
- Rapzona
- El Mal Hermano
- Top Videos
- Infrarojo

== See also ==
- Canal i
- List of Venezuelan television channels
