= Bailadores =

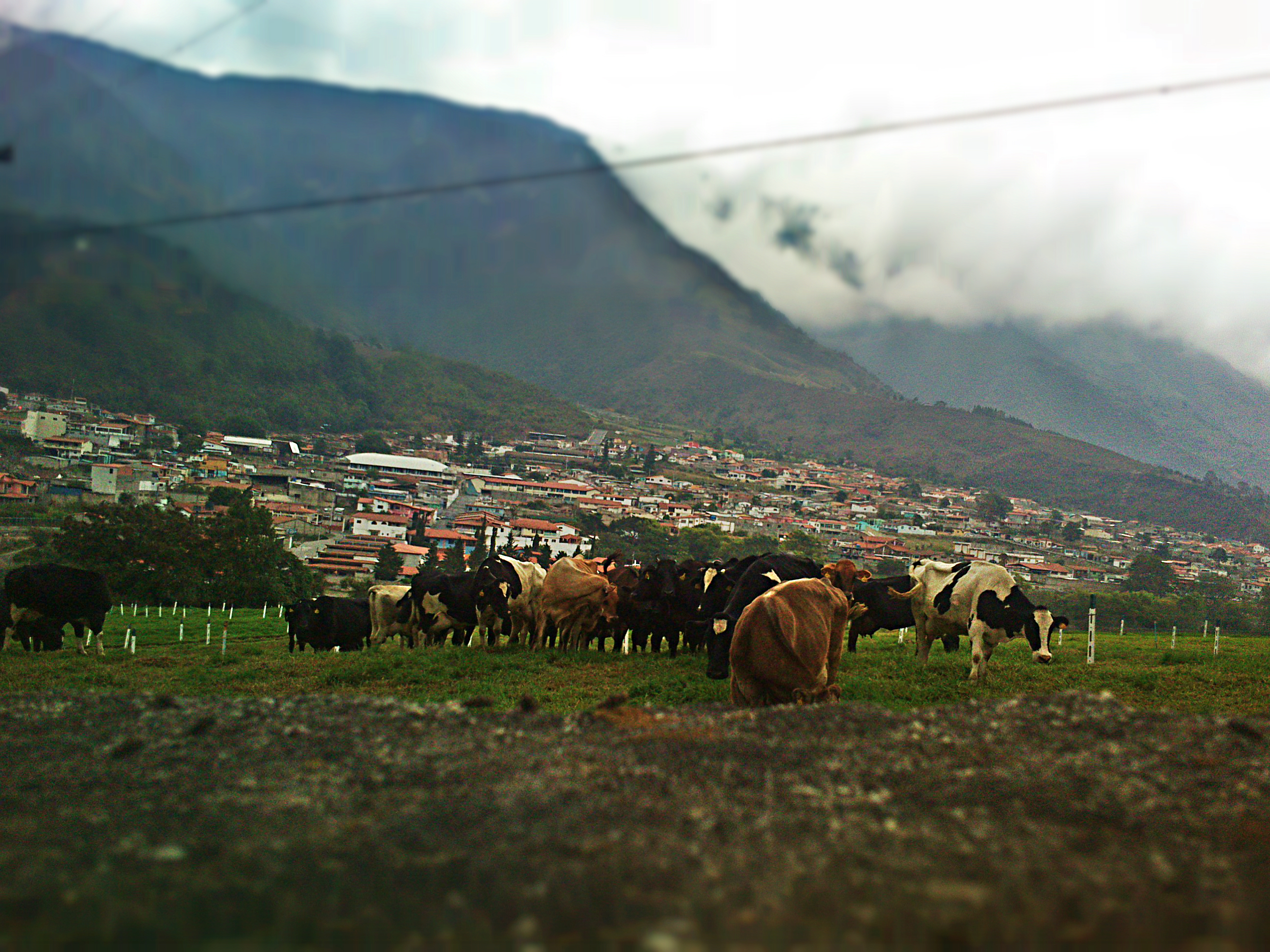
- View of Bailadores

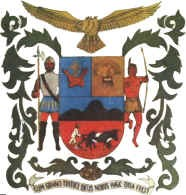
- Flag Coat of arms

- Location within Venezuela
- Coordinates: 8°36′N 71°9′W
- Country: Venezuela
- States: State, Mérida
- Municipalities: Rivas Dávila Municipality
- Founded: 14 September 1601

Government
  - Mayor: Carla Pérez

Area
  - Total: 187 km^{2} (72 sq mi)
- Elevation: 1,630 m (5,350 ft)

Population (2011)
  - Total: 16,841
  - Density: 673.64/km^{2} (1,744.7/sq mi)
  - Demonym: Bailadoreño(a)
- Time zone: UTC-4:30 (VST)
  - Summer (DST): UTC-4:30 (not observed)
- Postal code: 5133
- Area code: 275
- Website: https://www.merida.gob.ve/

Bailadores is a town in the western part of the Mérida State of Venezuela and is the capital of the Rivas Dávila Municipality.

== History ==
It was founded by Captain Luis Martín Martín, September 14, 1601, by appointment of founder Peter Sandes Court, from the Real Audiencia de Santa Fe de Bogotá.

== Notable people ==
- Guillermo Davila, actor and singer

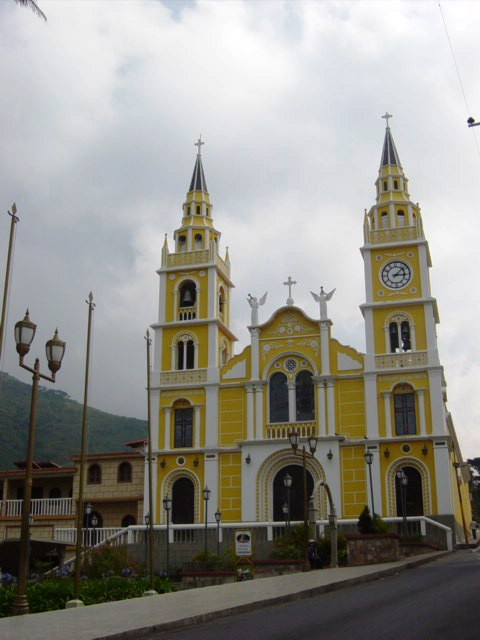
Bailadores Church
