= TVS (Venezuela) =

- Type: Broadcast Television Network
- Country: Venezuela
- Availability: Aragua State and Carabobo State
- Owner: Empresas Sindoni
- Key people: Alicia Sindoni, President of TVS
- Launch date: March, 1994
- Official website: TVS

Televisora Sindoni or TVS is a Venezuelan regional television network based in the city of Maracay, Aragua State. It was launched in 1994 by the businessmen Filippo Sindoni.

== See also ==
- List of Venezuelan television channels
