= Arzobispo Chacón Municipality =

Arzobispo Chacón Municipality Municipio Arzobispo Chacón
- Municipality
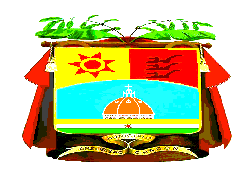
- Flag Coat of arms

- Location in Mérida

- Location in Venezuela
- Coordinates: 8°07′50″N 71°27′41″W
- Country: Venezuela
- State: Mérida
- Municipal seat: Canaguá[*]

Government
  - Mayor: Gustavo Sosa

Area
  - Total: 1,659 km^{2} (641 sq mi)

Population (2007)
  - Total: 15,850
  - Density: 9.554/km^{2} (24.74/sq mi)
- Time zone: UTC−4 (VET)
- Area code(s): 0275
- Website: Official website

The Arzobispo Chacón Municipality is one of the 23 municipalities (municipios) that makes up the Venezuelan state of Mérida and, according to a 2007 population estimate by the National Institute of Statistics of Venezuela, the municipality has a population of 15,850. The town of Canaguá is the shire town of the Arzobispo Chacón Municipality.

== Demographics ==
The Arzobispo Chacón Municipality, according to a 2007 population estimate by the National Institute of Statistics of Venezuela, has a population of 15,850 (up from 15,586 in 2000). This amounts to 1.9% of the state's population. The municipality's population density is 9.4 inhabitants per square kilometre (24/sq mi).

== Government ==
The mayor of the Arzobispo Chacón Municipality is Carlos Andrès Chacòn Mora, elected on October 31, 2004, with 61% of the vote. He replaced Gerardo Duran shortly after the elections. The municipality is divided into seven parishes; Capital Arzobispo Chacón, Capurí, Chacantá, El Molino, Guaimaral, Mucutuy, and Mucuchachí.

== See also ==
- Canaguá
- Mérida
- Municipalities of Venezuela
