= La Grita =

City in Venezuela

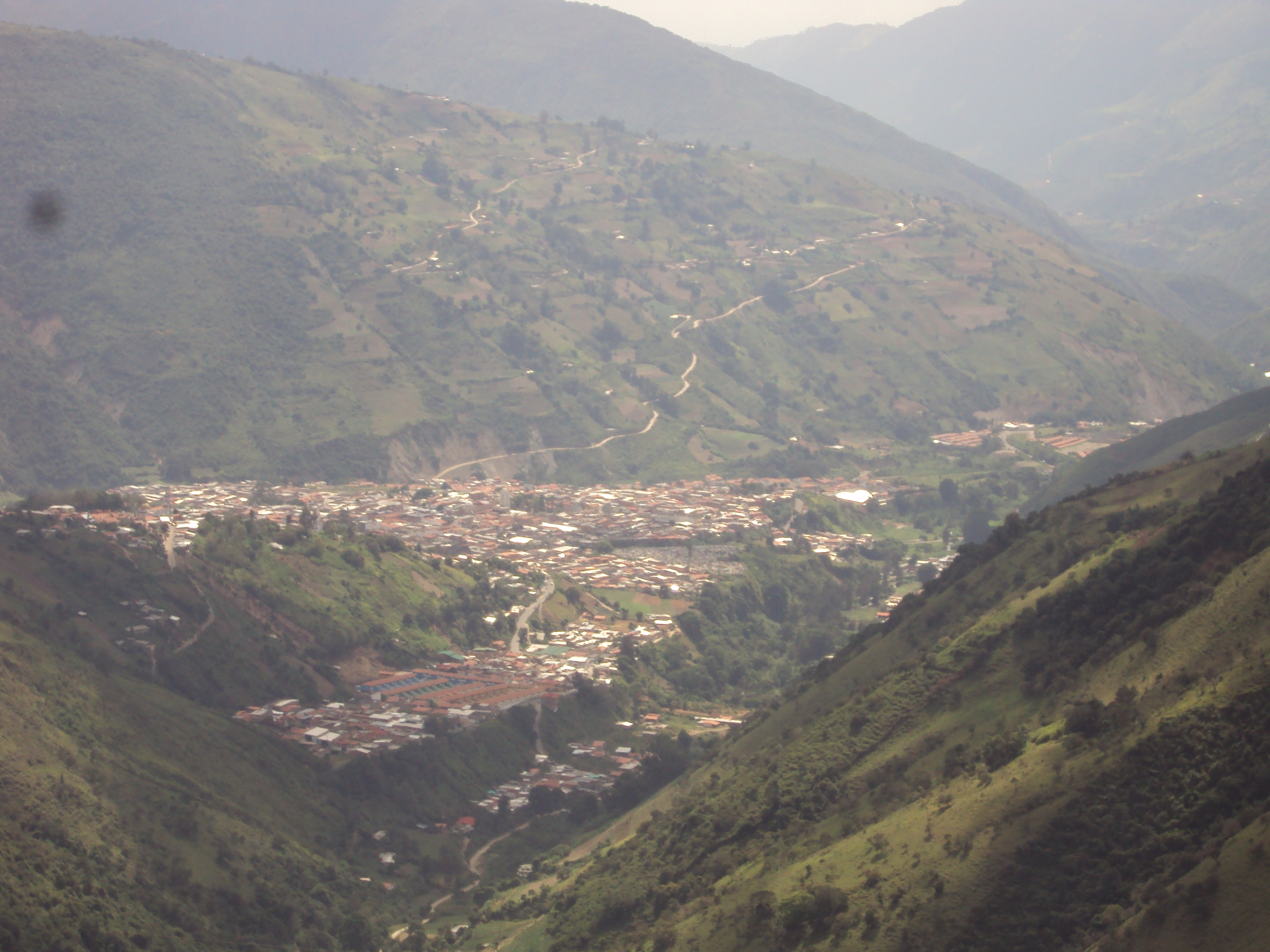

- Flag Coat of arms
- Nickname: Atenas Del Táchira
- Location within Venezuela
- Coordinates: 8°08′N 71°59′W
- Country: Venezuela
- State: Táchira
- Municipality: Jáuregui Municipality
- Founded: 2 November 1576
- Elevation: 1,440 m (4,720 ft)

Population (2011)
  - Total: 90,000
  - Demonym: Gritense
- Time zone: UTC−4 (VST)
- Postal code: 5001
- Area code: 0277
- Climate: Aw

La Grita is a town in the north west of Táchira state, Venezuela. It has a population of 80,000. Located in an Andean valley, La Grita has a beautiful natural setting and fertile land. The town includes colonial style houses and open plazas. The area offers visitors activities including hiking, camping, mountain climbing, as well as flora and fauna observation. Religious tourism is a main attraction during Semana Santa or during the celebration of the Santo Cristo de La Grita every 6 August.

== History ==
Founded by the Spanish Captain Francisco de Cáceres, in 1576, also known as Ciudad de Atenas or Ciudad del Espíritu Santo, it was the capital of the Province of La Grita (1576–1607). Later, the town was a strategic point in Simon Bolivar's "Admirable Campaign" (1813). Bolivar stayed at the "Balcony House", now known as a site of great value to Venezuela's independence movement.

La Grita was affected by the 1875 Cúcuta earthquake.

== Culture ==
La Grita has a community TV station, Jaureguina TV.
