= Promar TV =

Venezuelan television station

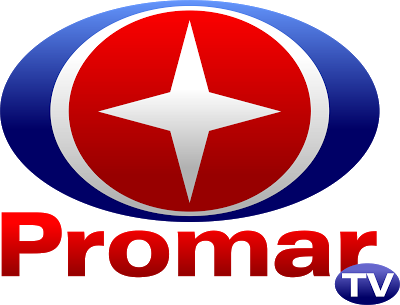
- Barquisimeto, Lara; Venezuela
- Channels: Analog: 27 (UHF)

Programming
- Language: Spanish

Ownership
- Owner: Producciones Mariano C.A.

History
- First air date: November 20, 1995

Links
- Website: https://www.promar.tv/

Promar TV is a Venezuelan regional television station that can be seen in the Lara, Barinas, Portuguesa, and Yaracuy states.

== History ==
Promar TV was created in the Lara State as an independent television production company called Mariano & Co. towards the end of the year 1949. Its founders were Mariano Kossowski and his brother Andrés Kossowski.

The first production by Mariano & Co. was a newscast, which began airing at the end of the year 1950 and was seen in clubs, schools, and on a large screen located in the parking lot of the local Sears. This was the very first newscast that was made in the interior of the country. El noticiero Lara remained on the air until 1953, when it was shut down by the local municipal council because they considered it to be an unfair competitor to the local movie theaters.

In that same year (1953), television appeared in Venezuela. "El noticiero Lara" was developed into a correspondence for the national television station, Radio Caracas Televisión. By then Mariano Co. had their offices located in Barquisimeto, but they would later open offices throughout most of the country.

In the 1960s, Mariano Co. began to make its own televised program known as "Actualidades", whose main objectives was to educate people who were living in the capital of Venezuela on Lara's culture. Actualidades stopped being produced in 1975 when its time slot was given to El Observador's midday broadcast. Mariano Co. had excellent contracts to produce other programs such as "Venezuela Vibra", "Dimensión Humana", and "Alerta" to name a few.

After several decades of producing shows for other television stations, Mariano Co. decided to create its own television station.

Promar TV, as it is known today, first went on the air in November 1995, broadcasting from Barquisimeto. Today, Promar TV is on the air 24 hours a day.
