= Televisora de Oriente =

TV channel in Venezuela

Televisora de Oriente (TVO)
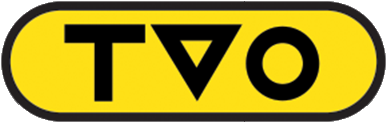
- Type: Free-to-air television network
- Country: Venezuela
- Broadcast area: Anzoategui; Monagas; Sucre; Nueva Esparta

Programming
- Language: Spanish
- Picture format: 480i SDTV

Ownership
- Owner: Grupo Trust Mediatico
- Key people: Pascual Cirigliano, legal representative

History
- Launched: 1992; 34 years ago

Links
- Website: https://www.tvotv.tv/

Televisora de Oriente, or TVO, is a Venezuelan private television channel founded in 1992. The station are located in Puerto La Cruz and the signal can be seen in the Venezuelan states of Anzoátegui (channels 5 and 13), Monagas (channel 32), Nueva Esparta (channel 8), and Sucre (channel 8). Some people in the Miranda and Guárico states can also pick up the signal of TVO. It began broadcasting in 1992.

== History ==
TVO started broadcasting in 1992 from offices in Puerto La Cruz and Maturín.

The channel is owned by Corporación Catatumbo of the state company PDVSA, which also owns Catatumbo Televisión in Maracaibo. It is operated by Grupo Trust Mediático through Vepaco TV in Caracas since October 2015, to form together with Catatumbo as a television network to share programming.

On October 13, 2015, Televisora de Oriente rebranded.
