= Michelena =

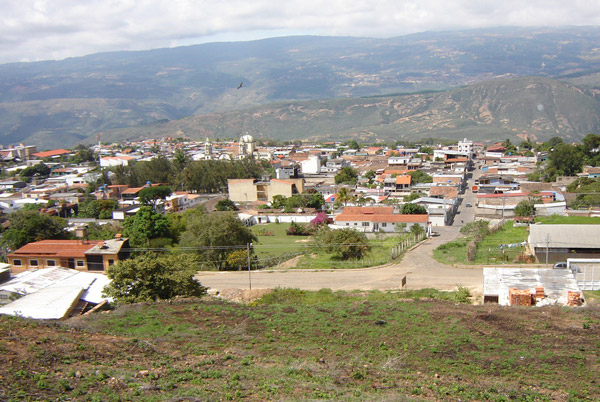
- Michelena from Los Guamos

- Flag Coat of arms
- Nickname: Corazón del Táchira
- Location within Venezuela
- Coordinates: 7°58′N 72°14′W
- Country: Venezuela
- State: Táchira
- Municipality: Michelena Municipality
- Founded: 4 March 1849
- Elevation: 1,200 m (3,900 ft)
- Time zone: UTC−4 (VET)
- Postal code: 5037
- Area code: 0277
- Climate: Aw
- Website: Municipal website

Michelena is a town in Táchira state, Venezuela. It was founded in 1849 by José Amando Pérez. It had a population of 14,759 in 2011.

== Notable people ==
- Ilich Ramírez Sánchez, also known as Carlos the Jackal, currently serving life sentence in France for killing three people, was born here.
- Marcos Pérez Jiménez, a former president of Venezuela, was born there.
- Francisco Antonio Zambrano, an educator and instructor of minors held in the police headquarters of the state of Táchira. He was vice president of the municipal council of Michelena from 1974 to 1977, creator of the slogan "Michelena Corazón del Táchira" in 1974.
- Gaby Arellano, a former student leader of the University of Los Andes and the March 13 Movement, deputy to the National Assembly of Venezuela (2015-2020), leader of the Will party and the National Resistance against the governments of Hugo Chávez, Nicolás Maduro and Diosdado Cabello.
