= La Tele =

Venezuelan regional television channel

- Type: Broadcast television network
- Country: Venezuela

Ownership
- Key people: Fernando Fraiz Trapote, founder

History
- Launched: December 1, 2002; 22 years ago
- Founder: Fernando Fraiz
- Closed: June 1, 2015; 10 years ago
- Former names: Canal 12

Links
- Website: http://www.latele.com.ve/

La Tele was a regional television network in Venezuela. It could be seen on the cable and satellite systems of DirecTV (channel 113 in all of Venezuela), Supercable (channels 49, 48, 49, 49, 48, and 44 in Caracas, Margarita Island, Maracay, Puerto Ordaz, Puerto la Cruz, and Maturín, respectively), Intercable (channel five in Caracas), and Net Uno (channel 68 in Caracas).

== History ==
La Tele was created by a group of communication companies and began its testing phase under the name Canal 12 on December 1, 2002 (which coincidentally happened to be the day before the beginning of the Venezuelan general strike against President Hugo Chávez). The channel 12 signal was previously used by the defunct Marte TV. La Tele was officially inaugurated on August 3, 2003 at 8pm. Originally, eighty percent of La Tele's programming were imports. La Tele's slogan is Soy la Tele (I am La Tele), but it has also used the slogans Somos La Tele (We Are La Tele) and Señal de Cambio (Signal of Change).
