= Televisora Regional del Táchira =

Televisora Regional del Táchira (TRT)
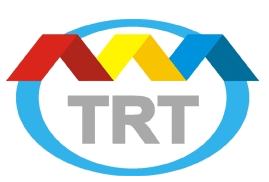
- Type: Broadcast television network
- Country: Venezuela
- Broadcast area: Táchira, southern Zulia, northeastern Barinas, northern Apure

Programming
- Language: Spanish
- Picture format: 480i SDTV

Ownership
- Owner: José Avendaño

History
- Launched: October 15, 1989; 36 years ago

Links
- Website: TRT

Availability

Terrestrial
- Analog VHF: Channel 6 (San Cristóbal)

Televisora Regional del Táchira (TRT) is a privately owned Venezuelan regional television network based in the city of San Cristóbal in Táchira. Including Táchira, TRT can be seen in the southern part of the Zulia, northeastern Barinas, and northern Apure in Venezuela. Its signal can also be seen in Colombia in the Norte de Santander Department and northern Arauca Department. It broadcasts on channel six.

== History ==
In early 1983, a group of businessmen from Táchira came up with the idea to establish a television network in Táchira with the purpose of promoting the region’s culture. Later, other businessmen from other areas in Venezuela became involved.

The company Televisora Regional del Táchira, S.A., was established in March 1984, and on February 17, 1988, the company received a broadcast license from the Venezuelan Ministry of Transportation and Communications (Ministerio de Transporte y Comunicaciones). In early 1989, the construction of the transmitting station located on a hill named "Gallinero" in Palmira, Guásimos municipality, was completed. This transmitting station enabled TRT to finally go on the air. TRT's signal reaches most of Táchira, parts of Apure, parts of Zulia, the northern part of the Arauca Department in Colombia, and some parts of the Norte de Santander Department in Colombia.

On July 24, 1989, TRT began testing their signal on channel six. Its test signal consisted of a color test pattern and the network's music. On October 15, 1989, at 8pm, a soccer (football) game was broadcast from the Polideportivo de Pueblo Nuevo stadium in the city of San Cristóbal. It was on Friday, November 24, 1989, that the inaugural ball was celebrated in San Cristóbal’s opera house (important Venezuelan personalities came to this ball, including president Carlos Andrés Pérez). This was when TRT began its regular programming.

With the need to improve their coverage, another transmitting station (called "El Rayo", located in the municipality of Pedro María Ureña in Táchira), was constructed, and finally became functional on March 25, 1994. This new transmitting station completely covered the Norte de Santander Department in Colombia, the southern part of Zulia, the Zamora municipality in Barinas, the Páez Municipality in Apure, and improved its signal in Táchira.

The host of the program "Café con Azócar", Gustavo Azócar, was arrested on 6 March 2006 by the metropolitan police of Táchira after a complaint filed by ex-prosecutor Ana Casanova in the year 2000 over alleged irregularities in the broadcast of advertisements for the state lottery on Radio de San Cristóbal (now known as 1060 AM), where Azócar worked as a general coordinator.

On 20 November 2007, National Assembly deputy Iris Varela, upon leaving the studios of TRT after an interview earlier that morning, had an encounter with Gustavo Azócar, where she hit him several times before finally leaving. Varela, in a telephone interview with Globovisión, claimed that her fight with Azócar was provoked because Azócar used slander against her and made a hurtful statement about her dead son.

As of 2019, TRT had 13 in-house productions on air.

== See also ==
- List of Venezuelan over-the-air television networks and stations
