= Índice Bursátil de Capitalización =

Venezuelan stock market index

Índice Bursátil de Capitalización (IBC), also known as the General Index, is the main and most important index of Caracas Stock Exchange. It lists the 11 largest companies by capitalization and liquidity of the Venezuelan Stock Market.

The index is calculated from 28 August 1997.

== History ==
When the index was launched on 28 August 1997, it comprised 15 companies: Cantv, Fondo de Valores Inmobiliarios, H.L. Boulton, Corimon, Manpa, Mercantil Servicios Financieros, Electricidad de Caracas, Banco Provincial, Venepal, Mantex, Sudamtex, Sivensa, Vencemos, Mavesa, and Banco Venezolano de Crédito.

Mavesa is now a subsidiary of Empresas Polar. The Uruguayan-owned textile company Sudamtex closed down. Venepal declared bankruptcy in 2004, and was subsequently nationalised, becoming "invepal". Cement company Vencemos, taken over by the Mexican Cemex in 1994, was nationalised in 2008, becoming Cementos Venezuela.

Inflation in Venezuela has caused the value of the index to be adjusted five times since 2014, all involving dividing the index by 1000: on 2 January 2014, on 9 October 2017, on 6 November 2018, on 22 March 2021, and on 28 July 2025.

== Annual returns ==
The following table shows the annual development of the General Index since 2001.

Year	Closing level	Change in Index in Points	Change in Index in %
2000	6.67		
2001	6.57	−0.10	−1.50
2002	8.02	1.45	22.07
2003	22.20	14.18	176.81
2004	29.95	7.75	34.91
2005	20.39	-9.56	-31.92
2006	52.23	31.84	156.15
2007	37.90	−14.33	−27.44
2008	35.09	−2.81	−7.41
2009	55.08	19.99	56.97
2010	65.34	10.26	18.63
2011	117.04	51.70	79.12
2012	471.44	354.40	302.80
2013	2,736.58	2,265.14	480.47
2014	3,858.74	1,122.16	41.01
2015	14,588.25	10,729.51	278.06
2016	31,705.22	17,116.97	117.33
2017	1,263.14	−30,442.10	−96.02
2018	1,605.26	342.12	27.08
