= Boulton (surname) =

Boulton is an English surname. Notable people with the surname include:

== A ==
- Adam Boulton (born 1959), British journalist, Editor-at-large of Sky News
- Alfredo Boulton (1908–1995), Venezuelan photographer, founder of Boulton Foundation
- Andres Boulton Pietri (1909–1994), Venezuelan entrepreneur of Venezuelan Boulton Group
- Andres Boulton (born 1943), Venezuelan writer and philosopher

== B ==
- Bolivia Bottome Boulton (born 1960), Venezuelan musicologist

== C ==
- Charles Arkoll Boulton (1841–1899), British lieutenant colonel in the Red River Rebellion
- Clint Boulton (1948–2021), English footballer

== D ==
- Doris Boulton-Maude born Doris Boulton (1892–1961), Englısh artist

== E ==
- Eduardo Schlageter Boulton (1940–2003), Venezuelan entrepreneur of Venezuelan Boulton Group
- Eric Boulton (born 1976), British ice hockey player
- Ernest Boulton (1847–1904), British actor accused in the Boulton and Park transvestism trial

== H ==
- Henry Lord Boulton Schimmel (1829–1891), Venezuelan entrepreneur of Venezuelan Boulton Group
- Henry Lord Boulton Nuñes (1920–2015), Venezuelan entrepreneur of Venezuelan Boulton Group
- Howard Boulton Nuñes (born 1936), Venezuelan entrepreneur of Venezuelan Boulton Group

== I ==
- Isaac Watt Boulton (1823–1899), British engineer, owned a locomotive-hire business known as Boulton's Siding

== J ==
- John Boulton Rojas (1870–1940), Venezuelan entrepreneur of Venezuelan Boulton Group
- John Boulton Townley (1805–1875), British entrepreneur founder of Venezuelan Boulton Group

== L ==
- Laura Boulton (1899–1980), American ethnomusicologist

== M ==
- Maria Teresa Boulton (born 1956), Venezuelan photographer
- Margarita Boulton (born 1978), Venezuelan photographer
- Margot Boulton (1907–2003), Venezuelan philanthropist
- Marjorie Boulton (1924–2017), British writer
- Matthew Boulton (1728–1809), British manufacturer and business partner of James Watt
- Matthew Piers Watt Boulton (1820–1894), British classicist, amateur scientist and inventor
- Matthew Robinson Boulton (1770–1842), British manufacturer and son of Matthew Boulton

== P ==
- Percy Boulton (1898–?), British aviator

== R ==
- Ralph Boulton (1923–1992), English footballer
- Richard Boulton Winckelmann (born 1964), Venezuelan entrepreneur of Venezuelan Boulton Group
- Roger Boulton Almeida (born 1937), Venezuelan entrepreneur of Venezuelan Boulton Group
- Roland Denis Boulton (born 1960), Venezuelan economist

== V ==
- Vanessa Boulton (born 1979), Venezuelan designer

== W ==
- William Savage Boulton (1867–1954), English geologist
