= List of Lehigh Valley Phantoms players =

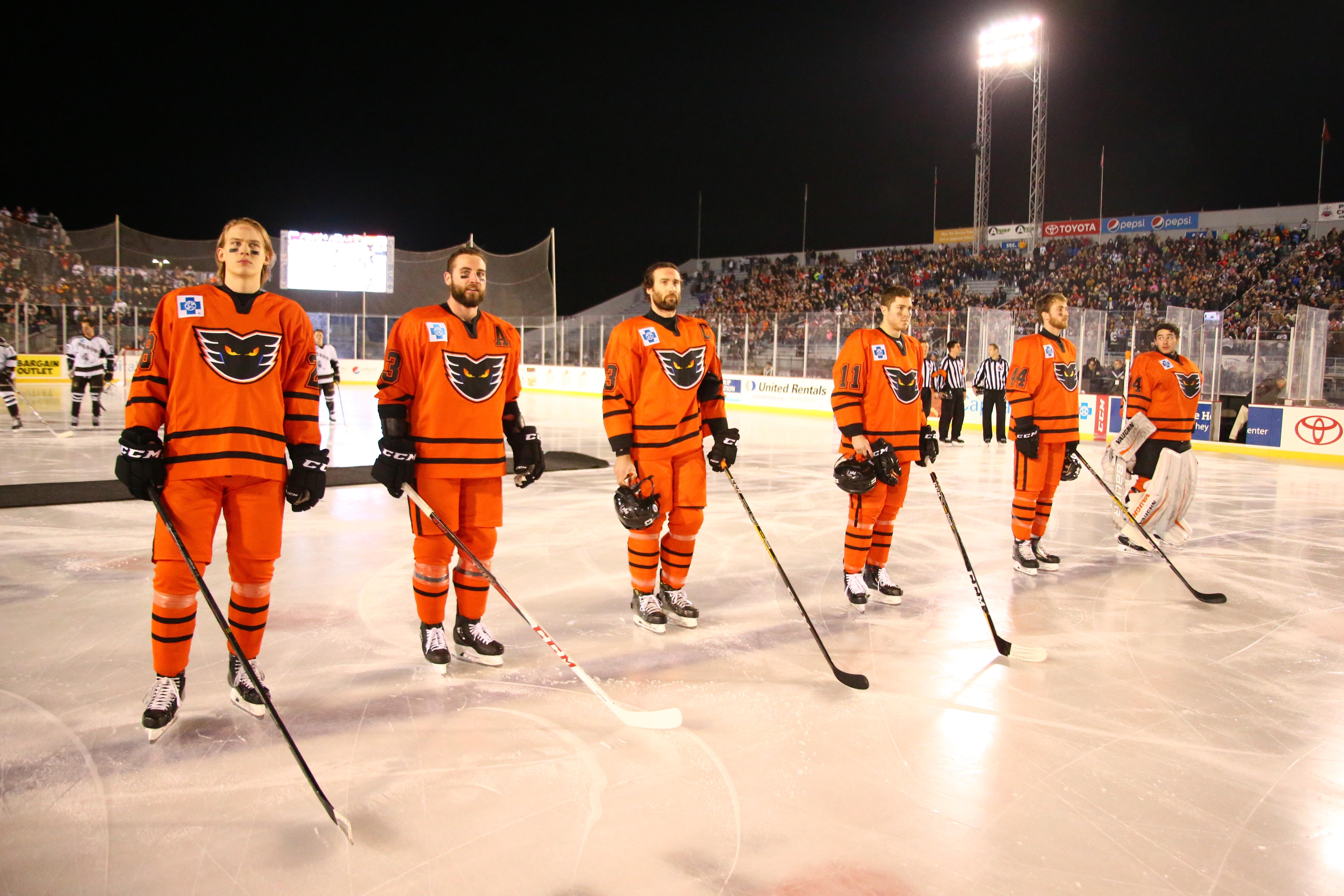
Lehigh Valley Phantoms players lined up on the blue line prior to the 2018 AHL Outdoor Classic in January 2018

The Lehigh Valley Phantoms are a professional ice hockey team based in Allentown, Pennsylvania. They are members of the Atlantic Division of the American Hockey League's (AHL) Eastern Conference. They have been the primary minor league affiliate of the Philadelphia Flyers of the National Hockey League (NHL) since their inception.

The Phantoms were founded as the Philadelphia Phantoms in 1996 and primarily played their home games at the Spectrum in Philadelphia, Pennsylvania through the 2008–09 season. They moved to Glens Falls, New York and became the Adirondack Phantoms, playing the next five seasons at the Glens Falls Civic Center. Beginning with the 2014–15 season, the Phantoms moved to Allentown to become the Lehigh Valley Phantoms and currently play at the PPL Center.

As of the completion of the 2025–26 AHL season, 31 goaltenders and 219 skaters (forwards and defensemen) have appeared in at least one regular season and/or playoff game with the Lehigh Valley Phantoms since the team moved to Allentown. The 250 all-time members of the Lehigh Valley Phantoms are listed below, with statistics complete through the end of the 2025–26 season.

== Key ==
- ‡ Appeared in a Phantoms game during the most recently completed season

General abbreviations
Abbreviation	Definition
GP	Games played

Goaltender statistical abbreviations
Abbreviation	Definition
W	Wins
L	Losses
OTL	Overtime loss
SO	Shutouts
GAA	Goals against average
SV%	Save percentage

Skater statistical abbreviations
Abbreviation	Definition
Pos	Position
G	Goals
A	Assists
P	Points
PIM	Penalty minutes
D	Defense
F	Forward
LW	Left wing
C	Center
RW	Right wing

Statistics are complete to the end of the 2025–26 AHL season.

== Goaltenders ==
Goaltenders who have played for the Lehigh Valley Phantoms
Name	Nat^{[a]}	Seasons^{[b]}	Regular season							Playoffs					
Name	Nat^{[a]}	Seasons^{[b]}	GP	W	L	OTL	SO	GAA	SV%	GP	W	L	SO	GAA	SV%
Jean-Francois Berube	(Canada)	2019–2020	29	12	11	4	3	2.56	.906	–	–	–	–	–	–
Carson Bjarnason‡	(Canada)	2025–2026	32	14	11	4	0	3.43	.877	–	–	–	–	–	–
Mark Dekanich	(Croatia)	2016–2017	1	0	0	0	0	9.10	.839	–	–	–	–	–	–
Brian Elliott	(Canada)	2018–2019	2	1	1	0	0	3.47	.877	–	–	–	–	–	–
Samuel Ersson	(Sweden)	2021–2023	47	24	20	2	1	2.85	.899	3	1	2	0	3.71	.875
Parker Gahagen	(United States)	2023–2025	40	19	12	6	1	2.48	.917	5	3	1	0	2.00	.929
Jon Gillies	(United States)	2021–2022	1	0	1	0	0	2.05	.895	–	–	–	–	–	–
Troy Grosenick	(United States)	2022–2023	6	3	2	0	0	3.32	.892	–	–	–	–	–	–
Carter Hart	(Canada)	2018–2019	18	9	6	2	1	3.05	.902	–	–	–	–	–	–
Connor Knapp	(United States)	2015–2016	2	1	0	0	0	5.31	.821	–	–	–	–	–	–
Aleksei Kolosov‡	(Belarus)	2023–2026	52	21	28	3	2	3.02	.892	–	–	–	–	–	–
Branden Komm	(United States)	2018–2019	4	1	2	0	0	3.28	.901	–	–	–	–	–	–
Jason LaBarbera	(Canada)	2015–2016	23	7	14	0	1	3.02	.899	–	–	–	–	–	–
Alex Lyon	(United States)	2016–2021	149	75	54	15	6	2.75	.913	13	6	6	0	1.99	.940
Nolan Maier	(Canada)	2022–2024	10	6	2	2	0	2.66	.896	1	0	0	0	4.90	.818
Eetu Makiniemi	(Finland)	2024–2025	5	3	0	1	0	3.03	.899	–	–	–	–	–	–
Zane McIntyre	(United States)	2020–2021	19	11	3	3	1	2.33	.917	–	–	–	–	–	–
Mike McKenna	(United States)	2018–2019	10	5	4	0	0	3.61	.896	–	–	–	–	–	–
Garrett Metcalf	(United States)	2021–2022	4	2	1	1	0	3.48	.882	–	–	–	–	–	–
John Muse	(United States)	2017–2018	15	11	2	1	1	2.46	.919	–	–	–	–	–	–
Pat Nagle	(United States)	2021–2023	31	11	13	10	2	3.06	.895	–	–	–	–	–	–
Michal Neuvirth	(Czech Republic)	2018–2019	1	1	0	0	0	3.00	.912	–	–	–	–	–	–
Martin Ouellette	(Canada)	2014–2017	21	11	5	0	2	2.30	.927	4	2	2	0	2.20	.920
Yaniv Perets‡	(Canada)	2025–2026	5	2	3	0	1	2.71	.905	–	–	–	–	–	–
Cal Petersen	(United States)	2023–2025	59	23	30	6	2	2.93	.893	9	4	5	1	3.01	.872
Keith Petruzzelli	(United States)	2024–2025	6	3	3	0	0	3.21	.887	–	–	–	–	–	–
Felix Sandstrom	(Sweden)	2018–2024	88	39	29	15	2	2.95	.899	–	–	–	–	–	–
Anthony Stolarz	(United States)	2014–2019	113	50	41	13	3	2.93	.910	–	–	–	–	–	–
Dustin Tokarski	(Canada)	2017–2018	39	20	8	7	5	2.65	.915	3	1	1	0	4.17	.859
Kirill Ustimenko	(Belarus)	2019–2020; 2021–2022	13	2	6	5	0	3.33	.895	–	–	–	–	–	–
Rob Zepp	(Germany)	2014–2015	47	21	20	4	0	2.68	.917	–	–	–	–	–	–

== Skaters ==
Skaters who have played for the Lehigh Valley Phantoms
Name	Nat^{[a]}	Pos	Seasons^{[b]}	Regular season					Playoffs					Notes
Name	Nat^{[a]}	Pos	Seasons^{[b]}	GP	G	A	P	PIM	GP	G	A	P	PIM	Notes
Rodrigo Abols	(Latvia)	C	2024–2025	47	15	17	32	12	7	2	0	2	0	
Jason Akeson	(Canada)	RW	2014–2015	57	23	30	53	25	–	–	–	–	–	
Brandon Alderson	(Canada)	RW	2014–2016	53	3	5	8	65	–	–	–	–	–	
Wade Allison	(Canada)	RW	2020–2022; 2023–2024	84	24	19	43	57	–	–	–	–	–	
Mark Alt	(United States)	D	2014–2018	179	12	38	50	82	5	0	0	0	2	
Emil Andrae‡	(Sweden)	D	2022–2026	103	10	49	59	99	16	2	7	9	12	
Andy Andreoff	(Canada)	LW	2019–2021	42	13	7	20	42	–	–	–	–	–	Co-captain: 2019–2020
Artem Anisimov	(Russia)	C	2022–2023	55	19	17	36	2	3	1	1	2	0	
Ronnie Attard	(United States)	D	2022–2025	123	22	37	59	97	9	1	2	3	14	
Nicolas Aube-Kubel	(Canada)	RW	2015–2020	229	50	55	105	236	14	0	0	0	8	
J.R. Avon	(Canada)	C	2023–2025	125	16	19	35	31	3	0	0	0	12	
Justin Bailey	(United States)	RW	2018–2019	17	6	2	8	12	–	–	–	–	–	
Cole Bardreau	(United States)	RW	2014–2019	226	41	57	98	238	18	0	3	3	38	
Denver Barkey‡	(Canada)	LW	2025–2026	26	7	9	16	20	–	–	–	–	–	
Evan Barratt	(United States)	LW	2022–2023	2	0	1	1	2	–	–	–	–	–	
Jordy Bellerive	(Canada)	C	2022–2024	89	11	13	24	95	3	0	0	0	12	
Kieffer Bellows	(United States)	LW	2022–2023	12	3	7	10	16	–	–	–	–	–	
Louie Belpedio	(United States)	D	2022–2025	174	17	48	65	224	15	0	6	6	41	
Carter Berger‡	(Canada)	D	2025–2026	12	0	3	3	4	–	–	–	–	–	
Jack Berglund‡	(Sweden)	C	2025–2026	5	1	0	1	13	–	–	–	–	–	
Xavier Bernard	(Canada)	D	2024–2025	25	0	3	3	21	–	–	–	–	–	
Chris Bigras	(Canada)	D	2019–2021	60	4	20	24	30	–	–	–	–	–	
Oliver Bonk‡	(Canada)	D	2025–2026	46	6	13	19	22	–	–	–	–	–	
Sawyer Boulton‡	(United States)	F	2024–2026	34	1	1	2	91	–	–	–	–	–	
Jacques Bouquot	(United States)	C	2023–2024	1	0	0	0	0	–	–	–	–	–	
Darren Brady	(United States)	D	2023–2024	2	0	1	1	2	–	–	–	–	–	
T. J. Brennan	(United States)	D	2016–2020	230	44	112	156	284	18	2	8	10	16	
Tim Brent	(Canada)	C	2015–2016	52	10	18	28	39	–	–	–	–	–	
Bobby Brink	(United States)	RW	2022–2024	54	19	22	41	17	9	0	5	5	6	
Adam Brooks	(Canada)	C	2022–2024	101	23	37	60	43	9	2	4	6	2	
Matt Brown	(United States)	F	2023–2025	19	0	2	2	2	–	–	–	–	–	
Alex Bump‡	(United States)	LW	2024–2026	38	12	17	29	22	7	2	0	2	2	
Connor Bunnaman	(Canada)	C	2018–2022	147	32	22	54	50	–	–	–	–	–	
Greg Carey	(Canada)	LW	2016–2020	277	103	92	195	116	18	5	5	10	16	
Gianfranco Cassaro	(Canada)	D	2024–2025	1	0	0	0	0	–	–	–	–	–	
Jackson Cates	(United States)	C	2021–2023	102	13	20	33	20	1	0	0	0	0	
Alex Ciernik	(Slovakia)	LW	2024–2025	3	0	1	1	0	–	–	–	–	–	
Adam Clendening	(United States)	D	2021–2022	74	5	37	42	78	–	–	–	–	–	
Adam Comrie	(Canada)	D	2014–2016; 2017–2018	82	15	21	36	73	–	–	–	–	–	
Kevin Connauton	(Canada)	D	2022–2023	63	3	12	15	49	3	0	0	0	0	
Chris Conner	(United States)	RW	2015–2019	265	71	128	199	62	18	6	7	13	2	
Nick Cousins	(Canada)	C	2014–2016	102	34	60	94	118	–	–	–	–	–	
Kyle Criscuolo	(United States)	C	2019–2020	40	8	16	24	14	–	–	–	–	–	
Ralph Cuddemi	(Canada)	F	2020–2021	8	1	1	2	0	–	–	–	–	–	
Alexis D'Aoust	(Canada)	RW	2021–2022	6	0	0	0	0	–	–	–	–	–	
Logan Day	(United States)	D	2020–2022	95	7	26	33	38	–	–	–	–	–	
James de Haas	(Canada)	D	2017–2020	112	4	24	28	50	2	0	0	0	2	
Steven Delisle	(Canada)	D	2014–2015	62	2	13	15	133	–	–	–	–	–	
Phil DeSimone	(United States)	C	2015–2016	28	5	8	13	26	–	–	–	–	–	
Elliot Desnoyers	(Canada)	LW	2022–2025	187	34	51	85	66	11	1	1	2	6	
Karsen Dorwart‡	(United States)	LW	2025–2026	70	10	14	24	18	–	–	–	–	–	
David Drake	(United States)	D	2017–2020	9	0	2	2	4	1	0	0	0	2	
Davis Drewiske	(United States)	D	2015–2016	73	5	9	14	16	–	–	–	–	–	
Jackson Edward‡	(Canada)	D	2025–2026	7	1	3	4	20	–	–	–	–	–	
Oscar Eklind‡	(Sweden)	LW	2024–2026	113	14	23	37	52	7	1	0	1	2	
Joel Farabee	(United States)	LW	2019–2020	5	3	1	4	2	–	–	–	–	–	
Radel Fazleev	(Russia)	C	2016–2019	143	10	27	37	50	4	0	2	2	2	
Colin Felix	(United States)	D	2021–2022	1	0	0	0	7	–	–	–	–	–	
Gerry Fitzgerald	(Canada)	F	2019–2020	40	7	4	11	10	–	–	–	–	–	
Ryan Fitzgerald	(United States)	C	2020–2023	45	13	10	23	10	–	–	–	–	–	
Brett Flemming	(Canada)	D	2014–2015	37	0	6	6	39	–	–	–	–	–	
Tyson Foerster	(Canada)	RW	2020–2023	99	32	36	68	79	3	2	1	3	0	
Mark Friedman	(Canada)	D	2016–2020	186	10	51	61	116	13	2	0	2	8	
Byron Froese	(Canada)	C	2018–2019	24	7	7	14	28	–	–	–	–	–	
Morgan Frost	(Canada)	C	2019–2020; 2021–2022	65	19	29	48	28	–	–	–	–	–	
Brendan Furry	(United States)	LW	2022–2025	121	17	23	40	73	9	0	2	2	12	
Austin Fyten	(Canada)	LW	2014–2015	64	2	9	11	85	–	–	–	–	–	
Kurtis Gabriel	(Canada)	RW	2019–2020	53	5	4	9	92	–	–	–	–	–	
Sam Gagner	(Canada)	C	2015–2016	9	1	5	6	4	–	–	–	–	–	
Rhett Gardner	(Canada)	C	2023–2025	122	15	26	41	148	9	2	1	3	16	
Jacob Gaucher‡	(Canada)	C	2023–2026	198	48	42	90	109	13	4	4	8	4	
Alexis Gendron‡	(Switzerland)	RW	2023–2026	127	35	22	57	105	–	–	–	–	–	
Charlie Gerard	(United States)	F	2021–2023	61	6	6	12	22	–	–	–	–	–	
Dennis Gilbert‡	(United States)	D	2025–2026	6	0	1	1	6	–	–	–	–	–	
Adam Ginning‡	(Sweden)	D	2022–2026	237	9	50	59	242	16	0	4	4	14	
Ben Gleason	(United States)	D	2024–2025	29	2	12	14	7	–	–	–	–	–	
Carson Golder‡	(Canada)	LW	2025–2026	9	0	1	1	4	–	–	–	–	–	
Andrew Gordon	(Canada)	RW	2014–2015	76	18	24	42	22	–	–	–	–	–	
Boyd Gordon	(Canada)	C	2016–2017	6	0	0	0	21	–	–	–	–	–	
Shayne Gostisbehere	(United States)	D	2014–2016; 2019–2020	21	2	14	16	6	–	–	–	–	–	
Tyrell Goulbourne	(Canada)	LW	2015–2019	223	25	30	55	313	11	2	0	2	19	
Kevin Goumas	(United States)	LW	2014–2016	121	12	18	30	39	–	–	–	–	–	
Helge Grans‡	(Sweden)	D	2023–2026	183	12	33	45	95	11	1	4	5	4	
Tyler Gratton	(United States)	RW	2023–2024	1	0	0	0	0	–	–	–	–	–	
Nikita Grebenkin	(Russia)	RW	2024–2025	11	3	4	7	9	7	1	3	4	0	
Carl Grundstrom‡	(Sweden)	RW	2025–2026	19	6	9	15	6	–	–	–	–	–	
Maxence Guenette‡	(Canada)	D	2025–2026	46	2	22	24	19	–	–	–	–	–	
Artem Guryev‡	(Russia)	D	2025–2026	6	0	0	0	4	–	–	–	–	–	
Robert Hagg	(Sweden)	D	2014–2017	192	15	31	46	132	5	0	1	1	0	
Brett Harrison‡	(Canada)	C	2025–2026	12	2	2	4	2	–	–	–	–	–	
Matt Hatch	(United States)	LW	2014–2015	2	0	0	0	0	–	–	–	–	–	
Brett Hextall	(United States)	RW	2014–2015	63	6	8	14	119	–	–	–	–	–	
Hayden Hodgson	(Canada)	RW	2021–2023	90	22	17	39	153	–	–	–	–	–	
Linus Hogberg	(Sweden)	D	2020–2023	103	3	17	20	24	–	–	–	–	–	
Frank Hora	(United States)	D	2017–2019	9	0	0	0	0	–	–	–	–	–	
Mike Huntebrinker	(United States)	F	2018–2019	22	2	0	2	8	–	–	–	–	–	
David Jiricek‡	(Czech Republic)	D	2025–2026	15	2	11	13	13	–	–	–	–	–	
Hunter Johannes‡	(United States)	LW	2025–2026	2	0	0	0	0	–	–	–	–	–	
Adam Johnson	(United States)	C	2021–2022	30	4	8	12	12	–	–	–	–	–	
Andrew Johnston	(Canada)	LW	2014–2015	14	0	1	1	2	–	–	–	–	–	
Blair Jones	(Canada)	C	2014–2015	33	9	12	21	46	–	–	–	–	–	
Devin Kaplan‡	(United States)	RW	2025–2026	49	5	8	13	62	–	–	–	–	–	
Adam Karashik	(United States)	D	2021–2024	58	1	7	8	60	–	–	–	–	–	
David Kase	(Czech Republic)	RW	2018–2021	110	18	33	51	32	–	–	–	–	–	
Boris Katchouk‡	(Canada)	LW	2025–2026	17	6	6	12	14	–	–	–	–	–	
Alex Kile	(United States)	LW	2021–2024	52	6	5	11	30	–	–	–	–	–	
Corban Knight	(Canada)	C	2016–2019	138	29	58	87	66	18	1	4	5	6	
Eric Knodel	(United States)	D	2019–2020	10	0	4	4	0	–	–	–	–	–	
Cole Knuble‡	(United States)	C	2025–2026	7	1	2	3	0	–	–	–	–	–	
Matt Konan	(United States)	D	2014–2015	3	0	0	0	0	–	–	–	–	–	
Alex Krushelnyski	(United States)	F	2017–2019	57	3	8	11	12	10	2	2	4	2	
Christian Kyrou‡	(Canada)	D	2025–2026	55	10	24	34	16	–	–	–	–	–	
Pascal Laberge	(Canada)	C	2017–2021	54	15	5	20	30	–	–	–	–	–	
Tanner Laczynski	(United States)	C	2020–2024	93	31	43	74	28	6	4	0	4	0	
Maxim Lamarche	(Canada)	D	2014–2018	112	7	20	27	91	18	1	2	3	2	
Nick Lappin	(United States)	RW	2021–2022	38	5	3	8	13	–	–	–	–	–	
Matt Lashoff	(United States)	D	2015–2016	17	0	2	2	28	–	–	–	–	–	
Scott Laughton	(Canada)	C	2014–2015; 2016–2017	99	33	33	66	71	5	2	1	3	2	
Oliver Lauridsen	(Denmark)	D	2014–2015	75	4	6	10	152	–	–	–	–	–	
Jori Lehtera	(Finland)	C	2018–2019	5	1	2	3	4	–	–	–	–	–	
Taylor Leier	(Canada)	LW	2014–2017; 2018–2019	226	56	80	136	97	5	1	0	1	2	
Oskar Lindblom	(Sweden)	LW	2015–2016; 2017–2018	62	18	23	41	10	11	4	3	7	0	
Jett Luchanko	(Canada)	C	2024–2025	9	0	3	3	8	7	0	6	6	12	
Nick Luukko	(United States)	D	2014–2015; 2017–2018	7	0	0	0	0	–	–	–	–	–	
Olle Lycksell	(Sweden)	RW	2022–2025	134	52	76	128	34	16	5	9	14	8	
Andrew MacDonald	(Canada)	D	2015–2016	43	5	31	36	30	–	–	–	–	–	
Josh MacDonald	(Canada)	LW	2018–2019	8	0	0	0	0	–	–	–	–	–	
Zack MacEwen	(Canada)	RW	2022–2023	2	1	2	3	0	–	–	–	–	–	
Ryan MacKinnon	(Canada)	D	2021–2022	25	2	1	3	10	–	–	–	–	–	
Tanner MacMaster	(Canada)	LW	2020–2021	21	2	1	3	23	–	–	–	–	–	
Brandon Manning	(Canada)	D	2014–2015	60	11	32	43	150	–	–	–	–	–	
Cooper Marody‡	(United States)	C	2022–2026	162	43	79	122	80	9	1	7	8	4	
Danick Martel	(Canada)	C	2014–2018	199	68	52	120	189	18	5	4	9	26	
Christian Marti	(Switzerland)	D	2015–2016	27	0	1	1	10	–	–	–	–	–	
Nick Master	(United States)	C	2021–2022	1	0	0	0	0	–	–	–	–	–	
Derek Mathers	(Canada)	RW	2014–2016	43	0	2	2	159	–	–	–	–	–	
Gerald Mayhew	(United States)	C	2021–2022	24	9	7	16	20	–	–	–	–	–	
Chris McCarthy	(United States)	C	2016–2018	18	1	2	3	4	–	–	–	–	–	
Colin McDonald	(United States)	RW	2015–2019	248	60	69	129	92	18	3	6	9	4	Captain: 2015–2019
Hunter McDonald‡	(United States)	D	2023–2026	147	4	23	27	203	13	2	0	2	34	
Garrett McFadden	(Canada)	D	2021–2022	4	0	0	0	2	–	–	–	–	–	
Ben Meehan‡	(United States)	D	2025–2026	5	0	0	0	0	–	–	–	–	–	
Brennan Menell	(United States)	D	2021–2022	18	0	6	6	19	–	–	–	–	–	
Victor Mete	(Canada)	D	2023–2024	59	1	15	16	22	4	0	1	1	2	
Rob Michel	(United States)	D	2018–2019	3	0	1	1	0	–	–	–	–	–	
Andy Miele	(United States)	C	2016–2017	65	13	44	57	54	5	1	2	3	4	
Matt Miller	(United States)	F	2023–2025	8	1	0	1	0	2	0	0	0	0	
Mason Millman	(Canada)	D	2020–2024	41	0	8	8	26	–	–	–	–	–	
Samuel Morin	(Canada)	D	2015–2021	177	8	36	44	289	8	0	2	2	4	
Brad Morrison	(Canada)	C	2021–2022	1	0	1	1	0	–	–	–	–	–	
Chris Mueller	(United States)	C	2020–2021	32	6	8	14	8	–	–	–	–	–	
Ty Murchison‡	(United States)	D	2024–2026	33	3	5	8	52	–	–	–	–	–	
Philippe Myers	(Canada)	D	2017–2020	109	14	44	58	136	13	3	4	7	12	
Will O'Neill	(United States)	D	2016–2018	116	9	42	51	58	–	–	–	–	–	
Cal O'Reilly	(Canada)	C	2019–2023	218	36	87	123	48	2	0	0	0	0	Co-captain: 2019–2020; Captain: 2020–2023
Pavel Padakin	(Ukraine)	RW	2015–2016	41	2	7	9	35	–	–	–	–	–	
Zach Palmquist	(United States)	D	2018–2019	66	3	11	14	24	–	–	–	–	–	
Aaron Palushaj	(United States)	RW	2015–2016	57	11	17	28	44	–	–	–	–	–	
Michael Parks	(United States)	F	2015–2016	3	0	1	1	0	–	–	–	–	–	
Lane Pederson‡	(Canada)	C	2025–2026	63	23	25	48	44	–	–	–	–	–	
Jesper Pettersson	(Sweden)	D	2014–2016	75	3	7	10	47	–	–	–	–	–	
Evan Polei	(Canada)	LW	2023–2024	38	2	4	6	36	4	0	0	0	0	
Derrick Pouliot	(Canada)	D	2020–2021	25	3	11	14	20	–	–	–	–	–	
Darroll Powe	(Canada)	C	2014–2015	43	5	9	14	49	–	–	–	–	–	
Noah Powell‡	(United States)	F	2025–2026	16	2	2	4	11	–	–	–	–	–	
Mason Primeau	(Canada)	C	2024–2025	1	0	0	0	2	–	–	–	–	–	
Nate Prosser	(United States)	D	2019–2020	59	1	9	10	47	–	–	–	–	–	Co-captain: 2019–2020
Evan Rankin	(United States)	RW	2015–2016	24	1	6	7	6	–	–	–	–	–	
Isaac Ratcliffe	(Canada)	LW	2017–2018; 2019–2023	162	22	34	56	142	–	–	–	–	–	
Matt Read	(Canada)	RW	2017–2018	33	7	9	16	8	–	–	–	–	–	
Joe Rehkamp	(United States)	F	2015–2016	41	1	2	3	16	–	–	–	–	–	
Cam Reid	(Canada)	F	2015–2016	1	0	0	0	2	–	–	–	–	–	
Anthony Richard‡	(Canada)	C	2024–2026	108	35	46	81	68	7	4	3	7	18	
Will Riedell	(United States)	D	2021–2022	2	0	0	0	0	–	–	–	–	–	
Massimo Rizzo	(Canada)	C	2024–2025	46	6	12	18	10	–	–	–	–	–	
Tucker Robertson‡	(Canada)	C	2025–2026	63	13	15	28	41	–	–	–	–	–	
Jay Rosehill	(Canada)	LW	2014–2016	88	6	9	15	252	–	–	–	–	–	
German Rubtsov	(Russia)	C	2018–2020; 2021–2022	93	10	19	29	20	–	–	–	–	–	
Ethan Samson‡	(Canada)	D	2023–2026	142	15	25	40	100	9	0	0	0	8	
Philip Samuelsson	(United States)	D	2018–2019	67	4	11	15	26	–	–	–	–	–	
Linus Sandin	(Sweden)	RW	2020–2022	62	14	16	30	22	–	–	–	–	–	
Travis Sanheim	(Canada)	D	2015–2018	98	12	44	56	56	12	1	5	6	6	
Brennan Saulnier	(Canada)	C	2020–2022	59	7	6	13	129	–	–	–	–	–	
David Schlemko	(Canada)	D	2018–2019	18	0	4	4	4	–	–	–	–	–	
Roman Schmidt‡	(United States)	D	2025–2026	16	0	0	0	22	–	–	–	–	–	
Sam Sedley	(Canada)	D	2024–2025	2	0	0	0	0	–	–	–	–	–	
Vincent Sevigny‡	(Canada)	D	2025–2026	9	0	0	0	6	–	–	–	–	–	
Dalton Smith	(Canada)	LW	2015–2016	11	1	0	1	25	–	–	–	–	–	
Givani Smith	(Canada)	RW	2024–2025	10	1	1	2	9	7	0	0	0	19	
Chris Stewart	(Canada)	RW	2019–2020	6	1	2	3	0	–	–	–	–	–	
Zack Stortini	(Canada)	RW	2014–2015	76	13	12	25	184	–	–	–	–	–	
Petr Straka	(Czech Republic)	RW	2014–2016	132	33	28	61	51	–	–	–	–	–	
Matthew Strome	(Canada)	LW	2018–2022	91	8	15	23	36	–	–	–	–	–	
Kevin Sundher	(Canada)	C	2015–2016	10	3	2	5	8	–	–	–	–	–	
Maxim Sushko	(Belarus)	RW	2019–2022	125	21	17	38	65	–	–	–	–	–	
Steven Swavely	(United States)	RW	2015–2020	107	7	11	18	18	8	0	0	0	0	
Riley Thompson‡	(Canada)	LW	2025–2026	9	0	4	4	4	–	–	–	–	–	
Philip Tomasino‡	(Canada)	RW	2025–2026	38	7	19	26	28	–	–	–	–	–	
Samu Tuomaala‡	(Finland)	RW	2021–2022; 2023–2026	120	26	49	75	46	–	–	–	–	–	
Carsen Twarynski	(Canada)	LW	2017–2021	107	18	20	38	62	2	0	0	0	0	
Chris VandeVelde	(United States)	C	2014–2015	1	2	0	2	0	–	–	–	–	–	
Phil Varone	(Canada)	C	2017–2019	96	34	64	98	42	7	0	3	3	2	
Mike Vecchione	(United States)	C	2017–2019	132	32	46	78	60	12	3	4	7	2	
Mikhail Vorobyev	(Russia)	C	2017–2020	145	28	55	83	84	9	1	1	2	20	
Jordan Weal	(Canada)	C	2016–2017	43	15	32	47	30	–	–	–	–	–	
Dale Weise	(Canada)	RW	2018–2019	3	1	1	2	2	–	–	–	–	–	
Andy Welinski	(United States)	D	2019–2020	42	8	13	21	10	–	–	–	–	–	
Ryan White	(Canada)	C	2014–2015	11	1	2	3	39	–	–	–	–	–	
Reece Willcox	(Canada)	D	2015–2020	232	12	46	58	81	13	0	1	1	4	
Max Willman	(United States)	LW	2019–2023	142	32	35	67	85	3	0	0	0	0	
Garrett Wilson‡	(Canada)	LW	2020–2026	341	62	86	148	789	16	2	2	4	39	Captain: 2023–present
Zayde Wisdom‡	(Canada)	RW	2020–2021; 2022–2026	260	39	51	90	140	8	3	1	4	14	
Tyler Wotherspoon	(Canada)	D	2019–2021	78	4	24	28	44	–	–	–	–	–	
Wyatte Wylie	(United States)	D	2020–2023	131	9	26	35	51	3	0	0	0	0	
Cam York	(United States)	D	2020–2023	62	7	23	30	20	–	–	–	–	–	
Egor Zamula‡	(Russia)	D	2020–2023; 2025–2026	130	5	51	56	38	–	–	–	–	–	
Cooper Zech	(United States)	D	2021–2022	53	1	10	11	12	–	–	–	–	–	
Mark Zengerle	(United States)	C	2016–2017	69	13	21	34	16	5	1	1	2	2	
Will Zmolek	(United States)	D	2022–2024	9	0	2	2	0	1	0	0	0	0	

== Gallery ==
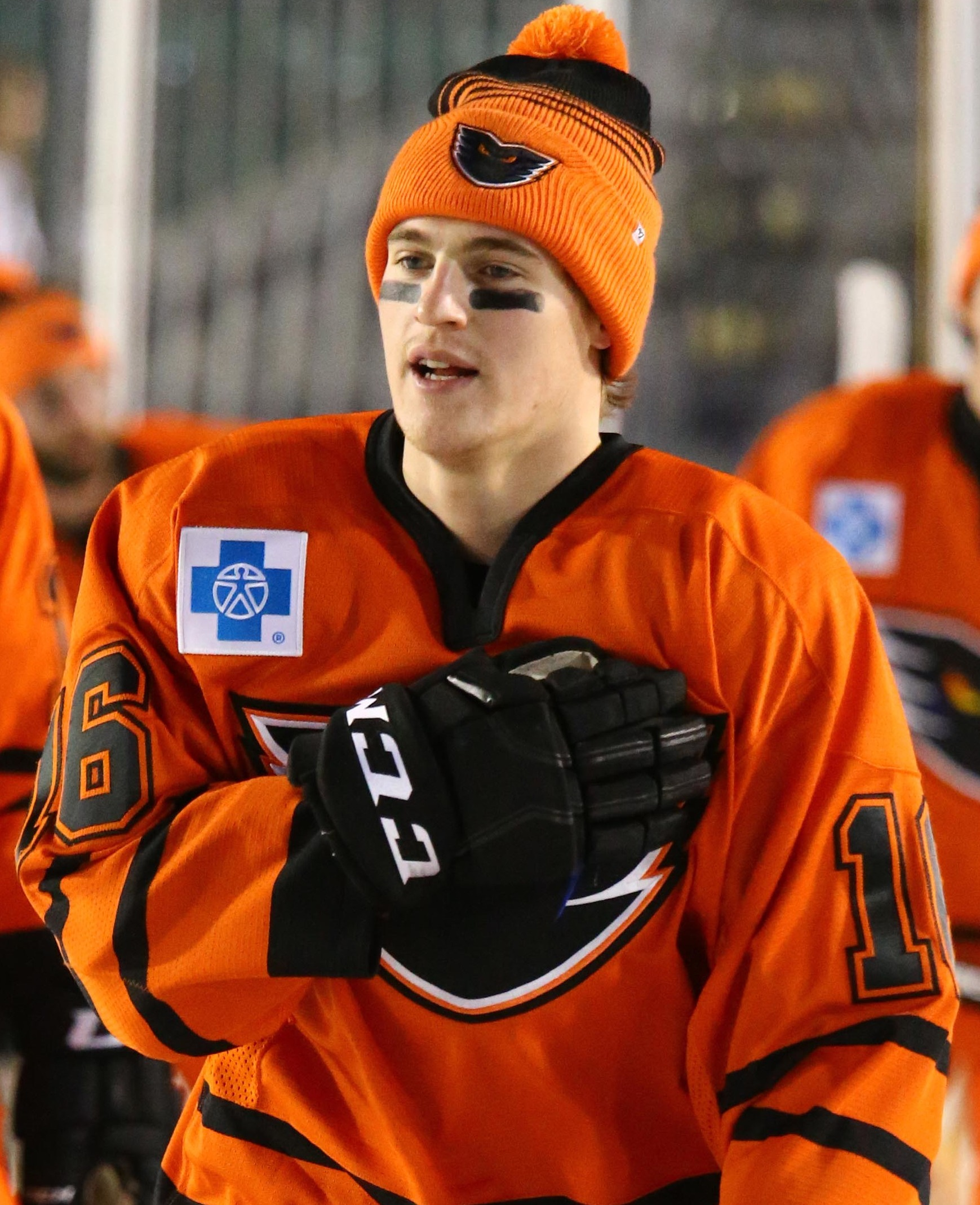
Nicolas Aube-Kubel played five seasons for the Phantoms.

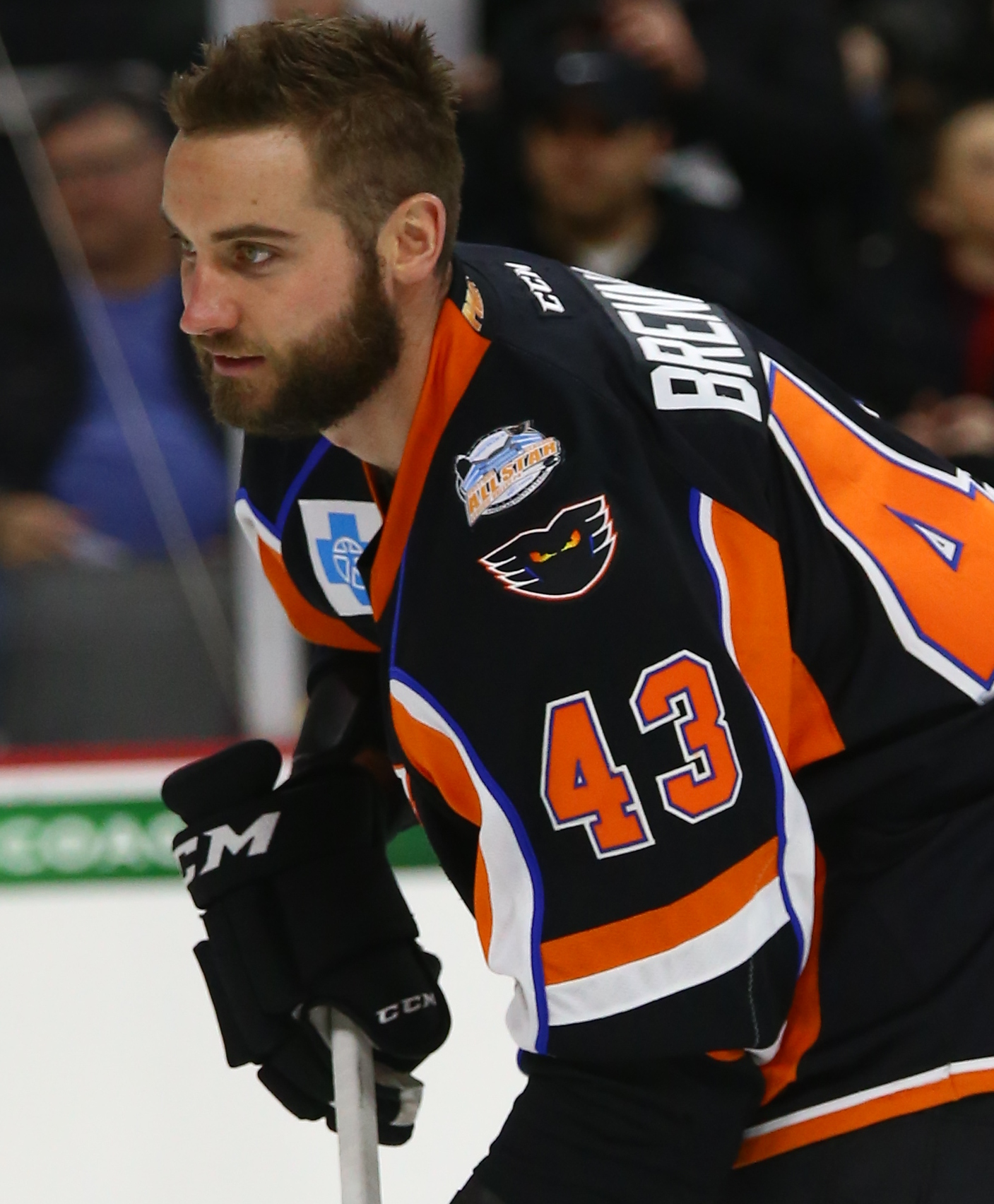
T. J. Brennan played four seasons for the Phantoms.

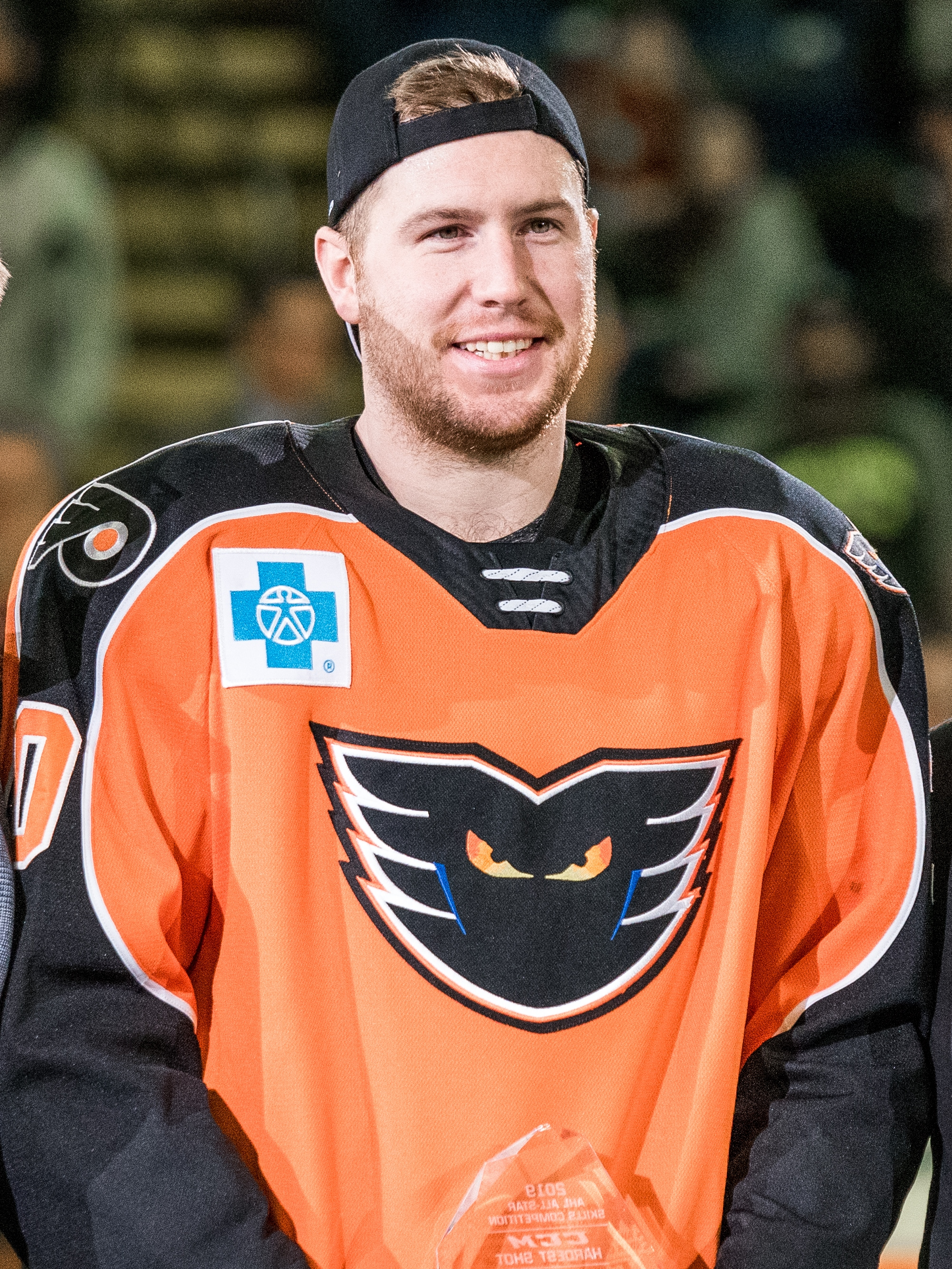
Greg Carey played four seasons for the Phantoms.

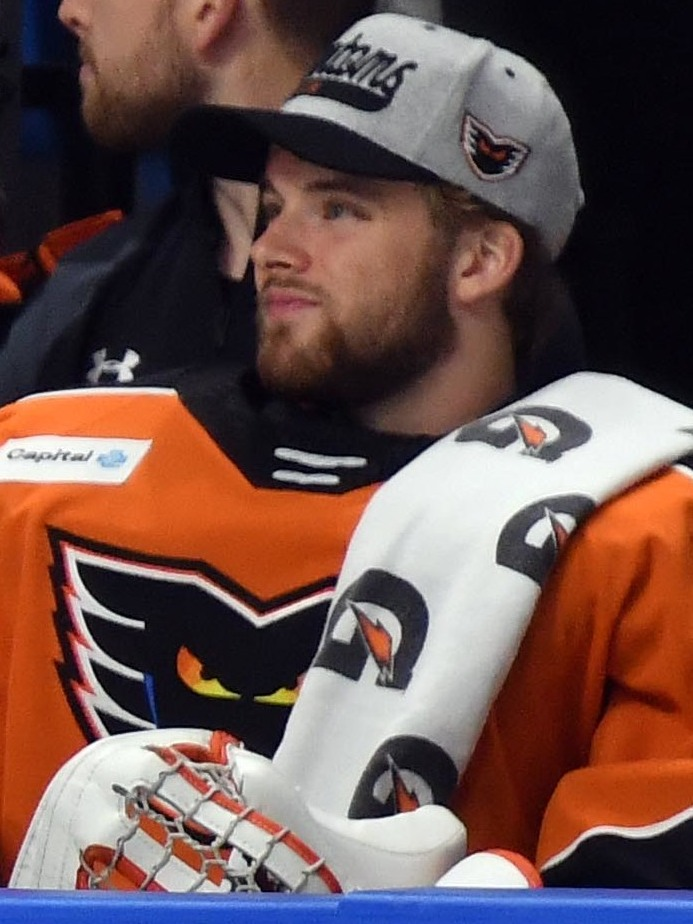
Samuel Ersson played two seasons for the Phantoms.

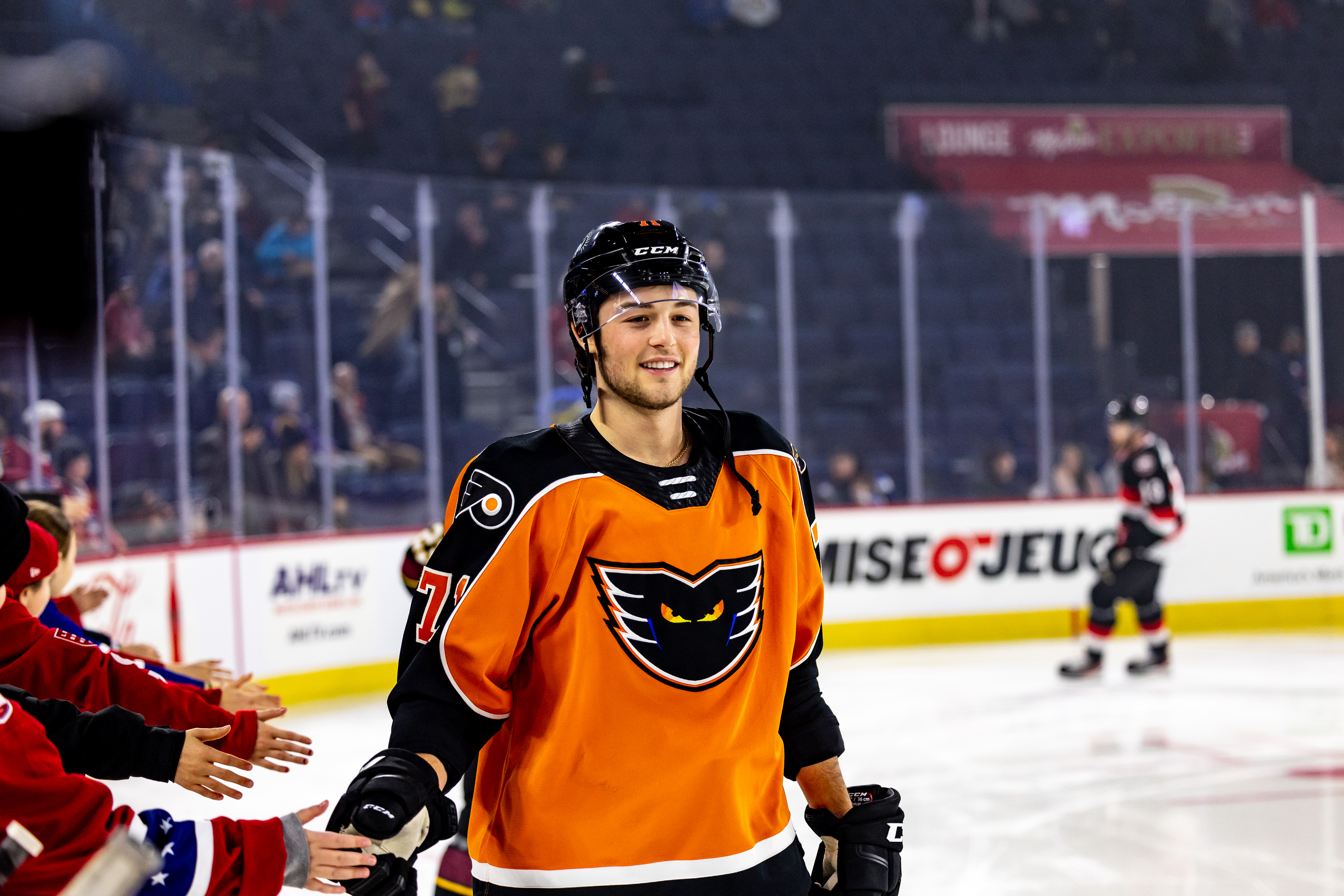
Tyson Foerster played three seasons for the Phantoms.

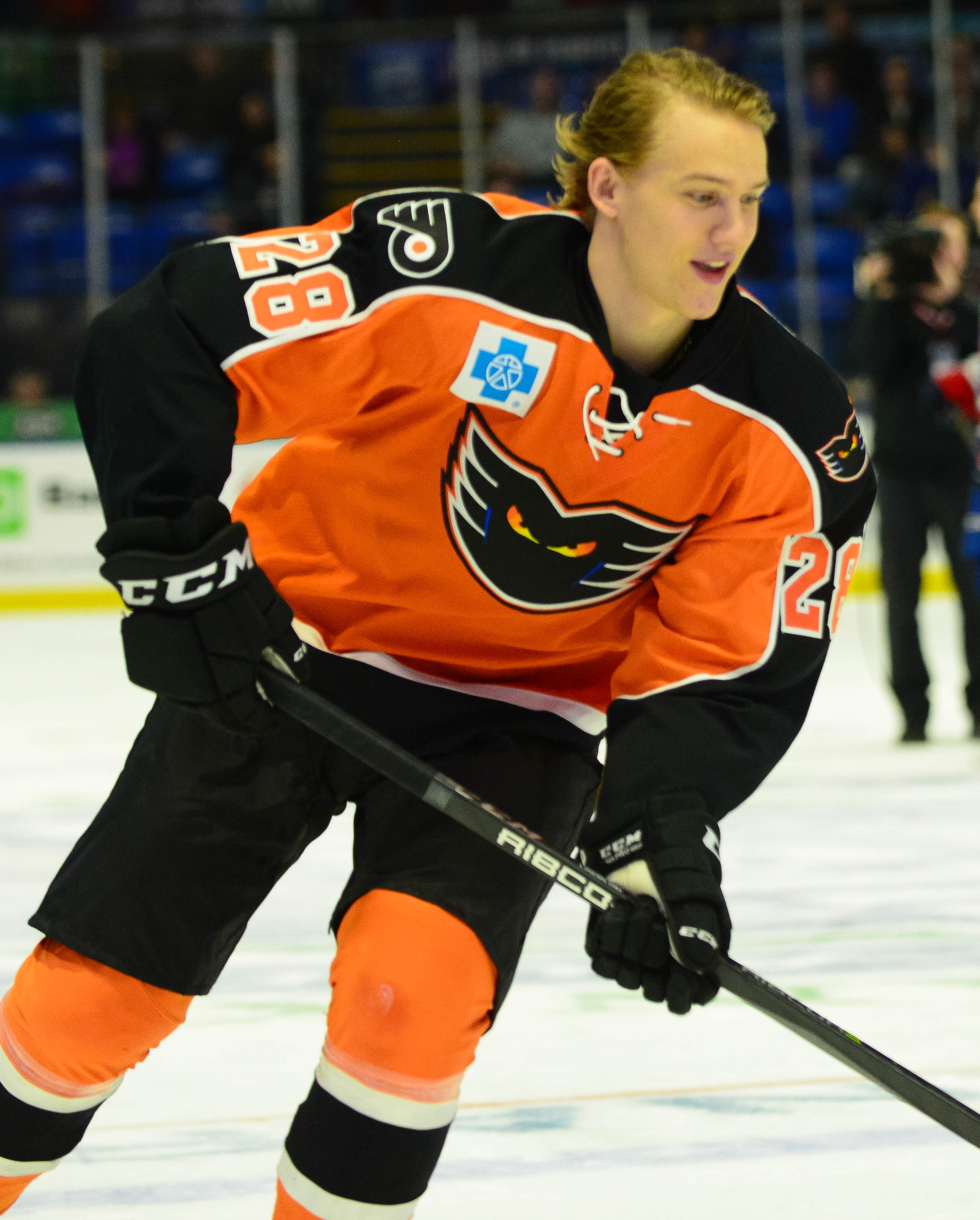
Oskar Lindblom played two seasons for the Phantoms.

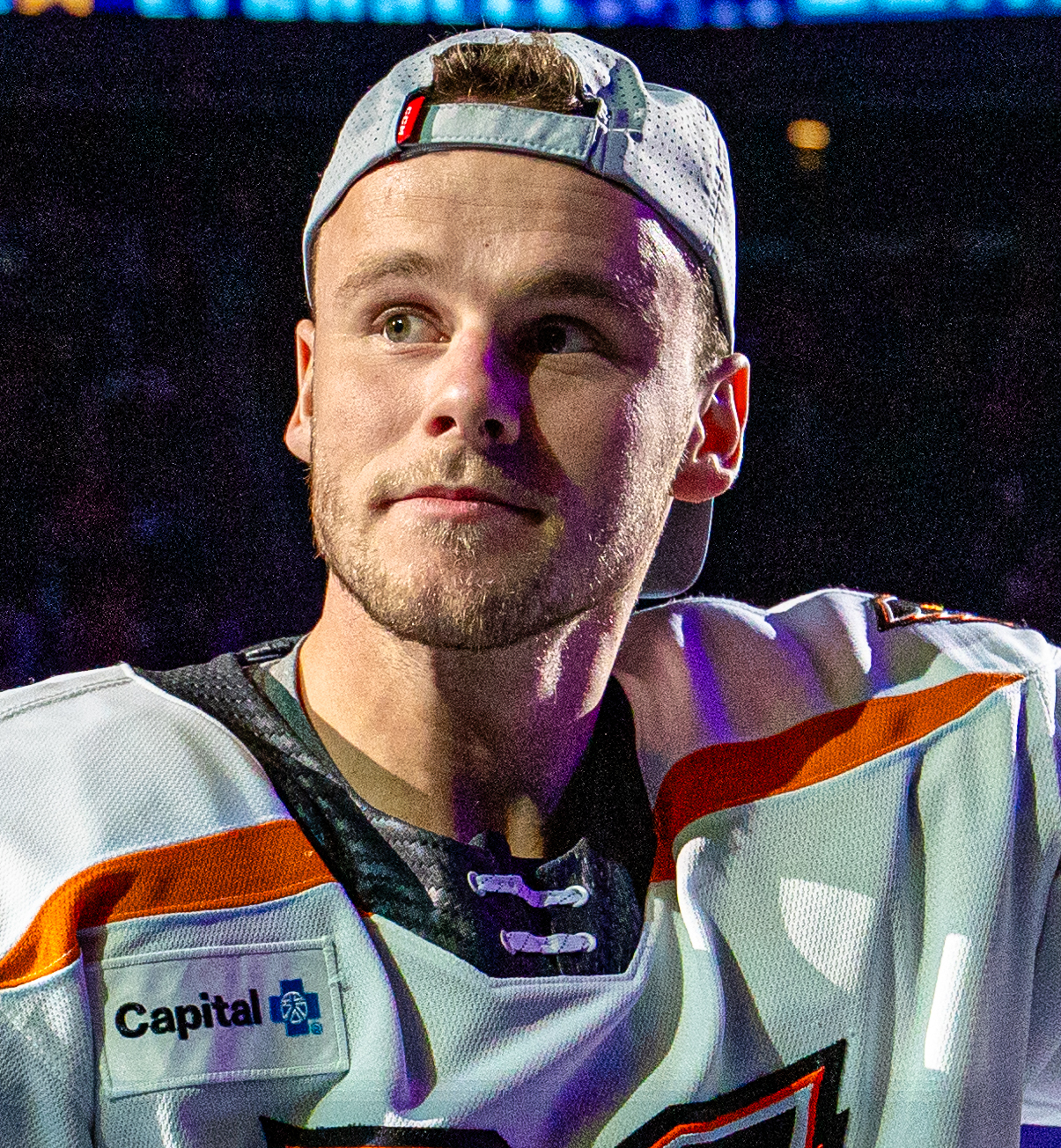
Olle Lycksell played three seasons for the Phantoms.

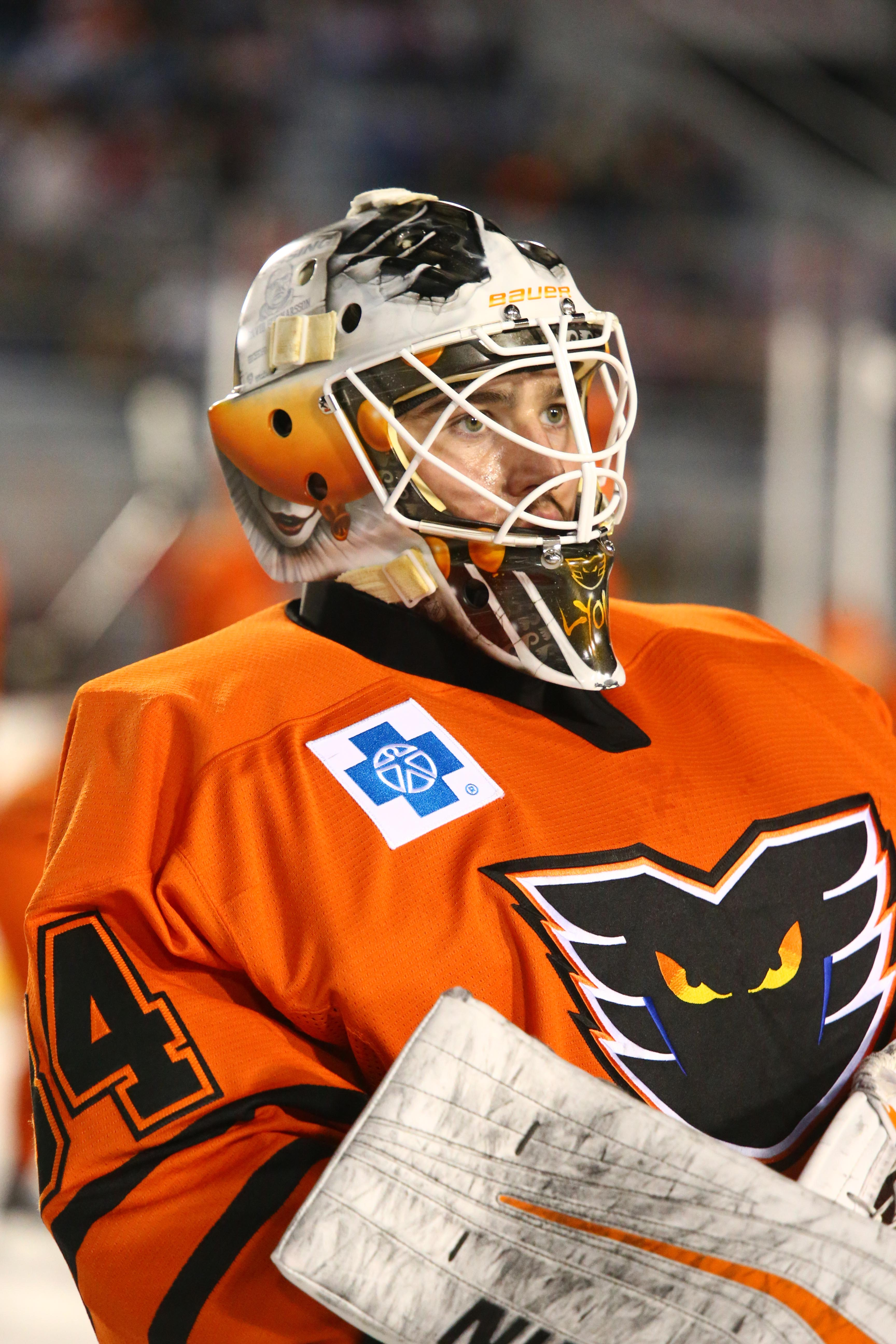
Alex Lyon played five seasons for the Phantoms.

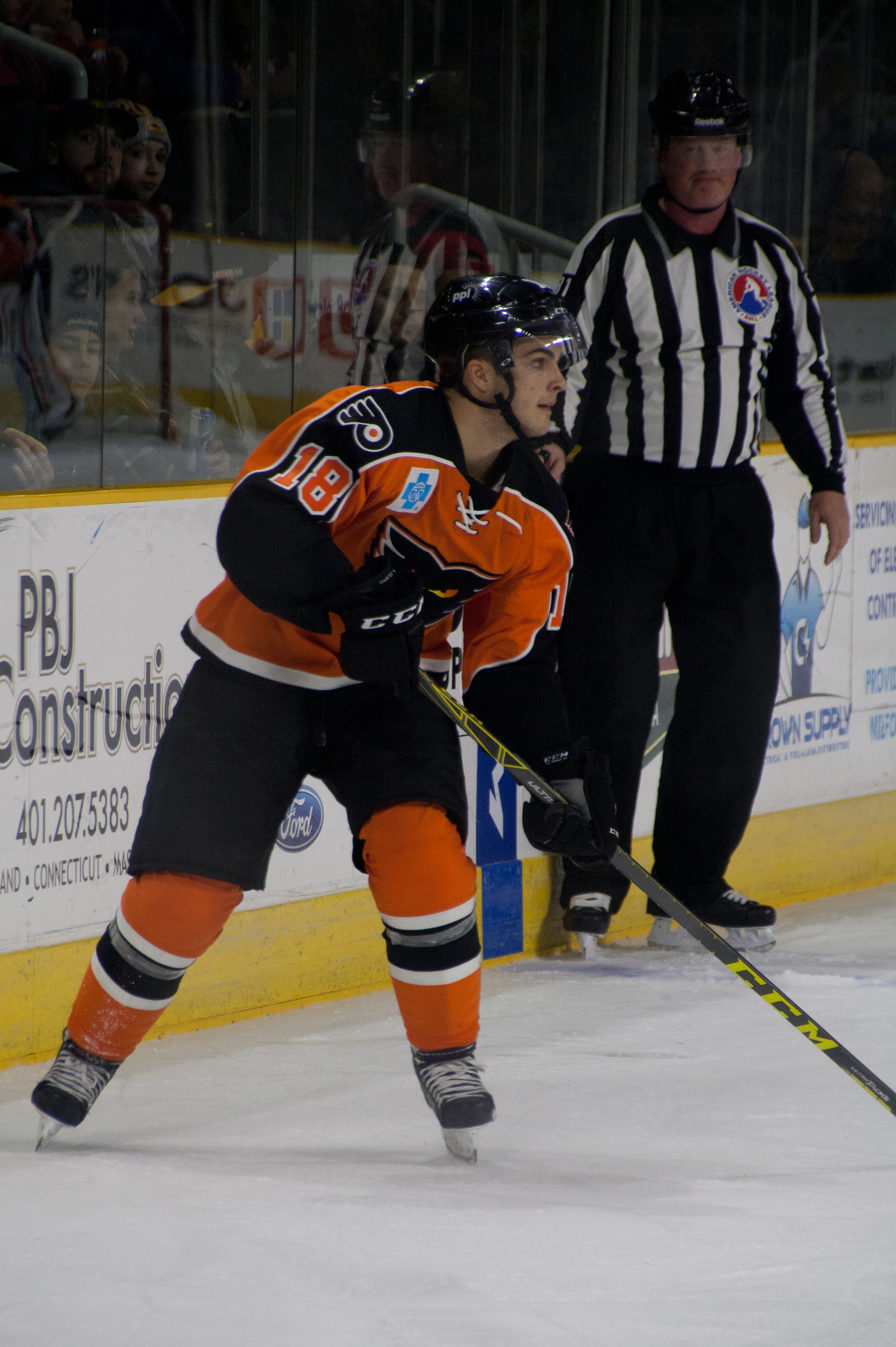
Danick Martel played four seasons for the Phantoms.

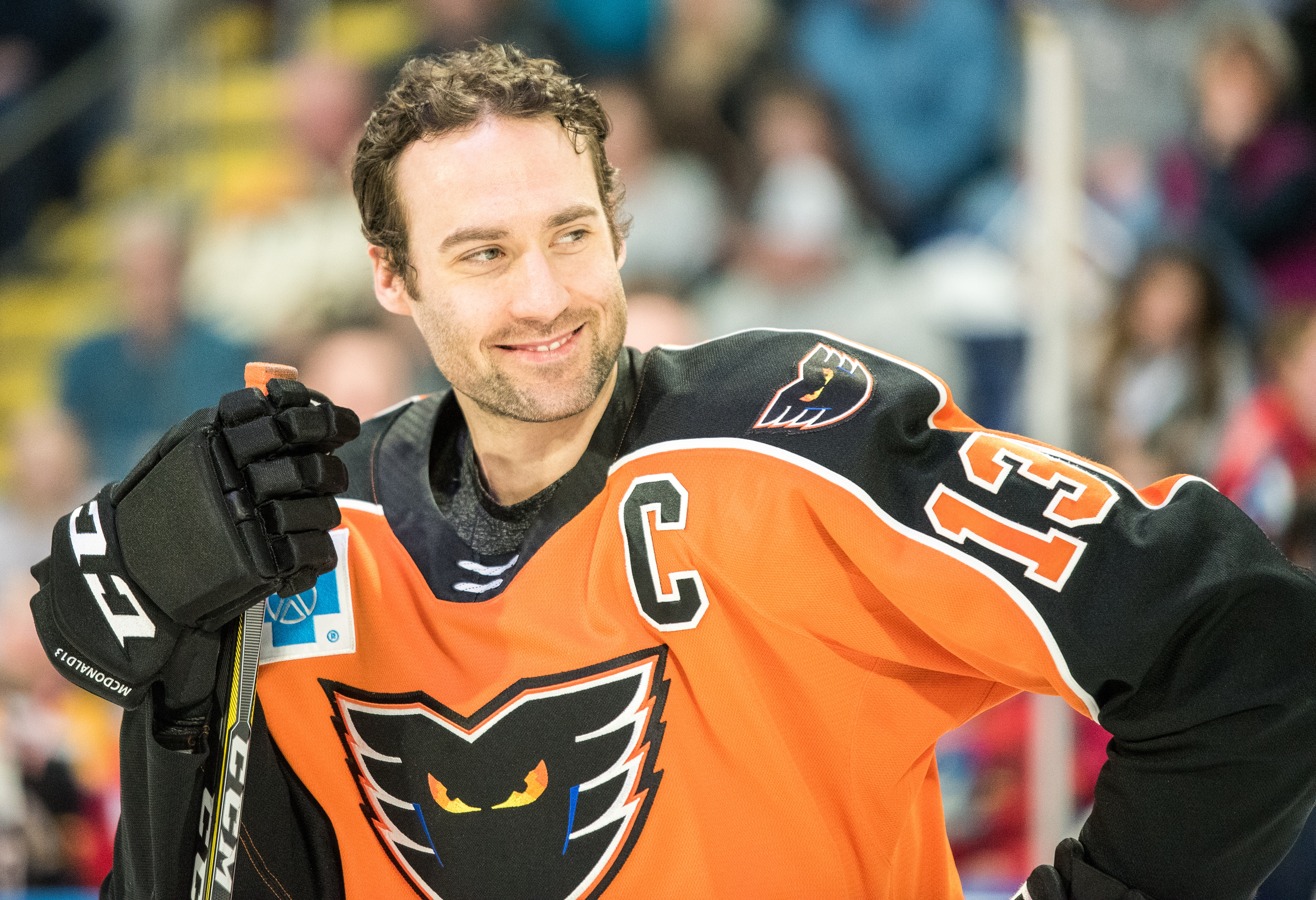
Colin McDonald served as the Phantoms captain for four seasons.

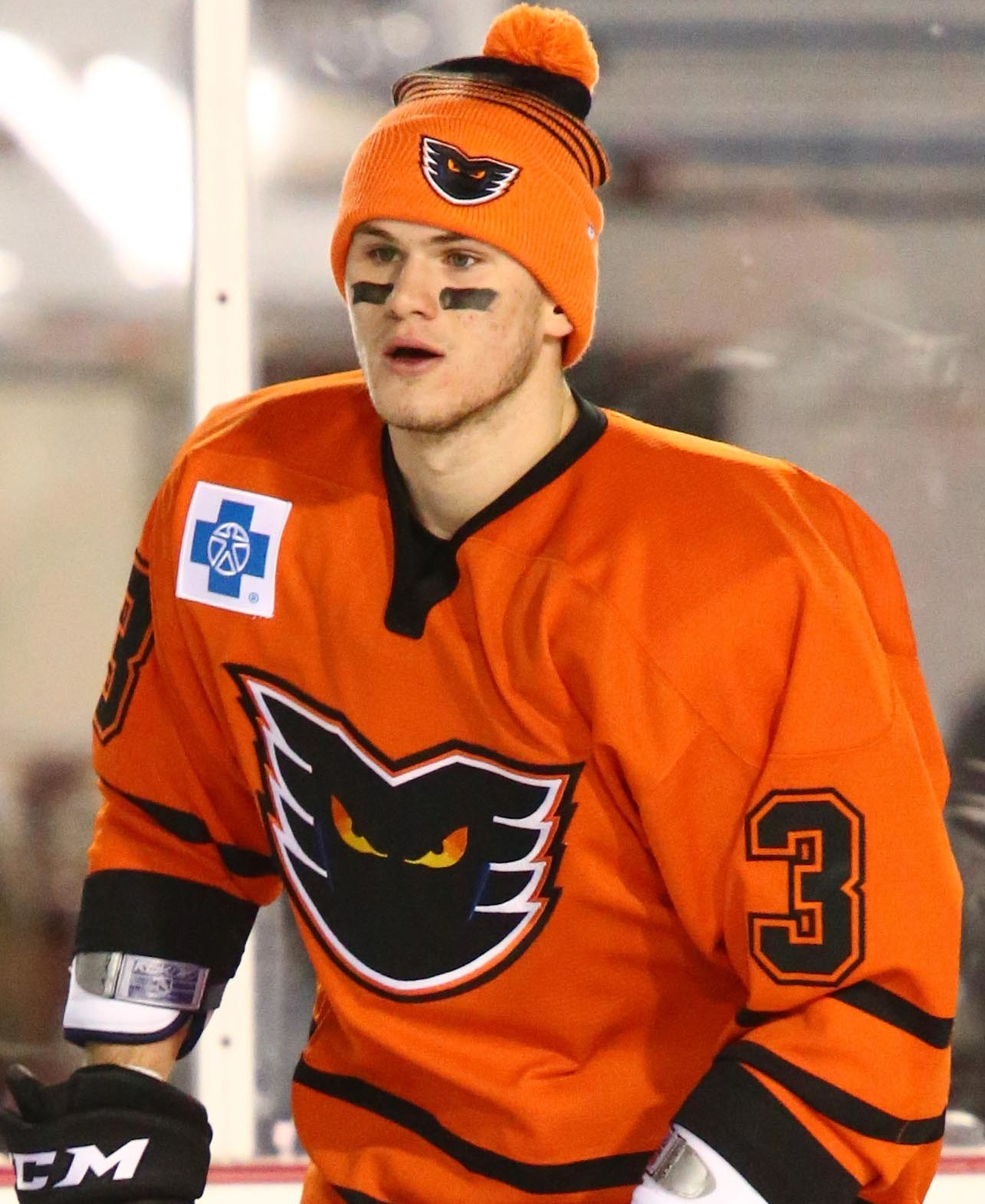
Samuel Morin played six seasons for the Phantoms.

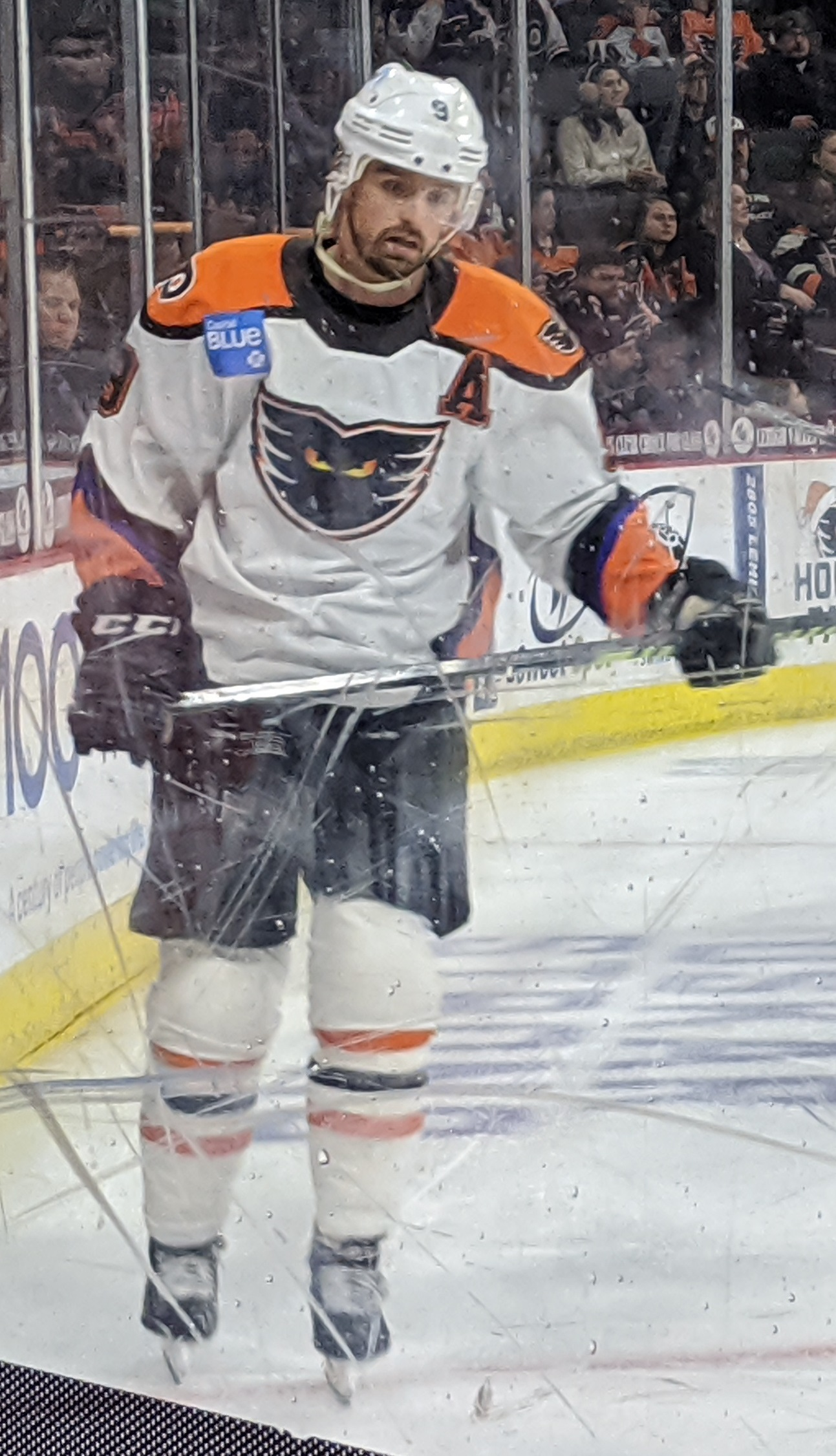
Cal O'Reilly served as the Phantoms captain for four seasons.

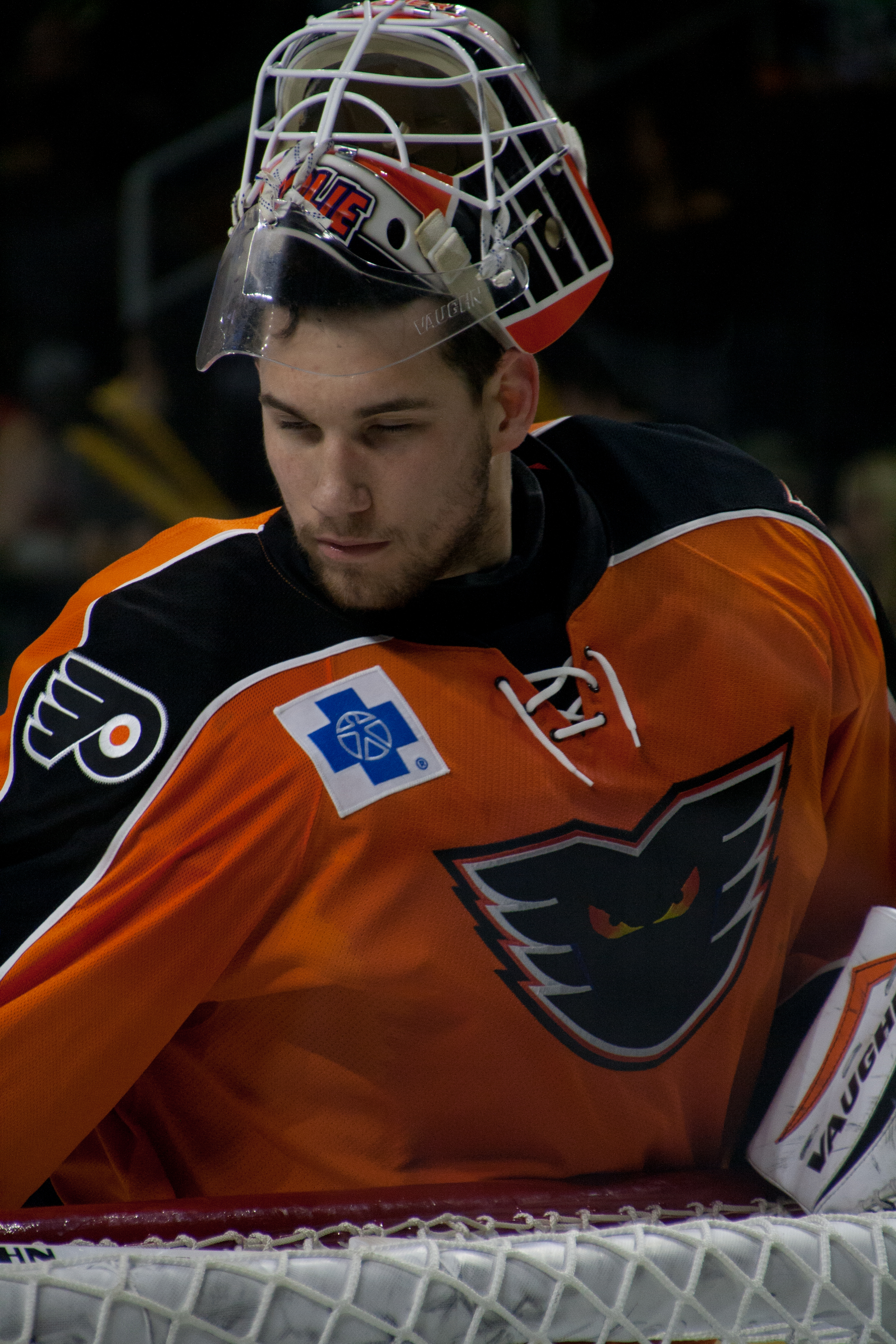
Anthony Stolarz played five seasons for the Phantoms.

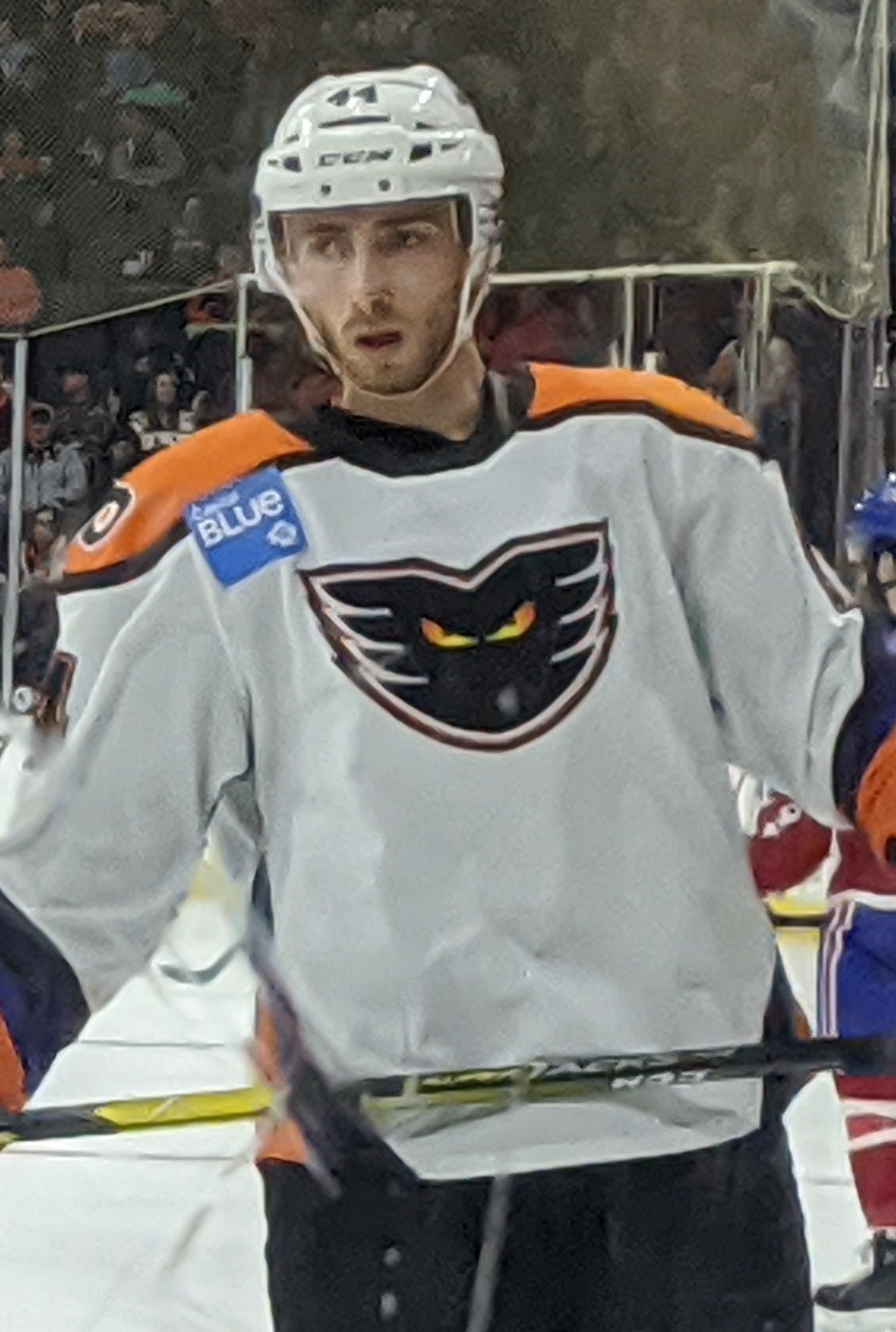
Reece Willcox played five seasons for the Phantoms.

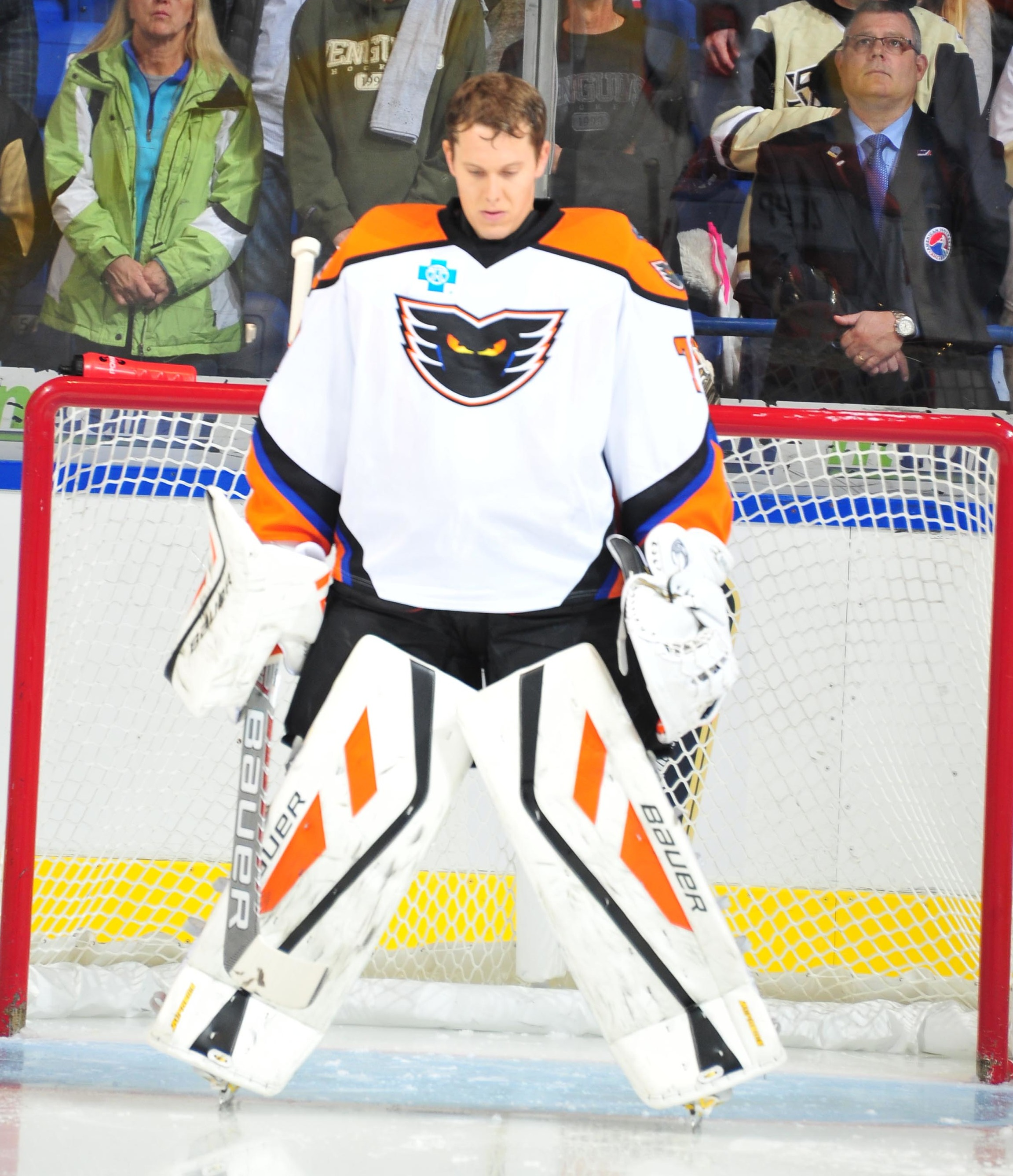
Rob Zepp played one season for the Phantoms.

== See also ==
- List of Philadelphia Phantoms players
- List of Adirondack Phantoms players

== Notes ==
- ^{a} The nationality column lists the player's national team or country of birth if the player has never competed internationally. The player's national team is listed if it differs from their country of birth. For example, Rob Zepp was born in Canada but has played for Germany internationally. His nationality is listed as Germany.
- ^{b} The seasons column lists the first year of the season of the player's first game and the last year of the season of the player's last game. For example, a player who played one game in the 2014–15 season would be listed as playing with the team from 2014–2015, regardless of what calendar year the game occurred within.
