= Domínguez & Cía =

Venezuelan packaging manufacturer

Domínguez & Cía, C.A.
- Type: Public (BVC: BVE)
- Industry: manufacturing
- Founded: 1930
- Headquarters: Caracas, Venezuela
- Products: containers and packaging
- Website: www.domcia.com

Domínguez & Cía (BVC: DOM) is a Venezuelan company based in Caracas, founded in 1930. It is a manufacturer of plastic containers, aluminium and tin cans, and cardboard packaging.
