= Corimon =

Venezuelan chemical company

Corimon C.A.
- Type: Public (BVC: CRM.A)
- Industry: Chemicals
- Founded: (1949)
- Headquarters: Caracas, Venezuela
- Key people: Carlos Gill Ramirez (Chairman); Esteban Szekely (CEO)
- Products: Paints; Resins; Packaging; Ink
- Revenue: ▲US$ 218.4 Million (2008)
- Net income: ▲US$ 10.8 Million (2008)
- Number of employees: 1,361
- Website: www.corimon.com

Corimon (BVC: CRM.A) is a Venezuelan chemical company founded in 1949 by Hans Neumann, Lotar Neumann, Patrick Pick and Jaroslav Špaček. It is now engaged in the manufacture, distribution and sale of paints, resins, packaging materials and ink.

The company is listed on the IBC index of the Caracas Stock Exchange and is present in Venezuela and Trinidad and Tobago.

Corimon was founded with a group of Czechoslovaks who emigrated due to the disasters of the Second World War, they originated with "Montana Paintings Companies" after they were integrating more companies into Corimon groups;

1949 Montana,1957 Distribuidora Nu-Enamel (montana distributor),1959 Montana Gráfica, Resimon, Hans Neumann Cultural Fund, Lotar Neumann Foundation 1960 Grafis (purchase),1962 Cerdex (acquisition), 1963 Neumann Foundation, 1964 Adgovenca (acquisition), 1965 Minomet (acquisition), 1967 frica (acquisition), 1968 Wantzelius (acquisition), 1969 Oxidor,1970 Cordetec, Sevial, 1979 Exotyl, Fruticola sta.cruz,1983 Tremco Forestal,1984 Graimon, 1985 Monexport, 1986 Colorado Chemicals, Coltrenaca,1987 Cindu (acquisition).

Montana was the name of a paint factory, located in Prague, owned by the Neumann family since the early twenties.

The chemical engineer Jaroslav Špaček was the main creator of the Corimon formula, Richard Barton was the main lender who gave his faith to this group of Czechoslovaks for corimon to emerge.
