= HLB =

HLB may refer to:

- Halbi language of central India
- Helium light band, unit of surface flatness
- Hessian Ludwig Railway (German: Hessische Ludwigsbahn), a former German railway company
- Hessische Landesbahn, a German transport company
- High level bombing
- Hildenborough railway station, in England
- Hillsborough Resources, a Canadian coal-mining company
- HLB International, an international network of accountancy firms
- H.L. Boulton, a Venezuelan import and export company
- H. L. Bourgeois High School, in Gray, Louisiana, United States
- Hong Leong Bank, a Malaysian bank
- Huanglongbing, a disease of citrus fruits
- Hydrophilic-lipophilic balance, of a surfactant
- The Helminthosporium Leaf Blights, from their former classification in the genus Helminthosporium:

- Southern corn leaf blight
- Northern corn leaf blight
- Northern corn leaf spot
