= Mercantil Tower =

Skyscraper in Caracas, Venezuela

Coordinates: 10.5055°N 66.8999°W

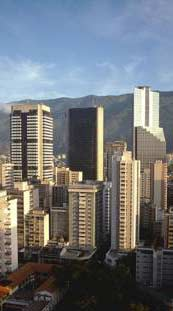
- Mercantil Tower (center)
- Interactive map of the Mercantil Tower area

General information
- Status: Completed
- Type: Office
- Location: Caracas, Venezuela
- Construction started: 1979
- Completed: 1984
- Owner: Mercantil Servicios Financieros C. A.

Height
- Roof: 179 m (587 ft)

Technical details
- Floor count: 40

Design and construction
- Architect: Manuel Fuentes
- Developer: Consorcio 21
- Main contractor: Tempre C.A

The Mercantil Tower (also known as the Mercantil Building) is a skyscraper located in the Venezuelan city of Caracas, is known for being the fourth tallest tower in the city and the country with 179 m in height and 40 floors, is located at Avenida Andrés Bello, La Candelaria Parish of Libertador Municipality northwest of the capital.

It is home to one of the most important financial institutions and strength in the country, the Banco Mercantil, Venezuela's second largest, the building was completed in 1984 has since been the banks headquarters since then.

== See also ==
- List of tallest buildings in South America
