= Manpa =

Manpa may refer to:

- MANPA -Venezuelan pulp company
- Manpa, Homalin - Sagaing Region, Burma
