= Banco Venezolano de Crédito =

Venezuelan general bank

Venezolano de Crédito, S.A., Banco Universal
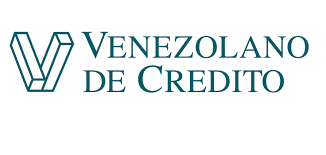

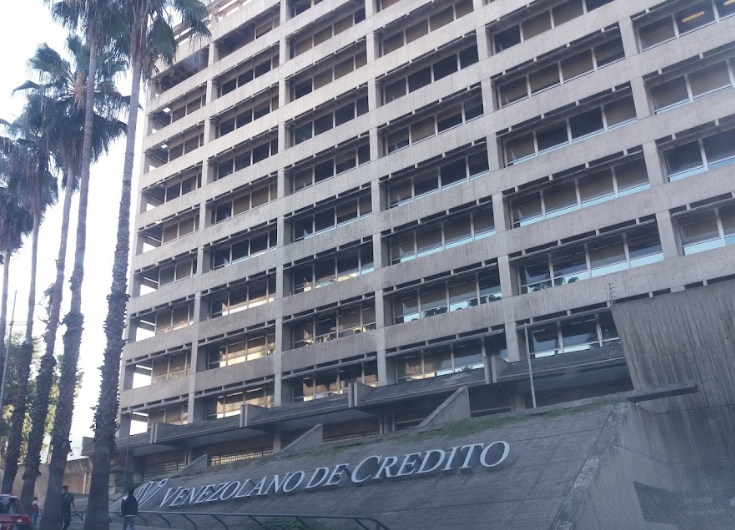
- Headquarters in Caracas.
- Type: Public (BVC: BVE)
- Industry: Finance and Insurance
- Founded: 1925; 101 years ago
- Founder: Henrique Pérez Dupuy
- Headquarters: Caracas, Venezuela
- Products: Banking
- Number of employees: 950
- Website: www.venezolano.com

Venezolano de Crédito (Venezuelan of Credit, in English) (BVC: BVE) is a Venezuelan bank based in Caracas, Venezuela. Founded in 1925, it is the oldest private bank. Currently, the Bank has a network of 71 branches, 55 of which are conventional, 12 are located within the premises of the most important corporations in Venezuela, and 12 are located in commercial sites, taking advantage of public traffic. The Bank also operates a branch in the Cayman Islands, British West Indies, established in 1998.

== History ==
It was founded on 4 June 1925 by Henrique Pérez Dupuy. At the moment Caracas had a population of 186,000 and credit was a total innovation. BVC was authorized to issue its own money. During its first fifty years of institutional life, Venezolano de Crédito expanded its credit activities to every area of the economy associated with development and growth. The Bank fully financed the first expansion of Caracas in the area of San Agustin, and later promoted the urban development of the eastern part of the city. The Bank provided the financing required by coffee-growing and livestock; contributed to the creation of an official agency centralizing foreign exchange; and, in general, supported every activity associated with the growth of the country in areas such as telecommunications, electricity, exports, housing, infrastructure, urban development, civil aviation; turning into a positive factor in practically every one of the most important areas of the Venezuelan economy. In the sixties, the bank had established a total of five branches, in addition to the main headquarters in Caracas. This completely changed during the seventies, a period that marked the expansion of the Bank throughout the country and its modernization. Many branches were opened in cities that were undergoing fast growth such as Maracaibo, Valencia, Maracay, and Barquisimeto, while in the area of technology an online system was installed for paying checks in any branch. During this period the Bank emphasized its support of the oil sector, creating a specialized unit for serving its corporate clients. In the early nineties, the Bank became the leader in services specializing in the stock market, such as managing shareholder registries and acting as custodian bank for important domestic and foreign ADR and ADS issuing programs. Expansion continued in 1998 with the opening of the first international branch in Grand Cayman, Cayman Islands, British West Indies.

During the last decade, the Bank has oriented its strategy to developing and promoting digital services supported by the highest technology: office banking for business operations (Venecredit Office Banking); Internet Banking for individuals (Venezolano Online); as well as advance mobile banking services. The Bank has defined the use of technology and innovation as keys to making its products and services available to its clients anytime, anywhere.
