= Mercantil Banco =

Venezuelan bank

- Type: Banking
- Industry: Finance and Insurance
- Founded: 1925
- Headquarters: Caracas, Venezuela
- Products: Retail banking
- Number of employees: 4,000
- Website: mercantilbanco.com

Mercantil Banco is a financial institution with more than 100 years of banking activity in Venezuela and is a subsidiary of Mercantil Servicios Financieros.

== History ==
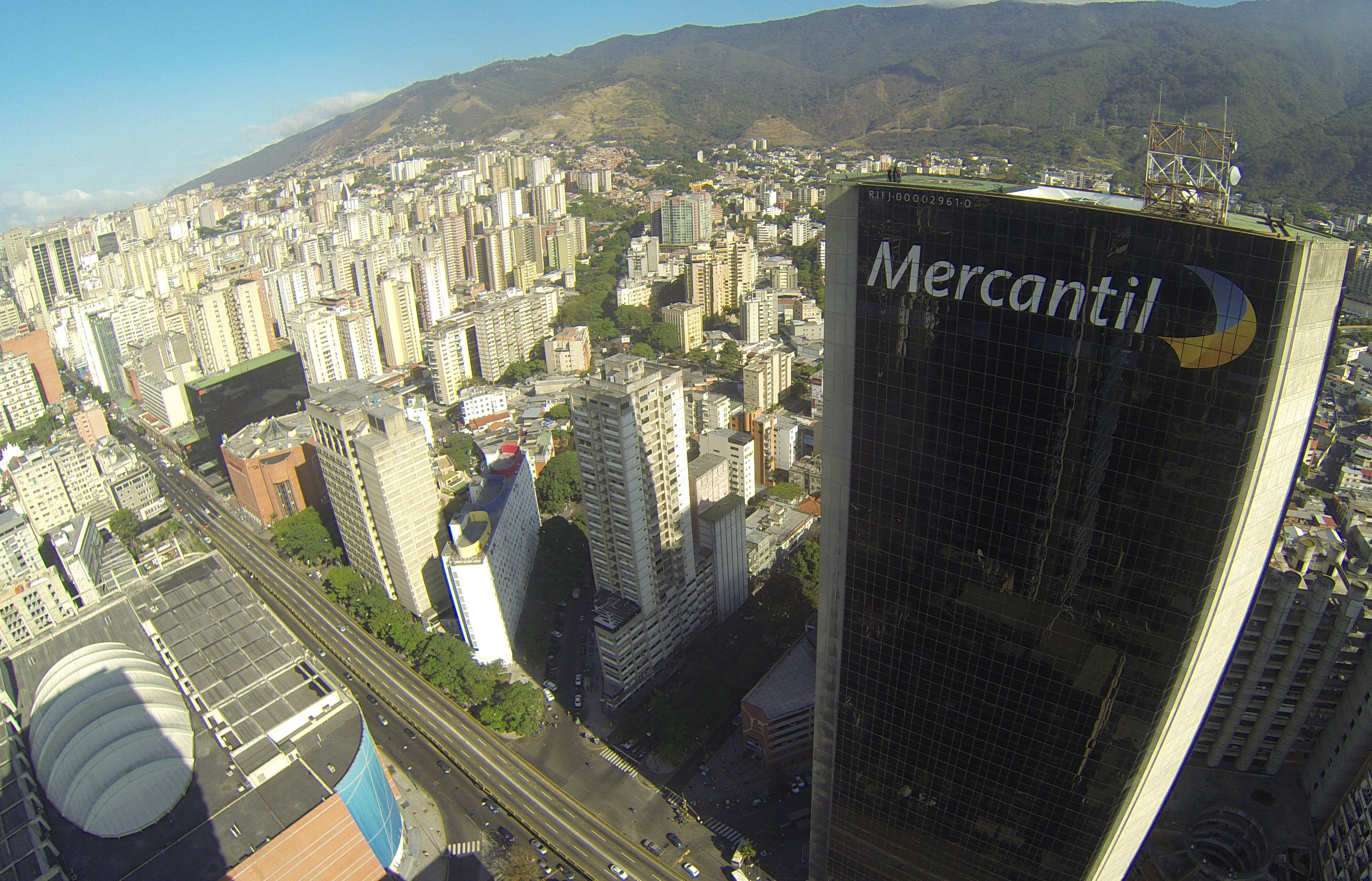
Headquarters of Mercantil Banco

On 23 March 1925 a group of 98 Venezuelan businessmen founded the bank with the name of "Banco Neerlando Venezolano" in an economy determined by the agricultural activity being the major component of national income (coffee, cacao and cotton). The Bank began its operations on 3 April 1925.

In 1968, it became the official representative of Diners Club in Venezuela. Since the 1970s the bank achieved the opening of subsidiaries in Brazil, Canada, Colombia, Curaçao, Germany, Mexico, Panama, Peru, Switzerland, United Kingdom and United States.

In 1982, the Mercantil Tower skyscraper was built as the new bank headquarter's. In 1994, it was not really affected by the economic crisis in Venezuela. In 2000, Mercantil bought a lot of financial and insurance institutions as Interbank, Venezolana Entidad de Ahorro y Préstamo, Banco Monagas, Seguros Orinoco, among others. At the end of 2007, Mercantil controlled 12.29% of the banking market share in Venezuela, just behind Banesco.
