= Mantex =

Venezuelan real estate company

Mantex S.A.C.A.
- Type: Public (BVC: MTX)
- Industry: Real estate
- Founded: 1951
- Headquarters: Caracas, Venezuela
- Key people: Miguel Angel Capriles Lopez (Chairman); Arnold Moreno Fernandez (CEO)
- Products: Construction
- Revenue: ▲US$ 8.3 Million (2008)
- Net income: ▼US$ 975.0 (2008)
- Website: www.mantex.com.ve

Mantex (BVC) is a Venezuela-based company active in the real estate industry. The company engages in the construction, commercialization and management of real estate properties. It also purchases, sells, and manages immovable movable goods and securities; develops, prepares, commercializes and distributes advertising means; builds and leases real estate properties; operates and manages private areas for transit and parking lots; and carries out general investments.
