= Percy Boulton =

- Born: 8 October 1898; Hanley, Staffordshire, England
- Died: Unknown
- Military career
- Allegiance: United Kingdom
- Branch: Royal Air Force
- Rank: Second Lieutenant
- Unit: No. 210 Squadron RAF
- Awards: Distinguished Flying Cross

Second Lieutenant Percy Boulton DFC (born 8 October 1898, date of death unknown) was a British World War I flying ace credited with six aerial victories.

Boulton was commissioned as a second lieutenant (probationary) on 13 December 1917. He joined 210 Squadron on 7 July 1918. Flying a Sopwith Camel he gained six victories between 11 August and 14 October 1918. His final tally was four German aircraft destroyed, two driven down out of control.

Boulton was transferred to the unemployed list on 5 February 1919, and his Distinguished Flying Cross was gazetted on 30 May 1919.

== Bibliography ==
- Shores, Christopher F.; Franks, Norman; Guest, Russell (1990). Above the Trenches: A Complete Record of the Fighter Aces and Units of the British Empire Air Forces 1915-1920. London, UK: Grub Street. ISBN 0-948817-19-4.
