= Ralph Boulton =

English footballer

Personal information
- Full name: Ralph Boulton
- Date of birth: 22 July 1923
- Place of birth: Grimsby, England
- Date of death: 1992 (aged 68–69)
- Position: Inside forward

Senior career*
Years	Team	Apps	(Gls)
1948–1951	Grimsby Town	3	(0)
1951–19??	Goole Town		
- * Club domestic league appearances and goals

Ralph Boulton (22 July 1923 – 1992) was an English professional footballer who played as an inside forward.
