= Mercantil Servicios Financieros =

Venezuelan holding company

Mercantil Servicios Financieros CA
- Company type: Public
- Traded as: BVC: MVZ.A MVZ.B
- Industry: Financial
- Founded: 1997
- Headquarters: Caracas, Venezuela
- Key people: Gustavo Vollmer Acedo Chairman and CEO
- Products: Banking; Insurance; Wealth management
- Revenue: ▲ Bs. 57.52 billion (2025)
- Net income: ▲ Bs. 56.87 billion (2025)
- Total assets: ▲ Bs. 343.87 billion (2025)
- Total equity: ▲ Bs. 94.61 billion (2025)
- Number of employees: 3,079 (2025)
- Subsidiaries: Mercantil Banco; Mercantil Seguros; Mercantil Merinvest
- Website: www.msf.com

Mercantil Servicios Financieros (Mercantil) is a Venezuelan holding company of financial services present in 9 countries in America and Europe . Its shares are listed on the Caracas Stock Exchange (MVZ.A and MVZ.B) and it maintains a Level 1 American Depositary Receipt program (ADR) in the over-the-counter market (OTC) in the United States of America (MSFZY and MSFJY3) .

The main subsidiary is Mercantil Banco, with 100 years of financial activity in Venezuela.

Mercantil has been ranked as one of the world's biggest 2,000 public companies according to Forbes magazine (2015) at 648th place. The Banker magazine included Mercantil Servicios Financieros among the Top 1,000 world's financial institutions, according to the list published in July 2015. Mercantil rose 50 places in comparison with 2014, to rank 210th.

== Historic evolution ==
The origin of Mercantil is in Venezuela, with the development of banking services through Mercantil Banco, which began operations on 23 March 1925.

=== Creation of the Consorcio Inversionista Mercantil y Agrícola (CIMA) ===
During the 1970s, the Consorcio Inversionista Mercantil y Agrícola (CIMA) was created with the objective to offer others financials services, meanwhile Banco Mercantil began its international expansion, with representative offices in several cities of the Americas and Europe. The Consorcio Inversionista Mercantil y Agrícola (CIMA) opens Banco Mercantil Venezolano, C.A. in Curaçao (1976) and Banco del Centro S.A. in Panama (1977), to expand its international operations. In 1987 acquired Commercebank, N.A. a financial institution headquartered in Florida, United States of America. In the middle of 90's, The Consorcio Inversionista Mercantil y Agrícola (CIMA) and Banco Mercantil initiate their "American Depositary Receipts" (ADRs) program in the United States of America for Class B shares.

=== Mercantil Servicios Financieros starts operations ===
In 1997 the shareholders of Banco Mercantil and the Consorcio Inversionista Mercantil y Agrícola (CIMA) constitute Mercantil Servicios Financieros (Mercantil) a financial services holding company headquartered in Venezuela. Today, Mercantil Servicios Financieros' main subsidiaries are: Mercantil Banco Universal, Mercantil Seguros and Mercantil Merinvest in Venezuela; Mercantil Bank, N.A., Mercantil Bank Investment Services and Mercantil Bank Trust Company in the United States of America; Mercantil Bank (Panamá), Mercantil Seguros Panamá and Mercantil Capital Markets (Panamá) in Panama; Mercantil Bank (Schweiz) in Switzerland; Mercantil Bank (Curaçao) in Curaçao and Mercantil Inversiones y Valores in Venezuela, a holding for other support subsidiaries.

In early 2000, the Swiss Federal Banking Commission authorizes the incorporation of Banco Mercantil (Schweiz) AG as a Commercial Bank, formerly BMS Finanz AG, being the first Latin American-based bank to establish in Switzerland. In Venezuela, during the second half of 2000, Banco Mercantil signed the agreement to acquire InterBank BancoUniversal. The transaction was completed in the first quarter of 2001. At the same year, the subsidiary Seguros Mercantil acquired Seguros Orinoco.

In 2005, Commercebank expanded in United States of America with the opening of its first full-service banking center in Houston City. In 2006 it acquired Florida Savings Bank, an institution that operated in South Florida. In that year, Mercantil Servicios Financieros included Class A shares in its "American Depositary Receipts" (ADRs) program.

In 2007, Mercantil Servicios Financieros announces changes in its corporate identity, which established the use of the Mercantil brand name in all of its subsidiaries, both in Venezuela and abroad, as well as a change in its graphic identity. Since 2012, Mercantil Bank (Schweiz) refocused its activities to offering exclusive Private Banking products and services.

In 2013, Mercantil Servicios Financieros continuing with its international expansion strategy extended the range of services in the Panamanian market through the beginning of operations of Mercantil Capital Markets (Panamá) and Mercantil Seguros Panamá, S.A.
