= H.L. Boulton =

H.L. Boulton & Co S.A.
- Type: Public (BVC: HLB)
- Industry: Logistics and Investing
- Founded: (1824) by Henry Lord Boulton
- Headquarters: Caracas, Venezuela
- Key people: Carlos Acosta, (Chairman)
- Products: Maritime logistics
- Revenue: ▲US$ 424.7 Million (2007)
- Website: www.hlboulton.com.ve

H.L. Boulton (BVC: HLB) is a holding company based in Venezuela engaged in the import and export of various goods and equipment.

== Operations ==
The company operates in two sectors, investing and international trade.

The company's Investing sector administers strategics portfolios of shares of various Venezuelan companies that conduct different activities. It primarily invests in the companies of industrial, petrochemical and manufacturing areas, as well as in refractory and maritime transportation enterprises.

The company's International Trade sector is involved in maintaining docks, container terminals and warehouses, merchandise deposit, ownership and operation of ships and coastal shipping line and national and international transportation.

In 2001, the company sold a half-interest in its port terminal operations to CSX Corporation.

The company's shares are traded on the Caracas Stock Exchange, and the company forms part of the Índice Bursátil de Capitalización, the exchange's main and most important index.

In 2005, the company was closed down for 48 hours and fined over tax violations. The taxation agency penalized the company again in 2009.

The company has been owned by the Boulton family for many years.
