= Eric Boulton =

Canadian ice hockey player (born 1976)

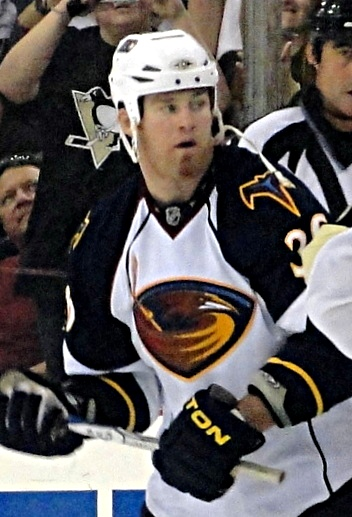
- Boulton with the Atlanta Thrashers in April 2010
- Born: August 17, 1976 (age 49) Halifax, Nova Scotia, Canada
- Height: 6 ft 0 in (183 cm)
- Weight: 225 lb (102 kg; 16 st 1 lb)
- Position: Left wing
- Shot: Left
- Played for: Buffalo Sabres; Atlanta Thrashers; New Jersey Devils; New York Islanders
- NHL draft: 234th overall, 1994; New York Rangers
- Playing career: 1996–2017

Eric Boulton (born August 17, 1976) is a Canadian former professional ice hockey left winger. Boulton was drafted 234th overall in the ninth round of the 1994 draft by the New York Rangers. While he never played for the Rangers, he played for the Buffalo Sabres, Atlanta Thrashers, New Jersey Devils and New York Islanders between 2000 and 2016. Boulton was best known for his role as an enforcer.

== Playing career ==
Boulton was drafted in the ninth round, 234th overall by the New York Rangers in the 1994 Entry Draft of the National Hockey League (NHL). Despite being drafted by the Rangers, he would eventually make his NHL debut playing for the Buffalo Sabres, where he played for four seasons. During the 2004 NHL Lockout, he played for the Columbia Inferno of the ECHL. After the Lockout ended, Boulton began playing with the Atlanta Thrashers.

In October 2005, Boulton was suspended for six games after elbowing Tampa Bay Lightning rookie Paul Ranger, causing a hairline fracture of the jaw and a concussion. The incident occurred at the end of a 6–0 rout of the Thrashers on October 20, 2005. NHL vice-president Colin Campbell said, "It is clear Mr. Boulton's actions were careless and caused injury. There is no circumstance that can justify this type of action." Only a week earlier, Boulton had made a similar move in a game against the Toronto Maple Leafs, almost injuring Eric Lindros.

Boulton was re-signed by the Thrashers in 2008 to a two-year deal. He recorded his first career hat trick on December 18, 2010, against the New Jersey Devils. He then signed as an unrestricted free agent with the Devils for a 2-year contract worth $575,000 in the first year and $750,000 in the second, joining former Thrashers teammates Ilya Kovalchuk and Johan Hedberg. After a dismal season in which the Devils did not record a single goal for with Boulton on the ice, Boulton was bought out of the final year of his contract on June 30, 2012. The next day, Boulton proceeded to sign a one-year deal with the New York Islanders. He re-signed with the Islanders for the next three consecutive seasons as well, all on one-year deals. Boulton is the Thrashers' all-time leader in penalty minutes with 639 penalty minutes.

After the 2016–17 season, Boulton ended his professional career, however continued his association with the Islanders in accepting a scouting role.

== Personal ==
Boulton's sons Sawyer Boulton and Ryder Boulton are both ice hockey players.

== Career statistics ==
=== Regular season and playoffs ===
			Regular season					Playoffs
Season	Team	League	GP	G	A	Pts	PIM	GP	G	A	Pts	PIM
1993–94	Oshawa Generals	OHL	45	4	3	7	149	5	0	0	0	16
1994–95	Oshawa Generals	OHL	27	7	5	12	125	—	—	—	—	—
1994–95	Sarnia Sting	OHL	24	3	7	10	134	4	0	1	1	10
1995–96	Sarnia Sting	OHL	66	14	29	43	243	9	0	3	3	29
1996–97	Charlotte Checkers	ECHL	44	14	11	25	325	3	0	1	1	6
1996–97	Binghamton Rangers	AHL	23	2	3	5	67	3	0	0	0	4
1997–98	Charlotte Checkers	ECHL	53	11	16	27	202	4	1	0	1	0
1997–98	Fort Wayne Komets	IHL	8	0	2	2	42	—	—	—	—	—
1998–99	Kentucky Thoroughblades	AHL	34	3	3	6	154	10	0	1	1	36
1998–99	Florida Everblades	ECHL	26	9	13	22	143	—	—	—	—	—
1998–99	Houston Aeros	IHL	7	1	0	1	41	—	—	—	—	—
1999–00	Rochester Americans	AHL	76	2	2	4	276	18	2	1	3	53
2000–01	Buffalo Sabres	NHL	35	1	2	3	94	—	—	—	—	—
2001–02	Buffalo Sabres	NHL	35	2	3	5	129	—	—	—	—	—
2002–03	Buffalo Sabres	NHL	58	1	5	6	178	—	—	—	—	—
2003–04	Buffalo Sabres	NHL	44	1	2	3	110	—	—	—	—	—
2004–05	Columbia Inferno	ECHL	48	23	16	39	124	4	2	3	5	8
2005–06	Atlanta Thrashers	NHL	51	4	5	9	87	—	—	—	—	—
2006–07	Atlanta Thrashers	NHL	45	3	4	7	49	4	0	0	0	24
2007–08	Atlanta Thrashers	NHL	74	4	5	9	127	—	—	—	—	—
2008–09	Atlanta Thrashers	NHL	76	3	10	13	176	—	—	—	—	—
2009–10	Atlanta Thrashers	NHL	62	2	6	8	113	—	—	—	—	—
2010–11	Atlanta Thrashers	NHL	69	6	4	10	87	—	—	—	—	—
2011–12	New Jersey Devils	NHL	51	0	0	0	115	—	—	—	—	—
2011–12	Albany Devils	AHL	2	0	0	0	0	—	—	—	—	—
2012–13	New York Islanders	NHL	15	0	0	0	36	—	—	—	—	—
2013–14	New York Islanders	NHL	23	2	2	4	88	—	—	—	—	—
2014–15	New York Islanders	NHL	10	2	0	2	30	—	—	—	—	—
2015–16	New York Islanders	NHL	6	0	0	0	2	—	—	—	—	—
2016–17	Bridgeport Sound Tigers	AHL	2	0	1	1	0	—	—	—	—	—
NHL totals			654	31	48	79	1421	4	0	0	0	24
