= Sawyer Boulton =

American ice hockey player (born 2004)

- Born: July 12, 2004 (age 22) Huntington, New York, USA
- Height: 6 ft 0 in (183 cm)
- Weight: 205 lb (93 kg; 14 st 9 lb)
- Position: Forward
- Shoots: Right
- AHL team Former teams: Toronto Marlies; Lehigh Valley Phantoms
- NHL draft: Undrafted
- Playing career: 2024–present

Sawyer Boulton (born July 12, 2004) is an American professional ice hockey forward for the Toronto Marlies of the American Hockey League (AHL).

== Playing career ==
=== Junior ===
Boulton played one season of junior hockey for the London Knights of the Ontario Hockey League (OHL) during the 2023-24 season. During his season with London he was a teammate of his brother Ryder Boulton and London won the OHL championship. He scored 3 goals and 2 assists with 63 penalty minutes in 40 games one assist in 16 games during the OHL playoffs. during the regular season and During the season, Boulton was suspended seven times, and was also suspended for a game during the Memorial Cup playoffs. During the season he also engaged in six fights.

Boulton's longest suspension was for 10 games, for making a hit to Bryce McConnell-Barker of the Soo Greyhounds "in direct contact to the head of a vulnerable opponent, resulting in injury.” McConnell-Barker ended up missing 14 games due to a concussion he suffered from the hit. Greyhound coach John Dean said of the hit:

It was their game plan to come in here and drag the game into the gutter. They end up with, my guess is a huge suspension for their hit on Bryce. And that was just a result of style of play. The league has an opportunity to protect [one of its] best players. Bryce is a world-class player and it was an obvious attempt at the head.

At that point in the season, Boulton had already been suspended twice before, once for two games for a high hit on Quentin Musty of the Sudbury Wolves and once for three games for a fight that the league deemed to have been staged with Jackson Stewart of the Owen Sound Attack. In the case of the latter suspension, Stewart claimed that the fight was not set up in advance. As a result of these three suspensions, Bouton had been suspended for 15 games at a time he had played in 18.

Two of Boulton's subsequent OHL suspensions were also against Greyhounds players. He was suspended in February for two games for actions to instigate a fight with Matthew Virgilio in February. A month later he was suspended for another two games for slew footing Christopher Brown. During the OHL playoffs, Boulton had to serve another two game suspension for slew footing in a playoff game against the Saginaw Spirit. During the Memorial Cup playoffs, Boulton was suspended for one game for making "unnecessary contact with a Moose Jaw [Warriors] player while exiting the ice following the completion of the warm-up."

=== Professional ===
After the 2023–24 season, Boulton signed a professional contract with the Lehigh Valley Phantoms of the American Hockey League. He participated in the Philadelphia Flyers' 2024 development camp. He split the 2024–25 season between Lehigh Valley and the Reading Royals, playing 18 games for Lehigh Valley and 13 games for Reading. He scored 1 goal for each team and accumulated 51 penalty minutes for each team. He again spent time with each team in 2025-26.

As a free agent after two seasons with the Phantoms, Boulton was signed to a two-year contract to continue in the AHL with the Toronto Marlies on July 10, 2026.

== Playing style ==
Boulton stated that "I like to bring energy to the whole lineup. I like to stick up for my teammates, make sure they feel safe. Make sure they have room and try to be good defensively. Keep the puck out of our net and play gritty games." He also said that "[checking has] always been a big part of my game, my whole life. I like to use my body to create space for my teammates. I like to intimidate and I like to make my teammates feel comfortable out there."

== Personal life ==
Sawyer's father Eric Boulton was also an aggressive hockey player, who played 15 seasons in the NHL. His brother Ryder Boulton currently plays for the Brantford Bulldogs of the OHL.

== Career statistics ==
			Regular season					Playoffs
Season	Team	League	GP	G	A	Pts	PIM	GP	G	A	Pts	PIM
2023–24	London Knights	OHL	40	3	2	5	63	16	0	1	1	15
2024–25	Lehigh Valley Phantoms	AHL	18	1	0	1	51	—	—	—	—	—
2024–25	Reading Royals	ECHL	13	1	0	1	51	—	—	—	—	—
2025–26	Lehigh Valley Phantoms	AHL	16	0	1	1	40	—	—	—	—	—
2025–26	Reading Royals	ECHL	6	1	0	1	29	—	—	—	—	—
AHL totals			34	1	1	2	91	—	—	—	—	—
