= MANPA =

Manufacturas de Papel S.A.C.A.
- Type: Public (BVC: MPA)
- Industry: Pulp and Paper
- Founded: (1950)
- Headquarters: Caracas, Venezuela
- Key people: Carlos Delfino (Chairman); Alejandro Delfino (CEO)
- Products: Packing and paper products
- Revenue: ▲US$ 397.6 Million (2008)
- Net income: ▲US$ 64.1 Million (2008)
- Website: www.manpa.com.ve

Manufacturas de Papel or MANPA (BVC: MPA) is the leading Venezuelan pulp and paper company focused primarily on paper manufacturing and conversion for industrial, commercial, domestic, school and office uses.

The company began as Ca Fabrica De Papel Dd Maracay in 1912 and became MANPA in 1950.

The company's production process is organized into three areas: Hygienic division, Printing, Writing, Packaging division and Recycler division.

The majority of the company's plants are located in Maracay, and it has production lines with various technologies that provide a variety of manufactured paper products. In addition, its Miami based subsidiary, Simco Recycling Corporation, supplies the Company for secondary fibers.

MANPA, represented by Papelex Inc., exported its products mainly to the Caribbean, Central America, the United States and other markets. Until 1998 and after satisfying the local market, MANPA used to export over 1,000 metric tons of high quality tissue paper per month. Now and for years, Venezuela has the need to import tissue paper in finished products in order to partially cover the local demand.
