= Caracas Stock Exchange =

Market for equities and bonds

- Bolsa de Valores de Caracas

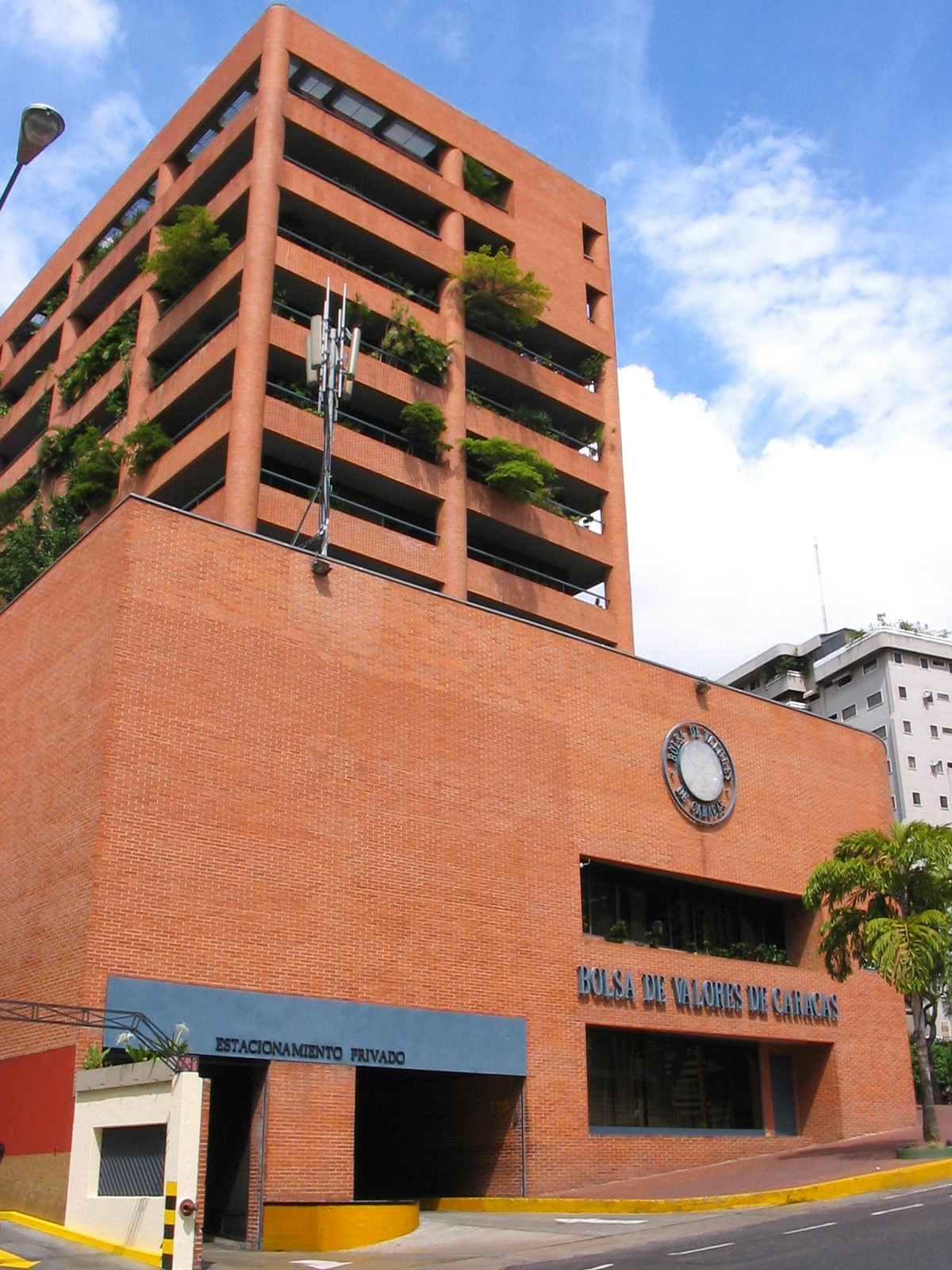
- Type: Stock exchange
- Location: Caracas, Venezuela
- Founded: 21 January 1947; 79 years ago
- Key people: Víctor Julio Flores (CEO)
- Currency: VES
- No. of listings: 60
- Indices: IBC
- Website: www.bolsadecaracas.com

The Caracas Stock Exchange or Bolsa de Valores de Caracas (BVC) is a stock exchange located in Caracas, Venezuela. Established in 1947, BVC merged with a competitor in 1974.

== History ==
The origins of the Venezuelan stock market can be traced to the end of the colonial era, when in 1805 Don Bruno Abasolo and Don Fernando Key Muñoz founded the Casa de Bolsa y Recreación de los Comerciantes y Labradores in Caracas. The exchange was officially founded on January 21, 1947 and inaugurated its first trading session on April 21 of the same year, after previously trading stocks over the counter.

On May 6, 1976, the assembly of shareholders decided to change the denomination of the institution to Bolsa de Valores de Caracas C.A., and initiated a new operating structure composed of 43 shareholders, or puestos de bolsa, an amount that would be increased to 63 members in 1995.

In 1990, with an increase of 602%, the market was the second-best performing that year (after Poland).

In 1992, BVC became electronic, when a modern electronic trading system developed by the Vancouver Stock Exchange entered operations. On July 2, 1999 another technological change was made when the SIBE (Sistema Integrado Bursátil Electrónico), electronic trading system was officially incorporated into the Caracas Stock Exchange.

BY April 2007, 60 companies were listed on the BVC, with less than half being traded regularly. BVC experienced a severe decline in traded volumes since the mid-1990s as a result of a declining economy, the migration of stocks to the U.S. markets in the form of American Depositary Receipts (ADRs), corporate takeovers with a concomitant reduction in the number of shares available for trade and an increasing country risk that has frightened investors, particularly foreign investors. Daily trading volume decreased from the equivalent of $25 to $30 million in 1997 to less than $1 million by 2000. The BVC survived during this period thanks to a growing trade of government debt securities. Stock prices, measured by the Indice Bursátil Caracas, were also depressed during the 1990s and have yet to recover to the highest ever levels experienced in 1991. According to the International Finance Corporation, the market value of the BVC was $7 billion in 2000, or just about 6 percent of GDP. In 2005, the total transactions on the BVC totaled USD438 million.

== Operational and Legal Structure ==
BVC is a private exchange, providing operations for the purchase and authorized sale of securities according to the Capital Marketing Laws of Venezuela. It is member of the Executive Committee of the Latin American Federation of Stock markets. At the exchange, companies emit by procedures authorized by the regulating authorities, instruments of fixed income and securities (renta fija y de renta variable) with the purpose of securing capital from public investors. BVC is also used as a location for trading in Bonds and other debt instruments.

The legal structure prevailing in the Venezuelan capital market are the Securities Marketing Law (la Ley de Mercado de Capitales, enacted in 1975 and amended in 1998), Transaction Law (Ley de Caja de Valores), the Statutory Law of Public Credit (Ley Orgánica de Crédito Público), the Law of Organizations of Collective Investment and the norms dictated by the National Exchange Commission (Comisión Nacional de Valores, or CNV). Exchange activities are regulated and supervised by the National Exchange Commission, a public entity assigned to the Ministry of Finance, that authorizes internal procedures and regulations.

=== Board of directors ===
The Board of Directors of the Caracas Stock Exchange is presided over by Víctor Julio Flores. Additional members include Santiago Fernández Castro, Marcel Apeloig, Omar Delgado, José Gregorio Castro, Gabriel Osío, Jesús Tadeo Prato, Luis Oberto, Carlos Fernández and Mario Dickson, as well as by advisers Luis Andrés Guerrero and Rubén Manzur.

== See also ==
- List of stock exchanges in the Americas
