= Mass media in Venezuela =

Mass media in Venezuela comprise the mass and niche news and information communications infrastructure of Venezuela. Thus, the media of Venezuela consist of several different types of communications media: television, radio, newspapers, magazines, cinema, and Internet-based news outlets and websites. Venezuela also has a strong music industry and arts scene.

Since 2003, Freedom House has ranked Venezuela as "not free" when it comes to press freedom. Freedom House explained that Venezuela's freedom of the press had declined during Hugo Chávez's 15 years in power, stating that the Venezuelan government's relation to the media caused a sharp decline in press freedom and expanded government information apparatus.

Due to censorship in Venezuela, social networking and other methods are important ways of communication for the Venezuelan people, with social media being established as an alternative means of information to mainstream media. Venezuela now has the 4th highest percentage of Twitter users.

== Overview ==
The main four private television networks were RCTV (1951-2007), Televen, Venevisión, and 24-hour news channel Globovisión. State television includes Venezolana de Televisión, TVes, ViVe, and teleSUR. There are also local community-run television stations such as Televisora Comunitaria del Oeste de Caracas (CatiaTVe). The Venezuelan government also runs Avila TV, Buena TV, Asamblea Nacional TV (ANTV), Agencia Bolivariana de Noticias and funds the majority of Latin American network TeleSUR.

The major Venezuelan newspapers were El Nacional, Últimas Noticias, and El Universal; all of which were private companies based in Caracas. El Nacional has been reduced to an online edition, and El Universal was sold to the Government. There are also a few regional newspapers.

== History ==
=== Democratic period ===
Venezuela was the ninth country in the world to have television, introduced in 1952 by Marcos Pérez Jiménez. By 1963 a quarter of Venezuelan households had television; a figure rising to 45% by 1969 and 85% by 1982.

By 1970s, Venezuela surpassed Argentina as the most urbanized of South America nations. The benefits that urbanization has brought in terms of ease of communication were offset by social problems.

=== Bolivarian Revolution ===
The Venezuelan media initially supported Hugo Chávez after his election in 1998, supporting the changes he proposed for Venezuela. However, when the media began to report "negative realities" occurring in Venezuela, the Chávez government began to view the independent media as an enemy. After Chávez established his position of power in Venezuela by removing political barriers, the independent media began to criticize Chávez in a similar manner to the way other Latin American countries would have their media criticize their own governments. The independent Venezuelan press then became opposed to Chávez, fearing that he would ruin the economy and Venezuela's democracy.

The Chávez government responded by making laws that would threaten the revocation or fining of media organizations, while Chávez and his officials would also combat the media by calling out reporters by name, which angered members of the media, sparking dubious reports and articles. Fears arose among the media when Chávez would call out journalists by name, with such polarization becoming so intense that eventually journalists "were regularly attacked in the street by Chavez supporters". In June 2001, the Chávez-filled Supreme Court ruled that the media could face consequences for "half-truths" and shortly after in January 2002, the headquarters of El Universal was assaulted by hundreds of Chavistas, Globovision reporters were attacked while attempting to record Aló Presidente and there was a bomb attack on newspaper Así Es la Noticia. Months later following the 2002 Venezuelan coup d'état attempt in April 2002, Chávez used a "two-pronged strategy" in which his government strengthened its own media and "closed, browbeaten or infiltrated almost every independent outlet." In 2004, the Law on Social Responsibility in Radio and Television was passed, and in 2010 it was extended to the Internet and social media in 2010, requires media companies to "establish mechanisms to restrict, without delay, the dissemination of messages."

By the time of Chávez's death in 2013, he left a transformed media atmosphere in Venezuela with the media organizations that opposed him being silenced and an expanding state media as a result. Media workers face legal barriers, defamation lawsuits from Venezuelan officials or are targets of violence. Both Chávez and his successor, Nicolás Maduro, would pressure media organizations until they failed by preventing them from acquiring necessary resources. The Venezuelan government would manipulate foreign exchange rates for media organizations so that they could no longer import their resources or fine them heavily. The government would then use a front company to give the troubled organization a "generous" offer to purchase the company. Following the buyout, the front company would promise that the staff would not change but would slowly release them and change their coverage to be in favor of the Venezuelan government.

== Television ==
Television in Venezuela began in 1952 when the dictator Marcos Pérez Jiménez launched the state channel Televisora Nacional, making Venezuela the ninth country in the world to have television. By 1963 a quarter of Venezuelan households had television; a figure rising to 45% by 1969 and 85% by 1982. Even though the best known television show internationally is President Hugo Chávez' weekly talkshow Aló Presidente, there are plenty of well known telenovelas.

The main private television networks are RCTV (launched 1953, losing its terrestrial broadcast license 2007); Venevisión (1961); Televen (1988); Globovisión (1994). State television includes Venezolana de Televisión (1964 as a private channel, nationalized in 1974), TVes (2007), ViVe (cultural network, 2003) and teleSUR (Caracas-based pan-Latin American channel sponsored by seven Latin American states, 2005). There are also local community-run television stations such as Televisora Comunitaria del Oeste de Caracas (CatiaTVe, 2001) and a range of regional networks such as Zuliana de Televisión. The Venezuelan government also provides funding to Avila TV (2006), Buena TV and Asamblea Nacional TV (ANTV, network of the National Assembly of Venezuela, 2005).

In 1998, independent television represented 88% of the 24 national television channels while the other 12% of channels were controlled by the Venezuelan government. By 2014, there were 105 national television channels with only 48 channels, or 46%, representing independent media while the Venezuelan government and the "communitarian channels" it funded accounted for 54% of channels, or the 57 remaining channels.

== Internet ==
=== Journalism ===
In an article by El Tiempo (Anzoátegui), journalists explain reasons of why they have moved from traditional media outlets such as newspapers and organizations to websites. Journalists explained how after allegations of censorship after the sale of Cadena Capriles organization and El Universal, journalists have found refuge on the Internet. Some journalists have even created their own websites, though with some difficulties. This includes a Venezuelan imitation of Naked News called Desnudando La Noticia (Stripping The News).

=== Social media ===
The use of social media has grown to be important in Venezuela because of government censorship preventing press freedom in other forms of media. Some Venezuelans rely on social networking to purchase goods, such as medications that are vital for survival. Social media has also allowed Venezuelans to protest, though the Bolivarian government has targeted critics. A September 2018 poll by Meganalisis found that 57.7% of respondents relied on social media as their news source.

== Newspapers ==
Large newspaper organizations include El Universal (Caracas) and El Nacional (Caracas). In 2014, newspapers throughout the country have reported shortages of paper and have depleted their reserves; resulting in cuts of services for customers. Despite this, the Venezuelan government has announced the creation of two new state newspapers in September 2014. In October 2014, the Vice President of The Commission of Propaganda, Agitation and Communication of the PSUV, Ernesto Villegas also announced the Venezuelan government's acquisition of Diario Vea.

In 2013, 90 newspapers were in circulation in Venezuela. Following the election of President Nicolás Maduro, 55 newspapers in Venezuela stopped circulation due to difficulties and government censorship between 2013 and 2018. By 2019, the number of newspapers circulating in Venezuela dropped to 28.

== Media freedom ==
According to Freedom House in their Freedom of the Press 2014 report, the media in Venezuela is classified as "not free". Venezuela's press freedom was also ranked low, with a ranking of 171 out of 197 countries. Freedom House explained that Venezuela's freedom of press had declined during Hugo Chávez's "15 years in power", stating that the Venezuelan government's relation to the media "led to sharp declines in press freedom and a vastly expanded government information apparatus". After the Venezuelan National Telecommunications Commission (CONATEL) implemented the Resorte Law claiming that "democratic security" was in danger and imposed heavy fines on private media, the media responded by "softening their coverage of national and international news". This law also requires all media outlets to air live government broadcasts (cadenas) "which the government issues frequently, at random, and without regard for regular programming."

Hugo Chávez presidency resulted being a continuous war against news outlets. He blamed many of them for supporting an attempted coup against him in 2002. He made changes in the broadcast side through regulations and new ownership. Maduro continued his predecessor steps by making drastic changes in the print outlets. Journalists complain and express their frustration, as they are no longer able to report freely to the news outlet. In addition, many have turned and are making use of new platforms such as internet websites and applications.

In the Annual Report of the Inter-American Commission on Human Rights 2013, the Organization of American States' Inter-American Commission on Human Rights stated that "the Penal Code of Venezuela, the Organic Code of Military Justice, and the Law on Social Responsibility in Radio, Television and Electronic Media (Resorte Law) all have sections that are not compatible with Inter-American standards on freedom of expression". They also reported that the media had been attacked by government authorities. There are reports of authorities destroying work and equipment belonging to the media, arrests and interrogations of media correspondents, reporters being held in prison being "civil rebellion" after expressing an opinion, journalists being accused of being spies and multiple reports of arrests of journalists after reporting on alleged election irregularities. Media workers have also been physically and verbally assaulted by government authorities, had received death threats against them and their families and had been intimidated by both government supporters and authorities following the death of Hugo Chávez. Cartoonists, journalists, writers and artists were sent death threats through "phone calls, text messages to their mobile telephones, and through social network Twitter". During a radio interview, Nicolás Maduro blamed Televen for violence occurring in the country after the election and accused Globovision of being "fascist". The Venezuelan government has also been accused of not allowing public media outlets to attend official events and places such as the National Assembly, where only government-run media outlets are allowed to participate.

In the World Report 2014 by Human Rights Watch, the Venezuelan government "has expanded and abused its powers to regulate media". The report says that "sharp criticism of the government is still common in several newspapers and some radio stations, fear of government reprisals has made self-censorship a serious problem". The report also criticized the amended telecommunications law where the government could take away concessions to private media outlets if it is "convenient for the interests of the nation".

In a 2015 report by the Institute for Press and Society (IPYS), over 25 media organizations had changed in ownership between 2010 and 2015 with the new owners having "a direct relationship" to local governments and the national government that was linked to Chavismo.

=== Attacks on media ===
In the Annual Report of the Inter-American Commission on Human Rights 2013, the Organization of American States' Inter-American Commission on Human Rights said that it had received information about "persistent use of stigmatizing declarations by public officials to discredit journalists, communicators, and members of the opposition who express ideas, opinions or disseminate information contrary to the interests of the Venezuelan Government". President Maduro has frequently accused the media of "psychological war", "media terrorism", being "ultra-rightwing" and "ignorant, perverse and manipulators". President Maduro had also called the newspaper El Nacional, "El Nazi–onal" and said that "[b]uying El Nacional is like buying muriatic acid and breakfasting on muriatic acid every day. That’s right, it’s poison! I don’t buy it, I don’t recommend that anyone buy it either, really; not even the people of the opposition because if they do they will make a bad impression." The Inter-American Commission on Human Rights stressed how important it was for "creating a climate of respect and tolerance for all ideas and opinions" in Venezuela.

==== During treatment of Hugo Chávez's cancer ====
Employees of Globovision filed complaints to the Public Prosecutor about "supposed threats by representatives of the Executive Branch against the media" and that "[s]tatements by senior officials constitute an official discourse that incites physical and verbal attacks on the employees of Globovisión, and guarantees impunity for the aggressors". Nicolas Maduro used harsh accusations on media organizations who were reporting on the health of Hugo Chávez calling them "ultra-rightwing", saying that they "have an absolutely wretched soul, absolutely wretched, and answer to anti-patriotic plans" and that they are "a very venomous minority of that ultra-right that never stops in its attack against President Chávez". President Maduro also accused the newspapers El Universal and El Nacional of "media terrorism" and a "psychological war". Diosdado Cabello, The President of the National Assembly, said that the private media are "the enemies of the homeland, of the people, of the Revolution, of the Constitution" and that "encouraging activities of this type because it might backfire […] and in the face of these media who are going with the ruin of the peace in this country, with the destruction of the peace of this country, I’m going to tell them: the day that something happens here, the people know what they are going to grab on to – and I’m almost certain that the rightwing media are not going to go without visits from the people. And this is not threats, I am just trying to interpret the reality of a people that is tired, that is sick and tired of being subjected and harassed, every day, to a thousand pressures by the rightwing media with their lies".

==== After the 2013 presidential elections ====
President Maduro said that the time had come for media organizations to show "who they are with […] with the homeland, with peace, with the people, or are they going to be on the side of fascism once again". President Maduro also made several verbal attacks at the time against the media saying they "are sadists of journalism and communication" and that "they celebrate [with] the feast of death".

==== 2013 Uribana jail riot ====
After the government had already announced the plans of searching a jail in Uribana, Minister of Popular Power for Penitentiary Services, Iris Varela, blamed Globovisión and El Impulso for attacks on authorities. She said, "[W]e were surprised at the announcement of the search by the privately held Globovisión network, the social networks and the webpage of newspaper El Impulso, which undoubtedly constituted a detonator for the violence, as shown by the beginning of a mutiny within the Penitentiary Center hours later, during which the gang leaders attacked members of the National Guard, resulting in an unfortunate number of casualties".

==== Releasing private information ====
In 2014, Diario Las Americas reported that the Venezuelan news website Noticias24 had sent messages to current and formal members of the Venezuelan intelligence agency SEBIN, releasing "personal records of citizens who frequent the forums portal journalistic institution with critical views about government performance Nicolas Maduro". The director of Noticias24, Frank Prada, sent screenshots of the critical comments to SEBIN and to former director and now Minister of Interior and Justice, Miguel Rodríguez Torres. It was alleged by Diario Las Americas that since the Venezuelan government knew the users IP address, they would be able to block future critical comments in the future with the "state-owned CANTV" and know the location of the user.

=== Censorship ===
The Venezuelan internet freedom declined in 2017. The country is moving towards the increase of internet censorship and the increase of online surveillance. Social media is the route protesters are taking in order to raise their concerns. This has led to the implementation of content filtering and online surveillance by the government of the country. The government justifies that the internet is used to promote hate speech.

== Alternate media ==
According to media protection organizations, Venezuelans "have been forced to find alternatives as newspapers and broadcasters struggle with state efforts to control coverage", with a growing trend of Venezuelans using online news media to bypass government censors. websites such as Informe21, El Diario de Caracas, La Patilla, Agencia Carabobeña de Noticias, and Efecto Cocuyo have emerged to counter the censorship.

Journalists and press-freedom advocates state that news websites like La Patilla "have helped fill a gap" since individuals linked to the Venezuelan government had purchased media organizations in Venezuela, such as El Universal, Globovisión and Ultimas Noticias. In an article by The Wall Street Journal discussing the rising popularity of news websites in Venezuela, La Patilla CEO Alberto Federico Ravell stated that "The editorial line of La Patilla is to call it like it is ... We don't need paper. We don't need a broadcasting license. There's little they can do to squeeze us."

The search for an alternate way of expressing their views is not lost on the new generation. According to an article published by Reuters, a group of young Venezuelan activists took it upon themselves to ride bus lines that pass through the poorest neighborhoods of Caracas and do their own kind of "news broadcasting". Claudia Lizardo, a 29-year-old creative director, formed a small team composed by four friends and began broadcasting under the name of "Bus TV" with nothing more than a cardboard frame and their voices. The group claims that the goal to be producing fact-based news media rather to seek confrontation with anybody. Laura Castillo, one member of the team, stated that "We want this to survive, that’s why we have a respectful approach that doesn’t look for confrontation with anybody."

== See also ==
- List of newspapers in Venezuela
- List of Venezuelan television channels
- List of radio stations in Venezuela
- List of journalists killed in Venezuela
- Censorship in Venezuela
- Bolivarian propaganda
- Media representation of Hugo Chávez
- Culture of Venezuela
- Music of Venezuela
- Cinema of Venezuela
