= Television in Venezuela =

Television in Venezuela began in 1952, when the then President of Venezuela, Marcos Pérez Jiménez launched the state channel Televisora Nacional, making Venezuela the ninth country in the world to have a public television network. By 1963, a quarter of Venezuelan households had television; a figure rising to 45% by 1969 and 85% by 1982. Telenovelas are popular in Venezuela, and some Venezuelan productions (such as Cara Sucia) are distributed internationally. Perhaps the best known television show internationally was President Hugo Chávez' weekly talk show Aló Presidente, which began in 1999 and ended in 2012. The government also makes regular use of cadena nacionales (mandatory interruptions on all channels to show government broadcasts).

== Channels and channel owners ==
Televisa was the second television network to begin operations in Venezuela after Televisora Nacional, and the first commercial network before Radio Caracas Televisión both in 1953. Ondas del Lago Televisión was the first Venezuelan regional television network based in Maracaibo, Zulia State. Created in 1957, lasted only a few months before ceasing operations. Actually the main private television networks are Venevisión, Televen and Globovisión. Public-owned television includes Venezolana de Televisión, TVes, ViVe and teleSUR. There are also local community-run television stations such as Catia TVe and a range of regional networks such as Zuliana de Televisión. The Venezuelan government also provides funding to Avila TV, Buena TV and Asamblea Nacional Televisión.

"Communitarian channels," funded by the Venezuelan government, are not counted as state television in figures despite relying on government funding to broadcast. "Communitarian channels technically are supposed to be independent, and many of them struggle to assert some autonomy vis-à-vis the state, but only progovernment channels receive state funding and support. Given that there are few other funding sources, communitarian channels inevitably end up complying with state directives."

Since 1980, Venezuela uses the North American analog color broadcast system NTSC and since 2009, the Japanese system with the Brazilian improvement ISDB-T.

In Venezuela, the use of CATV or satellite TV is very common and the prices are low. Inter is the leader with 430,000 subscribers (39%), followed by 400,000 DirecTV subscribers (36.5%), Net-Uno 110,000 subscribers (10%) and SuperCable 105,000 subscribers (9.5%).

As of 2023, out of nineteen over-the-air television channels, only eight are private. Low-income households with no access to subscription television are subject to Chavist propaganda on a daily basis. The shutdown of RCTV triggered a change in consumption among Venezuelans. SIBCI-owned channels are also known for rebroadcasting content from each other regularly: Vive's Corazón llanero as of July 2023 was being rebroadcast on TV FANB, TVES and VTV. Commercial TV frequently repeats old telenovelas, while production of Venezuelan telenovelas has fallen since the 2000s, though Venevisión is struggling to recover from this content drought. HD signals are introduced at a slow pace, at a time when 8K is the latest international trend.

== Programming ==
Telenovelas are popular in Venezuela, and some Venezuelan productions (such as Cara Sucia) are distributed internationally. Perhaps the best known television show internationally was however, President Hugo Chávez' weekly talk show Aló Presidente, which began in 1999 and ran with occasional breaks until 2012.

=== Community television ===
The Chávez government devoted considerable financial resources to support community television as part of its view of participatory democracy. Community television programs received funds through the National Ministry of Communication and PDVSA corporate social responsibility funds. Community programs like Catia TVe provided a forum for marginalized communities in Venezuela.

=== 2007 RCTV shutdown ===
Radio Caracas Televisión (RCTV) started broadcasting on November 15, 1953. It was the third television network to operate in Venezuela and had an important role in Venezuelan popular culture. Since the network's creation, soap operas played an important part of RCTV's programming and was part of Venezuelan culture. The programming of RCTV interpreted, reflected and described the customs of contemporary Venezuela which was evidenced by the high ratings of the network.

RCTV was highly critical of the Chávez government, as it was critical of many governments in the past, and often had allied with the opposition movement against the Bolivarian government. After threats and attacks on the station by the Venezuelan government, Hugo Chávez on May 27, 2007, shut down the station by not renewing RCTV's broadcast license which resulted in protests in Venezuela. RCTV began broadcasting via cable and satellite service providers in July 2007, as RCTV Internacional. On January 23, 2010, RCTV International did not deliver a speech by President Chávez and that same day the government asked companies, public cable and satellite operators to take RCTV International off the air. Chavez said, he would not tolerate media “at the service of coup-plotting, against the people, against the nation, against the national independence and against the dignity of the Republic.”

== See also ==
- List of television networks in Venezuela
- Media of Venezuela
- Category:Venezuelan telenovelas
