= ACN =

ACN may refer to:

== Businesses and organizations ==
=== Businesses ===
- Accenture, professional services company, listed on the NYSE as ACN
- ACN Inc., multi-level marketing company providing telecommunications and other services
- Agencia Cubana de Noticias, Cuban state news agency
- Agencia Carabobeña de Noticias, news agency, Valencia, Venezuela
- Agència Catalana de Notícies, news agency, Barcelona, Spain
- American Collectibles Network, former name for Jewelry Television, US
- Atlantis Cable News, fictional news channel on The Newsroom (American TV series)

=== Other organizations ===
- Action Congress of Nigeria, political party of Nigeria
- Agenzia per la Cybersicurezza Nazionale, Italian government cybersecurity agency, Italy
- Aid to the Church in Need, international Catholic charity based in Königstein im Taunus, Germany
- Andean Community of Nations, free trade area
- Anglican Communion Network, network of Anglican and Episcopalian dioceses and parishes

== Science and technology ==
- Acetonitrile, CH_{3}CN
- Acineta, a genus of orchid
- Acrylonitrile, CH_{2}CHCN
- Architecture for Control Networks, network protocol for theatrical control

== Sport ==
- Africa Cup of Nations, biennial football tournament
- Hockey Africa Cup of Nations, biennial field hockey tournament:
  - Men's Hockey Africa Cup of Nations
  - Women's Hockey Africa Cup of Nations

== Other uses ==
- Achang language, a Tibeto-Burman language of China
- Achnasheen railway station, UK, National Rail code
- Aircraft Classification Number, pavement load of an aircraft
- Algebraic notation (chess), the standard notation for recording chess games (Algebraic chess notation)
- ante Christum natum, seldom-used Latin equivalent of BC
- Australian Company Number, unique identifier for companies registered in Australia
- Ciudad Acuña International Airport, Coahuila, Mexico (IATA airport code ACN)
