= Catia TVe =

Venezuelan Community TV station

Televisora Comunitaria del Oeste
- Type: Broadcast Television Network
- Branding: Catia TVe
- Country: Venezuela
- Availability: Caracas (UHF channel 41)
- Owner: Community of Catia
- Key people: Ricardo Marquez, President of Catia TVe
- Launch date: March 30, 2001
- Analogue channel: 41
- Official website: CatiaTVe

Catia TVe (Televisora Comunitaria del Oeste) is a Venezuelan television channel, created and administered by the residents of Catia, a major neighborhood in the capital city of Caracas. Seventy percent of its programming is created by community organizations in the barrios (poor, heavily populated neighborhoods in Venezuela). It can be seen in the city of Caracas on UHF channel 41.

== History ==
The Hugo Chávez administration devoted considerable financial resources to support community television in Venezuela as part of its view of participatory democracy. Community television programs received funds through the National Ministry of Communication and PDVSA corporate social responsibility funds. These programs notably included Catia TVe, which provides a forum for marginalized communities in Venezuela to document and broadcast their struggles.

Catia TVe began transmission on March 30, 2001. The channel's broadcasts were suspended on April 11, 2002, during the Venezuelan coup attempt of 2002 by political opponents and Venezuelan businessmen who had ousted the president of Venezuela, Hugo Chávez for two days. Catia TVe's signal wasn't restored until July 10, 2003. Shortly thereafter the then mayor de Caracas, Alfredo Peña, ordered them to move their headquarters into a hospital in the city. It wasn't until July 11, 2004, that Catia TVe once again began broadcasting, currently reaching most of the city from their very own headquarters. On March 30, 2006, Catia TVe went from transmitting 14 hours a day to 18 hours a day because they have started showing programs from TeleSUR and important sessions of the National Assembly from Asamblea Nacional Televisión.

== See also ==
- List of Venezuelan television channels
