= Avila TV =

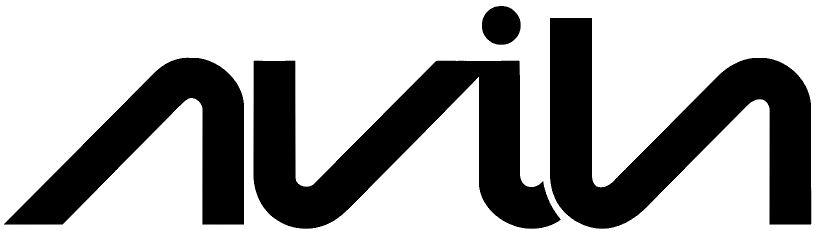
- Type: Free-to-air television network
- Broadcast area: Venezuela
- Headquarters: Caracas, Venezuela

Programming
- Language: Spanish

Ownership
- Owner: SiBCI (State-owned enterprise under administration of the Ministry of Popular Power for Communication and Information)
- Sister channels: ANTV teleSUR; VTV; ViVe; TVes; TVFANB

History
- Launched: July 6, 2006

Availability

Terrestrial
- Analog UHF: Channel 47 (Caracas)
- Digital UHF: Channel 25.3

Ávila TV is a public regional television channel based in the city of Caracas. It can be seen in the metropolitan area of Caracas on UHF channel 47 or Inter channel 89, and in the rest of the country on Digital TV channel 25.3 or CANTV TV Satelital channel 15.

== History ==
The channel was inaugurated on July 6, 2006 by then Caracas metropolitan mayor, Juan Barreto, with an investment of about 11 million bolívares fuertes ($5.1m United States dollars).

The channel was transferred to the Venezuelan Ministry of Communications and Information, MINCI, as established in the Gaceta Official Nº 39.083 date 18 December 2008, 11 days after opposition politician Antonio Ledezma assumed power as mayor of Caracas. Controversial changes in management and dismissal of employees who volunteer much of their time has caused concern among some of the collective and its audience that the staff of the national government are trying to stifle the wide-ranging critical voice the station has presented.

In December 2015, a decision was taken to re-politicize the channel and include pro-government news programs, movies and documentaries.

== Programming ==
Ávila TV has a very urban-oriented programming, mostly made by young producers that don't come from the traditional media and have not been formally educated as broadcasters. Avila also holds a school of media producers called EMPA (Escuela Metropolitana de Producción Audiovisual) where they include youngsters and other members of the public who want to learn about media production, trying to attract people from the most populated areas of Caracas. Ávila also features foreign programs from other Hispanic American countries, Spain and Japan, as well as films and documentaries. The varied programming includes both short clips or common 30-minute/1 hour long programs.

In more recent years, the channel started airing more pirated TV series and movies, going against an anti-piracy campaign initiated by Conatel. In May 2015, the channel started airing anime series, Mushishi being the first, followed by Hell Girl and Arjuna in June. As of 2025, the bulk of its programming consists of anime and western animation, including series that were previously dubbed in Venezuela.

== Current programming ==
=== Original programming ===
- ¿Dime qué escuchas?
- Son de la zona
- Sin pena ni culpa
- El coroto
- Recreándola
- Vive con cancha
- Arena presenta
- Cápsulas espaciales
- Recreo
- Paisaje sonoro
- Radio crema
- Papaya
- ¿Que hago yo aquí?

== Former programming ==
- El Aguacate
- Caracas en Directo
- La Chatarra TV
- El Cartel
- Calle Caribe
- El Matineé
- Peluos con Curita
- El Programa Mío
- Rompe la Liga
- Habitante o Ciudadano
- KolectiVoz
- Caracas Tribal
- La Brujula Sexual
- Point 47
- Donde Pisas
- La Bolita del Mundo
- Cara de Vidrio
- Onda Nuestra
- Wataca Saun
- República del Oeste
- Bipolar Idol
- R.P.T. (Rodando, Pelando y Tripeando)
- Guerra Nuestra
- Sabor Bacano
- Urbanautas
- Metalmorfosis
- El Mañanero
- Lo que sea
- El Entrompe de Falopio
- Así mismo
- La Cuadra

== See also ==
- Asamblea Nacional Televisión (ANTV)
- Buena Televisión
- teleSUR
- TVes
- Venezolana de Televisión (VTV)
- ViVe
- List of Venezuelan television channels
