= Televisora de la Fuerza Armada Nacional Bolivariana =

Venezuelan public television network

TVFANB
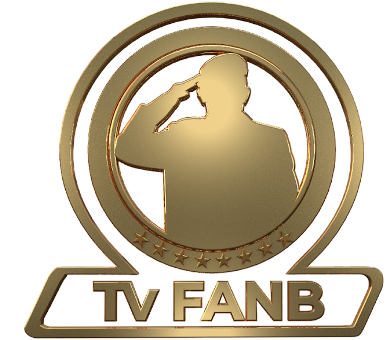
- Type: Free-to-air television network
- Country: Venezuela
- Headquarters: Caracas, Venezuela

Programming
- Language: Spanish
- Picture format: 1080i HDTV

Ownership
- Owner: SiBCI (EMCOFANB)
- Sister channels: VTV; TVes; ViVe; Avila TV

History
- Launched: December 28, 2013

Links
- Website: www.tvfanb.gob.ve

Availability

Terrestrial
- Digital UHF: Channel 25.1

Televisora de la Fuerza Armada Nacional Bolivariana (better known for its abbreviation TVFANB) is a Venezuelan over-the-air television channel, operated by the Media Company of the National Bolivarian Armed Forces of Venezuela (Empresa de Sistemas de Comunicaciones de la Fuerza Armada Nacional Bolivariana, EMCOFANB), being owned by the Venezuelan state, starting its broadcasts on December 28, 2013, its programming consists largely of programs dedicated to the National Bolivarian Armed Forces of Venezuela.

== History ==
In May 2013, Venezuelan president Nicolás Maduro ordered FANB the creation of a television channel, whose programming was to inform on the army's activities. Maduro authorized its launch on October 29, 2013. Later, the company in charge of the channel was created on November 26, 2013 by then-Minister of Defense Carmen Meléndez.

TVFANB made its official launch on December 28, 2013, on digital terrestrial television. The launch of the channel started with the national anthem. The opening speech of the channel, delivered by Maduro, criticized "capitalist programming" (such as game shows and movies) and aimed at attracting a mass audience. The channel was scheduled to be added to cable companies in January 2014. The channel took four weeks to set up its technical equipment, most of which digital, costing US$8.5 million.

In addition to its own programming, TVFANB is known for relaying programs from other SIBCI channels. A report from Spanish newspaper El País reported that, in July 2013, it was relaying Corazón llanero from Vive, a program that also aired on VTV and TVES. The channel also as of 2023 was broadcasting animes, illegally.
