= Walter Martínez (journalist) =

Venezuelan-Uruguayan journalist (1941–2026)

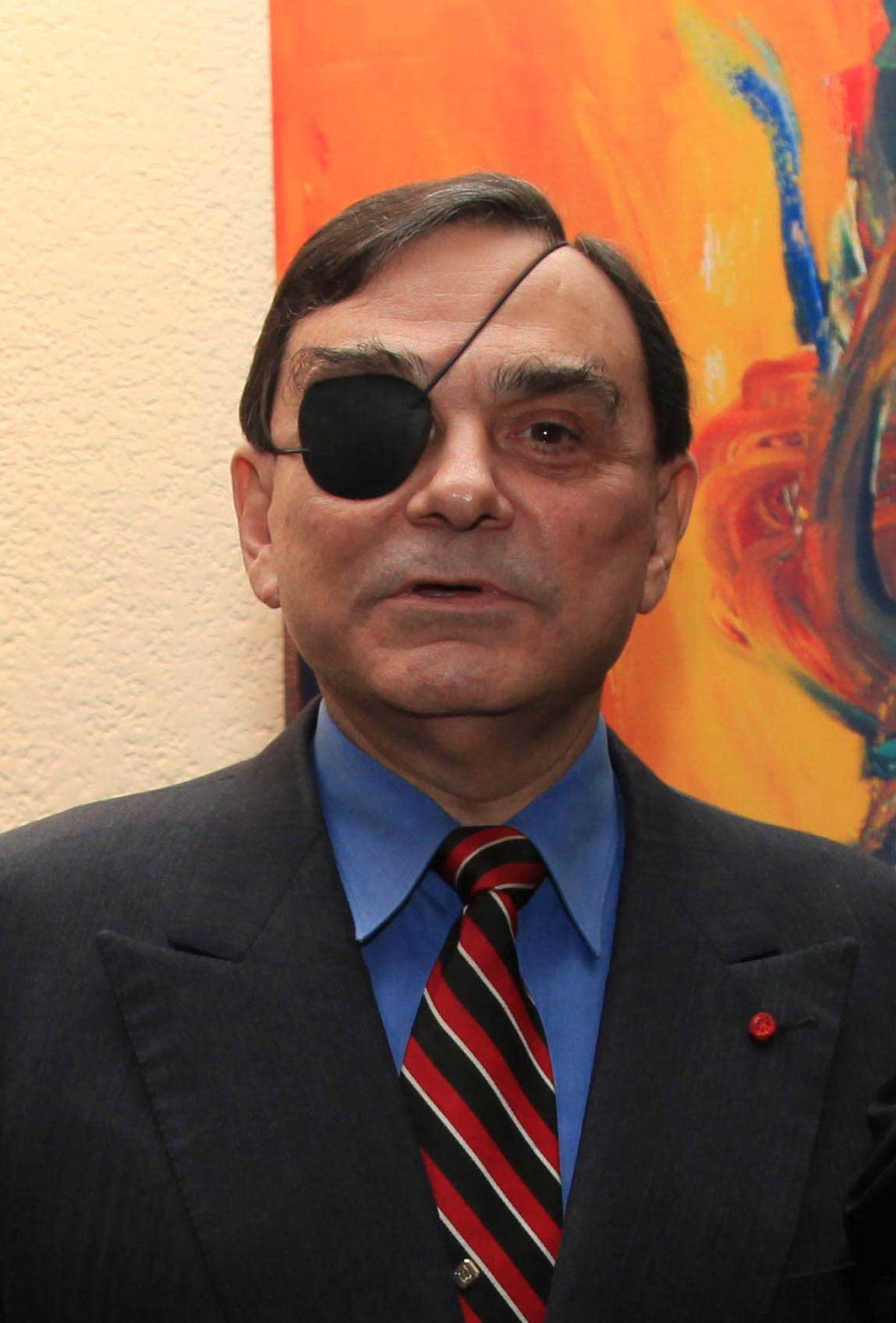
- Martínez in 2013
- Born: Walter Nelson Martínez Martínez; 6 April 1941; Montevideo, Uruguay
- Died: 22 January 2026 (aged 84); Caracas, Venezuela
- Occupation: journalist
- Spouse: Alida Sanoja Maneiro

Walter Nelson Martínez Martínez (6 April 1941 – 22 January 2026) was a Venezuelan award-winning journalist, originally from Uruguay. Martínez's career spanned over three decades in radio, television and the press. He was best known for his work in international relations, and also for using a patch in his right eye, due to a home plumbing accident.

== Career ==
Martínez was a war correspondent during the 1980s and 1990s. He worked for the Venezuelan state television channel, Venezolana de Televisión, until 2005, where he hosted and produced his one-hour-long program Dossier every night at ten. Additionally, he hosted a radio version of that program on Radio Nacional de Venezuela, also state-owned.

Dossier returned to the air on 15 September 2008 when the program was given the same time slot on Venezolana de Televisión live on weekdays at night. The program is broadcast a few hours later on TeleSUR.

Martínez is famous for the catchphrase "nuestra querida, contaminada y única nave espacial" (English: our beloved, polluted and sole spaceship), referring to planet Earth. He would begin every radio and TV address with the phrase. And "Acontecimientos en pleno desarrollo" referring to the events taking place.

In April 2016, Walter Martinez received the Felix Elmuza Medal, top award given by the Union of Journalists of Cuba (UPEC) to national and foreign professionals in the field.

== Death ==
Martínez died on 22 January 2026, at the age of 84.
