= Valores (TV program) =

- Created by: Oscar Sambrano Urdaneta
- Starring: Oscar Sambrano Urdaneta
- Country of origin: Venezuela

Production
- Running time: 30 minutes

Original release
- Network: Vale TV (2006-2008)
- Release: July 10, 2006 – 2008

Valores (Values) is a Venezuelan cultural TV program produced from July 10, 2006, until 2008, transmitted by Vale TV, and hosted by Venezuelan writer and Literary critic Oscar Sambrano Urdaneta, the main theme of this space is the learning of Venezuelan culture in all its dimensions. Was named in memory of Venezuelan writer Arturo Uslar Pietri and his TV program Valores Humanos (Human Values).

== See also ==
- Television in Venezuela
- Culture of Venezuela
- Vale TV
