= Televisora Nacional (Venezuelan TV channel) =

First television network in Venezuela

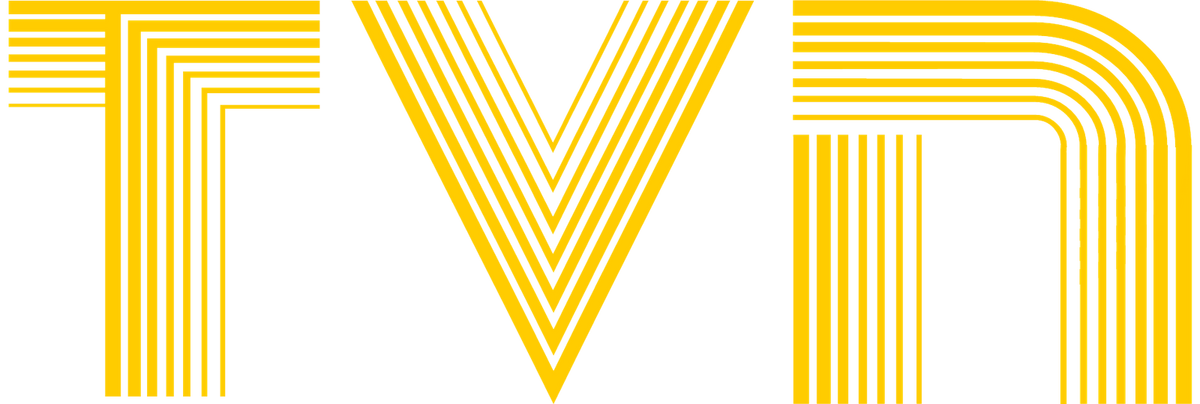
Thumb

Televisora Nacional was the first television station (state-owned) to begin operations in Venezuela. It began broadcasting in 1952, making Venezuela the ninth country in the world to have broadcast television. It ceased operation in December 1991 or January 1992.

== History ==
On 22 November 1952, the first television station in Venezuela was inaugurated: Televisora Nacional (call sign YVKA-TV), channel five, was a state-owned television station which was installed by Intelec, C.A. (Ingeniería de Telecomunicaciones, C.A.), a subsidiary of the Radio Corporation of America (RCA). It was directed by the engineers Jordan Graves and Luis Gillermo Jiménez Michelena and it relied on Venezuelan and North American professionals.

At 10:15 a.m., the first images appeared. The national coat of arms was projected, there was music (the national anthem), and then, to the surprise of many, the station went off the air. This occurred because a transmitter, which had been leased by the RCA, failed. This failure resulted in an embarrassment to the station's technicians and engineers because in the channel's headquarters, located on Marín Hill, an inaugural ceremony had been prepared. This ceremony was to be presided by Minister of Defense Colonel Marcos Pérez Jiménez and Germán Suárez Flamerich (then in charge of the governing junta), but due to the transmitter's failure, the ceremony never went on the air. Early the next morning, Televisora Nacional began airing cartoons as part of test broadcasts, which was hardly seen by anyone, and the government was furious because they had just invested 2.5 million Venezuelan bolívares for the official opening of the first television station in Venezuela.

Finally, on 1 January 1953, YVKA-TV channel 5 began transmitting its regular programming. At first, channel 5 aired in the Metro Caracas area, and for just two months was the sole station until March 4, when Televisa Channel 4 began test broadcasts. From then on, channel 5 was the country's pioneer state channel, offering news and cultural oriented programming and was the station of record for presidential inaugurations, sessions of the National Congress, and major events.

From 1 June 1980, Televisora Nacional (then VTV Red Canal 5, the name it carried from 1979 to 1982), as well as the other television networks in Venezuela, were allowed to formally transition to color broadcasting by the government of President Luis Herrera Campins.

On 3 January 1992, Televisora Nacional ceased broadcasting due to financial problems. The other Venezuelan state-owned television network, Venezolana de Televisión (VTV, channel 8), from that point on, began using Televisora Nacional's frequency, as well as its own.

On 4 December 1998, the Venezuelan government handed over the signal of channel five to the Archbishopric of Caracas, which, with the support of the leading private television networks, Radio Caracas Televisión (RCTV), Venevisión, and Televen, and other public and private institutions, launched Valores Educativos Televisión, or Vale TV.

== See also ==
- List of Venezuelan over-the-air television networks and stations
- Venezolana de Televisión
- Timeline of the introduction of television in countries
