= Vale TV =

Venezuelan Catholic TV channel

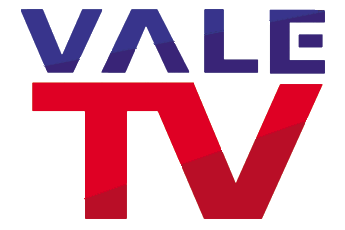
- Type: Free-to-air television network
- Country: Venezuela

Programming
- Language: Spanish
- Picture format: 480i SDTV

Ownership
- Owner: Arzobispado de Caracas
- Key people: Cardinal Jorge Liberato Urosa Savino, President Vale TV; Mons. José de la Trinidad Valera, First Vice President

History
- Launched: December 4, 1998
- Founder: Antonio Ignacio Velasco Garcia

Links
- Website: valetv.info

Availability

Terrestrial
- Analog VHF: Channel 5 (Caracas)

Vale TV (Valores Educativos Televisión) is a television channel run by Asociación Civil, a non-profit association owned by the Roman Catholic Archbishopric of Caracas (Arzobispado de Caracas), supported by the leading private television networks Radio Caracas Televisión, Venevisión, and Televen along with other public and private institutions. Created on December 4, 1998, it was founded on the principle of strengthening Venezuelan morality and cultural and educational awareness.

Vale TV's slogan is "El Mundo en un solo canal". It is seen on channel 5 in Caracas and channels 52, 10, 3, and 114 on Supercable, Intercable, Net Uno, and DirecTV, respectively. With DirecTV, it can be seen in all of Venezuela.

Vale TV shows include (since 2006) Oscar Sambrano Urdaneta's Valores.

== See also ==
- Catholic television
- Catholic television channels
- Catholic television networks
