= Pedro Berroeta Morales =

Venezuelan writer and diplomat (1914–1997)

- Born: August 30, 1914; Zaraza, Guárico, Venezuela
- Died: March 8, 1997 (aged 82); Caracas, Venezuela
- Occupations: Writer, journalist, diplomat
- Writing career
- Notable work: La salamandra (1973)
- Notable awards: Premio Internacional de Novela "Simón Bolívar" (1973); National and Municipal Narrative Prizes (1993)

Pedro Berroeta Morales (30 August 1914 – 8 March 1997) was a Venezuelan writer, journalist, and diplomat. He authored novels, short stories, poetry, essays, and biographies, and also served in the Venezuelan foreign service and as president of the state television channel Venezolana de Televisión.

== Biography ==
Berroeta was born in Zaraza, Guárico, Venezuela, on 30 August 1914, the son of Miguel Berroeta Ron, an immigrant from the Canary Islands, and Candelaria Morales. He studied in Caracas, where he graduated from the Liceo Andrés Bello, and began law studies at the Central University of Venezuela, which he abandoned in 1934 to study in Spain. After being expelled from Spain for political reasons, he moved to Paris, where he studied journalism at the École des hautes études internationales et politiques and worked in radio. During the Second World War he resided briefly in New York before returning to Venezuela, where he worked in advertising and began his career as a newspaper columnist.

He entered the Venezuelan diplomatic service in 1946, serving as cultural attaché in France and later holding posts in Switzerland, the United States, Sweden, Norway, France, and Ecuador, where he eventually acted as chargé d’affaires. In 1957 he retired from diplomacy and dedicated himself to writing and journalism. He later worked with ARS Publicidad and with CEDESA, producing scripts for documentary television series.

From 1976 to 1979 he was president of Venezolana de Televisión (Canal 8), where he hosted the programs Análisis and La entrevista de hoy. He was also a member of the board of Fundación Polar, where he helped launch the Diccionario de Historia de Venezuela.

Berroeta died in Caracas on 8 March 1997.

== Literary work ==
Berroeta wrote across multiple genres, including short stories, novels, poetry, essays, biography, and drama. His early works included the short story collection Marianik (1945) and the poetry volumes Mientras las brasas duermen (1946) and Sagrada blasfemia (1947).

His novels include:

- La leyenda del Conde Luna (1954)
- La farsa del hombre que amó a dos mujeres (1961)
- El espía que vino del cielo (1968)
- La salamandra (1973)
- Migaja (1974)
- Natacha, te quiero tanto (1986)
- La huella del pez en el agua (1994)
- A causa de Melibea (unpublished, 1997)

He also published the essay collection Cartas a José Rafael Pocaterra (1972), the biography Rómulo Betancourt: los años de aprendizaje (1987), and La última victoria del gran Mariscal (1995).

=== Style and themes ===
Critics have noted that Berroeta’s work often combined autobiographical elements with a wide range of cultural references. His fiction and essays mixed subjects from science to esotericism, and even when written in a seemingly simple style, his works contained layers of meaning accessible to more erudite readers. He himself acknowledged that he did not write for a general audience, but for a smaller group of “initiates.”

== Awards ==
Berroeta won numerous national literary prizes. Most notably, in 1973 he received the International Novel Prize "Simón Bolívar" (Premio Internacional de Novela “Simón Bolívar”) for his fantastical novel La salamandra. He was also awarded the Venezuelan National and Municipal Narrative Prizes (los premios Nacional y Municipal de narrativa) in 1993.

== Selected bibliography ==
Title	Genre	Publisher / Place	Year
Marianik	Short stories	Editorial Suma, Caracas	1945
Mientras las brasas duermen	Poetry	Berne	1946
Sagrada blasfemia	Poetry	Berne	1947
La leyenda del Conde Luna	Novel	Aguilar, Madrid–Mexico City–Buenos Aires	1956
El espía que vino del cielo	Novel	Caracas	1968
Cartas a José Rafael Pocaterra	Essays	Banco Industrial de Venezuela, Caracas	1972
La salamandra	Novel	Monte Ávila, Caracas	1973
Migaja	Novel	Monte Ávila, Caracas	1974
Natacha, te quiero tanto	Novel	Monte Ávila, Caracas	1986
Pequeño relato nocturno	Short stories	CVG / Publicaciones Seleven, Caracas	1986
Rómulo Betancourt: los años de aprendizaje (1908–1948)	Biography	Ediciones Centauro, Caracas	1987
Las mismas manos	Short stories	CVG / SIDOR, Caracas	1989
Viajando por Venezuela	Essays	Empresas Polar, Caracas	1993
La huella del pez en el agua	Novel	Planeta, Caracas	1994
La última victoria del Gran Mariscal	Essay	SIDOR / Esfera Creativa, Caracas	1995
En el nombre de Elizabeth	Biography	Planeta, Caracas	1997
