= Union of Journalists of Cuba =

The Union of Journalists of Cuba (Spanish: Unión de Periodistas de Cuba, est. 1963) is a trade association of journalists and academics in Cuba. It is a member of the Federación Latinoamericana de Periodistas.
