= TVes =

Venezuelan public television network

TVES
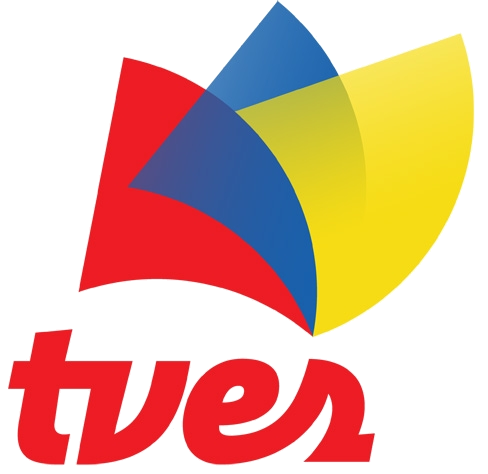
- Type: Free-to-air television network
- Country: Venezuela
- Headquarters: Caracas

Programming
- Language: Spanish
- Picture format: 1080i HDTV (downscaled to 480i for the SD feed)

Ownership
- Owner: SiBCI (Venezuelan Social Television Foundation)
- Sister channels: VTV; ViVe; Avila TV; TVFANB; Telesur

History
- Launched: May 28, 2007
- Replaced: RCTV

Links
- Website: www.tves.gob.ve

Availability

Terrestrial
- Analog VHF: Channel 2 (Caracas, listings may vary)
- Digital UHF: Channel 23.1

TVES is a Venezuelan public television channel. Its name is short for Televisora Venezolana Social (Venezuelan Social Television) and is pronounced "te ves" [ˈte ˈβes], meaning you see yourself. It replaced the signal of Radio Caracas Televisión on Channel 2 on 28 May 2007, and began broadcasting at 12:20 a.m. local time (04:20 UTC). The Venezuelan government had refused to renew RCTV's broadcasting license and instead determined to create a new channel from part of RCTV's infrastructure. The new channel, in contrast with RCTV, is public-owned. According to the government, TVes aims to portray the identity of Venezuelans, hence the pronunciation of the station's name meaning you see yourself.

== Management ==
The station is managed by the Venezuelan Social Television Foundation (Fundación Televisora Venezolana Social), a foundation established under Presidential Decree 5394, published in the Gaceta Official government gazette on 11 May 2007. The Foundation has its own funds and separate legal identity (personalidad jurídica y patrimonio propio) and is attached to the Ministry of Communications and Information. Its initial funding came entirely from the Ministry, but in future years, it will receive an allocation from the federal budget, together with such other donations and earnings it receives. The Foundation is based in Caracas but may conduct business throughout the republic and abroad.

The members of the Foundation's board were sworn in by Vice President Jorge Rodríguez on 21 May 2007. The board members are Tarik Souki Farías, Roberto Hernández Montoya, Asalia Venegas, Rafaela Cusati, María Alejandra Díaz Marín, Nelín Escalante, Amilio Ezequiel González, Jorge Morales and Manuel Fernando, with journalist and broadcaster Lil Rodríguez serving as its president. The channel launched on May 28, 2007 with the national anthem, followed by a 15-minute launch video and Por primera vez, TVes, a special concert.

As of today, the network is totally independent. and its offices and some studios are located within the building of public television network Venezolana de Television, both fully funded by the Venezuelan government. Since 2015, many of its programs have been produced from the former La Tele station studios, which the network purchased after La Tele closed down for good.

== Programming ==
TVes has planned a schedule with many different types of programming, including news, sports, movies, music, drama and children's shows. The network says that it will reflect Venezuela's social diversity and provide a forum for independent producers. In early weeks, TVes aired content from the National Geographic Channel on weekday mornings, as well as cultural programming and its own news service.

TVes director Asalia Venegas said the new network should bring Venezuelan television closer to a European model, in which the state takes an active role in education and cultural promotion, as opposed to the commercial television of U.S. capitalism.

In its first month of operation, the channel has shown a wide range of programmes from countries all around the world, including French cartoons, Brazilian puppet shows, Argentinian soaps and Soviet movies. In June 2007, TVes held its first major event as the official network of the Copa América football tournament, which is being held in the country.

Even though the station operates on a 24-hour schedule, TVes plays the national anthem 3 times a day (at 6:00 AM, noon, and midnight), as per Venezuelan laws. In July 2007, two months after the channel began broadcasting, The Economist claimed that TVes has failed to catch on with Venezuelans, with the station struggling to reach 10% of RCTV's viewers. By 2008, however, it began to challenge the other stations, becoming third overall in the ratings in 2015.

TVes also serves as the general entertainment component of a system of state TV channels, broadcasting its own dramas and variety programming.

Since 2012, TVes is the official co-national network for Olympic Games broadcasts to Venezuela.

During the Winston Vallenilla administration, the channel was reformatted to include more entertainment content, the bulk of which is pirated. In 2024, Conatel released an anti-piracy campaign broadcast on channels such as Televen and Venevisión, however the SIBCI channels are still violating these rules.

== Logos ==
2007-2010

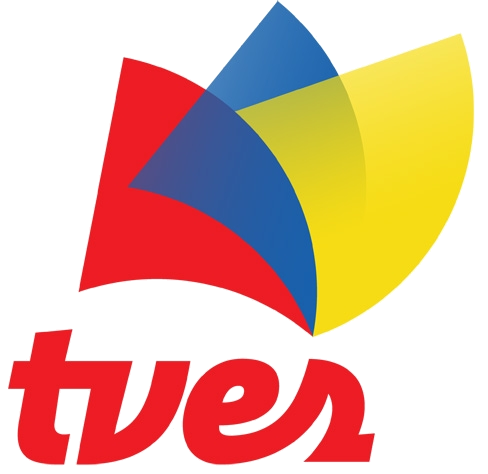
2010-2021, since 2022

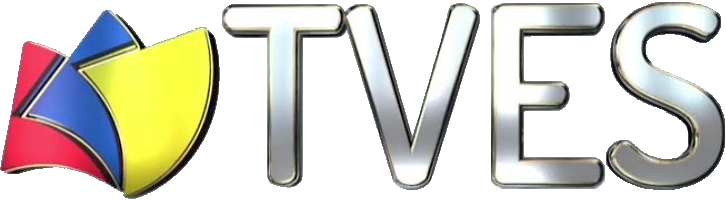
2021-2022
