= Óscar Sambrano Urdaneta =

Oscar Sambrano Urdaneta
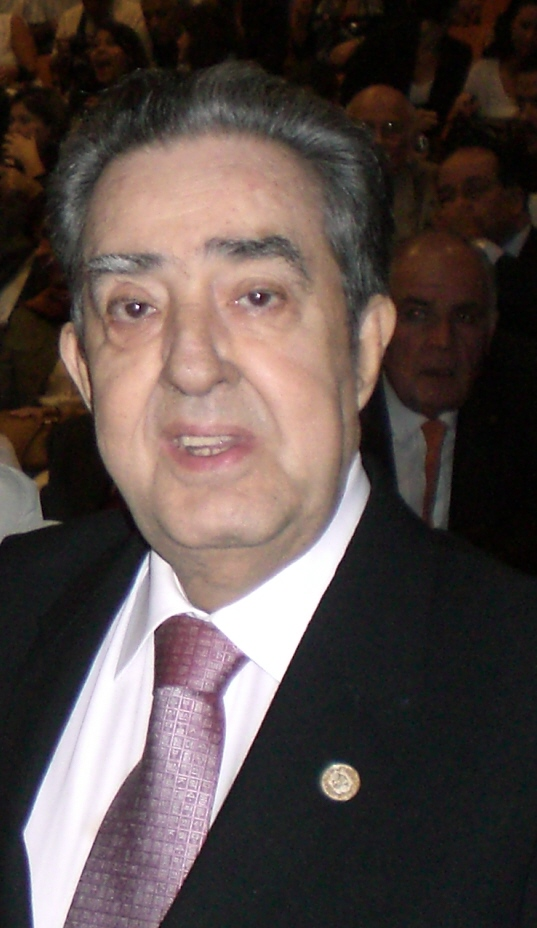
- Born: 6 February 1929; Boconó, Trujillo state
- Died: 14 June 2011 (aged 82)
- Occupations: Writer, literary critic, essayist
- Writing career
- Genres: Literary criticism, essay
- Subjects: Literature, Life and work of Andrés Bello
- Notable work: Del ser y del quehacer de Julio Garmendia

Oscar Sambrano Urdaneta (6 February 1929 – 14 June 2011) was a Venezuelan writer, essayist and literary critic, specialized in the life and work of Andrés Bello. In 1978, he won the Municipal Prize of Literature for the work Poesía contemporánea de Venezuela. He served as the president of the Venezuelan Academy of Language, is an honorary member of the Caro y Cuervo Institute, and was president of the National Council of Culture (CONAC) in the late 1990s. He also has hosted the television show Valores (Values).

== Partial bibliography ==
- Cecilio Acosta, vida y obra
- Apreciación literaria
- "El Llanero", un problema de crítica literaria
- Cronología de Andrés Bello
- El epistolario de Andrés Bello
- El Andrés Bello Universal
- Verdades y mentiras sobre Andrés Bello
- Aproximaciones a Bello
- Poesía contemporánea de Venezuela
- Literatura hispanoamericana (In collaboration with Domingo Miliani)
- Del ser y del quehacer de Julio Garmendia
