= Agencia Cubana de Noticias =

Official state news agency of Cuba

- Established: May 21, 1974
- Headquarters: Havana, Cuba
- Owner: Cuban government
- Website: www.acn.cu

Agencia Cubana de Noticias (ACN) (lit. 'Cuban News Agency') is the official state news agency of Cuba.

ACN was founded on May 21, 1974 as the Agencia de Información Nacional (AIN) (lit. 'National Information Agency'), before changing its name in November 2015. The outlet is owned and editorially controlled by the Cuban government. It primarily publishes content in Spanish, and also has translated its content to English, French and Russian.

As of 2026, the director general was Norland Rosendo. Figures published in 2015 described ACN as employing more than 120 journalists.
