= Agencia Carabobeña de Noticias =

Venezuelan news agency

Agencia Carabobeña de Noticias (ACN) / Carabobos News Agency
- Company type: Not-for-profit news agency
- Industry: News media
- Founded: Valencia (Venezuela) (2009)
- Headquarters: Valencia (Venezuela), Venezuela
- Key people: Editor-in-Chief: Daniel Ríos Mendoza
- Products: Wire service
- Website: www.ACN.com.ve

The Agencia Carabobeña de Noticias (ACN; Carabobo's News Agency) is a Venezuelan news agency, founded on September 17, 2009, by the journalist Daniel Rios Mendoza.

The center of the agency is Valencia, capital of the Carabobo State of Venezuela.
