= Televen =

Venezuelan television network

- Type: Free-to-air television network
- Country: Venezuela
- Headquarters: Sucre Municipality, Miranda, Venezuela

Programming
- Language: Spanish
- Picture format: 1080i HDTV (downscaled to 480i for the SD feed)

Ownership
- Owner: Omar Nicolas Camero Zamora

History
- Launched: July 23, 1988

Links
- Webcast: https://app.televen.com/; (available only in Venezuela)
- Website: https://www.televen.com/

Availability

Terrestrial
- Analog VHF/UHF: Channel 10 (Caracas, listings may vary)

Televen (a contraction of Televisión Venezolana and legally known as Corporación Televen C.A.) is a Venezuelan national free-to-air television network headquartered on the Horizonte neighborhood of Caracas. Televen signed on July 10, 1988, by Omar Camero Zamora. As an alternative for the two-leading-private television channels, Radio Caracas Televisión (RCTV) and Venevision, Televen distanced itself from this trend and made a different oriented programming in some cases the middle classes who do not usually watch TV and it was open and being composed of talk shows, sports, movies, a full range of series, mainly American, and Brazilian, Colombian, Mexican, and U.S. Hispanic telenovelas, and anime in the 1990s.

== History ==
On February 12, 1988, the test signal of Televen began on channel 10 in Caracas and transmitted music videos.

On July 3, 1988, Televen space that has been the history of the Venezuelan television, was shown that customers and advertisers Televen also supported the project.

On March 17, at the main offices of the National Institute of Parks of Venezuela (Inparques), representatives from Omnivisión and Televen, signed an agreement which guaranteed the environmental protection of the El Cuño hill, a place where both networks had installed antennas.

In November, the press department of Televen informed the media that their signal would go on the air in Zulia and Falcón on NTSC-M channel A13. On December 20, they expanded their signal to Guarenas and Guatire.

In 1989, Televen became the first television network in Venezuela to air nudity during prime time.

On January 18, 1989, Omar Camero Zamora, President of Televen, requested a news conference to clarify that the network had not been sold, but 33% of the company's stock had been negotiated by a group of businessmen judicially managed by Pedro Tinoco.

In March 1989, the vice-president of Production of Televen, Jorge Font, announced the acquisition of the Cedros and Macaracuay theaters by the network for the use of developing television studios in them.

With the help of investors (including Venezuelan television personality Guillermo "Fantastico" Gonzalez) in the early 1990s, Televen quickly expanded their coverage to all of Venezuela and managed to attract a larger audience share than the state-owned network, Venozolana de Televisión, but it still remained far behind RCTV and Venevision.

On February 10, 1992, in light of the suspension of constitutional guarantees as a result of the events of February 4th, Televen suspended their opinion programs.

On June 15, 1993, Televen put into service their largest antenna –a tower with the height of 150 meters, 24 transmission panels, and 30 kilowatts of power– which allowed their signal to reach all of Zulia.

In 1994, Televen started a new cycle on Venezuelan television, offering 24 uninterrupted hours of programming.

In 1996, the Camero family retook control of Televen and, thanks to the investments of their stock holders, the network expanded and began transmitting its signal digitally on Intelsat 709 satellite.

In 1997, Televen launched their webpage and later won the ANDA award in the "New Advertising Technologies" category. 8 transmitters are acquired to begin operations in cities where the signal was not received Televen: Maturin, Valle de la Pascua, Mérida, Valencia, Puerto Cabello. In other cities the existing transmitters are upgraded: Caracas, Coro, Central Coast, Maracaibo, Maracay, Puerto Ordaz, Puerto La Cruz and Margarita.

In 1998 the channel celebrated its first decade. It began transmitting its signal with the highest technology via satellite "Intelsat 806". It acquired and began to remodel a building to install its new headquarters to a larger space, able to support its growth. That year, they began to see the fruits of a successful policy direction and programming.

In 2004, Televen began producing more shows and restructured their prime time schedule.

Televen has been known to occasionally export some of their programs overseas. One of these was Chamokropolis, which was similar to a show that Televen also aired, called Nubeluz, which came from Peru.

Televen, along with Venevisión, successfully got the rights to broadcasting Venezuelan national baseball games from RCTV and received the right to broadcast baseball games from U.S. Major League Baseball.

Televen once aired TV series like CSI, The Simpsons (Los Simpson), Law & Order (La Ley y El Orden) and Baywatch (Guardianes de la Bahia).

== Headquarters ==
Thus, with an investment of 22 million dollars and the strong will of its shareholders, its human resources, customers and advertisers, Televen achieved its objectives.

In 1999, Televen showed a growth of 100%. With the latest technology, its signal covers the entire country. In 2000, significant investments were made which drove the growth of the channel, both domestically and internationally.

With technological innovations, framed at the beginning of a new century, Televen met one of the most important goals in its history. The new headquarters, planned building entirely with digital technology, becoming the country's most modern building in terms of TV systems are concerned.

== Criticism ==
Televen was neutral in their political views until the arrival of Hugo Chávez, when it became a critic of the government. After the 2004 recall referendum, Televen has attempted to return to its neutral status by cancelling the political opinion program hosted by journalist Marta Colomina, who is a fierce critic of the government. Due to the decline of advertisement prices in television because of the two-month-long general strike, it has forced the network (along with some of its national and regional competitors) to lose some of their independence by accepting advertising from the Brazilian sect Universal Church of the Kingdom of God.

In 2005, Televen presented evidence to the Venezuelan courts of an alleged deal involving advertising costs between its principal competitors, RCTV and Venevisión.

Because Televen decided to become neutral, many in the Venezuelan Opposition and Anti-Chávez groups criticized Televen of submitting to Chávez. Opposition criticism increased against Televen during the closure of RCTV. Many in the opposition criticized Televen of not supporting freedom of speech because Televen, and its rival Venevisión did not speak out against the closure of RCTV. Many view Televen secretly supported the closure since it would make it the second most watched television network, originally it was third after Venevisión (second most watched) and RCTV (the most watched channel). By 2010, Televen became the most watched TV network in Venezuela, beating Venevision and the state TV channels (VTV, TVes and ViVe). Telemundo's soap opera Más Sabe el Diablo is the most watched serial in the country.

== News and broadcasts ==
El Noticiero Televen (The Televen Newscast) is the current newscast of Televen. It is broadcast four times a day (6:00 AM, 8:00 AM, 12:00 PM and 10:00 PM), except for Sundays, when it only comes on during important events such as elections.
