= Latin American Federation of Journalists =

- Federación Latinoamericana de Periodistas
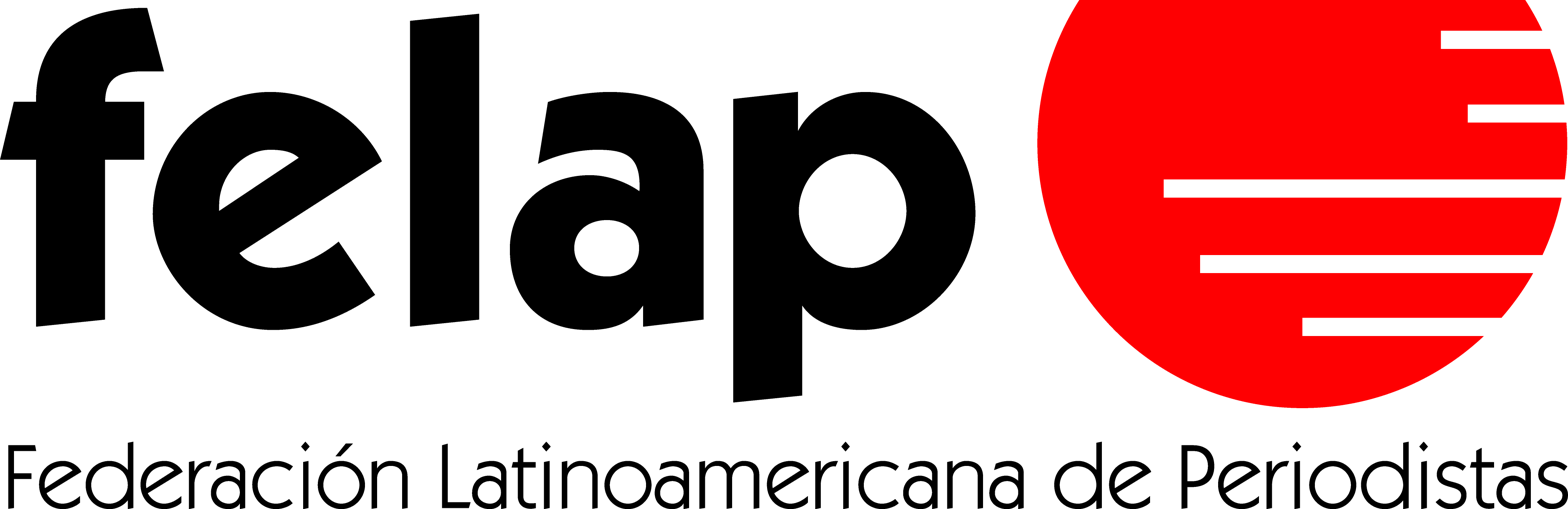
- Abbreviation: FELAP
- Formation: June 7, 1976; 49 years ago
- Headquarters: Nuevo León # 144 interior 101, Colonia Hipódromo Condesa CP 06170, Mexico City, Mexico
- Website: www.felap.org

The Latin American Federation of Journalists (Spanish: Federación Latinoamericana de Periodistas, FELAP), founded on June 7, 1976, is an association that represents journalism organizations—federations, unions, circles, and schools—in Latin America and the Caribbean, representing more than 80,000 journalists in the region as of 2012.

== Background ==
Its founding president was Eleazar Díaz Rangel, of Venezuela, and its founding general secretary was Genaro Carnero Checa, of Peru.

FELAP also serves as an umbrella for more than 50 associated institutions that are involved in the study and practice of communication and journalism, such as research centers, journalism schools, specialized libraries, news agencies, and publications. At the request of FELAP and the International Federation of Journalists, in 1991 the Commission for the Investigation of Attacks Against Journalists was founded as a regional body working to ensure the safety of FELAP members.

In addition to its official website, FELAP has published articles on the website of the Voltaire Network. It is associated with UNESCO as a nongovernmental organization. It has worked in collaboration with many organizations, including the Argentine Media Observatory, the Union of Journalists of Buenos Aires, the Puerto Rico Journalists Association, the Chilean College of Journalists, the Brazilian National Federation of Journalists, the Federation of Associations of Mexican Journalists, and Democracy Now. Representatives from FELAP have served on the jury for the Miguel de Cervantes Prize.

== See also ==
- International Press Institute
