= ViVe =

Venezuelan national TV channel

- Logo used since 2026
- Country: Venezuela
- Broadcast area: Venezuela
- Headquarters: Caracas, Venezuela

Programming
- Picture format: 1080i HDTV (downscaled to 480i for the SD feed)

Ownership
- Owner: SiBCI/COVETEL (State-owned enterprise under administration of the Ministry of Popular Power for Education)
- Sister channels: ANTV; Avila TV teleSUR; TVes; VTV

History
- Launched: November 11, 2003

Availability

Terrestrial
- Analog UHF: Channel 43 (Caracas, listings may vary)
- Digital UHF: Channel 25.1

ViVe (Visión Venezuela) is a Venezuelan national public television channel funded by the government. It was inaugurated in 2003. As of 2015, the channel operated six regional offices across the country, in addition to its headquarters in Caracas.

== History ==
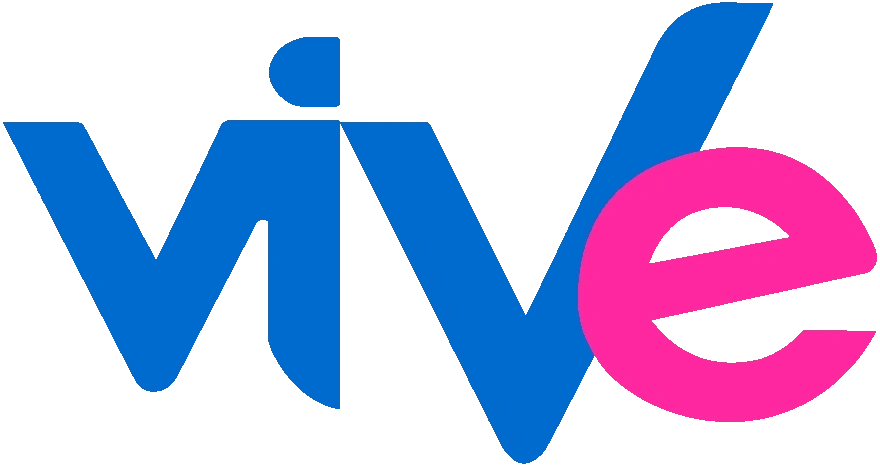
ViVe former logo until 2026.

On November 11, 2003, former Venezuelan president Hugo Chávez inaugurated ViVe TV at the National Library in Caracas. Following its launch on ultra high frequency (UHF) channel 24, Chávez described the event as significant and referred to it as part of a broader struggle over media influence in Venezuela, criticizing what he called "media dictatorship" at the national and international level.

In 2018, Jorge Amorín was appointed president of ViVe TV by the Ministry of Popular Power for Communication and Information.

In 2020, Venezuelan president Nicolás Maduro announced that ViVe TV would be transferred to the Ministry of Education for use as the central television channel supporting the completion of the school year during the COVID-19 quarantine.
