= Aló Presidente =

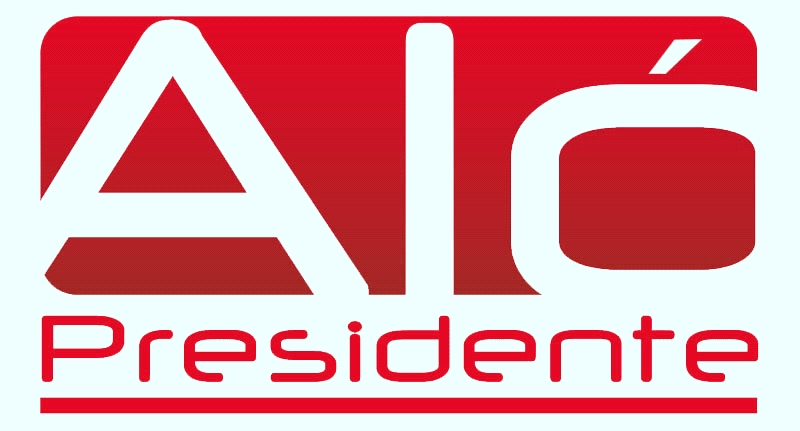
- Genre: Talk show
- Presented by: Hugo Chávez
- Starring: Hugo Chávez
- Country of origin: Venezuela
- Original language: Spanish

Production
- Production location: Caracas

Original release
- Network: Venezolana de Televisión
- Release: 23 May 1999 – 29 January 2012

Related
- Contacto con Maduro

Aló Presidente (English: Hello, Mr. President) was a long-running, unscripted talk show hosted by Hugo Chávez, former President of Venezuela. It was broadcast on Venezuelan state television and radio channels, including Venezolana de Televisión, on Sundays from 11:00am until mid/late afternoon. The show was used to promote Chavista socialist principles to supporters in Venezuela and beyond. Many editions were filmed outdoors before large audiences, commonly featuring a local farm, factory, school, hospital, housing project or other public investment. Although Chávez typically appeared on television several times a week, Aló Presidente was his opportunity to reach most families on their day off.

The show was criticized for its lack of seriousness, due to low production values, spontaneous announcements, random contributions from audience members, colorful informality and often outright tedium. Live footage of Aló Presidente would occasionally be broadcast simultaneously across all state and private television and radio in Venezuela, for any period determined by Chávez during the broadcast.

== History ==
Beginning in 1999, Aló Presidente was a 1-hour show designed to give citizens a voice and put them in direct contact with Chávez. It was first broadcast on radio on May 23, 1999, about three months after Chávez took office. The show did not air between June 5, 2011, and January 8, 2012, while Chávez was receiving cancer treatment in Cuba. A total of 378 shows aired.

In 2007, Chávez took his desk to the beach and recorded a 7-hour episode including his views on what he called European imperialism in the Malvinas. During the March 2, 2008 airing, Chávez ordered a general to send ten battalions of troops to the border with Colombia in response to a bombing by Colombian forces inside Ecuador which killed Raúl Reyes, a FARC leader. The battalions were ultimately not deployed, but the declaration may have caused the 2008 Andean diplomatic crisis. Chávez spent a large amount of time on the show denouncing capitalism, imperialism and foreign interference.

When segments were broadcast as a cadena nacional, citizens were compelled to either listen in or turn off their TVs or radios. Many Venezuelans tuned in because Chávez was known for unveiling financial assistance packages or other social benefits. The show promoted the Bolivarian Revolution and allied governments, blaming Venezuela's economic and other problems principally on the United States, but also on internal economic and political enemies. George W. Bush was referred to as "Míster Danger", the villain character in a famous Venezuelan novel, Doña Bárbara.

== Format ==
The format of the show changed over time. At first, it was mainly a call-in show in which Venezuelans expressed grievances and discussed politics with Chávez. Over time, Chávez became the attraction, serving as teacher, interrogator, entertainer and motivator. The show's content broadened to topics as diverse as geography, history, philosophy and pedagogy. Musical performances became common as the years went on. Chávez usually broadcast from a new location each week.

Government ministers were often required to attend in person. They could be questioned by the president about anything, and sometimes policy — even military policy — was apparently decided live on the show. Another topic the show frequently used to discuss was U.S. foreign policy. Once, the show sent an interviewer out into the streets, stopping passers-by at random to ask if they watched the show; without fail, they all said they did.

== Style ==
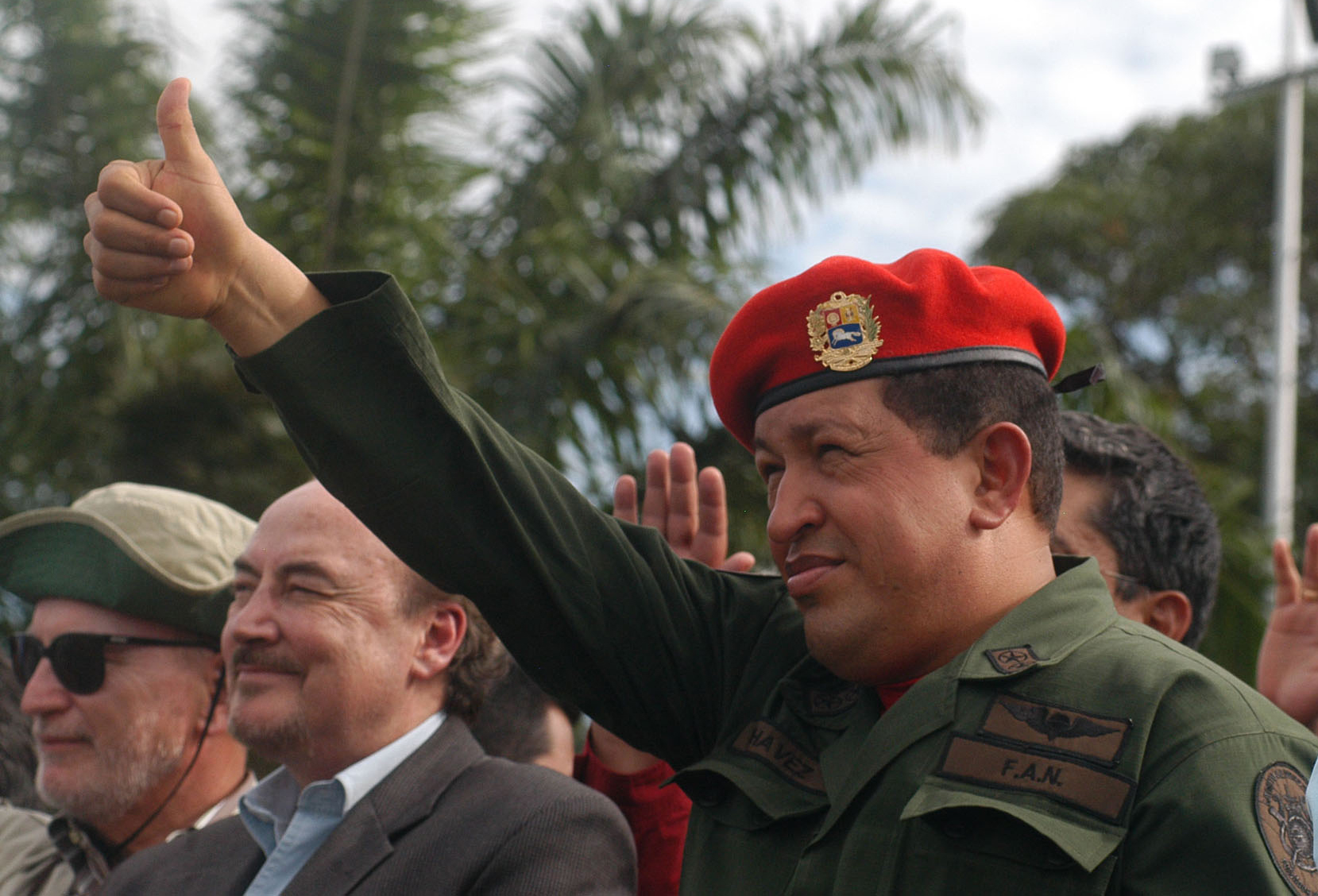
Chávez was commonly dressed in politically affiliated clothing in public and on television

Rachel Nolan of The New York Times described the show as looking "for all the world like a 'Daily Show' parody" because of its "cheap" and "quirky" opening titles: a ribbon in the colors of the Venezuelan flag unfurls with a drum roll before the title appears on screen, followed by a trumpet call with dramatic block letters showing the words "humanity," "struggle," and "socialism." Nolan also notes the political imagery of Chávez' appearance in the title sequences; he was commonly dressed in a bold red shirt or in military uniform, often wearing a Che Guevara beret, and being swarmed by supporters.

Chávez also had a catchphrase on the show, akin to Donald Trump's "You're fired!" from The Apprentice. Chávez was commonly filmed expropriating property owned by rich people, which he dramatized by pointing at the building and shouting "¡Exprópiese!".

== Influence ==
Aló Presidente spawned similar programs by leaders in other Latin American countries, including Bolivia, Ecuador, and El Salvador, led by presidents Evo Morales, Rafael Correa, and Mauricio Funes respectively. Some of these leaders had previously been featured on Aló Presidente. A later similar program, created by Paraguayan president Mario Abdo Benítez in September 2019, was delivered via WhatsApp. Despite the international copies, Nolan opined that "with the exception of the logorrheic Fidel Castro, it's hard to imagine another political figure with the combination of manic exhibitionism and entertainer's stamina required to star in this sort of show".

It was suggested by historian Enrique Krauze that the show was somewhat enjoyed by Venezuelans because it gave them "at least the appearance of contact with power, through [Chávez'] verbal and visual presence, which may be welcomed by people who have spent most of their lives being ignored."

== See also ==
- Cadena nacional
