= Venezolana de Televisión =

Venezuelan state-run public TV channel

- Type: Free-to-air television network
- Country: Venezuela
- Headquarters: Sucre Municipality, Miranda, Venezuela

Programming
- Language: Spanish
- Picture format: HDTV 1080i (downscaled to 480i for the SD feed)

Ownership
- Owner: SiBCI (State-owned enterprise under administration of the Ministry of Popular Power for Communication and Information)
- Sister channels: ANTV; Avila TV; Telesur; ViVe; TVes; Colombeia; ShowVen TV; TVFANB; ConCiencia TV; 123TV

History
- Launched: August 1, 1964; 62 years ago

Links
- Website: vtv.com.ve

Availability

Terrestrial
- Analog VHF: Channel 8 (listings may vary)
- Digital UHF: Channel 22.1

Venezolana de Televisión (Spanish for: Venezuelan Television and shortened as VTV) is a state-run television channel based in Caracas, Venezuela, which can be seen throughout the capital and surrounding areas on channel 8. Programs that can be seen on VTV included Aló Presidente and Telesur Noticias.

VTV has produced a number of telenovelas, including titles such as Ifigenia, Doña Perfecta, 1810 and La Dueña. 1984's La Dueña was perhaps its most successful and popular production.

During the Bolivarian government, VTV has been used by the government to campaign against Venezuela's opposition and Venezuela's privately owned media, with about 75% of its programming transmitted to Venezuelans consisted of Bolivarian propaganda. In 2004, VTV produced another telenovela, Amores de Barrio Adentro, but it was only seen once a week and lasted only a few months. In August 2014, VTV celebrated its 50th anniversary.

== History ==
=== Private channel (1964–1974) ===
Cadena Venezolana de Televisión (CVTV) was inaugurated as a privately owned television station on August 1, 1964, at 7:30 p.m. President Raúl Leoni was chosen to be the one to cut the ribbon. Despite its name, however, it was not a nationwide television network at first, broadcasting in the Caracas area during its first years. Only in the late 1960s did the channel become a national network with the opening of stations in major cities nationwide, and became the first network to produce and broadcast a color program in 1971.

The first logo of VTV thus was the company name (CVTV) on a number 8 (reflecting its channel number in Caracas).

=== State channel (1974-1999) ===
In September 1974, CVTV, after prolonged financial problems due to its competition with the better-established privately owned television networks in Venezuela, Radio Caracas Televisión and Venevisión, was purchased by the Venezuelan government and rebranded as Venezolana de Televisión (VTV). Between 1974 and 1980, VTV was funded in whole by the government, but due to an internal economic crisis, VTV was forced to air advertisements for extra revenue (this has no longer been occurring since Hugo Chávez became president in 1999). It now only broadcasts program previews and government ads instead.

After June 1, 1979, VTV, as well as the other television networks in Venezuela, were allowed, by the government of President Luis Herrera Campins, to transmit completely in color using the NTSC-M system. By 1980, the transition was complete, and VTV was then rebranded as the VTV Network (VTV Red) until 1982, together with Televisora Nacional, the other state-owned television channel in Venezuela and the first television station to be established, thus briefly uniting channels 5 and 8 into one national network.

In 1990, VTV, after a government decision to close the Televisora Nacional due to the economic situation of the country, merged it with the latter and thus began simulcasting on channel 5, system M, color NTSC (starting midday). This simulcast lasted until December 4, 1998, when the government handed over the signal of channel five to the Archbishopric of Caracas, which gave birth to Vale TV.

In 1999, VTV used a logo identical to the nicknamed "Exploding Pizza" ident used by the Canadian Broadcasting Corporation.

=== Decade of 2000s ===
In 2002, the channel temporarily closed its headquarters due to the 2002 coup d'état but reopened a few days later. In 2007, it broadcast the special "Por primera vez TVes" alongside TVes, following the latter's launch after the Hugo Chávez administration shut down RCTV.

From November 2008 until 2015—when it moved to the former offices of La Tele—the channel shared its headquarters in the Los Ruices neighborhood with TVes. In 2013, VTV launched a high-definition signal exclusively for digital terrestrial television (DTT).

By 2014, became the first Latin American station to broadcast Russia's RT Actualidad's newscast.

=== Decade of 2020s ===
On December 1, 2021, the channel began broadcasting the animated Bolivarian propaganda series Súper Bigote, which portrays Nicolás Maduro as a superhero fighting against U.S. imperialism and the opposition to his government. The animated series is criticized for being considered a form of cult of personality, despite supporters of Madurism denying these accusations.

On April 12, 2022, Venezolana de Televisión launched its streaming platform, "VTV IP," making programs, series, and movies available to users on an "on-demand" basis, alongside the channel's live broadcast via the link canal8.com.ve. which he held until 2026.

In the early hours of July 26—two days before the 2024 Venezuelan presidential election—VTV switched its broadcast signal to a 16:9 aspect ratio, although some programs and nationwide broadcasts are still aired in 4:3. Following the capture of Nicolás Maduro and Cilia Flores on January 3, 2026, and the ascent of Delcy Rodríguez to the Venezuelan presidency in an acting capacity, the channel's programming underwent changes, including the return of sports broadcasts such as the Venezuelan Basketball Super League and the Liga Futve.

On August 31, 2026, at 9:00 p.m., the channel premiered a talk and interview show titled "Con Silva de noche," hosted by Henrys Silva (a former Venevisión presenter). The program was launched with the aim of "bringing back freshness and wholesome entertainment," featuring well-known figures from Venezuelan television, such as Wilmer Ramírez, as guests.

== Politics ==
VTV has several times been targeted during coup attempts. VTV was a target in the 27 November 1992 coup attempt. Military officers, in rebellion against President Carlos Andrés Pérez, attacked the station, and ten station employees were killed.

=== Bolivarian government ===
Under the Bolivarian government, VTV has been used by the government as an instrument to campaign against Venezuela's opposition and Venezuela's privately owned media with about 75% of its programming transmitted to Venezuelans consisted of Bolivarian propaganda. On the evening of the 11 April 2002 coup attempt against Chávez, Enrique Mendoza, then governor of Venezuela's Miranda State, while being interviewed by Venevisión announced "a esa basura de canal la vamos a cerrar" ("We are going to shut down that trashy channel"), referring to VTV. Hours later, the Miranda state police occupied VTV and forced it off the air. It remained off the air until April 14, 2002, when Chávez was returned to power.

During the Venezuelan general strike of 2002–03, VTV would share ads depicting Venezuelans waiting in line for gas canisters with a voice saying "The opposition unleashed terrorism on the Venezuelan people and it led to hunger and unemployment. Thanks to the new PDVSA, PDVSA is for all of us, all of us are PDVSA". VTV would also alter images of pro-government rallies to make them appear larger and used outdated videos to attack opposition members or former supporters. In February 2004, the president of state television station Venezolana de Television (VTV) stated that VTV was not a state television station but a station of President Chávez's political party. VTV aired ads showing the September 11 attacks, comparing them to the opposition stating "The people know who the terrorists are". In 2005, the program Dossier was cancelled after its host and producer, Walter Martinez, accused the government of corruption.

== Slogan ==
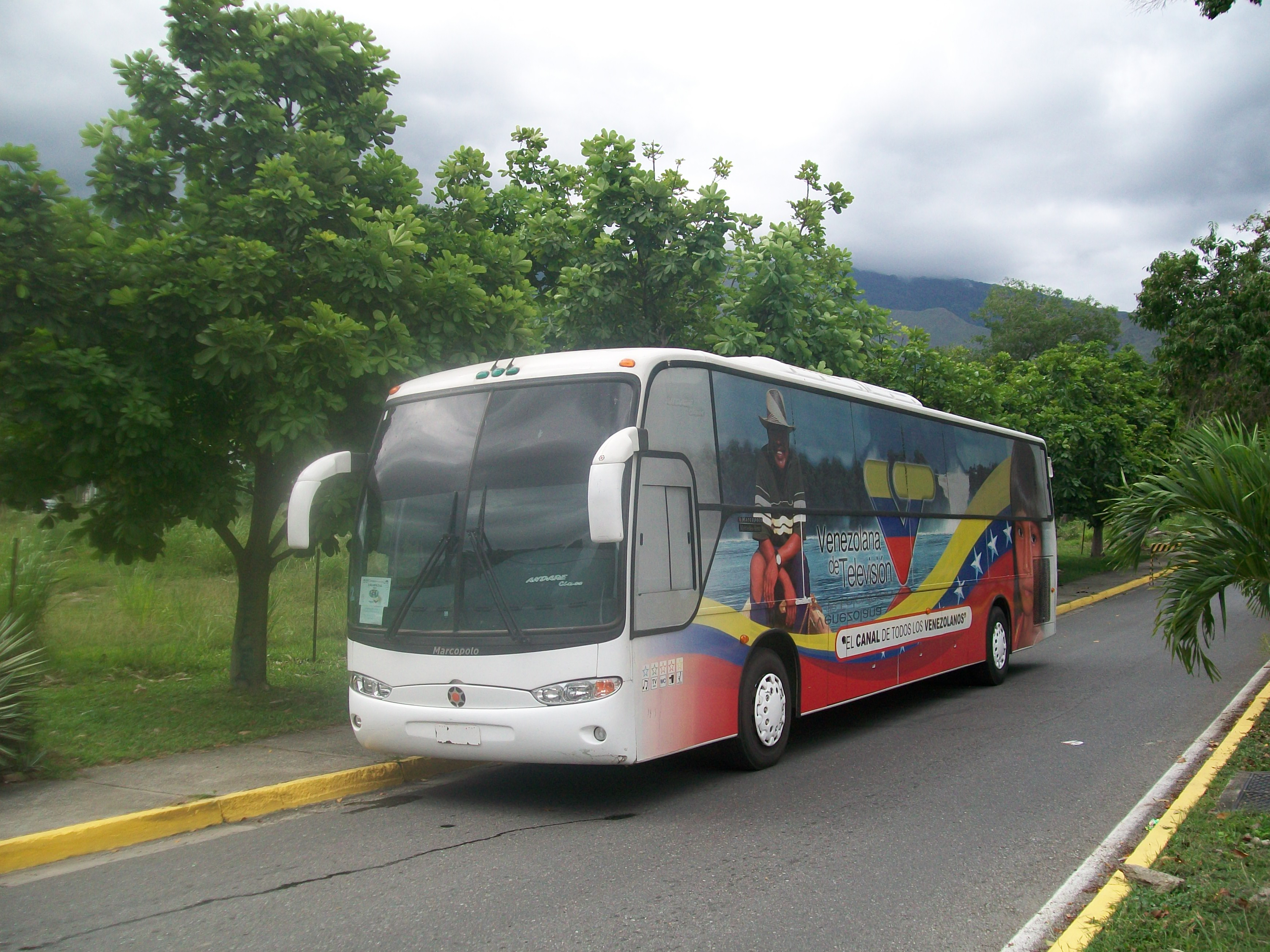
Coach bus operated by VTV bearing the channel's logo: “El Canal de todos los Venezolanos”.

VTV's slogan is "El Canal de todos los Venezolanos", or "The channel of all Venezuelans". It had changed temporarily to "Desde adentro", or "From inside" but it has since been changed back.

== Presidency ==
VTV's current president is Jesús Romero Anselmi. Former VTV presidents include Vladimir Villegas (who is the brother of Ernesto Villegas), Andrés Izarra, Blanca Eeckout, Maripili Hernández, and back in the 1980s and 1990, journalist Marta Colomina and Napoleon Bravo. Pedro Berroeta Morales was its president from 1976 to 1979.

Jesús Romero Anselmi was the president of VTV before Vladimir Villegas became its president in 2002. In 2005, Romero Anselmi returned to the presidency of VTV. During Rafael Caldera's second term as president, there were plans to privatize VTV. It failed when it was realized that VTV would probably not be profitable.
