= Buena Televisión =

Buena Television
- Type: Broadcast television network
- Branding: Buena TV
- Country: Venezuela
- Availability: Tachira State, Venezuela
- Owner: Tachira State Government; State-Owned Enterprise
- Key people: Willian Lara, Minister of Communication & Information; Ronald Blanco La Cruz, Former Governor of Tachira, Buena TV President
- Launch date: August 1, 2006
- Analogue channel: 59

Buena Television (also known as Buena TV) is a Venezuelan regional television station that can be seen by those who live in the Tachira State.

== History ==
Buena TV was inaugurated on August 1, 2006, by its founder, the then governor of the Tachira State Ronald Blanco La Cruz.
