= Asamblea Nacional Televisión =

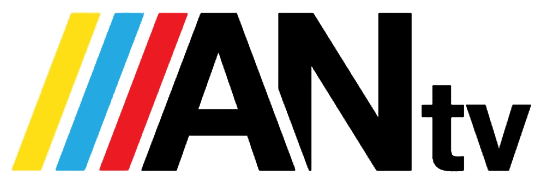
- Asamblea Nacional Televisión logo since April 2016.
- Country: Venezuela
- Broadcast area: National
- Headquarters: Caracas

Ownership
- Owner: National Assembly of Venezuela

History
- Launched: February 17, 2005
- Closed: 2016

Links
- Website: http://www.antv.gob.ve (in Spanish)

Availability

Terrestrial
- Caracas: 62 (UHF)

Asamblea Nacional Televisión (ANTV) was the television station of the National Assembly of Venezuela. It was created in 2005 to cover the proceedings of Venezuela's National Assembly. Their goal is to increase the participation of Venezuelan citizens in the legislative debates. The signal was seen by those with a cable or satellite subscription in Venezuela, under the name Fundación Audiovisual Nacional de Televisión, that it's not the current National Assembly channel; therefore, the Assembly broadcasts their sessions in a YouTube channel also called ANTV.

== History ==
Current Venezuelan president (Note: A number of countries have questioned his victory in the 2024 Venezuelan presidential election.) Nicolás Maduro claimed credit for creating ANTV, while he served as president of the National Assembly from 5 January 2005 to 7 August 2006.

The Grupo de Boston, a group integrated by Venezuelan and American Congresspeoples, proposed the creation of ANTV in 2003. Afterward, the topic was analyzed by a consensus between supporters and opponents of then-President Hugo Chávez. The United States Congress offered to support the proposal with equipment, but that never happened. Due to many debates and arguments in the Venezuelan National Assembly, the approval for the creation of ANTV took over a year. It began broadcasting February 17, 2005.

ANTV is a non-profit organization, whose resources come from the Legislative branch of Venezuela and national and international donations.

Maduro claims that the objectives of this channel are to develop the basic requirements of the Constitution. "It's at the service to promote new democratic values in Venezuela and to build a new era of participation by the citizens. Revolution is when people are well informed, come up with their own conclusions, and participate in the political life of the country".

The two goals of Nicolás Maduro for ANTV was to be an over-the-air television network and for people to interact with it. Since last quarter of 2006 it started broadcasting in Caracas on UHF channel 62.

In the first semester of 2005, CONATEL gave the approval for ANTV to be seen without the necessity of it being affiliated with DirecTV, NetUno, Supercable and Intercable.

Maduro also hopes that an interactive forum is set up, so that citizens finally can make their recommendations on any proposed law over the internet or by telephone; it is considered that technological advances will help in this area.

Since 2010 until January 2016, it was the only television channel authorised to broadcast the National Assembly sessions. The other media had to connect with ANTV in case of a simulcast.

=== Liquidation ===
On 8 December 2015, then-President of the National Assembly, Diosdado Cabello, reported that the ANTV signal concession would be given to the channel's workers. On 10 December 2015, it was approved by the deputies of the PSUV the transfer of ANTV and AN Radio (its sister radio station) to their employees. On that day they also approved 400 million bolívares for the operation of the television and radio of the National Assembly for 2016. The change of administration was generated as a consequence of the results of the parliamentary elections in Venezuela in 2015 and statements of deputy Henry Ramos Allup. However, some experts say that besides confusing, the transfer is illegal.

On 31 December 2015 it was reported that the channel would change its name to National Audiovisual Television Foundation ANTV (Fundación Audiovisual Nacional de Televisión ANTV). The channel workers assumed operational and administrative functions of the channel from 1 January 2016. On 31 December 2015, the channel stopped broadcasting signal itself instead to repeat the signal of Venezolana de Televisión.

On January 4, 2016 there were complaints from several employees of mass layoffs channel and loss of equipment. The ANTV Foundation has argued that no layoffs had happened because the former ANTV was liquidated and the new channel had not yet begun. ANTV Foundation also has denied the theft of equipment.

=== Substitution ===
On 15 January 2016, the signal of Audiovisual Foundation National Television ANTV channel began the broadcasts that replaced Asamblea Nacional Televisión. Also, on February 2, 2016, a version of ANTV was launched with the official beginning of the National Assembly sessions; this would be broadcast via streaming through YouTube, but would not be (so far) a television channel.
