= Telesur =

Public television network in Venezuela

- Type: Free-to-air television network
- Broadcast area: Americas; Europe; Africa
- Affiliates: Venezolana de Televisión; Cubavision International; Canal 4 (Nicaragua)
- Headquarters: Sucre Municipality, Miranda, Venezuela

Programming
- Languages: Spanish; English
- Picture format: 1080i HDTV (downscaled to 480i/576i for the SDTV feed)

Ownership
- Owner: SiBCI (Governments of Venezuela, Cuba and Nicaragua)

History
- Launched: 24 July 2005; 21 years ago

Links
- Website: www.telesurtv.net (in Spanish); www.telesurenglish.net (in English)

Availability

Terrestrial
- Analog UHF (Venezuela): Channel 51 (Caracas, listings may vary)
- Digital UHF (Venezuela): Channel 22.2

Telesur (stylized as teleSUR) is a Latin American terrestrial and satellite news television network headquartered in Caracas, Venezuela, and sponsored by the governments of Venezuela, Cuba and Nicaragua.

First proposed in 2003 by Tariq Ali and subsidized by Venezuela, Telesur was launched under the government of Hugo Chávez, and promoted as "a Latin socialist answer to CNN". It has been described as a network showcasing the diversity of Latin America and a propaganda outlet for state views under chavismo.

In Latin America, teleSUR can be seen in Argentina, Colombia, Chile, Ecuador, Peru, Uruguay and other territories as Aruba, Trinidad and Tobago, Barbados and Curaçao in DirecTV's package (channels 292 and 722). In 2020, Uruguay removed its sponsorship.

In 2020, the company received the Order of Francisco de Miranda.

== History ==
The proposed alternative Latin American television network that would become Telesur took shape on 24 January 2005, as part of the projects approved in a council of ministers of the Venezuelan government. According to The Boston Globe, the Venezuelan government provided broadcasting facilities and 70% of Telesur's funds, with other leftist governments supporting the network as well. Telesur was advertised "as a Latin socialist answer to CNN." Telesur began broadcasting on a limited, four-hour schedule on 24 July 2005, on the 222nd birthday of Latin American leader Simón Bolívar. The network began full-time broadcasts on 31 October 2005.

In 2009, Venezuela subsidized the launch of the communications satellite Venesat-1, in part to amplify Telesur's programming by enabling it to avoid geo-blocking efforts by DirectTV, an American company.

The founder of Telesur was Aram Aharonian, a journalist and scholar, who left Uruguay after the 1973 coup d'état. Aharonian stated that the idea of Telesur was "to see ourselves as we truly were", stating that he sought more diversity in the media. After Aharonian resigned from his position as the network's director in 2013, he commented in a 2014 interview that Telesur "did not achieve latinamericanization and continued to be Venezuelan".

=== Sponsor countries ===
Current sponsors Former sponsors

La Nueva Televisora del Sur, C.A. is a public company which has various Latin American governments as its sponsors. Its primary sponsor is the Government of Venezuela; Cuba, Nicaragua, Uruguay, and Bolivia have contributed as well. Argentina was its second main sponsor, but after the victory of big tent center-right coalition Cambiemos in the elections of 2015, the new government decided in 2016 to pull out allegedly because of a "lack of 'pluralism'." In June 2016, the Argentine government announced that it would no longer support Telesur broadcasting. Argentina became the first founding member of Telesur to discontinue participation.

=== Uruguay ===
On 3 March 2005 Venezuelan president Hugo Chávez signed several agreements with then-recently elected Uruguayan president Tabaré Vázquez regarding the energetic and communicational integration of both countries, one of them being the joint creation and financing of Telesur. After just under a year of signing the agreements, they had not been carried out, although the party of President Vázquez had a majority in the country's legislative branch. Venezuelan journalist Andrés Izarra, president of Telesur, confirmed in an interview in January 2006 the delay in the approval of the full incorporation of the country to the network: "There is a special situation (in Uruguay), because although the country is a member of Telesur, until their Congress does not approve it, we can't broadcast the channel locally or receive government funding. The situation requires a political decision and we hope that the government of Tabaré Vázquez support the initiative". The president of the Uruguayan Deputies' Education Commission, Jorge Brovetto confirmed in February 2006 the country still wasn't part of the network's sponsors and asked that, until the parliament decided on a final status, Uruguay's name be removed as a sponsor from Telesur's promotions and website. In June 2006, Uruguay's Minister of Education and Culture, Brovetto, expressed worries regarding the network's editorial line on certain issues and governments in the region, and how the diplomacy of his country could be affected by it. Uruguay's Chamber of Senators approved the bill that would ratify the agreements on 8 August 2006 by votes of the legislators belonging to ruling party, but the Chamber of Deputies postponed several times the debate on the draft. Although sources close to the Congress told the press in February 2009 that the issue of incorporation to Telesur "was not a priority item in their agenda", and that the issue would not be discussed during the remainder of that year, the agreement was finally ratified on 2 June 2009.

On 13 March 2020, the new government of Luis Alberto Lacalle Pou stopped funding the network as part of the country's new foreign affairs strategy of "not integrating alliances based on ideological affinities".

=== Impact of sanctions applied by United States ===
In 2018, English-language Telesur canceled "The Empire Files", a program produced by United States–based journalists Abby Martin and Mike Prysner. Martin, Prysner, and other Telesur contract journalists had their funding blocked by the application of United States sanctions against Venezuela. Academic Stuart Davis cites the cancellation as an example of how United States sanctions hamper public funding of media production in Venezuela.

== Journalists and staff ==
The channel's news agenda was originally decided by its board of directors with the aid of an advisory council, consisting of many leftist intellectuals, including Nobel Peace Prize winner Adolfo Pérez Esquivel, poet Ernesto Cardenal, writers Eduardo Galeano, Tariq Ali, Saul Landau, editor-in-chief of Le Monde diplomatique and historian Ignacio Ramonet, Argentine film producer Tristán Bauer, free software pioneer Richard Stallman and US actor and activist Danny Glover.

Richard Stallman, who was on the advisory board that oversaw the launch of the channel, resigned on 26 February 2011, criticizing the channel's coverage during the Libyan Civil War and describing it as a pro-Gaddafi stance.

On 19 November 2006, the then correspondent of Telesur in Colombia, Fredy Muñoz Altamiranda, was arrested in Colombia on charges of rebellion and terrorism. Muñoz Altamiranda said that he feared for his life after being released due to subsequent threats. Reporters Without Borders questioned the evidence against Múñoz and called his imprisonment an "outrage" and an "abuse", arguing that the Colombian government could be acting against press freedom if the journalist had been jailed due to his work or because of past Telesur interviews with Colombian guerrillas. The Inter American Press Association also criticized his detention and asked for the respect of due process.

Telesur correspondent in Argentina, Edgardo Esteban, was awakened the morning on 11 September 2008, by the detonation of a homemade bomb of low intensity in front of his home. The journalist had received several threats because of his work on torture and corruption of Argentine military during the Falklands War. The Latin American Federation of Journalists, the Forum of Argentine Journalism and the Inter American Press Association expressed its rejection to any situations that put at risk the life of the journalist and demanded from the national and provincial authorities to work "so that intimidation against journalists will not happen again". Esteban expressed concern for his life and his family after the attack. Correspondent in Ecuador, Elena Rodríguez, has received death threats.

In October 2018, Telesur anchor Daniela Vielman resigned from the network, denouncing xenophobic treatment from employers.

== Reception ==
In 2005, after Telesur was founded, it was described as a network showcasing the diversity of Latin America. Telesur also "won praise for its high production values and its intensive reporting about Latin America for Latin Americans". The network has leftist views representing its sponsorship nations: Bolivia, Cuba, Nicaragua, Uruguay and Venezuela.

Writing in The Sage Handbook of Propaganda, Daniel Aguirre and Caroline Ávila state that Telesur was among the media outlets created and established under chavismo "that amplify the propaganda messaging that Chávez directly articulated and was later channeled by pro-government media". Joel D. Hirst, a former International Affairs Fellow in Residence of the Council on Foreign Relations, stated that the Bolivarian Alliance for the Peoples of Our America (ALBA), knowing the importance of propaganda, "embarked upon an ambitious plan to control information across the hemisphere" and began their plan with the creation of Telesur in 2005.

=== Political bias ===
==== Venezuela ====
Telesur was a propaganda tool for Hugo Chávez and his Bolivarian Revolution, with the network acting as a mouthpiece for the Venezuelan regime. According to Aram Aharonian, the founder of Telesur who was removed from the network in December 2008 by former Venezuelan Minister of Popular Power for Communication and Information Andres Izarra, Chávez "took the reins" of Telesur and used "propaganda as rolling news".

In 2005, according to Connie Mack IV, a Republican from Florida's 14th congressional district who authored a House amendment authorizing Washington to create a station that would broadcast exclusively to Venezuela, Telesur undermines the balance of power in the western hemisphere and spreads Chávez's "anti-American, anti-freedom rhetoric". After the House passed the amendment, the Venezuelan ambassador in Washington, D.C., Bernardo Álvarez, stated that "in Venezuela there are 48 channels of free access to anyone with a television set and a small antenna. Only two of them belong to the government. You can also receive more than 120 channels from four continents." The chairman of the US Broadcasting Board of Governors, which runs Voice of America broadcasts in Latin America, Walter Isaacson said that the US could not be "out-communicated" by what he called enemies such as Telesur.

Critics have argued that Telesur works as a propaganda network for the governments of Hugo Chávez and Nicolás Maduro, and provides coverage that focus only on information that may benefit or harm a government, according to its political alignment. By 2019, Telesur "insistently pointed out through reports that in Venezuela there is no humanitarian emergency, scarcity or general crisis" and "dismissed the exodus of millions of Venezuelans in search of a better life". A June 2015 publication from the Legatum Institute states that TeleSUR's Venezuelan coverage "attempts to whitewash regime abuses and failures. TeleSUR focuses on exaggerated coverage of negative events elsewhere, such as racial tensions in Ferguson, Missouri, or unemployment in Spain, and sets up false comparisons, such as equating Venezuelan supermarket queues and queues for the 'Black Friday' shopping holiday in the US."

==== Argentina ====
According to the Argentinian website Infobae, during a large demonstration in Argentina in December 2017 against policies proposed by center-right Argentine President Mauricio Macri (who previously denounced human rights abuses in Venezuela), Telesur "omitted the attack on uniforms and the large number of injured policemen (...) and also omitted that protagonist of one of the incidents was pre-candidate to deputy for a left party, Santiago Sebastian Romero". While "there were demonstrations in Venezuela against the economic policies of Venezuelan President Nicolás Maduro in the same year, that ended with 100 deaths, thousands of arbitrary detentions and injured people. In those cases, Telesur praised the Venezuelan National Guard and the Bolivarian National Police, accused the demonstrators of being related to the United States, and considered Maduro's government as a promoter of peace".

=== Representation of images ===
During the 2019 shipping of humanitarian aid to Venezuela, Telesur disseminated photos of protesters that the author of said were protesters dousing and burning humanitarian aid in gasoline. Agence France-Presse concluded that the original author of the photos was Karla Salcedo Flores and that the images "do not show a man pouring gasoline on one of the burning trucks during the incidents", as alleged by Telesur.

=== Advertisements ===
While promoting an ad campaign for the Government of Venezuela, Telesur used a photo on Twitter of Miami Herald reporter Jim Wyss arriving at the Miami International Airport after being arrested by Venezuelan authorities and interrogated by SEBIN. The Telesur Twitter campaign stated, "We love Venezuela for receiving foreigners like one of our own." The incident became popular in the international media since they found the use of the photo ironic due to the circumstances surrounding it. Telesur later removed the photo from their Twitter account.

=== Human rights ===
Americas director of Human Rights Watch, José Miguel Vivanco, opposed the creation of Telesur. In 2005, Vivanco stated, "If the shareholders of this company belong to a government like Cuba where they have no basic concept of free speech and zero tolerance for independent views, God help us". Human Rights Watch also criticized the Venezuelan government in 2008 for preventing the freedom of expression of private media by blocking their expansion while strengthening the presence of Telesur and other government media in the country.

Following the election of Mauricio Macri as President of Argentina, Macri and Venezuelan President Nicolás Maduro engaged in disputes over Venezuela's human rights, with the Argentine government later pulling its funding of Telesur in March 2016 alleging that Telesur "blocks alternative viewpoints".

=== 2009 Honduras coup ===
A group of Telesur and Venezuelan state media journalists were in Honduras on 28 June 2009 to cover the events in relation to a non-binding referendum on the possibility of changes to the constitution of Honduras. Upon learning that soldiers of the Honduran military had ousted President Manuel Zelaya in a coup and exiled him to Costa Rica, the Telesur staff stayed in the country to cover events following the coup.

A day after the coup, Telesur journalist Adriana Sívori and the crew accompanying her were arrested by the Honduran military. Several other international journalists were also under threat and their passports were retained. As soon as the world learned of the detention, the journalists and their staff were quickly released. Sívori was reportedly assaulted by the soldiers who detained her. Telesur was, until the detention and quick release of journalist Sívori, the only international channel that was broadcasting live the unrest in the streets of Tegucigalpa. The coverage of the coup by the channel, according to supporters of ousted President Manuel Zelaya and several social and sindical organizations, was essential to make the world and, to some extent, the Honduran people know "without censorships" the situation in the country and President Zelaya's whereabouts.

On 30 June 2009, several social organizations and journalistic unions in Venezuela took part in a march to the channel's studios in solidarity with the journalists.

On 12 July 2009, the Telesur crew, which were working together with the Venezuelan state media were arrested at dawn by police in the hotel where they were staying. After a rigorous review of their documents and after being warned that if they continued their work in the country their personal safety was at risk, the crews were released but banned from leaving the hotel. The teams decided to leave the country after concluding that it was not possible to continue their work. The Latin American Federation of Journalists, the Inter-American Commission on Human Rights and the Inter American Press Association condemned what they considered an attempt to stifle the free flow of information on the situation in the country.

On 25 September, Telesur journalists claimed they had been attacked with high-frequency radiation and mind-altering gas along with other international journalists accompanying Manuel Zelaya during his entrenchment in the Brazilian embassy after returning to the country on 21 Sept.

Telesur reported on 9 October that their media staff, who were covering the stay of President Manuel Zelaya in the Brazilian Embassy in Tegucigalpa since his arrival on 21 September, were forced to leave by "the progressive deterioration of their health due to a systematic plan of repression carried out by the de facto authorities".

=== Ukraine and Russia ===
In the Russian invasion of Ukraine that began in 2022, critics say that Telesur has spread Russian disinformation in Latin America.

== Distribution ==
Telesur is available free-to-air via satellite in Latin America, the United States, Central Europe, Western Europe, and Northern Africa. The network's availability through cable television has been very limited in Latin America because of the network's editorial approach to several events and governments in the region; the station manager in 2007, Aram Arahonian, said in an interview that "cable owners do not provide us with any access [...] it's not frequent, but it has affected us in the large countries."

According to Christopher Walker of the National Endowment for Democracy, Telesur is Venezuela's "authoritarian media outlet" and has the ability to take advantage of both domestic and foreign media due to censorship of competing outlets in authoritarian states and openness in democratic states, which allow Telesur to broadcast.

=== South America ===
The availability of the channel via terrestrial television is greatly limited in the vast majority of South American countries. The only countries in the region that receive all of Telesur's broadcasts via terrestrial television are Venezuela and Ecuador, whose governments are sponsors of the channel. Telesur is currently available via Digital Terrestrial Television in Argentina, as part of the government-sponsored channel lineup which includes several other public service, educational, music, sports, and news channels. Venezuela started broadcasting Telesur via terrestrial television on 9 February 2007 and Ecuador on 15 July 2009. The rest of the sponsor countries broadcast some of the networks' programs, mainly the news, in their public and educational channels (see list of sister channels).

The network started in February 2008 to broadcast some news programming to Brazil in Portuguese through several community stations in the state of Paraná. By 2011, Telesur is no longer available in Brazil.

==== Cuba ====
Although Cuba is one of the primary funders of Telesur, the channel is not available in all areas of the country. Additionally, it was not until late 2007 that its programming was broadcast daily on the island, and still only from 22:30 until 8:00 the following day via Canal Educativo 2, an educational television channel. From 20 January 2013, live simulcasting of Telesur has been extended and now occurs daily from 20:00 until 16:30. Until January 2013, some of Telesur's programming was broadcast in Cuba during the day as a one-hour, highly edited mix of its news and documentary programs titled "Lo mejor de Telesur" (The Best of Telesur), or, depending on the topic in the program, Mesa Redonda Internacional, a news and opinion program produced for Telesur by the Cuban Institute of Radio and Television. According to the Swedish analyst Nathan Shachar the Cuban government thusly censors any information that is not to the liking of its "political system", which includes "free elections, multiparty, strikes and protest movements that are non-existent on the island".

=== Additional language versions ===
After his interview with Christiane Amanpour for CNN, President Nicolás Maduro announced that as part of the U.S. media coverage of the 2014 Venezuela protests Telesur would launch in English, French and Portuguese on 24 July 2014, to coincide with Simón Bolívar Day.

In July 2014, an English Telesur website was launched. A 24-hour broadcast channel started in July 2015. On 23 January 2018, the Facebook page was deleted momentarily. However, a Facebook spokesperson later stated "[Telesur English] was temporarily unavailable due to an internal mistake." One staffer's Facebook has over 400,000 likes.

== Programming ==
The former news ident (July 2012)

Current programming is:

- Telesur Noticias (Telesur News): Current affairs Latin American news program broadcast from the network's headquarters in Caracas, Venezuela with permanent correspondents and collaborators in several countries throughout the region and other parts of the world.
- El Mundo Hoy (The World Today): Extended morning edition of Telesur Noticias.
- Conexión Global (Global Connection): Extended midday edition of Telesur Noticias.
- Edición Central (Central Edition): Extended evening edition of Telesur Noticias.
- Deportes Telesur (Telesur Sports): Sports News Show.
- Reportajes Telesur (Telesur Reports): Weekly analytical program regarding Latin America's most important current events.
- Agenda Abierta: A news and interviews program hosted by Argentine journalist Lourdes Zuazo regarding Latin America's current events; now a segment of El Mundo Hoy.
- Dossier: An international news program hosted by Venezuelan journalist Walter Martínez on weekday nights; this program is also broadcast on Venezuelan State TV.
- Impacto Económico (Economical Impact): Business and economical news, hosted by Argentine journalist Marcela Heredia.
- Mesa Redonda Internacional: Political and social analysis program broadcast on Tuesday and Thursday nights live from Havana, Cuba.
- Síntesis: Summary of weekly top stories broadcast on Saturday mornings.
- Maestra Vida: Biographies of Latin American personalities.
- Jugada Crítica: Analysis and news from a geopolitical and geostrategic point of view.
- Enclave Politica: Interviews, opinion, and news on political and social events.
- The World Today with Tariq Ali: An interpretation of the political world with Tariq Ali from London, England.
- El Punto en La i: Investigative journalistic analysis of topics of interest to Latin America and the Global South, directed by Venezuelan journalist Lucía Córdova.

Former programming is:

- Sones y Pasiones: Documentary program regarding Latin American music and its performers.
- Vamos a Conocernos: Brief information regarding the geography, culture and history of Latin American countries.
- Vidas: Program on people who excel in several areas despite the poverty and hardships in their communities.
- Memorias del Fuego: Documentary program which broadcasts independent documentaries on contemporary Latin America.
- Destino Latinoamérica (Destination Latin America): A series of programs about Latin American tourist destinations.
- América, Tierra Nuestra (America, Our Land): Documentaries about Latin American culture and folklore.
- Contravía: Documentary program regarding Colombia's sociopolitical situation, hosted by journalist Hollman Morris.
- Alerta Verde (Green Alert): Documentary program regarding the deterioration of Latin American ecosystem in several countries.
- En vivo desde el SUR (Live from the South): Live individual interviews regarding the most important news of the day, hosted by Colombian journalist Patricia Villegas on weekdays at night.
- Rear Window: Cultural magazine program presented by Tariq Ali
- Historia de las Ciudades (The History of the Cities): Documentary program regarding the history of Latin American cities
- SoloCortos.com: brief audiovisual works created by Latin American directors.
- CineSUR: Latin American independent cinema.
- Agenda del Sur: Live morning news and talk show.
- Cubanos en primer plano (Cubans in the foreground): Biographies of Cuban personalities.
- De este lado: Political and social analysis program produced in Mexico and hosted by journalist Blanche Petrich
- Resumen 'Aló Presidente': An abridged version of the program hosted by Venezuelan president Hugo Chávez on Venezuelan State TV.
- Visión 7 Internacional: International news and analysis broadcast Saturdays live from Buenos Aires on Argentina's Canal 7; also simulcasted on Telesur.
- Mediotanque: A program regarding Uruguayan culture and folklore.
- Videoteca contracorriente (Counterflow videotheque): Interviews with contemporary Latin American social leaders and personalities, "developed with a critical and progressive view".

== See also ==
- Pink tide
- Socialism of the 21st century
- State media
- Television in Latin America
