= Censorship during the Bolivarian Revolution =

From 1999 to present day

Hearing of the Inter-American Commission on Human Rights (IACHR) regarding censorship and freedom of expression in Venezuela (2017)

Censorship during the Bolivarian Revolution in Venezuela refers to all actions that can be considered as the suppression of freedom of expression in the country during the revolution. The NGO Reporters Without Borders, in its 2017 annual report, ranked the country 137th out of 180 countries evaluated regarding the degree of press freedom, concluding that since 2010 there have been arbitrary detentions and defamation trials against journalists.

== Hugo Chávez (1999−2013) ==
=== Reports ===
The Law on Social Responsibility in Radio and Television (Ley Resorte) was introduced during the Bolivarian Revolution by the body CONATEL (National Telecommunications Commission of Venezuela) in December 2004, in charge of radio and television censorship of a wide range of content. The law includes articles that have been the subject of political controversy. The opposition says that this Law is a "Gag Law" with which the government has effectively censored any critical information about its administration, in addition to severely restricting the freedom of expression of the remaining media.

The NGO Human Rights Watch stated that "during the government of President Chávez and now during the presidency of Nicolás Maduro, the accumulation of power in the executive branch and the erosion of guarantees on human rights have allowed the government to intimidate, censor, and persecute its critics," and reported that broadcasters may be censored if they criticize the government.

The NGO Reporters Without Borders also said in 2013 that the media in Venezuela are "almost totally dominated by the government and its mandatory broadcasts, called 'cadenas'." However, the government says that about 70% of the media, both radio and television, are privately owned (opposed to the governments of Chávez and Maduro), while only 5% are state-owned and the other 25% are community media.

The Association of Argentine Journalistic Entities condemned the censorship suffered by the Argentine channel TN in Venezuela, describing it as a serious act of censorship that worsens the democratic deterioration in Venezuela.

Regarding Internet censorship during the 2014 Venezuelan protests, Reporters Without Borders warned about the "growing censorship of Internet service in Venezuela," which included blocking images from the social network Twitter, the Zello application, and blocking Internet access in the state of Táchira in the west of the country.

=== Television ===
On 15 February 2004, during the broadcast of the program Aló Presidente, President Hugo Chávez said he was prepared with the Bolivarian National Armed Forces of Venezuela to take Globovisión and Venevisión off the air, calling them conspirators, coup plotters, and terrorists.

==== Closure of Radio Caracas Televisión ====
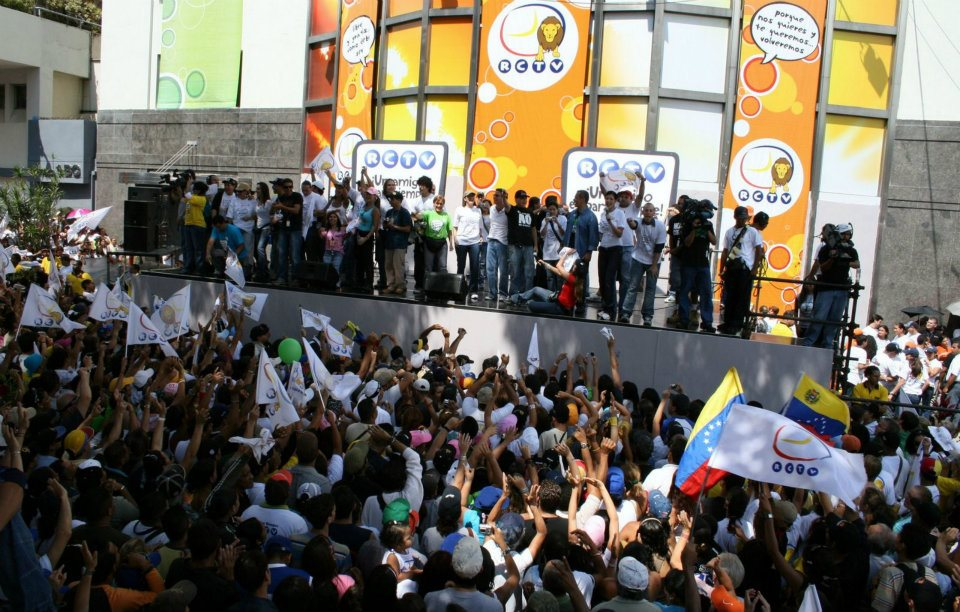
Demonstration in front of the RCTV building in Caracas.

In May 2007, controversies about freedom of the press escalated further with the non-renewal of the free-to-air concession of Radio Caracas Televisión (RCTV). A later statement from Reporters Without Borders declared that "RSF condemns the decision of the Supreme Court of Venezuela to dismiss RCTV's appeal against the loss of its license as inadmissible." President Chávez had already said on 28 December 2006 that he would oppose the renewal of the station's broadcasting license, accusing it of having supported the brief coup d'état that ousted him on 11 April 2002, as well as for its role in the 2002–03 oil strike. The appeal, launched on 9 February 2007, was rejected on 18 May, putting an end to any further debate on the matter.

According to the Chávez government, the license expired on 27 May of that same year, and would not last until 2021 as RCTV claimed. However, without waiting for that date or for a related decision by the Supreme Court, on 11 May the president had already signed a decree assigning channel 2's frequency to a new government-owned channel called TVes (Televisora Venezolana Social). The government action generated political protests and student demonstrations from then on. RCTV returned to cable operators in July 2007 under the name RCTV Internacional. At the beginning of 2010, due to a violation of the Law on Social Responsibility in Radio and Television, the government ordered the suspension of RCTV's signal from the country's cable television operators. However, in June of the same year, RCTV returned through satellite systems and also began broadcasting on the Internet with children’s and youth programming.

==== Globovisión’s difficulties and sale of the channel ====
The relatively young television channel Globovisión, which broadcasts news 24 hours a day and expanded in 1999, owned by Luis Teófilo Núñez Arismendi, Guillermo Zuloaga Núñez, Nelson Mezerhane and Alberto Federico Ravell, was pressured by the Chávez government after the closure of Radio Caracas Televisión (RCTV) starting in 2008. CONATEL began an administrative process on 27 November for violating the Ley Resorte during the results of the 2008 regional elections by allowing candidate Henrique Salas Feo in the state of Carabobo to call for the takeover of the Regional CNE office during an interview, where the election result was unclear. On 7 May 2009, CONATEL initiated a third administrative process against the channel for reporting on tremors in the capital, accusing it of creating panic among the population. On 5 June 2009, SENIAT fined Globovisión 5.5 million bolívares fuertes (2.3 million dollars), alleging "non-payment of taxes" for broadcasting institutional messages that were not declared during the 2002–2003 national strike. Globovisión successfully carried out the Globopotazo fundraising campaign to pay the fine in record time; however, on 16 June SENIAT raised the fine to 9 million bolívares fuertes. On 4 August, dozens of motorcycle riders wearing red berets surrounded the entrance and attacked the Globovisión offices, subduing the security guards, forcibly entering the ground floor of the building, breaking glass doors and windows, and throwing two tear gas bombs. President Chávez condemned the attack and the pro-government leader Lina Ron, who was detained for two months after the incident. In October 2011, the president of Conatel, Pedro Maldonado Marín, imposed a fine of about US$2.1 million on the channel for its coverage of the prison crisis during the June riot at the El Rodeo prison. Guillermo Zuloaga sent a letter to the channel’s employees confirming the intention to sell and explaining that the channel was economically, politically, and legally unviable. On 14 May 2013, the sale of Globovisión to businessmen Raúl Gorrín, Juan Domingo Cordero and Gustavo Perdomo was finalized.

=== Closure of radio stations ===
Venezuela has about 699 radio stations nationwide, and it is claimed that between 2002 and 2022, 233 stations were closed. The year 2022 marked the highest number of closures of radio companies by the government.

The term Radiocidio in Venezuela initially referred to the state intervention of 32 radio stations and 2 television stations on 1 August 2009. This measure was ordered by the then director of the National Telecommunications Commission, Diosdado Cabello. The action was perceived as censorship by various non-governmental organizations, unions, and international bodies. The government argued that the closures were due to lack of legal requirements, death of the concession holder, expiration of the concession, or failure to provide updated information on new operators in case of transfers. Among those affected were the Belfort National Circuit and the 102.3 FM CNB station of journalist and president of the National College of Journalists, William Echevarría, which broadcast daily the opinion program Aló, Ciudadano.

=== Censorship of scientific information ===
Censorship of scientific information in Venezuela, based on the knowledge and expertise of scientists, has increased since the self-proclaimed Bolivarian Revolution (1999– ). Although there were past cases, such as the veiled threat against Luis Razetti by the government of Juan Vicente Gómez in 1924 when he declared during a session of the National Academy of Medicine about the neglect of the children of Caracas, since the arrival of Hugo Chávez to the Presidency (1999), scientists and professionals working in the Public Administration have refrained from making statements to journalists or expressing opinions contrary to the State for fear of reprisals.

This trend was reinforced in 2007 with the creation of a single spokesperson system in research institutes under the Ministry of Science and Technology. Consequently, researchers from autonomous academic institutes such as CIDA and IVIC could not give statements without authorization from the Ministry. This guideline was established by Presidential Decree 5384. Thus, restricting scientific information became a violation of society’s right to information. While scientists could publish research results, their efforts to disseminate data or share expertise on issues related to public welfare were limited, whether through statements to journalists or publications in the media. The following cases illustrate how this policy began even before 2007.

From 2002 onward, the Chávez government gave little space to dissenting opinions and viewed unfavorable information, even from experts within the State, as disloyalty to the regime rather than to society. Nutritionist María de las Nieves García, researcher at IVIC and disciple of Miguel Layrisse, presented the latest results of a study on iron deficiency and anemia in children at a scientific meeting held in Caracas at the Fundación Bengoa on 14–15 March 2005. She found that in samples collected in 2004 by FUNDACREDESA in the states of Guárico, Cojedes and Portuguesa, 70% of children under two years old showed iron deficiency and anemia. Similar results had been observed since 2003 in Caracas. García noted that corn flour distributed by Mercal, the government’s food network, lacked iron fortification, reversing earlier progress in combating anemia. Her findings were later published internally at IVIC and republished by Universia.

Government officials disputed García’s data and questioned her ethics. The Ministry of Science and Technology published a statement criticizing her, and she was denied the chance to publish a response at IVIC. García eventually circulated her version online, receiving only limited support from colleagues. Her ties with FUNDACREDESA ended soon after.

Another case occurred in 2006, when physicist Claudio Mendoza, IVIC researcher, published an article titled "Critical Mass" in El Nacional criticizing Venezuela’s nuclear policy. The IVIC board quickly rejected his article, demanded evidence, and eventually dismissed him from his laboratory leadership. The debate centered not on his arguments but on his right to free expression. Although supported by colleagues citing Article 57 of the Constitution, Mendoza was sanctioned, with IVIC authorities calling his dismissal a "very mild penalty".

=== Epidemiological alarm ===
In July 2007, physician Heide Mago, head of the Infectology Unit at the Enrique Tejera Hospital Center (CHET) in the industrial city of Valencia, was dismissed by the regional public health authority for having provided information to the public about the existence of resistant bacteria causing infections that posed a serious risk to the hospital unit. The disclosure of the information served as an alarm, and once the situation became public, the city authorities acted to provide the hospital with the necessary instruments to eradicate the problem, after the professional had already been dismissed. Previously, in March of the same year, Dr. Mago had addressed the deputy head of the hospital, presenting "a series of recommendations made by her team to avoid complications and deaths from infections," but this did not yield results. This was reportedly the reason why the group of infectologists from the state of Carabobo openly addressed the state authorities and the general community, alerting them about the situation. The regional health authorities claimed that the news was alarmist and that it could lead to panic among patients and their families, but they could not deny the deaths that had occurred, and belatedly admitted that these were due to bacterial infection. There were also statements describing the experts' declarations as "media terrorism". At this point, the physician provided the information as an expert, allowing the public to understand what was happening in the hospital, while also raising the alarm in an area within her competence.

== Nicolás Maduro (2013−present) ==
=== Television ===
==== Blocking and censorship of international networks ====
The Government of Venezuela blocked and censored the international broadcast of the Colombian news channel NTN24 on 12 February 2014, removing it from cable television operators as ordered by CONATEL. On 10 October of the same year, access to the Argentine news portal Infobae was blocked. In 2017, the Venezuelan government ordered the blocking and censorship of the signal of CNN en Español after a report denouncing the regular use of passports. In response, the Venezuelan government stated that "The administrative sanctioning procedure and the consequent preventive measure of suspension and immediate removal of CNN en Español broadcasts from the national territory does not respond to an act of censorship, but rather to the open transgression of Venezuelan legislation by this communication company, on the contrary". On 15 February of the same year, the Mexican broadcaster TV Azteca was also removed from cable television operators. The action was condemned by international organizations, the Venezuelan opposition, and international media associations. On 10 April 2017, amid anti-government protests, the Argentine channel Todo Noticias was removed from programming throughout Venezuela. On 24 August of the same year, CONATEL took Caracol TV and RCN Colombia off the air.

==== Blocking of CNN en Español ====
In early February 2017, CNN and CNN en Español launched the new investigative series Passports in the Shadows (Pasaportes en las sombras), which revealed several irregularities related to the issuance of Venezuelan visas and passports. It was also suggested that the issuance of passports and visas had close links with individuals suspected of participating in terrorist activities. A confidential document revealed that Venezuelan Vice President Tareck El Aissami had ties with 173 people from Middle Eastern countries, including individuals linked to Hezbollah, all of whom had received Venezuelan passports and identifications.

On 15 February 2017, the Venezuelan government ordered many cable television providers to cut the signal of the U.S. network. According to Andrés Eloy Méndez, director of the National Telecommunications Commission, the U.S. broadcaster "incites religious, racial and political hatred, violence and other issues". The government body ordered television companies to cut the signal of CNN en Español immediately. The government agency has not responded to whether the U.S. network will be readmitted.

Other sociologists and politicians saw it as a mere authoritarian and dictatorial act.

==== Blocking of Caracol Televisión and RCN Televisión ====
Since the closure of the Colombia–Venezuela border in 2015, the national signals of RCN Televisión and Caracol Televisión were removed in the states of Zulia, Táchira, and Apure, despite the Colombian-Venezuelan population at the border.

On the night of 23 August 2017, the Venezuelan National Telecommunications Commission (Conatel) ordered cable television operators in Venezuela to take the Colombian channels Caracol Televisión and RCN Televisión off the air without any official explanation from the Nicolás Maduro regime. It is presumed that the scoop on the escape of dismissed prosecutor Luisa Ortega Díaz from Venezuela to Colombia, and her controversial statements implicating the Venezuelan government in the Odebrecht scandal, were the main reasons why the Venezuelan government ordered Conatel to cut the signal of these channels in Venezuelan territory.

==== Blocking of other channels ====
In 2017, the channel Az Mundo was removed from cable operators due to the termination of the contract between Conatel and TV Azteca channels. This also affected its sister channels (Az Clic, Az Corazón, and Az Cinema). In April of that year, the channels Todo Noticias and El Tiempo Televisión were also removed from programming, as both channels covered pro- and anti-government demonstrations during that year. Conatel ordered their signals removed from DirecTV (Channel 716 and Channel 773 respectively), as it was the only operator in the country carrying both channels.

In 2018, Conatel removed CNN Chile from DirecTV (Channel 707), since DirecTV was the only cable operator that carried the signal. The reason for the censorship was not confirmed, although it was possibly due to the broadcast of content considered critical of the government.

In February 2019, Conatel ordered the removal of the signals of National Geographic, Antena 3 Internacional, and VH1 HD because of their coverage of the "Venezuela Aid Live" concert (the first two signals returned in May and October, respectively, while VH1 HD returned in 2020). In the same month, the signal of TV Chile (previously removed in 2010 for broadcasting content against the government) was also taken off the air for covering the "Humanitarian Aid" from Cúcuta.

In April of that year, the signals of CNN International and BBC World News were removed for covering the 30 April demonstrations, although their signals were reinstated two months later. That same month, the channel DW Español was also removed during the broadcast of the documentary Venezuela: la huida de un estado fallido ("Venezuela: the escape from a failed state"). Once the documentary concluded, the signal returned to the country.

On 25 June 2023, Venezuelan cable operators removed the Latin American feed of TBS. This action prevented the arrival of the channel TNT Novelas due to the law of social responsibility in radio and television, approved in Venezuela in 2004. It has been speculated that this law could have been a determining factor. The law sets restrictions on television programming, including the amount of foreign content that can be broadcast. It is possible that Warner Bros. Discovery considered compliance with these restrictions in Venezuela too costly or complicated.

On 30 October of that year, Venezuelan cable operators removed the Latin American feed of TruTV, replacing it with a new channel, Show Business the Channel. This action also prevented the arrival of the channel Adult Swim Latin America due to the 2004 law of social responsibility in radio and television, which regulates and applies restrictions on television programming content, including adult animation broadcasts.

On 4 March 2024, the Nicolás Maduro government ordered Conatel to remove the German channel DW Español (previously removed in 2019) for allegedly publishing reports about corruption in Venezuela and labeling it a "Nazi channel".

==== Blocking of VPItv ====
On 8 January 2021, the Nicolás Maduro government, continuing with censorship, sent a Conatel commission to the headquarters of VPItv in Caracas, seizing the media outlet's equipment. VPItv had been dedicated to live broadcasting the sessions of the National Assembly of Venezuela during the 2015–2020 period. On 13 January, VPItv announced that it would cease operations in the country due to lack of equipment.

==== Foreign television channels censored ====
Media censorship has worsened due to restrictions on users' connections caused by technological infrastructure failures throughout the national territory. Mechanisms of censorship have also been implemented by public and private Internet providers against major news portals. Some channels where blocking was reported included:

International channels censored in Venezuela
Channel	Year of Censorship	Reason
TV Chile	2010 / February 2019	Broadcasting content considered critical of the government / Recognition of Juan Guaidó’s interim government
American Network	2010	Broadcasting content considered critical of the government
Ritmoson	2010	Broadcasting content considered critical of the government
Momentum	2010	Broadcasting content considered critical of the government
América TV	2010	Broadcasting content considered critical of the government
NTN24	2014	Broadcasting anti-government demonstrations
CNN en Español	February 2017	Investigation into illegal passports
Az Mundo	February 2017	Broadcasting opposition protests
Todo Noticias	April 2017	Broadcasting opposition protests
El Tiempo Televisión	April 2017	Broadcasting opposition protests
Caracol Internacional	August 2017	Coverage of former Attorney General Luisa Ortega in Colombia
RCN Nuestra Tele	August 2017	Coverage of former Attorney General Luisa Ortega in Colombia
CNN Chile	June 2018	Broadcasting information contrary to the government
Canal 24 Horas	January 2019	Coverage of the humanitarian aid process at the border
Antena 3 Internacional	February 2019	Coverage of Venezuela Aid Live, returned in October 2019
National Geographic	February 2019	Coverage of Venezuela Aid Live, returned in May 2019
VH1 HD	February 2019	Coverage of Venezuela Aid Live, returned the following year
CNN International	April 2019	Coverage of April 30 protests, returned in July 2019
BBC World News	April 2019	Coverage of April 30 protests, returned in July 2019
DW Español	2018 / 2024	Documentary "Venezuela - Escape from a Failed State", returned to air after the documentary / Taken off the air for reports on the Cartel of the Suns and corruption in Venezuela
Telearuba	2019	Recognition of Juan Guaidó’s interim government
TeleCuraçao	2019	Recognition of Juan Guaidó’s interim government
TBS Latin America	June 2023	Broadcasting content considered inappropriate by the government
TruTV Latin America	October 2023	Broadcasting content considered inappropriate by the government, replaced by Show Business The Channel

Sources: "Los canales internacionales que han sido sacados del aire en Venezuela". El Diario. March 5, 2024. "Estos canales internacionales han salido del aire durante el gobierno de Maduro". El Pitazo. March 5, 2024. "14 canales internacionales fuera del aire en Venezuela desde 2010, según el SNTP". Aporrea. March 7, 2024. "Sntp tras salida de DW: Desde 2010 han sacado 14 canales internacionales". Efecto Cocuyo. March 5, 2024. "Señal de Deutsche Welle sale del aire en Venezuela, gobierno de Maduro acusa al medio alemán de propagar odio". Voz de América. March 5, 2024.

=== Newspapers, journals and magazines ===
On June 27, 2024, National Journalist Day was celebrated in Venezuela in a context marked by censorship, a significant reduction in newspapers, and press restrictions, according to Carlos Correa, director of the NGO Espacio Público. Correa pointed out that in Venezuela, where more than 100 newspapers once existed, only 25 remain, and they do not publish daily. This decline in media outlets is due to restrictive public policies that have limited the circulation of information. Radio and television stations that still operate have reduced their teams and news coverage, affecting the dissemination of public interest issues. In response to these restrictions, digital media initiatives have emerged and had to adapt in terms of funding, language, and work methods. Correa noted that one of the main challenges journalists face is access to information of public interest, as state institutions restrict press conferences, block public sources of information, and fail to provide accountability. In addition, journalists and media outlets are subject to harassment, lawsuits, and website blocking, limiting their ability to publish information and promote public debate in the country.

During 2014, the print press suffered problems with its paper inventory along with other national and regional newspapers because no foreign currency was provided for the purchase of paper, forcing them to reduce the number of pages. Some newspapers had to stop printing, although in this case it did not happen since it managed to receive help from the Grupo de Diarios América. Meanwhile, congressman Julio Chávez claimed that many outlets were not provided foreign currency due to delays in labor solvency payments.

The National Assembly, after an investigation, concluded that despite large imports of paper made by print media, newspapers were reducing their circulation and number of pages.

Miguel Henrique Otero stated in a remote interview—taking advantage of the SIP general assembly in Chile—that he had approached the Complejo Editorial Alfredo Maneiro several times to request paper sales service; however, this was denied by CEAM president Hugo Cabezas.

In October 2024, the Venezuelan tax agency Seniat ordered the closure of "Diario La Voz," founded 58 years ago in Miranda state, for eight months. A commission arrived at the facilities where the newspaper is printed and shut them down, leaving 50 direct workers unemployed. Espacio Público documented between January and August of that year 507 complaints of violations of the right to freedom of expression in Venezuela. "This figure represents an 89% increase in cases and a 94% increase in documented violations compared to the same period last year."

==== El Nacional Newspaper ====
The company faced economic difficulties and paper inventory shortages; therefore, the newspaper El Nacional stopped publishing on Mondays and Saturdays as of August 20, 2018.

In 2015, Diosdado Cabello, while serving as president of the National Assembly of Venezuela, filed a lawsuit against the newspaper El Nacional, Tal Cual, and the news site La Patilla. This action included shareholders, directors, the editorial board, and owners of the mentioned media outlets. The lawsuit was filed because these outlets accused him of alleged links to drug trafficking. Tinedo Guía, president of the National Journalists' Council of Venezuela, said that "this is an action that seeks to stifle independent media since imprisoning their owners does not solve the problems faced by ordinary citizens." A few days after Cabello’s lawsuit, the 12th trial judge, María Eugenia Núñez, imposed a travel ban on 22 executives of the aforementioned media outlets, accused of aggravated continuous defamation.

In April 2021, a civil court sanctioned Diario El Nacional with a payment of 237,000 petros, a little more than US$13 million, for the August 2015 lawsuit for reprinting an article from the Spanish newspaper ABC with the testimony of Leamsy Salazar, who accused Diosdado Cabello of ties to drug trafficking. The lawyer requested clarification on how this amount was determined: "an amount never demanded or handled within the trial (...) without explaining in any way how the figure to be paid as compensation was determined." El Nacional will appeal to the Inter-American Human Rights System (SIDH), the United Nations, and the International Criminal Court.

On May 14, 2021, courts proceeded to seize the building of the newspaper El Nacional to enforce payment of Cabello’s lawsuit.

==== Panorama Newspaper ====
On January 8, 2021, Diario Panorama was closed for five days. Three other independent media outlets—Efecto Cocuyo, Caraota Digital, and El Pitazo—were accused by Globovisión of being financed to act against the government.

==== El Caroreño Newspaper ====
On August 7, 2024, the headquarters of the newspaper El Caroreño in Carora was raided in an operation carried out by officers of the Bolivarian National Intelligence Service and the National Anti-Extortion and Kidnapping Command of the Bolivarian National Guard.

=== Internet ===
The United Nations (UN), on 29 June 2012, through resolution A/HRC/32/L.20, stated that access to the Internet is a fundamental right, while the UNESCO refers to freedom of expression as "the cornerstone of democracy".

Due to the strong influence of digital media in Venezuela, such as social networks, portals, and large-scale news websites, these have become key tools for access to information and freedom of expression, since there has been a hegemony of communication by the main radio and television media. Due to the various socio-political situations the country faced in 2017, many citizens turned to digital media for free access to information and to exercise their right to free expression, so the government and media regulators resorted to implementing new legal mechanisms intended to limit the right to information and free expression, such as the Resorte Law and the Anti-Hate Law.

Temporary or permanent blocking of HTTP, DDoS attacks, SNI filtering, and DNS blocking are some of the censorship actions implemented by the national government to regulate or control access to information.

==== 2018 ====
In 2018, Venezuelan pornographic actor Víktor Rom won a Prowler European Porn Award in the category Best European Daddy. In response, Minister of Culture Ernesto Villegas criticized Viktor on Twitter, writing: "This appeared today in one of Venezuela’s pro-Yankee newspapers. Anti-value as a source of pride. Your vote is a tool so that this worldview does not prevail," calling on people to participate in the 2018 Venezuelan presidential election. Rom responded: "Antivalue, minister Ernesto Villegas, is filling your pockets with money while the people starve and live off the miseries you hand out like the CLAP bag," and "Get to work and stop envying those of us who are working." Actresses Sheila and Kesha Ortega joined in support of Viktor.

Shortly after the discussion, the NGO Espacio Público reported that the state-owned operator CANTV blocked access to sexual content pages such as Xvideos, Pornhub, and YouPorn.

=== 2024 ===
On 4 July 2024, the websites of Cazadores de Fake News and EsPaja were blocked by the main telecommunications operators in the country, due to “restrictions” from CANTV, Digitel, Inter, and Movistar. "It has been blocked in Venezuela by the main Internet operators. This action corresponds to a pattern of censorship and restrictions that other media outlets in Venezuela have also suffered." Voice of America had previously warned in May about the high likelihood that disinformation would increasingly circulate before the presidential election of 28 July.

On 11 July, the website of the Instituto Prensa y Sociedad de Venezuela (@ipysvenezuela) was also blocked by the main Internet operators. IPYS is an NGO dedicated to the defense and promotion of freedom of expression and access to information in Venezuela.

On 22 July, six websites were blocked ahead of the presidential elections. Tal Cual, El Estímulo, RunRunes, and Analítica were among the news portals, as well as the NGOs Medianálisis and the watchdog Ve Sin Filtro, which defends digital rights.

In 2024, the Venezuelan government blocked at least 63 websites, according to the NGO Ve Sin Filtro. Among the blockings was access to the social network X since 8 August, forcing users to install VPNs to access and share information. Additionally, the government cuts Internet access when the opposition needs it to spread certain events or applies power outages.

==== Wikipedia blocking ====
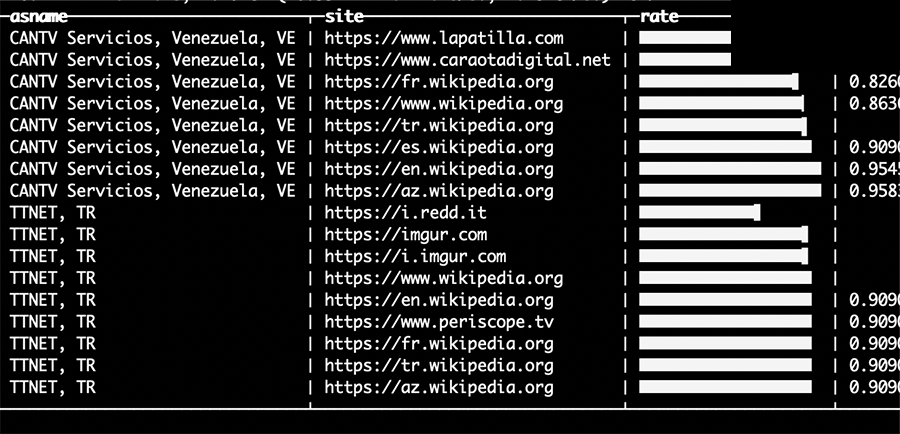
Netblocks report of the developing incident of the Wikipedia block in Venezuela by CANTV on 12 January 2019.

On the afternoon of 12 January 2019, the Internet observatory NetBlocks collected technical evidence of the blocking of all editions of Wikipedia in Venezuela. The restrictions were implemented by CANTV, the country’s largest telecommunications provider. NetBlocks identified a major network disruption affecting telecommunications infrastructure, coinciding with other restrictions that affected Venezuelans’ ability to access information in the previous 24 hours. The data also showed several other websites had recently been restricted, indicating that the recent political instability in the country may have been the main cause of tighter Internet control.

The tension arose from an editorial conflict over the Wikipedia biographical profile of the newly appointed President of the National Assembly Juan Guaidó, which included him as the "51st President of the Bolivarian Republic of Venezuela". Editors failed to reach consensus on whether Guaidó should be recognized as president of Venezuela. This "edit war" led the government to temporarily block access to Wikipedia in the country. Although Wikimedia Venezuela requested clarity on the reasons for the block, access was restored a week later without an official explanation.

==== Human rights violations against Wikipedians in 2022 ====
On 17 October 2022, Óscar Costero, a well-known Wikipedian, went to the main headquarters of the Administrative Service for Identification, Migration and Foreigners (Saime) in Caracas, after facing difficulties online to renew his passport. What seemed to be a mere administrative procedure turned into a series of human rights violations.

Upon arrival, he was informed of an alleged "travel ban". An unidentified official kept him waiting for hours and eventually forced him to sign a statement indicating that he was under investigation and had not been mistreated during his stay at Saime. The situation escalated quickly when, without prior notice, he was detained by the Cuerpo de Investigaciones Científicas, Penales y Criminalísticas (CICPC) and taken for interrogation.

The questions focused on his personal life, finances, and his involvement with Wikimedia, as well as his relationship with Santiago De Viana, an editor on political topics on Wikipedia. It was revealed that De Viana had been the target of defamation, accused of corruption and links to drug trafficking. Costero was also mentioned in this smear campaign.

This series of events relates to a persecution that began after the 2019 blackouts, intensifying later that year against Costero, De Viana, and Wikimedia Venezuela. Although released, Costero faced restrictions on his free movement and a continued denial of his fundamental rights.

On 11 November 2022, lawyers from Espacio Público attempted to access the case file but faced obstacles from judicial authorities. Irregularities accumulated, including lack of information on specific charges and the rejection of an injunction request filed in January 2023.

Despite a judicial decision claiming that no harmful act had been committed against Costero, it is evident that his rights to due process, freedom of association, free expression, and free movement were violated. These events clearly illustrate judicial persecution against Costero and De Viana.

Costero’s defense has repeatedly demanded full access to the case file, emphasizing that his rights have already been seriously violated. Freedom of association and expression are essential for a democratic society and its progress. The Venezuelan state is urged to respect and guarantee these fundamental rights, in line with its international commitments.

In October 2022, Oscar Costero was arbitrarily detained while attempting to renew his passport. During his detention, he was interrogated about his personal life, finances, and his relationship with Wikimedia and Santiago De Viana. This act was denounced by the NGO Espacio Público, which considered the detention a violation of due process. It is also alleged that Costero was baselessly accused of money laundering and incitement to hatred.

De Viana was particularly vulnerable to defamation due to a pseudonym he used on Wikipedia, which was closely linked to his real name. Based on this, an anonymous blog campaign labeled him a "Wikipedia extortionist". These unverified reports also linked the editors to drug trafficking activities.

The NGO Espacio Público has actively defended Oscar Costero’s rights, demanding transparency and access to the case file. The organization stresses the importance of freedom of expression and association, highlighting how essential they are for a democratic society.

The case of Costero and De Viana illustrates the precarious situation of freedom of expression in certain regions and highlights the challenges faced by those who contribute to the dissemination of free and objective information.

==== Suspension of X (formerly Twitter) and Signal ====
In August 2024, Nicolás Maduro ordered Conatel to shut down the social network Twitter for 10 days, claiming that the platform had "violated its own rules" and that it "was inciting fascism and hatred." The messaging app Signal was also suspended. The @signalapp website was blocked by most internet providers. Maduro ultimately decided to maintain the blockade of Twitter, so social media users installed VPNs to access the platform and continue searching for and sharing information.

==== Reports of web censorship ====
A report by VE sin Filtro denounced the blocking of 134 websites in Venezuela, including 60 media outlets, between 4 July 2024 and 10 January 2025.

=== Radio ===
==== 2017 ====
In 2017, according to the National College of Journalists, its secretary general Edgar Cárdenas reported that 55 radio stations had been shut down.

==== 2019 ====
In April 2019, Conatel intervened Radio Caracas Radio and ordered its closure.

==== 2021 ====
On 20 April 2021, three radio stations were shut down in less than a month: Radio Selecta 102.7 FM in Machiques, Aragua Mágica 88.1 FM, and Radio Rumbos 670 AM in Vargas.

==== 2022 ====
In the first seven months of 2022, Conatel shut down 12 radio stations. The measures affected Éxitos 90.5 FM and Calle 98.5 FM in Guárico, Activa 89.3 FM in Anzoátegui, Topacio 101.5 FM in Barinas, Triunfo 99.3 FM in Portuguesa, and Mix 98.3 FM in Yaracuy.

On 16 October 2022, the college of journalists reported that 46 radio stations had been closed in the past four months in seven states. Three more stations were closed in Yaracuy. Zulia (19), Cojedes (14), Sucre (4), Yaracuy (3), Portuguesa (2), Carabobo (2), Guárico (2), and Barinas (2).

- Barinas
  - Topacio 101.5 FM
- Cojedes
  - Impacto 91.7 FM
  - Candela 92.9 FM
  - Hits 92.5 FM
  - Luna 95.5 FM
  - Nex 100.1 FM
  - Moda 105.1 FM
- Carabobo
  - Unión Radio Valencia 105.3 FM
  - Play Top Radio 91.5 FM
- Guárico
  - Éxitos 90.5 FM
  - Calle 98.5 FM
- Zulia
  - Candela 88.3 FM
  - Sensacional Estéreo 88.5 FM
  - Zulia Mía 91.3 FM
  - Kp 92.9 FM
  - Melódica 92.3 FM
  - Mágica 93.3 FM
  - Refugio 94.3 FM
  - Palabra 97.3 FM
  - High Class 98.1 FM
  - Destino 98.3 FM
  - Superior 101.1
  - Suave 102.7 FM
  - Radiolandia 103.3 FM
  - Río Stereo 107.7
- Portuguesa
  - Astro 97.7 FM
  - Kalor 101.9 FM
  - Genial 89.8 FM
  - Triunfo 99.3 FM
  - Sonora 107.7 FM
- Maturín
  - Radio Sabrosa 94.5 FM
  - Mix FM
- Yaracuy
  - Luz 102.9
  - Oasis 90.3
  - El Trocadero y el Cuarto Ángel 106.3

In October, the National Union of Press Workers denounced that the regime had shut down around 79 radio stations in 16 states during 2022. In Falcón state, ten stations were shut down. Previously, in November 2019, the Jet 93.5 radio network was closed and its equipment seized. In Sucre state, seven stations were shut down. On 22 October, eight stations were shut down in Táchira state by order of Conatel, under the argument of "lack of authorization."

- Falcón State
  - Metrópolis 88.1
  - Corianísima 90.1
  - Extrema 92.5
  - Jet 93.5 (2019)
  - Shalom 95.7
  - Top 97.1
  - Cultural 97.5
  - CBN Radio 100.1
  - Calipso 101.5 FM
  - Falconiana 102.7
  - Fiesta 106.5
- Sucre State
  - Bahía 102.5 FM
  - Café 100.9 FM
  - Radio NVH 102.1 FM
  - Cool FM
  - Radio Boom
  - Mágica FM
  - Juventud 100.5 FM
- Táchira State
  - Activación Stereo 93
  - La Nuestra 89.9
  - Pontálida 92.5
  - Somos 88.3
  - Esperanza Viva 98.1
  - Ángel 102.3
  - Café 90.3
  - Explosión Stereo 95.7

In November the Press Union denounced the closure of five radio stations in Cabimas and Ciudad Ojeda, continuing censorship in Venezuela. Conatel shut down two radio stations, La Cordillera 104.7 FM and Máxima 103.9 FM, in Mérida state. One of their arguments for closure is leaving unattended license renewal requests.

- Cabimas
  - Activa 88.3 FM
  - Fiesta 101.1 FM
  - Buenísima 106.3 FM
  - Sabrosa 102.3 FM
- Ciudad Ojeda
  - Citojense Stereo 94.3 FM
- Mérida
  - Cordillera 104.7 FM
  - Máxima 103.9 FM

==== 2023 ====
In March 2023, Conatel closed two stations in Portuguesa state: Radio Chabasquen 106.7 FM, under the concession of the local mayor’s office, and Biscucuy Stereo 88.7 FM in José Vicente de Unda municipality. NGO Espacio Público detailed that at least 284 radio stations had been closed nationwide between 2003 and 2022. In November, Conatel shut down Super Stereo 94.5 FM after the death of its owner Frank Villasmil, president and director of the station for more than two decades, holder of the concession granted by Conatel. Article 10 of Conatel’s Administrative Provision No. 785 establishes that the concession may be extinguished, among other causes, by the death of the holder.

- Portuguesa
  - Chabasquen 106.7 FM
  - BiscuyStereo 88.7 FM
  - Playonera 88.3 FM
- Falcón
  - Super Stereo 94.5
- Táchira
  - Continental 103.5 FM in San Cristóbal
  - Éxtasis 97.7 FM
- Monagas
  - Fe y Alegría 105.9 FM in Maturín
- Carabobo
  - Modulación 100.3 FM
- Anzoátegui
  - Espléndida 93.7 FM, in El Tigre
- Networks
  - Radio Caracas Radio (RCR) 750 AM on YouTube (off air since 2019).
  - Venezuelan Finance Observatory portal

==== 2024 ====
In February, three stations in Ciudad Ojeda were closed: Senda 96.1 FM, Mágica 93.3 FM and Clásicos 93.9 FM after an "administrative technical review" by Conatel. Also in Falcón state, the institutional program "Alcaldía al Día", broadcast for two years on La Kalle 89.9 FM, was taken off the air.

In Trujillo, the National Union of Press Workers (SNTP) denounced the closure of Ecos del Páramo 100.3 FM in Tuñame, ordered by the state governor for not broadcasting his radio program: “That station belongs to the Party and the revolution. I want that station here broadcasting the program. I ordered a month ago that it be intervened because it belongs to the United Socialist Party of Venezuela and I want it broadcasting the program. The world upside down,” he said.

In April, Conatel ordered the closure of Radio Cristal in Lara state, a regional station that had been on the air for 60 years. Conatel also shut down Radio Minuto in Barquisimeto. On May 18, the government suspended the transmission of Éxitos 93.1 in Aragua state to prevent the broadcast of an interview with candidate Edmundo González Urrutia.

In June 2024, SNTP denounced that Conatel shut down Radio Deportiva 98.3 FM in Guárico after ordering to “turn off the transmitter and confiscate part of the equipment.” The station had been broadcasting for 18 years. This closure was followed by La Vernácula 88.3 FM in Zaraza (on air since 2008) and Éxitos 90.5 FM in San Juan de los Morros.

In September, Victoria 103.9 FM in Aragua was closed under resolution N GST-RS00899, declaring the “extinction of the broadcasting concession.” The station had been on the air for over 20 years. Also shut down was Radiohispana895 in Yaracuy, where journalist Biagio Pilieri hosted the program "La Hora Tricolor".

==== 2025 ====
In March, Conatel ordered the closure of Radio Mundial 860 AM based in San Cristóbal.

=== Wiretapping and phone surveillance ===
Censorship has also occurred through wiretapping of cellphones and landlines. Citizens were harassed through their own phones, which were inspected and their messages investigated. A 2022 Communications Transparency report revealed that, under orders of Nicolás Maduro’s government, at least 1,584,547 Movistar phone lines were tapped in 2021. Andrés Azpúrua, director of Ve Sin Filtro, stated: “Some of the people whose communications were intercepted include NGOs or civic actors. The scale is very large, and this indicates systematic abuse. There is no way to disguise this as legitimate criminal investigations—it is clearly abusive and excessive by the State.”

The Attorney General’s office has used and manipulated text messages as evidence to accuse political opponents, citizens, and journalists, employing advanced technology and foreign technicians to recover deleted messages. In 2014, the government founded the Centro de Seguridad y Protección de la Patria (CESPPA), whose basic mission is communications surveillance, based in the Palacio Blanco (Caracas). That year, the government also acquired an IBM Watson (artificial intelligence) license to analyze CESPPA’s data, operated under Héctor Dávila, with thousands of hackers working. Dávila was a director at UCV’s School of Computing, current President-Editor of Últimas Noticias, and electoral technician (2024).

In August 2024, the government admitted to illegally spying on four UN experts during the presidential elections. In a statement, Maduro’s administration sought to discredit the Observer Panel for allegedly maintaining phone contacts with U.S. officials, showing that their conversations were monitored. Jorge Rodríguez Gómez confirmed during the National Assembly session on 14 August that they had “frequent direct contacts, via phone and videoconference, with U.S. State Department officials,” describing their statements as “instructions” from that government.

=== Attacks on press workers ===
==== National Union of Press Workers ====
Journalist Roland Carreño was arrested on 27 October 2020 and released after three years on 19 October 2023 following the Barbados Agreement. He was detained again on 2 August 2024, according to the National Union of Press Workers (SNTP), days after the presidential elections.

During the July 2024 protests, SNTP reported that state security forces carried out 40 acts of intimidation and aggression against journalists. At least 14 journalists and media staff were deported from Venezuela between 25 July and 2 August, according to the union. Most were denied entry at Maiquetía airport and sent back to their home countries. Others were detained by security forces, including in hotels and at checkpoints, before being taken to the airport and expelled.

==== Expelled reporters ====
On 25 July 2024, Italian journalist Marco Bariletti and cameraman Ivo Bonato, working for RAI, were detained at Simón Bolívar International Airport in Maiquetía during passport control and later expelled, being forced to return to Italy. Italian Foreign Minister Antonio Tajani condemned the detention measures against Venezuelan citizens and expressed concern over restrictions on press freedom.

On 26 July 2024, Chilean Foreign Minister Alberto Van Klaveren expressed concern about the situation of a team of journalists from Televisión Nacional de Chile (TVN), detained in Barinas while reporting on the presidential election protests. Journalist Iván Núñez and cameraman José Luis Tapia were informed by the Chilean ambassador in Venezuela, Jaime Gazmuri, that they would be deported to Cúcuta, Colombia. TVN stressed that its staff had entered Venezuela legally with passports through Cúcuta and passed two checkpoints without problems.

On 29 July, Spanish journalist Juan Ramón Martínez Minuesa, known as Cake Minuesa, was detained at his hotel at dawn and taken to the international airport to be deported to Bogotá.

== Constitution ==
The Constitution of Venezuela protects freedom of expression and freedom of the press, establishing that communication is free and plural. Article 57 states:

Every person has the right to freely express his or her thoughts, ideas, or opinions orally, in writing, or by any other form of expression, and to make use of any means of communication and dissemination for this purpose, without censorship. Anonymity, war propaganda, discriminatory messages, or those that promote religious intolerance are not permitted.

=== Laws against freedom of opinion ===
On 8 November 2017, the Constituent Assembly approved the controversial Law against Hatred whose Article 21 establishes prison sentences of up to 20 years for those who incite hatred, discrimination, or violence against a person or group through any medium. The Office of the Special Rapporteur for Freedom of Expression of the Inter-American Commission on Human Rights expressed concern that the law "establishes exorbitant criminal sanctions and powers to censor traditional media and the Internet, contrary to international standards on freedom of expression".

=== Laws restricting organizations' rights ===
In 2010 the government enacted the Law on National Sovereignty and Self-Determination to restrict access to funding for human rights organizations. In November 2020, Sudeban ordered the national banking sector, through Circular SIB-DSB-CJ-OD-06524, to implement control measures to monitor all financial transactions carried out by non-governmental organizations (NGOs). The regulation was published in Official Gazette No. 42.151 in June.

On 21 January 2024, the National Assembly approved in second discussion the Law on the Control and Regulation of NGOs, aimed at limiting citizen participation and human rights defense, without NGO involvement or public consultation. In May 2024, the National Assembly approved nine of the 36 articles of the bill to control NGOs, under the pretext of regulating foreign funding, but used to suppress dissenting voices and civil society activism.

On 14 August 2024, the National Assembly approved in second discussion a new NGO control and regulation law with 39 articles, amid reports of arbitrary detentions of opposition members after the elections in which President Nicolás Maduro was controversially re-elected for a third consecutive term. International organizations warned that this law could trigger repression against more than a thousand detainees and at least 23 deaths, as well as the cancellation of passports of journalists and activists after 28 July. The law grants the Venezuelan state broad powers of surveillance, control and sanction over non-governmental organizations and explicitly prohibits NGOs from carrying out “activities typical of political parties or organizations with political purposes.” Volker Türk, UN High Commissioner for Human Rights, urged Venezuelan authorities not to adopt laws that undermine civic and democratic space.

=== Draft Law against Fascism, Neo-fascism and Similar Expressions ===
The National Assembly approved in first discussion the "Law against fascism, neo-fascism and similar expressions", consisting of 30 articles. The law seeks to prohibit “the dissemination of messages that glorify or promote violence as a method of political action or denigrate democracy”, and establishes the revocation of broadcasting concessions (Article 28) for radio or television media that “broadcast advertising, propaganda or messages” related to fascism or violent acts, ahead of the 2024 presidential elections. The law complements the Political Parties Law (Venezuela) and the Law against Hatred as a tool to limit protests and dissent in Venezuela under the pretext of combating fascism, neo-fascism or similar expressions. It specifies that, once approved, it will prohibit sharing tweets, messages or WhatsApp audios, and posting viral videos with complaints, jokes, or insults against the government or its allied organizations and institutions.

== See also ==
- Censorship in Venezuela
- RCTV shutdown protests
- Television in Venezuela
- 2014 Venezuelan protests
- Law on Social Responsibility on Radio and Television
- Law against Hatred
- List of journalists killed in Venezuela
