= Censorship in Venezuela =

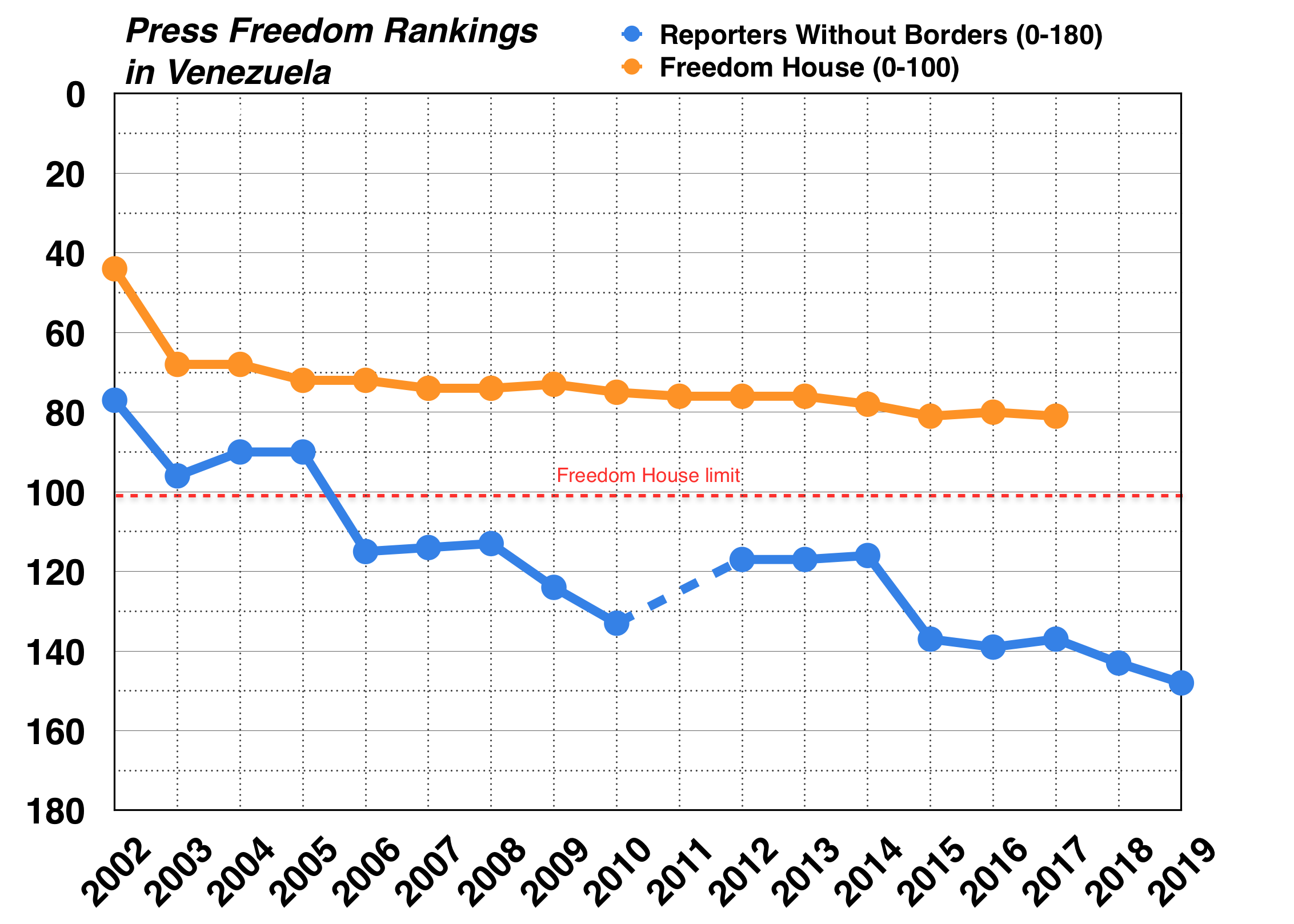
Press freedom rankings of Venezuela (high value = not free). Sources: Freedom House's Freedom of the Press and Reporters Without Borders' Press Freedom Index Note: Freedom House rank limited to 100 (worst)

Censorship in Venezuela refers to all actions which can be considered as suppression in speech in the country. More recently, Reporters Without Borders ranked Venezuela 159th out of 180 countries in its World Press Freedom Index 2023 and classified Venezuela's freedom of information in the "very difficult situation" level.

The Constitution of Venezuela says that freedom of expression and press freedom are protected. Article 57 states that "Everyone has the right to freely express his or her thoughts, ideas or opinions orally, in writing or by any other form of expression, and to use for such purpose any means of communication and diffusion, and no censorship shall be established." It also states that "Censorship restricting the ability of public officials to report on matters for which they are responsible is prohibited." According to Article 58, "Everyone has the right to timely, truthful and impartial information, without censorship..."

Human Rights Watch said that during "the leadership of President Chávez and now Mr. Maduro, the accumulation of power in the executive branch and the erosion of human rights guarantees have enabled the government to intimidate, censor, and prosecute its critics" and reported that broadcasters may be censored if they criticize the government.

Reporters Without Borders said that the media in Venezuela is "almost entirely dominated by the government and its obligatory announcements, called cadenas".

In 1998, independent television represented 88% of the 24 national television channels while the other 12% of channels were controlled by the Venezuelan government. By 2014, there were 105 national television channels with only 48 channels, or 46%, representing independent media while the Venezuelan government and the "communitarian channels" it funded accounted for 54% of channels, or the 57 remaining channels. Freedom House has also stated that there is "systematic self-censorship" encouraged toward the remaining private media due to pressure by the Venezuelan government.

According to the National Union of Press Workers of Venezuela, 115 media outlets have been shut down between 2013 and 2018 during Nicolás Maduro's government, including 41 printed means, 65 radio outlets and 9 television channels.

The Press and Society Institute of Venezuela found at least 350 cases of violations of freedom of expression during the first seven months of 2019.

In 2022, pro-government deputy Jesús Faría admitted that the government blocked digital outlets.

== Press censorship ==
During the dictatorship of Marcos Pérez Jiménez, the censorship of the press, alongside acts of repression such as torturing and killing opponents, were used to maintain his authoritarian government. Authorities monitored information entering and leaving Venezuela in both the English and Spanish languages, including wiretapping telephone lines. Following 1958 Venezuelan coup d'état, which removed Pérez Jiménez, newspapers began to disseminate the abuses that occurred during his administration. For at least two decades after coup, press freedom in Venezuela maintained stability.

Into the 1980s, press freedom in Venezuela began to deteriorate, when the Jaime Lusinchi administration starting having an antagonistic relationship with the press . The Inter American Press Association reported 87 attacks against press freedom between 1984 and 1987. The Lusinchi government especially attacked the press after his affair with his mistress Blanca Ibáñez began to be disseminated by the media.

Both President Hugo Chávez and Nicolás Maduro would pressure media organizations until they failed by preventing them from acquiring necessary resources. The Venezuelan government would manipulate foreign exchange rates for media organizations so that they could no longer import their resources or fine them heavily. The government would then use a front company to give the troubled organization a "generous" offer to purchase the company. Following the buyout, the front company would promise that the staff would not change but would slowly release them and change their coverage to be in favor of the Venezuelan government.

Soon after Nicolás Maduro became President of Venezuela, El Universal, Globovisión and Últimas Noticias, three of some of the largest Venezuelan media organizations, were sold to owners that were sympathetic to the Venezuelan government. Shortly after, employees of the affected media organizations began to resign, some supposedly due to censorship enforced by the new owners of the organizations.

Following nearly 83 years of printing newspapers to the Venezuelan public, on 17 March 2016, the newspaper released its final edition of its physical newspaper, discontinuing the use of printed material. On its final front-page editorial, El Carabobeño explained that the government agency that has the responsibility of distributing newsprint had not attempted to sell the necessary resources to the newspaper.

Following Maduro's election, 55 newspapers in Venezuela stopped circulation due to difficulties and government censorship between 2013 and 2018.

== Radio censorship ==
The radio station Radio Suave of Isa Dobles was shut down after it covered the trial of President Jaime Lusinchi's divorce, later reappearing on air without Dobles' program.

In 2001, there were 500 independent radio stations in Venezuela and only 1 state-sanctioned station.

In August 2009, Diosdado Cabello, then director of the National Commission of Telecommunications (CONATEL), ordered the intervention of 32 radio and 2 television stations, decision that received the name of Radiocide.

Nelson Bocaranda and his son created the Runrunes website after his radio show, Los Runrunes de Nelson, was cancelled in 2009 after the Venezuelan government reportedly said that it would revoke Unión Radio's license if Bocaranda's criticism was allowed to continue on air. Janan Abanhassan and Andrés Cañizález stated in 2016 that the website was born from the censorship that forced Bocaranda off the radio; they named Bocaranda as a "leader of public opinion in Venezuela" for "becoming the spokesperson for the truth, for disseminating the information under investigative support and for having trust and credibility in Venezuelan society".

In 2017, the Maduro government removed 46 radio stations from the air according to the National Union of Workers of the Press.

Since 22 January 2019, Conatel has repeatedly advised against the promotion of violence and the disavowing of institutional authorities, according to the Law on Social Responsibility on Radio and Television imposed in 2004. Some radio programs have been ordered off air, including Cesar Miguel Rondón's radio program, one of the most listened-to programs in the country. Other programs have been temporarily canceled or received censorship warnings, including a threat to close private television and radio stations if they recognized Juan Guaidó as acting president or interim president of Venezuela.

== Television censorship ==
In 2008, Reporters Without Borders reported that following "years of 'media war,' Hugo Chávez and his government took control of almost the entire broadcast sector".

During the 2014 Venezuelan protests, Colombian news channel NTN24 was taken off the air by CONATEL (the Venezuelan government agency appointed for the regulation, supervision and control over telecommunications) for "promoting violence". Mr. Maduro then denounced the Agence France-Presse (AFP) for manipulating information about the protests. After an opposition Twitter campaign asked participants of the Oscar ceremony to speak out in support of them, for the first time in decades, private television channel Venevisión did not show The Oscars, where Jared Leto showed solidarity with the opposition "dreamers" when he won his award.

When a TV series portraying Hugo Chávez titled El Comandante was to be aired for the first time, the Bolivarian government censored the episode with Mr. Maduro saying that El Comandante was "a series to try to disfigure a true leader and a Latin American and world hero", while CONATEL tweeted to Venezuelans that they should inform the commission "if any cable operator insults the legacy of Hugo Chavez transmitting the series ‘El Comandante,’ ... #NobodySpeaksIllOfChavezHere".

On February 12, 2017, CNN en Español was taken off air by CONATEL following a news report accusing the Venezuelan government of selling passports and visas to persons from Middle Eastern countries with dubious backgrounds for profits through its embassy in Baghdad, Iraq. The government deemed the report "(A threat to) the peace and democratic stability of our Venezuelan people since they generate an environment of intolerance."

On April 10, 2017, among anti-government protests, Argentina's Todo Noticias and Colombia's El Tiempo was taken off air by the orders made by CONATEL.

On August 24, 2017, CONATEL removed two Colombian TV channels Caracol TV and RCN Colombia off the air. CONATEL accuses these channels of "collaborated with the dissemination of a message that incited the assassination of the president of the Bolivarian Republic of Venezuela, Nicolás Maduro Moros." The decision to remove these channels was criticized by OAS Secreatary General Luis Almagro and Colombian President Juan Manuel Santos. On the same day, President Nicolás Maduro has been highly critical of international media organisations during his press conference, saying that it was "hard to neutralize the lying power of CNN, Fox News and the BBC by sowing hate every day". Mr. Maduro also said that the BBC "has become the biggest propaganda apparatus for the military intervention" in Venezuela. According to the National Union of Workers of the Press, three television channels were removed in the months up to August 2017.

Canal 24 Horas, a news channel owned by Chile's public broadcaster, Televisión Nacional, was removed from Venezuela's cable and satellite television operators by the state-run National Commission of Telecommunications (Conatel) on 24 January, during the 2019 Venezuelan presidential crisis. Conatel removed 24 Horas once again during the 23 February conflicts in the Venezuelan frontier, no reason was given.

During the Venezuela Aid Live concert on 22 February, NatGeo and Antena 3 were removed from cable and satellite TV for broadcasting the concert. Access to YouTube was also blocked for CANTV users during the concert.

== Internet censorship ==
In a country where all government branches act in compliance with the interests of the ruling party, ensuring a hegemonic media landscape, the Venezuelan people widely use the internet to participate in forums that allow independent expression, particularly social networks. As a result of the government's ongoing siege against private media—which includes the takeover of newspapers by progovernment owners—traditional media outlets have ventured into the digital arena. Due to the comparatively low barriers to entry, new businesses have appeared in this environment as well. It is in this atmosphere that Twitter, Facebook, YouTube and similar platforms have become the final refuge for independent voices and freedom of expression.

— Freedom House

In the Freedom on the Net 2014 report by Freedom House, Venezuela's internet was ranked as "partly free", with the report stating that social media, apps, political and social content had been blocked, while also noting that bloggers and Internet users had been arrested.

The Venezuelan government has been able to partially block internet access to citizens by using a system that allows them to restrict selected content that may threaten their power over the country. "In the 21st century, autocrats have devised specific techniques to put the internet under political control without shutting it down completely." By partially blocking the internet, the government has been able to perform a concealed censorship that often affects the opposition. The population knows that the government interferes with the internet and the communications, but they lack the means to access the evidence that would support their claims.

In 2014, Reporters Without Borders originally stated that Venezuela did not fit the categories of either "surveillance", "censorship", "imprisonment" or "disinformation" but later warned of "rising censorship in Venezuela's Internet service, including several websites and social networks facing shutdowns". They condemned actions performed by the National Commission of Telecommunications (Conatel) after Conatel restricted access to websites with the unofficial market rate and "demanded social networks, particularly Twitter, to filter images related to protests taking place in Venezuela against the government".

Previous research conducted in 2011 by the OpenNet Initiative report said that Internet censorship in Venezuela was "non-existent" In 2012, OpenNet Initiative found no evidence of Internet filtering in the political, social, conflict/security, and Internet tools areas. Recently, OpenNet Initiative stated that actions by the Venezuelan government suggests that the government promotes self-censorship, information control and that changes in Venezuelan law may target websites in government information control efforts.

In May 2015, Juan Carlos Alemán, a Venezuelan official speaking on television, announced that the Venezuelan government was in the process of removing the use of servers from Google and Mozilla and using Venezuelan satellites in order to have more control over the internet of Venezuelans.

By 2017, Freedom House declared in its Freedom on the Net 2017 report that Venezuela's internet was ranked as "not free", citing the blockage of social media applications, political content being blocked, attacks of online reports by law enforcement and the arrests of internet users. Since late-2017, the Venezuelan government censored the website El Pitazo, blocking it with DNS methods.

Following the 2018 Venezuelan presidential election, the website for El Nacional was sanctioned by the state-run CONATEL on 22 May 2018, with the violation of Article 27 of the Social Responsibility in Radio, Television and Electronic Media being cited by the Venezuelan government.

Even left-leaning media outlets have been the target of censorship. Since January 2019, Aporrea.org, which publishes information both in favor and against the government, but which in recent years has published more content critical of the government and its officials, has been blocked in state ISPs.

In October 2020, VEsinFiltro reported that CANTV blocked several pornographic websites until 15 October with a HTTP block. In March 2021 VEsinFiltro reported that once again six pornographic websites were blocked.

On 5 July 2022, pro-government deputy Jesús Faría admitted that the government blocked digital outlets, saying "Just because you have the power and ability to communicate with the population, doesn't give you the power to say whatever you feel like saying."

=== Law ===
Social Responsibility in Radio, Television and Electronic Media Law

In December 2004, the government of Venezuela approved a law named "Social Responsibility in Radio, Television and Electronic Media" (Ley de Responsabilidad Social en Radio, Televisión y Medios Electrónicos). The law is intended to exercise control over content that could "entice felonies", "create social distress", or "question the legitimate constituted authority". The law indicates that the website's owners will be responsible for any information and contents published, and that they will have to create mechanisms that could restrict without delay the distribution of content that could go against the aforementioned restrictions. The fines for individuals who break the law will be of the 10% of the person's last year's income. The law was received with criticism from the opposition on the grounds that it is a violation of freedom of speech protections stipulated in the Venezuelan constitution, and that it encourages censorship and self-censorship.

In November 2013 the Venezuelan telecommunications regulator, the National Commission of Telecommunications (CONATEL), began ordering ISPs to block websites that provide the black market exchange rate. ISPs must comply within 24 hours or face sanctions, which could include the loss of their concessions. Within a month ISPs had restricted access to more than 100 URLs. The order is based on Venezuela's 2004 media law which makes it illegal to disseminate information that could sow panic among the general public.

According to Spanish newspaper El País, CONATEL verifies that ISPs do not allow their subscribers to access content which is "an aggression to the Venezuelan people" and "causes unstabilization", in their criteria. El País also warns that Conatel could force ISPs to block web sites in opposition to the government's interests. It was also reported by El País that there will be possible automations of DirecTV, CANTV, Movistar and possible regulation of YouTube and Twitter.

Following the election establishing the 2017 Constituent National Assembly, the president of the assembly Delcy Rodríguez decreed that there will be "regulation of the emission of messages of hatred and intolerance (and) strong penalties when it is in presence of a crime of hatred and intolerance", singling out opposition politicians while also threatening those who criticized her brother, Jorge Rodriguez. On 8 November 2017, the pro-government Constituent National Assembly approved of increased censorship that would close media organization that promote "hate and intolerance".

=== Currency exchange websites ===
It is disallowed for websites to publish the black market currency exchange rate, as the government claims that this contributes to severe economic problems the country is currently reported to be facing.

In 2013, Venezuelan President Nicolás Maduro banned several internet websites, including DolarToday, to prevent its citizens accessing the country's exchange rates. Maduro, however, accused DolarToday of fueling an economic war against his government and manipulating the exchange rate.

=== 2014 protests ===
During the 2014 Venezuelan protests, it was reported that Internet access was unavailable in San Cristóbal, Táchira for up to about half a million citizens. Multiple sources claimed that the Venezuelan government blocked Internet access. Internet access was reported to be available again one day and a half later.

=== Social media ===
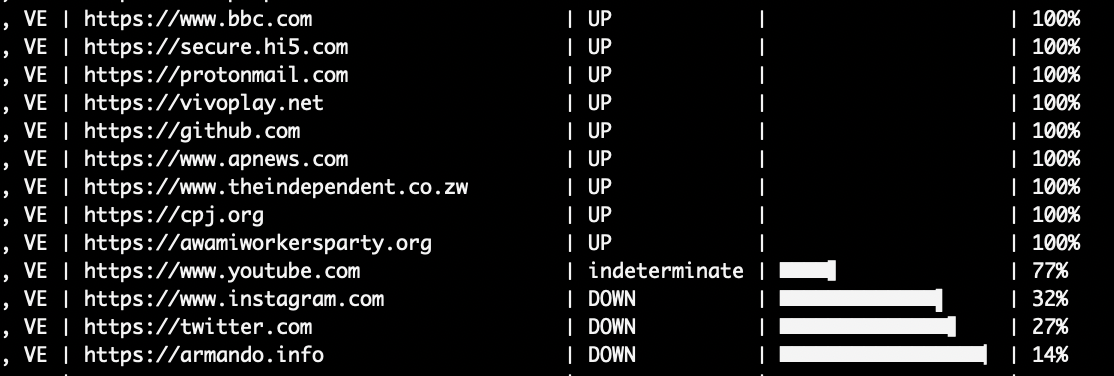
NetBlocks showing blocks of Instagram, Twitter and YouTube on 21 January 2019

Social media has played a pivotal role in the fight for democracy and human rights in Venezuela. "As Nicolás Maduro's authoritarian government has overseen Venezuela's collapse into unprecedented economic and humanitarian crisis since 2014, it has tried to restrict citizens’ access to information." Most of the television channels and the radio stations that cover the country's situation are state-run, this gives the government control over the majority of the information that circulates. Social media has allowed politicians, activists, journalists and civilians, to record and publish incidents of injustices perpetrated by the Venezuelan authorities on countless occasions, especially during the opposition's protests or demonstrations where the National Bolivarian Guard (GNB) and the National Bolivarian Police (PNB) often attack civilians without accountability. These types of incidents are very unlikely to appear on television, broadcast on radio or printed in newspapers because of the restrictions and control that the government has on national traditional media, whereas it is harder to control what gets published on social media because the government does not have control over social media platforms. When printing paper stopped being available, some newspapers turned to social media communication to share the news. According to Venezuelan journalist Jorge Lander, social media channels are "basically the only windows Venezuelans have to know what's going on in the country."

Social media has been censored by the Bolivarian government on multiple occasions. The Bolivarian government stated that it must "conquer the fourth generation war" against them, with the government monitoring the Facebook, Instagram and Twitter profiles of their workers. In one case, the Ministry of Urban Agriculture forced public employees in August 2017 to email their social media usernames to managers and supervisors. In January 2019, anonymous officials of CICPC stated that they were required to support the Bolivarian government and that officials who support the opposition on social media would have their employment terminated.

One of the largest outages was reported on 21 January 2019 during the 2019 Venezuelan presidential crisis. Internet access to Instagram, Twitter and YouTube was reported to be blocked by state-run provider CANTV.

==== Twitter ====
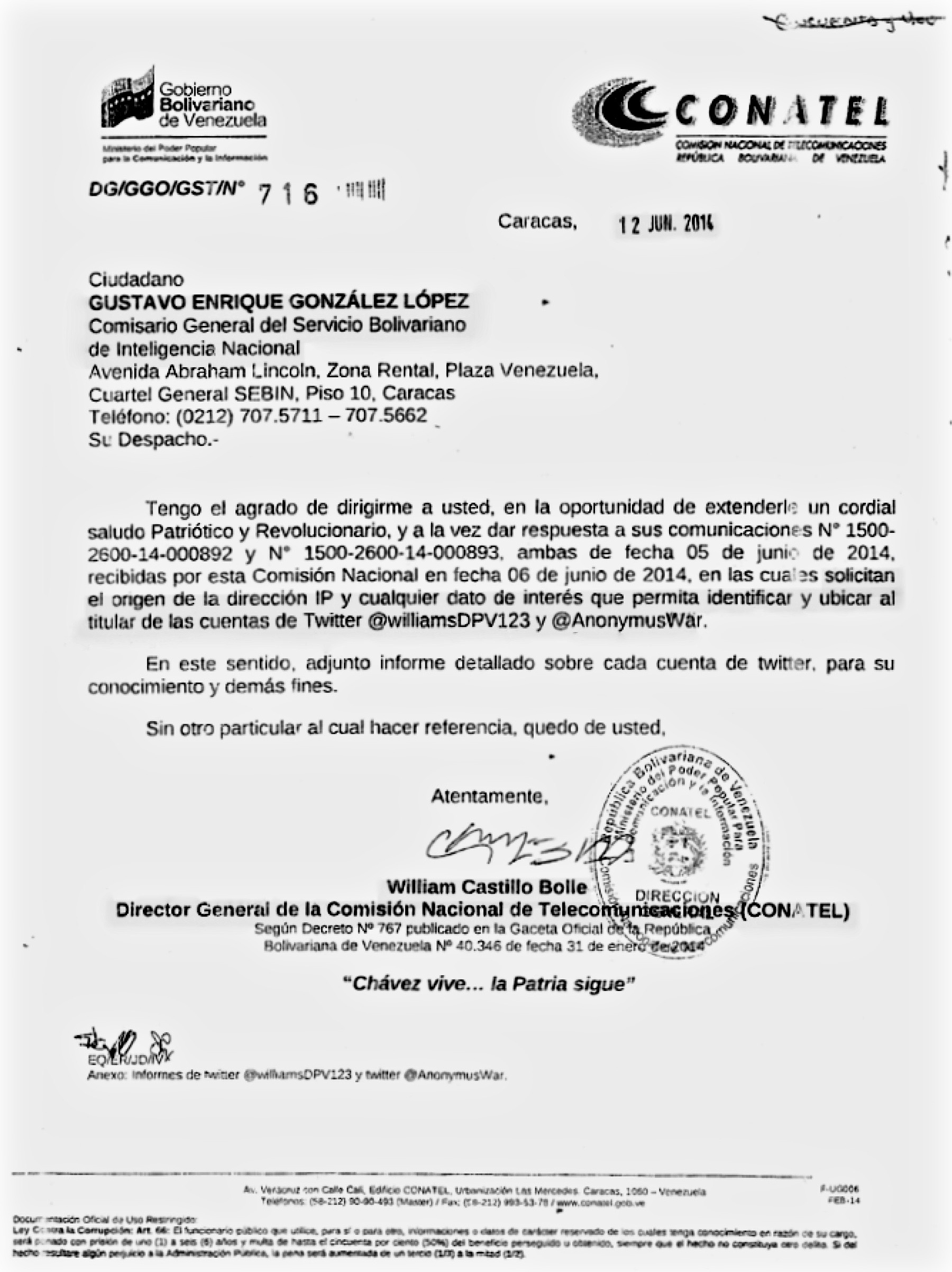
A communication from General Director of CONATEL, William Castillo Bolle, giving the IP addresses and other information of Venezuelan Twitter users to SEBIN General Commissioner Gustavo González López.

Twitter has been targeted and criticized by the Venezuelan government under both Chavez's and Maduro's administrations because it is a major tool used to circulate information that would otherwise be censored, and because it has been a known tool used by opposition leaders to communicate and organize their activism. "Governments view Twitter as both a threat and an opportunity. Venezuelan president Hugo Chavez equated using Twitter to terrorism before he joined the website himself and became the most followed user in Venezuela."

Like any other social media platform, Twitter has its significant limitations, like the spread of false information. However, Venezuelans must take their chances, otherwise they might not receive any accurate information at all.

Also during the 2014 Venezuelan protests, images on Twitter were reported to be unavailable for at least some users in Venezuela for 3 days (12–15 February), with claims that the Venezuelan government blocked them, indicating that it appeared to be an attempt to limit images of protests against shortages and the world's highest inflation rate. Twitter spokesman Nu Wexler stated that, "I can confirm that Twitter images are now blocked in Venezuela" adding that "[w]e believe it's the government that is blocking".

In 2014, multiple Twitter users were arrested and faced prosecution due to the tweets they made. Alfredo Romero, executive director of the Foro Penal, stated that the arrests of Twitter users in Venezuela was a measure to instill fear among those using social media that were critical against the government. In October 2014, eight Venezuelans were arrested shortly after the death of PSUV official Robert Serra. Though the eight Venezuelans were arrest in October 2014, the Venezuelan government had been monitoring them since June 2014 in leaked documents with the state telecommunications agency, Conatel, providing IP addresses and other details to the Venezuelan intelligence agency SEBIN in order to arrest Twitter users.

On 27 February 2019, internet monitoring group NetBlocks reported the blocking of Twitter and SoundCloud by state-run internet provider CANTV for a duration of 40 minutes. The outage followed the sharing of a tweet made by opposition leader Juan Guaidó linking to a highly critical recording posted to SoundCloud consistent with the pattern of brief, targeted filtering of other social platforms during the presidential crisis.

On 1 May 2019 the same group reported blocks of the Twitter, Google and Bing services by state-run CANTV provider. Blocks followed Guaidó's public speech and were lifted minutes before Maduro's scheduled speech was started.

==== Zello ====
The company Zello announced that CANTV blocked the use of its walkie-talkie app which is used by the opposition. In an interview with La Patilla, Chief Technology Officer of Zello, Alexey Gavrilov, said that after they opened four new servers for Venezuela, it still appeared that the same direct blocking from CANTV is the cause of the Zello outage. The government said Zello was blocked due to "terrorist acts" and made statements on TeleSUR about radical opposition after monitoring staged messages from "Internet trolls" that used a Honeypot trap against authorities.

=== Wikipedia ===
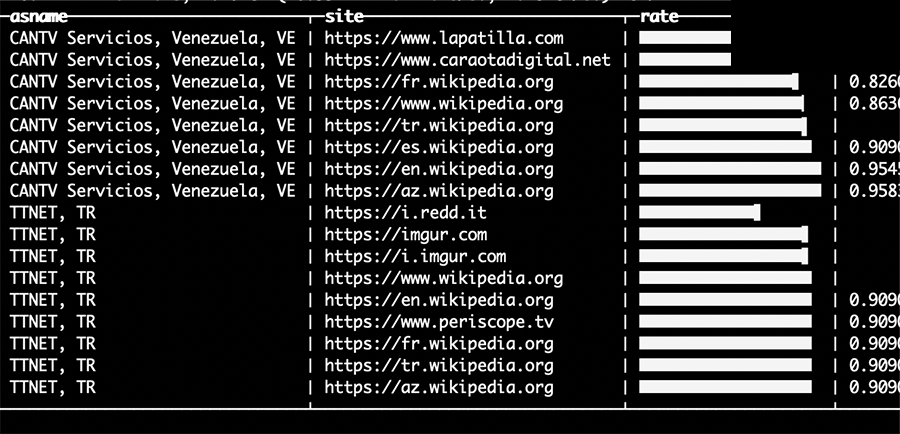
NetBlocks report of the developing incident of blocking of Wikipedia in Venezuela by CANTV as of 12 January 2019

In the evening of 12 January 2019, the NetBlocks internet observatory had collected technical evidence of the blocking of all editions of Wikipedia in Venezuela. The restrictions were being implemented by CANTV, the largest telecommunications provider in the country. NetBlocks identified a major network disruption affecting the telecommunications infrastructure, which coincided with other restrictions affecting Venezuelans’ ability to communicate and access information during the previous 24 hours. The cause is believed to be an attempt to suppress a Wikipedia article that listed newly appointed National Assembly president Juan Guaidó as "president number 51 of the Bolivarian Republic of Venezuela." The collected data also showed that a number of local websites had been recently restricted, indicating that recent political instability could be the underlying cause for what may be a tightening regime of internet control.

==== Human rights violations in 2022 ====
On October 17, 2022, Óscar Costero, a renowned Wikipedian, visited the main office of the Administrative Service of Identification, Migration, and Immigration (SAIME) in Caracas due to online complications renewing his passport. What initially seemed like a routine administrative procedure quickly escalated into a series of human rights violations. Upon his arrival, Costero was informed of an alleged "exit ban" from the country. An unidentified officer kept him waiting for hours, eventually forcing him to sign a statement indicating he was under investigation and had not been mistreated during his time at SAIME. Matters took a turn for the worse when, without warning, he was arrested by the Scientific, Penal and Criminal Investigation Corps (CICPC) and taken for questioning. The interrogation focused on his personal life, finances, affiliation with Wikimedia, and his association with Santiago De Viana, a Wikipedia editor who focused on political topics. It emerged that De Viana had been a target of defamation, accused of corruption and links to drug trafficking. Costero was also mentioned in these defamation attempts. These incidents are believed to stem from a targeted campaign that began after the 2019 blackout, intensifying against Costero, De Viana, and Wikimedia Venezuela by the year's end. Despite his release, Costero faced movement restrictions and continued denial of his basic rights. On November 11, 2022, lawyers from Espacio Público attempted to access the case file but faced obstruction from judicial authorities. Multiple irregularities piled up, including a lack of clarity about specific charges and a rejected protection request filed in January 2023. A court ruled that no harm was inflicted on Costero. Costero's defense has repeatedly demanded full access to the case file, emphasizing that his rights have already been severely breached.

==== Wikipedia controversy ====
Tension arose from an editorial conflict over Juan Guaidó's Wikipedia biography. Editors couldn't agree on whether Guaidó should be recognized as Venezuela's president. This "edit war" prompted the government to temporarily block Wikipedia access in the country. While Wikimedia Venezuela sought clarity about the block's reasons, access was restored a week later without an official explanation.

==== Detention and violation of due process ====
In October 2022, Oscar Costero was arbitrarily detained when trying to renew his passport. During detention, he was questioned about his personal life, finances, and relations with Wikimedia and Santiago De Viana. This act was denounced by the NGO Espacio Público, which deemed the detention a violation of due process. Additionally, it's alleged that Costero was baselessly accused of money laundering and inciting hatred.

==== Defamation campaign ====
De Viana became particularly susceptible to defamation due to a pseudonym he used on Wikipedia, closely linked to his real name. From this, an anonymous blog launched a defamation campaign, labeling him as a "Wikipedia blackmailer." These unverified reports also linked the editors to drug trafficking activities.

==== Repercussions and response ====
The NGO Espacio Público has actively defended Oscar Costero's rights, demanding case transparency. The organization underscores freedom of expression and association's significance, highlighting their importance in a democratic society's existence. The Costero and De Viana case illustrates the precarious state of freedom of expression in certain regions, spotlighting the challenges faced by those contributing to free and objective information dissemination.

==== 2024 presidential election ====
During the 2024 Venezuelan presidential election, TechRadar reported that websites, including Wikipedia and voting information websites, were blocked beginning on 28 July.

== Attacks and threats against journalists ==
El Diario de Caracas' editor Rodolpho Schmidt was arrested in 1986 and only released after the paper agreed to remove Schmidt and other critics as well as ceasing stories on corruption. Editor Victor Manuel Gonzalez of the small region newspaper El Espectador de Guayana was arrested in 1987 and sentenced to three years in prison after he reported on corruption. In January 1988, thousands of press workers marched in Caracas to denounce the censorship of the Lusinchi administration. Some reporters received death threats after reporting on corruption of the government and police forces.

=== 2014 protests ===
At the start of the 2014 Venezuelan protests, on 15 February, a Globovisión reporter and her workmates denounced being attacked with stones while covering a pro-government protests at Plaza Venezuela, in Caracas. On 22 April 2014, reporters from La Patilla that were covering events in Santa Fe were retained by the National Guard. The team of reporters were accused of being "fake journalists", had to show their ID's to the National Guardsmen and had their pictures taken. They were later released without further complications. In another incident, a photojournalist from La Patilla was assaulted by National Police who tried to take his camera and hit him in the head with the butt of a shotgun while he covering protests in Las Mercedes. A week after being attacked in Las Mercedes, the same photojournalist for La Patilla was assaulted by the National Police again who tried to take his camera while covering protests in the Las Minitas neighborhood in Baruta. While covering protests on 14 May, a group of reporters said they were assaulted by the National Guard saying they were fired at and that the National Guard attempted to arrest a reporter. On 27 May 2014, a reporter for La Patilla was attacked for the third time while covering clashes when he was shot by the National Guard. Two reporters were injured on 5 June after being shot with buckshot coming from a National Guard vehicle and reported it to Lieutenant Colonel Rafael Quero Silva of the National Guard, who denied their accounts. On 3 July 2014, during a protest near the Catholic University of Táchira, an NTN24 reporter said he was arrested, beaten and had his passport and ID taken by National Police officers.

=== 2017 protests ===
In the early days of the protests on 12 April, the Committee to Protect Journalists (CPJ) issued an advisory to journalists, stating:

Local and international journalists covering the protests have been attacked, beaten, arrested and sprayed with tear gas, and have had their equipment confiscated and stolen. ... Journalists covering the story told the CPJ that the authorities have been firing tear gas into the crowds at close range. ... Local and international media have found it increasingly difficult to operate in Venezuela due to government obstruction. Police and armed pro-government gangs have detained, harassed and attacked journalists. Assaults have taken place in broad daylight, and pro-government gangs have stolen media equipment.

The CPJ offered advice on how to avoid aggression, how to react to tear gas and how to contact the organization to report any attacks on journalists.

During the Mother of All Marches, an El Nacional reporter was robbed by a Bolivarian National Police officer. The following day, more than 50 government sympathizers attacked three El Nacional journalists on 20 April, near La India, beating them with sticks while also throwing rocks and bottles at them. Another journalist captured the attack on film.

On 6 May during a women's march, reporters were attacked by state authorities throughout the country. In San Carlos, Cojedes, Alexander Olvera was kicked by a National Guardsman while covering a protest. A reporter for El Pitazo, Yessica Sumoza, was robbed of her equipment in Caracas, while in Aragua, local police struck reporter Gaby Aguilar in the face with a stone. Alexander Medina of Radio Fe y Alegría, meanwhile, was surrounded by authorities in San Fernando, Apure, who threatened to lynch the reporter.

During protests on 8 May, there were 19 reports of attacks on journalists, with 5 instances involving protesters attempting to rob reporters, while the other 15 reports involved Venezuelan authorities and colectivos.

On 10 May, 27-year-old Miguel Castillo Bracho, a journalist who had graduated the previous week, died after being shot in the chest with a metal sphere by a National Guardsman. On 18 May, four journalists were attacked by the National Guard and had their equipment stolen, including Eugenio García of Spain, Herminia Rodríguez of Globovisión, Andry Rincón of VIVOPlay and Kevin Villamizar of El Nacional.

During the 20 May protests, a graphic journalist of La Patilla was injured in Chacaíto after being shot in the leg with a tear gas canister.

=== Presidential crisis ===
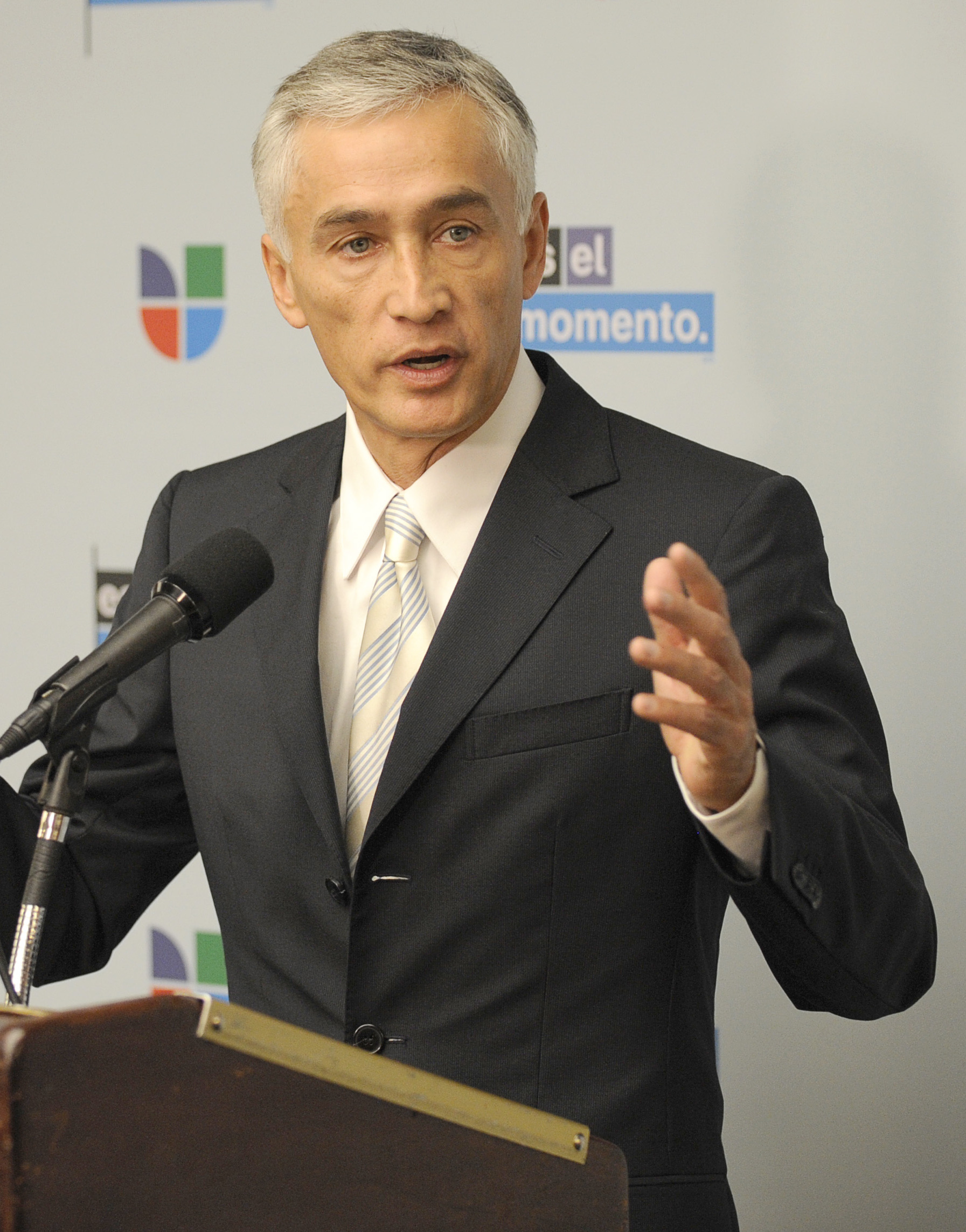
Univision anchor Jorge Ramos was detained by the Maduro administration in February 2019 after a live interview.

Two journalists—Beatriz Adrián of Caracol Televisión and Osmary Hernández of CNN—were detained while on-air and covering the 13 January detention of Guaidó.

Between 29 and 30 January, at least eleven press personnel were arrested. On the evening of 29 January, four journalists were arrested by the Maduro government while reporting near the Miraflores presidential palace—Venezuelan journalists Ana Rodríguez of VPI TV and Maiker Yriarte of TV Venezuela, and Chilean journalists Rodrigo Pérez and Gonzalo Barahona of TVN Chile. The two Venezuelan journalists were released; the Chilean journalists were deported.

Two French journalists from French TV show, Quotidien, and their Venezuelan producer were detained for two days at El Helicoide on 30 January. Three press workers of EFE were also arrested by SEBIN and DGCIM—a Colombian photographer, a Colombian companion, and a Spanish companion.

During 23 February clashes, there were numerous reports of Venezuelan authorities and paramilitaries attacking press workers, including workers of the Associated Press, Ecos del Torbes, La Prensa de Lara, Telemundo, TVVenezuela, VIVOplay, VPItv and others.

Jorge Ramos, who The Guardian described as "arguably the best-known journalist in the Spanish-speaking world", was detained along with his Univisión crew members during an interview with Maduro on 25 February.

Telemundo journalist Daniel Garrido was detained for eight hours by SEBIN on 26 February and was later irregularly released on a side street in Caracas.

US freelance journalist Cody Weddle and his Venezuelan coworker Carlos Camacho were detained for half a day on 6 March after Weddle house was raided and his equipment confiscated by military counterintelligence forces. US diplomats demanded Venezuelan authorities for Weddle's release. Weddle was deported afterwards.

During the 2019 Venezuelan blackouts, Venezuelan–Spanish journalist Luis Carlos Díaz was arrested at his home by SEBIN forces, and taken along with his electronic equipment to El Helicoide.

Gazeta Wyborcza Polish journalist, Tomas Surdel, was briefly detained, threatened, and beaten, by FAES forces during the blackout, according to the Venezuelan press workers union.

German journalist Billy Six, who was detained in El Helicoide since 17 November 2018 charged of espionage, rebellion and security violations, was allowed to leave Venezuela on 16 March. He must report to court every 15 days and he cannot speak to the media about his detention. Reporters Without Borders had previously considered the allegations unproven and called for his release.

The Venezuelan press workers union denounced that in 2019, 40 journalists had been illegally detained as of 12 March; the National Assembly Parliamentary Commission for Media declared that there had been 173 aggressions against press workers as of 13 March. The commission planned to report these aggressions to the International Criminal Court.

Punto de Corte journalists Johan Álvarez and Alexandra Villán were hit by a car in Caracas when riding a motorcycle after the journalists published an undercover report about several problems of CANTV, a state owned telecommunication company; Punto de Corte was blocked in Venezuela after the report was published and both journalists were threatened before being hit.

== Legal barriers ==
=== Law on Social Responsibility of Radio and Television ===
The Law on Social Responsibility of Radio and Television (Ley de Responsabilidad de Radio y Televisión in Spanish) entered into force in December 2004. Its stated aim is to "strike a democratic balance between duties, rights, and interests, in order to promote social justice and further the development of the citizenry, democracy, peace, human rights, education, culture, public health, and the nation's social and economic development."

Supporters of the law and detractors have debated its significance in terms of freedom of expression and journalism in the country. Some complained about the fact that it limits violent and sexual content on television and radio during daytime hours in order to protect children. For example, Human Rights Watch argued that these limits are not fair for broadcasters, "making it necessary for them to present a sanitized version of the news during the day". It also suggested that "insult laws" in articles 115, 121 and 125 of the bill could result in political censorship.

=== Broadcast licences ===
In May 2007, controversies on press freedom were further exacerbated when RCTV (Radio Caracas Television)'s terrestrial broadcast licence expired, with the government declining to renew it. An article by Reporters Without Borders stated that:

"Reporters Without Borders condemns the decision of the Venezuela Supreme Court to rule an appeal by Radio Caracas Televisión (RCTV) against the loss of its license as "inadmissible". The appeal, lodged on 9 February 2007, was rejected on 18 May, putting a stop to any further debate. President Hugo Chávez said on 28 December 2006 that he would oppose renewal of the group's broadcast license, accusing the channel of having supported the 11 April 2002 coup attempt in which he was briefly removed from office. According to the government the license expired on 27 May 2007, a date contested by RCTV, which insists its license is valid until 2022. Without waiting for the 27 May or the Supreme Court's decision, Hugo Chávez on 11 May awarded RCTV's channel 2 frequency by decree to a new public service channel, Televisora Venezolana Social (TVes)".

This government action fueled student demonstrations and contentious forms of political demonstrations.

After the closure of the TV station in 2007, the station launched a new channel named RCTV International that was broadcast on cable/satellite TV. Following its move to cable, RCTV relaunched itself as RCTV International, in an attempt to escape the regulation of the Venezuelan media law. In January 2010 CONATEL concluded that RCTV met that criterion (being more than 90% domestic according to CONATEL), and reclassified it as a domestic media source, and therefore subject to the requirements to broadcast state announcements, known as cadenas. Along with several other cable providers, RCTV refused to do so and was sanctioned with temporary closure. It reopened on cable, which is widely available in Venezuela. Other sanctioned channels include the American Network, America TV and TV Chile. TV Chile, an international channel of Chilean state television, had failed to respond to a January 14 deadline for clarifying the nature of its content.

=== Law Against Hatred ===
In 2019, after a campaign in media outlets and social media by progovernment movements, the pro-government Supreme Tribunal of Justice of Venezuela, through a Caracas court, ordered the ban of the screening of the documentary Chavismo: The Plague of the 21st Century, directed by Gustavo Tovar-Arroyo, at the Simón Bolívar University (USB) specifically, as well as at public universities and other public spaces in general, in response to the request of a prosecutor investigating it as an alleged hate crime or as inciting hate crimes, established in the Law against Hatred approved by the Constituent Assembly. The Teachers' Association of USB responded by saying: "The regime's tribunal is a pretender and silences the freedom of speech once more in Venezuela. USB academics are affected because the university is forced to stop a screening. We expect domestic and international support." Tovar-Arroyo described the ban of his documentary as a "success without precedent", because now students will want to watch the documentary more.

== Case studies ==
=== Ángel Sarmiento ===
In September 2014, the President of the State Bar Association of Medical Doctors in Aragua, Ángel Sarmiento, pronounced on the radio eight people dead of the same unknown disease in a hospital in Maracay. All of the deceased patients exhibited the same symptoms which include, fever, respiratory problems, and a rash. Soon after his public statement he was denounced and discredited by public officials. The governor of Aragua, Tareck El Aissami, immediately accused the doctor of launching a terrorist campaign fueled by anxiety. Not much longer after that Maduro himself publicly condemned the doctor for waging biological and psychological warfare on Venezuela. Both government authorities then asked prosecutors to open an investigation against Sarmiento on grounds of terrorism and for being a "spokesman of the fascist opposition". The Attorney General then appointed a prosecutor for the case with the support of the National Assembly. The official statement from the government on the issue was that this was that they would condemn "media terrorism by right-wing factors of the health sector" and that "psychological terrorism would be severely punished." Two days following his statements, Ángel Sarmiento fled the country and has not returned since.

==== Context ====
"Sarmiento's statements were made at a time when Venezuela was facing a high number of cases of mosquito-transmitted diseases." Amongst other shortages, medical shortages were debilitating hospitals across the country and the government was unable to provide sufficient medical attention for many patients. There are depleted resources such as medical instruments, drugs, and a lack of basic hospital amenities such as sheets. When Doctor Sarmiento declared the reason of death unknown for the eight deceased in the Maracay Hospital, he simultaneously drew more attention to these problems. Eleven days after the outbreak, doctors were finally able to compile enough resources to discover the cause of death. The death was eventually attributed to chikungunya, a mosquito-borne virus that has treatable symptoms. Some officials who were investigating the deaths reported that the fatal incident was an unidentified hemorrhagic fever. However, after analyzing samples in nongovernmental labs report that there is little doubt that it is chikungunya.

==== Social media ====
Social media outlets are important to democracy. In recent years there has been little to no published information regarding parliamentary affairs. This includes the legislative agenda, appropriations, records of representatives’ votes, and session scripts. Aside from that, the government has classified documents and legislative records that bar anyone inquiring from seeing the actual groundwork of the assembly. The administration under Mr. Maduro has recently said that it is important for the government to keep such things classified to protect children. Private and community media outlets have been barred from hosting press conferences and covering assembly activities. There is no coverage of the representative accomplishments, actions taken, or any form of news to validate their words. Instead of encouraging a diverse landscape of opinion and opposition, anything published that is not aligned with government ideals is denounced and discredited, so politicians rely on social media. Citizens, government officials, and media sources alike are all practicing self-censorship in fear of prosecution and ridiculous accusations. Before a tweet has been sent, the politician sending it has politically charged motivations and has to consider the ramifications if he publishes anything dissenting with the government. Otherwise he could face the same fate as Sarmiento. On December 6, 2015, Venezuelans had elections for the National Assembly. For the first time in many years the opposition took majority. The new opposition majority has promised to restore transparency to the government and to limit Mr. Maduro's ability to exercise his extensive powers.

== See also ==
- Censorship during the Bolivarian Revolution
- Media of Venezuela
- Law on Social Responsibility on Radio and Television
- Freedom of speech by country
- List of journalists killed in Venezuela
- 2007 RCTV protests
- 2014 Venezuelan protests
