= 2007 Venezuelan RCTV protests =

Protests against shutdown of TV network

2007 RCTV protests
- Part of Protests against Hugo Chávez
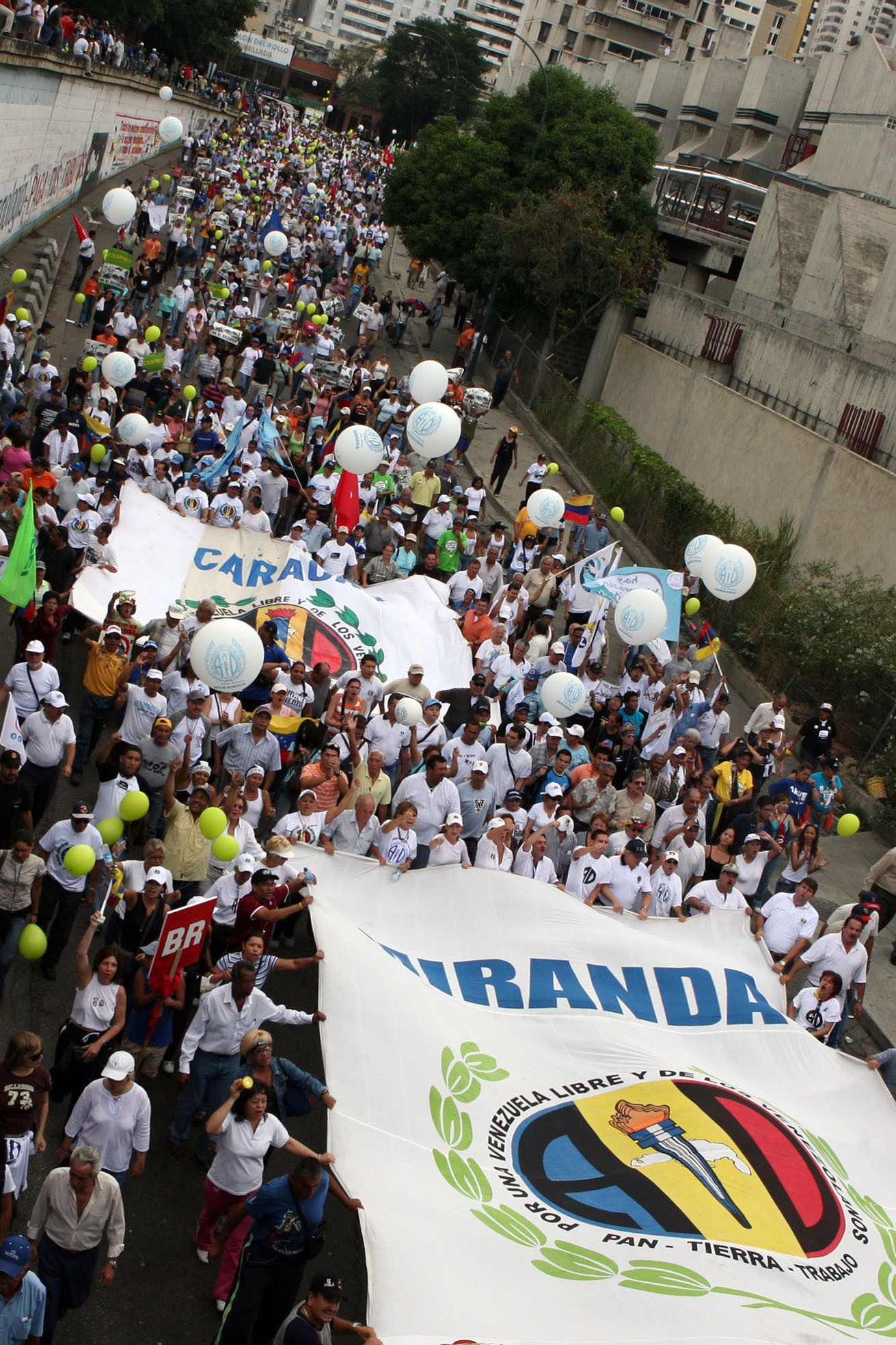
- Venezuelans rally in support of RCTV.
- Date: 19 May – June 2007
- Location: Venezuela
- Caused by: Venezuelan government's shutdown of the RCTV television channel
- Result: RCTV ceased operations on 27 May 2007 at 23:59:59 (UTC-4) and was replaced by TVes, which launched at 00:20:00 on 28 May

Parties
Venezuelan opposition	Government of Venezuela

Number
Tens of thousands; Hundreds of journalists	Tens of thousands

The RCTV protests were a series of protests in Venezuela that began in the middle of May 2007. The cause of the protests was the decision by the government to shut down Venezuela's oldest private television network, Radio Caracas Televisión (RCTV), refusing to renew its broadcasting license and instead creating a new public service channel called TVes, which began operations on 28 May, the same day RCTV's license expired. RCTV had Venezuela's largest viewing audience, with 10 million of the country's 26 million people viewing its shows and soap operas.

== Background ==
On 28 December 2006, President Chávez informed that he would not renew Radio Caracas Televisión's (RCTV) concession, which was due to expire on 27 May 2007, thereby forcing the channel to cease operations on that day. The government argued that the refusal to renew was due to the position taken by RCTV during the 2002 coup attempt. RCTV's directors declared that the channel's concession did not expire until 2021, calling the measure an abuse by the government, and demonstrations in support of the channel took place. The Supreme Tribunal of Justice (TSJ)—controlled by Chávez allies— rejected on 17 April an appeal that argued that the license revocation was illegal and ruled that it was within the National Commission of Telecommunications's power to decide on the issuing, renewal and revocation of broadcast licenses. On 17 May 2007, the government rejected a plea made by RCTV to stop the TV station's forced shutdown.

On 19 May, over 30,000 people gathered in Caracas to protest the decision, while there were also marches in Maracaibo, Puerto La Cruz, Valencia and other main cities in the country. A march in favor of the freedom of expression was organized on 21 May in Caracas, led by students and journalists. The Supreme Tribunal later reaffirmed Chávez's decision that RCTV had to end its transmissions by 27 May.

== Shutdown ==
On 24 May, the Supreme Court ordered RCTV to stop broadcasting as soon as its license expired and approved the government's takeover of all of its equipment and stations, though it would review the station's appeal of the decision. Chávez announced plans to start broadcasting a public service channel, TVes, using the infrastructure that belonged to RCTV. According to the ruling by the Venezuelan Supreme Tribunal of Justice, all RCTV broadcast equipment was to be temporarily controlled by TVes. On 25 May, the Venezuelan government sent troops to RCTV installations to take control of their equipment.

RCTV ended its final day of broadcasting with a rendition of the national anthem performed by network employees and on-air talent, followed by a shot of a pro-RCTV protest. The screen then faded to black. A few seconds later, a series of TVes idents appeared on Channel 2. At 12:20 a.m. VET (04:20 UTC) on 28 May 2007, TVes began its programming with a video recording of the national anthem, performed by a large choir clad in Venezuelan colours and full sized orchestra led by the famous young Venezuelan conductor Gustavo Dudamel. After some network promos, TVes switched to an auditorium, where station president Lil Rodríguez gave a speech to a crowd of Chávez supporters.

== Demonstrations ==
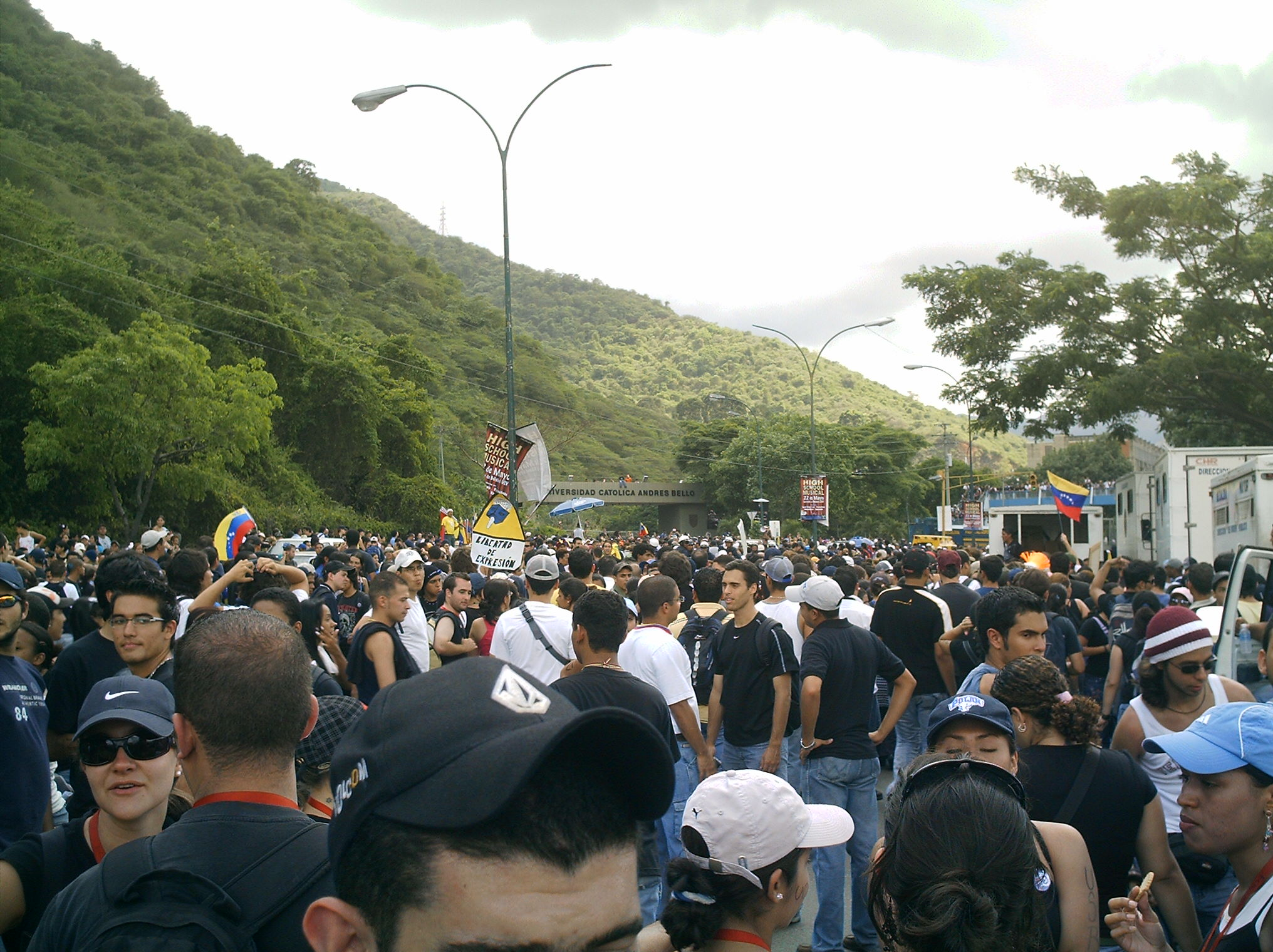
1 June, students of the Universidad Central de Venezuela and Universidad Católica Andrés Bello marching against the government's decision. (photo by: Jesús E. Machado P.)

Thousands of protesters marching both against and in support of the government's decision remained on the streets in Caracas. On 19 May 2007, 30,000 protesters gathered in Caracas protesting the government's decision two days earlier that rejected a plea made by RCTV to stop the TV station's forced shutdown. Other marches took place in Maracaibo and Valencia. On 21 May 2007, hundreds of journalists and students marched in Caracas carrying a banner reading "S.O.S. Freedom of Expression." A few days later, on 25 May 2007, university students from the Universidad Católica Andrés Bello, the Universidad Simón Bolívar and the Universidad Central de Venezuela protested against the government's intentions. On 26 May, tens of thousands of protesters marched in support of RCTV to their headquarters.

Thousands of protestors marched in the streets of Caracas on 27 May for and against RCTV. In the evening, demonstrations in front of Conatel, the National Telecommunications Commission, became violent, with protestors throwing rocks and bottles at police, who responded with tear gas and rubber bullets. At least eleven police officers and one protestor from the incident at Conatel, as well as three students and one police officer from a separate protest at Brión plaza in Caracas, have been reported injured. Twenty other students at Brión plaza were treated for tear gas inhalation.

In the afternoon and evening of 29 May, protests in Caracas and Chacao became violent, with protesters in Chacao blocking Avenida Francisco de Miranda. At least seventeen people have been reported by Globovision to be injured on 29 May. The Inter-American Commission on Human Rights petitioned the Venezuelan government for information about arrested and injured protestors; though the Venezuelan government did not provide the information, saying it would violate the confidentiality of adolescents involved.

On 2 June, tens of thousands marched through Caracas to support President Chávez's decision.

== International reactions ==
Since the week prior to the shutdown of RCTV, many individuals, international organizations and NGOs—including the OAS's Secretary General José Miguel Insulza and its Special Rapporteur for Freedom of Expression, the Inter American Press Association, Human Rights Watch, and the Committee to Protect Journalists,—have expressed concerns for freedom of the press following the shutdown. However, Secretary Insulza also stated that it was up to the Venezuelan courts to solve this dispute and that he believed that this was an administrative decision.

The International Press Institute stated that it is "a flagrant attempt to silence the station's critical voice and in violation of everyone's right 'to seek, receive and impart information and ideas through any media and regardless of frontiers,' as outlined in Article 19 of the UN Universal Declaration of Human Rights" The Committee to Protect Journalists "concluded [Chávez's] government failed to conduct a fair and transparent review of RCTV's concession renewal. The report, based on a three-month investigation, found the government’s decision was a predetermined and politically motivated effort to silence critical coverage." Reporters Without Borders stated "The closure of RCTV [...] is a serious violation of freedom of expression and a major setback to democracy and pluralism. President Chávez has silenced Venezuela’s most popular TV station and the only national station to criticize him, and he has violated all legal norms by seizing RCTV’s broadcast equipment for the new public TV station that is replacing it." Freedom House has given Venezuela a press freedom rating of "Not Free" since 2002, most recently describing a number of new laws, most particularly the 2004 Ley Resorte, that include prohibitions against broadcasting violent material between 5 a.m. and 11 p.m., targeting a group or individual for hatred, and insulting president Chávez, under penalty of severe fines and imprisonment.

The Senate of the United States approved a motion promoted by Senators Richard Lugar and Christopher Dodd condemning the closing, stating that the move was a "transgression of freedom of thought and expression" in Venezuela, while Nancy Pelosi, Speaker of the U.S. House of Representatives, asserted that it was an attempt to silence the critics of the Government. The U.S. State Department, the European Union, the senates of Chile and Brazil, and the legislatures of a number of other Latin American countries have also expressed concern over the incident.

European Commission President José Manuel Durão Barroso qualified the measure as regrettable, adding that "freedom of expression and press freedom are substantial components of democracy." Costa Rican President Óscar Arias Sánchez stated that any media closing was a deathly strike against any democratic system. Chilean President Michelle Bachelet said she regrets the decision and that "freedom of expression is the golden rule." Along with her, Finnish President Tarja Halonen said she was watching the situation with concern. The Spanish Partido Popular, the main opposition party, called the closing an "attack against freedom of expression".

After the Brazilian Senate passed a motion urging Chávez to reconsider the revocation of RCTV's license, Chávez "accused the Brazilian Congress of acting like a 'puppet' of the US", prompting Brazilian President Luiz Inácio Lula da Silva to say "Chavez has to take care of Venezuela, I have to take care of Brazil and Bush has to take care of the US". Later, Lula da Silva said the decision of not renewing the broadcast license was internal Venezuelan business, adding that the legal logic of each country should be respected. Chávez said that presidents Daniel Ortega of Nicaragua and Evo Morales of Bolivia phoned to show support to his decision. President Álvaro Uribe from Colombia said that the country would not involve itself in Venezuela's internal affairs. President Rafael Correa of Ecuador said that he would have canceled the broadcast license automatically (after the 2002 coup).

Responding to Nancy Pelosi, Bernardo Álvarez, the country's ambassador to the United States, described the licensing decision as a simple regulatory matter, which "was not made based on RCTV’s critical editorial stance against the government, nor was it directed at silencing criticism of the government." Álvarez argued that Venezuela wished to adopt a more European model of public broadcasting, he wrote that 79 of 81 Venezuelan television stations, 706 of 709 radio broadcasters, and 118 newspapers remain in private hands, citing a 30 May 2007 op-ed published in the Los Angeles Times: "Radio, TV and newspapers remain uncensored, unfettered and unthreatened by the government. Most Venezuelan media are still staunchly anti-Chávez."

In Nicaragua, followers of Hugo Chávez voiced their support of his closing of RCTV on 27 May in Managua. This small rally was met with negative reactions from local press, who condemned the involvement of the Venezuelan Ambassador Miguel Gómez.

== See also ==
- Media in Venezuela
- Censorship in Venezuela
