= Record Report =

Singles chart in Venezuela

- Industry: Music
- Founded: 1990
- Headquarters: Caracas, Venezuela
- Website: www.recordreport.com.ve

Record Report is the official singles chart for Venezuela founded in 1990 which ranks songs based on airplay.

In 2005, the Law on Social Responsibility on Radio and Television required radio stations to mandatorily include Venezuelan (both traditional and popular) music on their programming. Before the law was passed, music that could be played by Venezuelan radio stations was not restricted by genre.

The chart provides the Top 20 publicly, with the complete list accessible to subscribers. The charts provided are Top 100, Top Tradicional, Top Latino, Top Salsa, Pop Rock Nacional, and Pop Rock General.
