= .ve =

Internet country code top-level domain for Venezuela

- Introduced: 7 March 1991
- TLD type: Country code top-level domain
- Status: Active
- Registry: Comisión Nacional de Telecomunicaciones
- Sponsor: Comisión Nacional de Telecomunicaciones
- Intended use: Entities connected with Venezuela
- Actual use: Popular in Venezuela
- Registration restrictions: second level only for trademark holders, third level mostly unrestricted
- Structure: Registrations are made at the second or third level
- Documents: Terms and conditions
- Registry website: nic.ve

.ve is the Internet country code top-level domain (ccTLD) for Venezuela.

Registrations in the second level were opened in 2024, but are only available for either national or international trademark holders.

Registrations in these third level spaces are allowed without restrictions:

- .arts.ve - artistic and cultural institution
- .co.ve - a website originally ".com" ported to Venezuelan Spanish
- .com.ve - Venezuelan commercial entity
- .info.ve - informational sites
- .net.ve - network service providers
- .org.ve - non-profit organizations
- .radio.ve - radio stations
- .web.ve - individuals

The following third level spaces are restricted:

- .gob.ve / .gov.ve - government-related websites
- .edu.ve - Venezuela based educational institutions
- .int.ve - International institutions
- .mil.ve - Venezuelan military institution
- .tec.ve - University of Technology

Internationalized domain names are available using the following Spanish characters: á, é, í, ó, ú, ü, and ñ.
