= Lil Rodríguez =

Lil del Valle Rodríguez (born 20 January 1952) is a Venezuelan journalist. Her most recent position is president of the board of directors of Caracas-based television station TVes (Televisora Venezolana Social), which began its broadcasting on 27 May 2007, following the controversial non-renewal of the terrestrial broadcast licence of the station which had previously used the frequency.

Lil Rodríguez was born in Caracas during the presidency of Marcos Pérez Jiménez, against whose government her mother was an activist. A part of her childhood was spent in her mother's home town of Cumaná, Estado Sucre, before she returned to the capital to study, first, psychology at the Universidad Central de Venezuela and, subsequently, journalism at the Universidad del Zulia in Estado Zulia. Her speciality is in cultural journalism, and she is an expert in Latin American music, particularly the popular folk music of the Caribbean and Venezuela. She is also an astrologist, after having studied that discipline for 12 years.

She began her working life at the National Library. While employed there she began writing for El Diario de Caracas. She has also written for a string of other newspapers, including El Nacional, El Globo and Últimas Noticias, and she has published one book, Bailando en la casa del trompo, on the topic of Caribbean music.

She has also worked as a radio presenter for several private Venezuelan broadcasters and for the Cuban station Radio Rebelde.
