= Zello =

Software development company

Zello Inc
- Type: Private
- Industry: Mobile application development
- Headquarters: Austin, Texas, U.S.
- Key people: Alexey Gavrilov, CEO
- Products: Zello
- Number of employees: 51-200
- Website: zello.com

Zello is a tech software company in Austin, Texas, U.S., known for the Zello app, which emulates push-to-talk (PTT) walkie-talkies over cell phone networks.

== History ==
Alexey Gavrilov developed the product originally called Loudtalks which was announced at the TechCrunch 40 Mobile and Communications Conference on September 17, 2007. Zello acquired the Loudtalks technology, rebranded, and moved the development team to Austin. It added apps on June 20, 2012. Bill Moore is the CEO and Gavrilov is CPO. Moore founded and was CEO of TuneIn where Gavrilov and his team created popular TuneIn applications.

Zello made the news in June 2013 when Turkish protesters used it to circumvent government censors. As a result, Zello was the top most downloaded application in Turkey during the first week of June 2013.

In February 2014, it was blocked by CANTV in Venezuela. Zello released workarounds and patches to overcome the blocks to support approximately 600,000 Venezuelans who have downloaded the application to communicate with each other amidst protests. It "has been one of the most downloaded applications in Ukraine and Venezuela."

In July 2017, in Latvia, Zello was the main application which was used by thousands of volunteers and rescuers for communication purposes while looking for Ivan Berladin who went missing.

In August 2017 during relief efforts following Hurricane Harvey in Texas, Zello became a popular method for communications between volunteer rescuers (particularly members of the Cajun Navy) and people stranded by the widespread flooding. The app received over 6 million signups in one week as Florida residents responded to hurricane warnings for Hurricane Irma.

In September 2018, while Hurricane Florence caused unprecedented flooding in the US states of North and South Carolina, rescuers used Zello to request information about the locations of people needing help and on street conditions.

Some rioters who broke into the U.S. Capitol building during the 2021 United States Capitol attack used Zello, leading the company to delete over 2,000 "channels associated with militias and other militarized social movements" after The Guardian revealed the usage. On August 27, 2021, the U.S. House of Representatives select committee investigating the attack demanded records from Zello (alongside 14 other social media companies) going back to the spring of 2020.

Members of the Freedom Convoy 2022 almost exclusively used Zello to communicate with other members and supporters.

Participants in the Kenya Finance Bill protests that began in June 2024 have used Zello as their app of choice for communicating anonymously in real time. Over 40,000 users in Kenya downloaded the Zello app from the Google Play store between June 17 and June 25, peaking at the fourth most downloaded app in the country on June 25. According to political scientist Herman Manyora of the University of Nairobi, the use of Zello made the protest one of the most effective in the country's history. President William Ruto acknowledged the use of Zello by protesters on July 2.

On 2 December 2024, Zello advised all its users to change their passwords after a suspected cybersecurity breach.

On 6 December 2025, Zello was used to help locate the alleged murderer of two young women in Kaunas, Lithuania — Benas Mikutavičius. People created a public channel in the Zello app called “Raskime žudiką” (“Let’s find the killer”) to coordinate a search for him and thanks to fast voice messages over Zello, dozens of residents converged on the area and managed to detain him before the police arrived.

== Products ==
Zello is a live voice push-to-talk communication platform that turns any smart device into a digital two-way radio that works over Wi-Fi and cell networks anywhere in the world. Purpose-built to connect frontline teams and communities, the push-to-talk walkie-talkie app offers instant voice communication with one or many in unlimited secure, private channels, as well as message replay, emergency alerts, location tracking, dispatch capabilities, and Bluetooth device support.

Zello users can create channels and give control to other Zello users to become moderators. New York Times' technology columnist David Pogue describes Zello's channels, "Like most of the best applications, Zello lets you create groups so that you can carry on something like a party-line phone call among a handful—or hundreds—of friends or collaborators."

Once a channel is created channels can appear on the "Trending" list and creators can assign additional moderators to keep their created channels safe. Though available for Android, iOS, Windows Phone, and Blackberry, Zello can also be accessed from a Windows PC computer with the Zello for Windows PC. For other smartphone operating systems (e.g., Sailfish OS) there are Zello-compatible apps provided by third parties.

Zello Work is the paid service of Zello app that allows corporates and users looking for real-time communication over groups and channels. Zello Work is different from Zello, although owned by the same company.

== See also ==
- Glide (software)
- Mumble (software)
- Voxer
