= DW Español =

Deutsche Welle for the Americas

- Broadcast area: Americas

Programming
- Language: Spanish
- Picture format: 16:9

Ownership
- Owner: DW

Links
- Website: www.dw.com/es/actualidad/s-30684

DW Español is the regional version of official German TV Deutsche Welle for the Americas. The program orients itself towards news and information and was relaunched on 6 February 2012. The program is broadcast via cable and satellite and produced in Berlin.

== History ==
DW-TV began as RIAS-TV, a television station launched by the West Berlin broadcaster RIAS (Radio in the American Sector / Rundfunk im Amerikanischen Sektor) in August 1988.

The fall of the Berlin Wall the following year and German reunification in 1990 meant that RIAS-TV was to be closed down.

On 1 April 1992, Deutsche Welle inherited the RIAS-TV broadcast facilities, using them to start a German- and English-language television channel broadcast via satellite, DW-TV, adding a short Spanish broadcast segment in November of the same year. In 1995 it began 24-hour operation (12 hours German, 10 hours English, 2 hours Spanish).

At that time DW-TV introduced a new news studio and a new logo. Since 6 February 2012 Deutsche Welle made a corporate relaunch and uses the abbreviation DW for all its services. At the very same time Deutsche Welle revised the complete TV program, since 2012 the Latin American desk airs 20 hours of Spanish program daily, and from 30 September 2013 it broadcasts 24 hours in Spanish.

== Reception ==
DW Español broadcasts programming produced both in Berlin and Latin America. In 2012, the network launched its own YouTube channel. DW (Español) is available on Intelsat-21.

== Programmes ==
=== Business ===
- Global Es (Globalisation Program)
- Hecho en Alemania (German Business Magazine)
- Economía Actual (Economy News)

=== Culture ===
- Cultura.21 (Spanish version of Kultur.21)
- Kino (The German Film Magazine with Carol Guerrero)

=== Documentaries and features ===
- Custión de fé (The Church Programme)
- ZonaDocu (Documentaries and Reports)

=== Lifestyle and entertainment ===
- Euromaxx (Lifestyle)
- En forma (The Health Show)
- Enlaces (Living in the Digital Age)
- Destino Alemania (German Travel Magazine, Spanish version of Hin&Weg)
- Escápate (German travel guide)
- popXtra (The German Music Magazine)
- Alemania con acento (Latinos living in Germany)
- Alemania hoy (Window on Germany)

=== News and politics ===
- Europa semanal (The Magazine From Brussels)
- DW Noticias – central edition aired at 6 pm EST and 9 pm EST. Was known until 2015 as Journal – (The DW News Programme)
- Berlín político (The Political Magazine)

=== Talk shows ===
- Cuadriga (The International Talk Show)
- Claves (The Latin American Talk Show hosted by Gonzalo E. Cáceres)
- Agenda (Three key issues, three guests – hosted by former Chilean Megavisión presenter Jenny Pérez)

=== Science ===
- Visión Futuro (Science Journal)

=== Sports and cars ===
- Todo Gol avance (The Football Magazine – fixture preview)
- RPM (The Motor Magazine)
- Todo gol (The Football Magazine)

== Staff ==
Editors:

- Carlos Delgado Kettner, Head of Department
- Eduardo Mendez Gaa, Deputy Head of Department (Twitter: @mendezgaa)
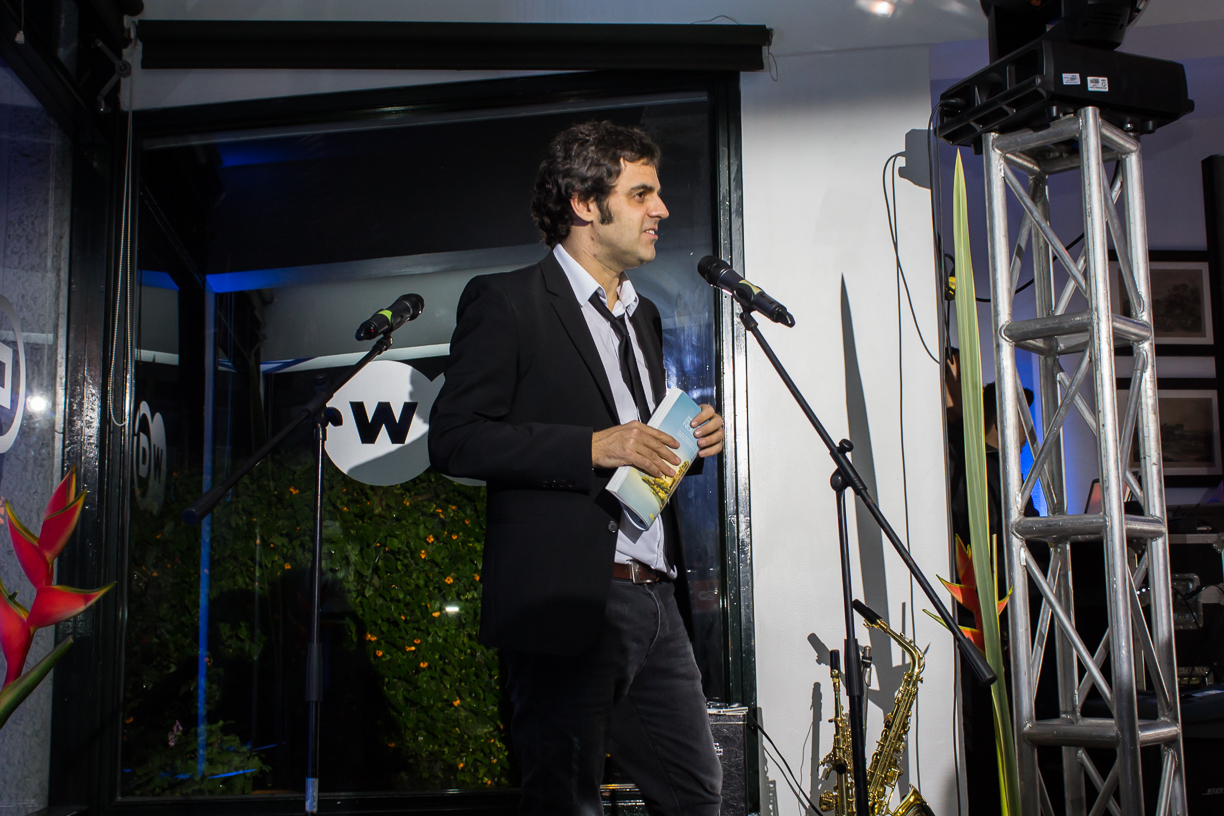
  DW's Latinoamerica's Deputy Head, Eduardo Mendez, presents DW's Sustainability Award 2013 in Bogota, Colombia.

Anchor:

- Jenny Perez-Schmidt
- Silvia Cabrera (Twitter: @SCabreraS)
- Javier Arguedas
- Carol Guerrero Santos
- Ana Plasencia
- Rosa Casals (Twitter: @casalsr)
- Pía Castro
- Neus Pérez

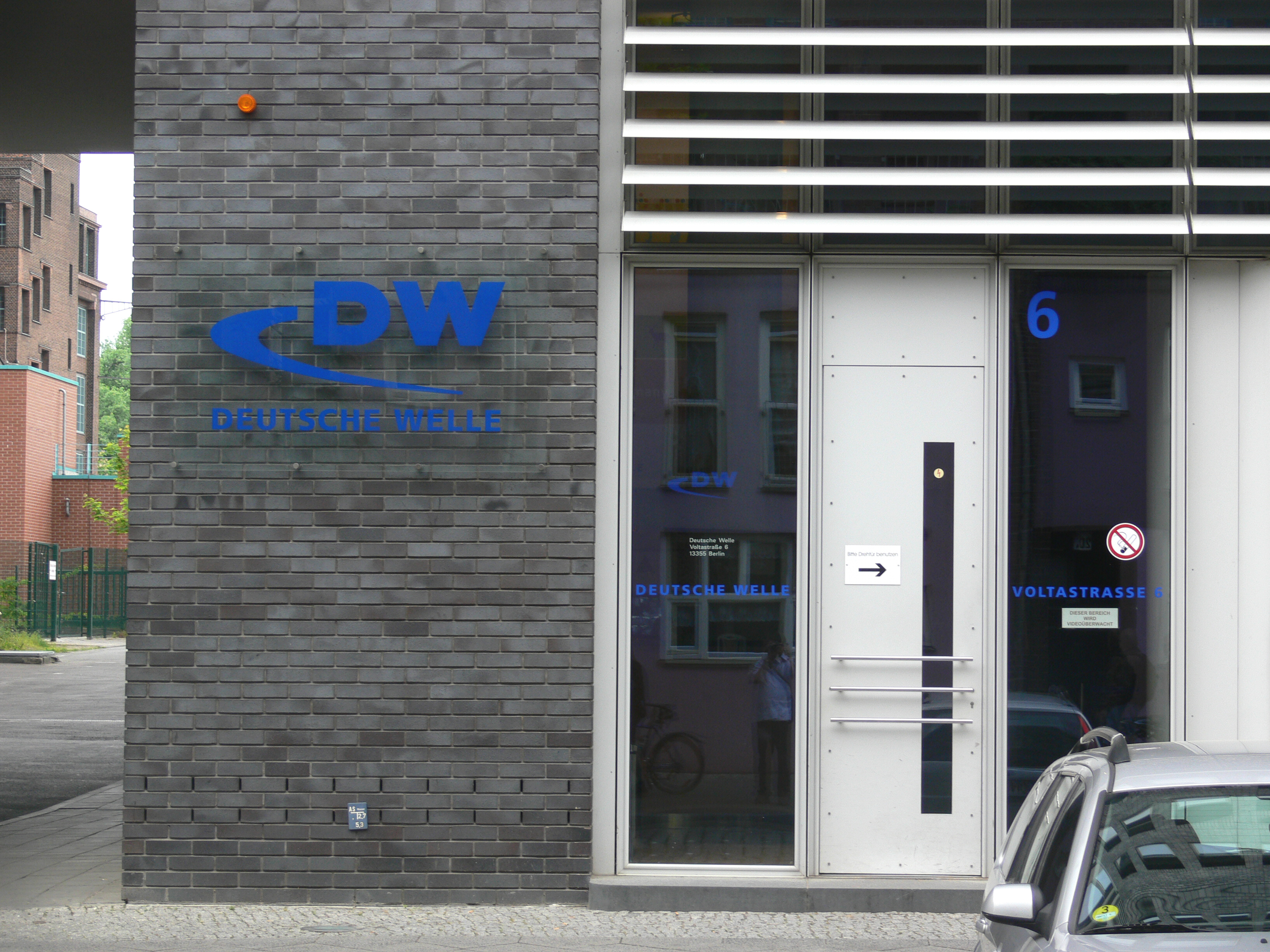
DW-TV building in Berlin.

DW-TV logo to the 5 February 2012

== Time schedule ==
Country	UTC
Argentina, Brazil (southwest), Chile (summer), Uruguay	UTC−3
Bolivia, Western Brazil, Chile, Paraguay, Venezuela, US (East coast, summer)	UTC−4
Colombia, Ecuador, Panama, Mexico (central, summer), US (East Coast; Central, summer), Peru	UTC−5
Guatemala, El Salvador, Costa Rica, Mexico (central), US (Central; Mountain, summer), Honduras	UTC−6
Mexico (Sinaloa, Sonora etc.); US (Mountain; Pacific, summer)	UTC−7
Mexico (Baja California) US (Pacific)	UTC−8
