= CANTV =

Telecommunications company in Venezuela

Compañía Anónima Nacional de Teléfonos de Venezuela
- Logo used since 2007
- Trade name: CANTV
- Type: Public
- Traded as: BVC: TDV.D; NYSE: VNT
- Industry: Telecommunications
- Founded: July 20, 1930; 96 years ago
- Headquarters: Caracas, Venezuela
- Key people: Manuel Fernández (President); Ernesto Paiva (CEO)
- Products: Wireline and Wireless telecommunication Internet service provider
- Parent: Government of Venezuela
- Subsidiaries: Movilnet
- Website: https://www.cantv.com.ve

CANTV (Compañía Anónima Nacional de Teléfonos de Venezuela) is the state-run telephone and internet service provider in Venezuela. It was one of the first telephone service enterprises in the country, founded in 1930. The largest telecommunications provider in Venezuela, it was privatized in 1991, and re-nationalized in 2007 by Hugo Chávez.

As of May 9, 2008, Cantv’s customer base numbered 10.1 million mobile subscribers, 5.2 million fixed telephony subscribers and 1 million broadband subscribers.

== History ==
=== Origins ===
In 1930 the "Ministerio de Fomento" under President Juan Vicente Gómez administration, granted a concession to Félix A. Guerrero to build and operate a telephone network in the Federal District and the States of the Union. With fellow shareholders Manuel Pérez Abascal, an entrepreneur, and Alfredo Damirón, an attorney, they registered Compañía Anónima Nacional Teléfonos de Venezuela on 20 June 1930.

On 31 December it became the local operating company for the assets of the Venezuelan Telephone and Electrical Appliances Company Limited, an English firm which had been operating in Venezuela for 40 years between Caracas and Puerto Cabello, San Juan de Los Morros, Ocumare del Tuy and Macuto, and had recently acquired the Maracaibo telephone company in 1929. The foreign company, renamed telephone Properties Ltd, still held 100% of the ordinary shares in the Nacional company, and maintained its investment; at the time of transfer it was in the process of automating its network of exchanges.

After a commission spent several years enquiring into ways of expanding the service, in 1953 the government announced its intention to acquire 100% of the shares of Cantv at a price of US$7.1M, as part of the state's program of nationalization. Over the following years it bought up the other privately owned telephone companies, the last one being Compañía de Teléfonos de San Fernando de Apure which it acquired in 1973.

=== Privatization and re-nationalization ===
The company was privatized on December 15, 1991, the envelopes containing the bids were opened in a public act and the successful bidder was the consortium VenWorld Telecom, C.A. which bid US$1.885 million (US$1.085 million above the base price) for a 40% equity stake in the company. The VenWorld consortium was headed by GTE Corporation, with 51% of the shares. The other members of the consortium were Telefónica Internacional de España, C.A. Electricidad de Caracas, each with 16%, Consorcio Inversionista Mercantil CIMA with 12% and AT&T International with 5%.

On January 8, 2007, President Hugo Chávez announced that Venezuela would re-nationalize CANTV, a move aimed at returning the company's control to the state. On April 8, 2007, the Venezuelan Government launched a tender offer to acquire Cantv’s shares in Venezuela (Class D) and in the United States (ADS). One month later on expiring the offer, the Government acquired 79.6% of the outstanding shares of the Company, in addition to the 6.6% which it previously owned, obtaining control of the Company with a total of 86.2% of its total shares.

== Subsidiaries ==
In addition to Phone service, other services provided by CANTV are divided into three subsidiaries wholly owned by CANTV, which handle internet access, cellular phone service, and directory services.

=== CANTV and CANTV.NET ===
Most of cantv wired telephone network rely over copper wire network, also known as POTS. In 2006 Cantv started offering VoIP, or Internet Phone Service to its broadband users, regardless of the fact that VoIP communication through Cantv is shoddy at best. Internet service in addition to dial-up, ISP Cantv.net, offers broadband access using ADSL technology and wireless broadband service through Movilnet's 3G network 1x EV-DO / UMTS / HSDPA in areas where the wired network does not reach the subscriber. It covers the major share of the Venezuelan broadband market, having reached 53% in 2001 and 76% in 2003, reaching more than 800.000 broadband access customers in 2007. Wireless connections, however have a 6 GB per month limit, a major blight upon claims that Venezuela's infrastructure is actually still developing. Currently there are plans to deploy Television Service over their wired broadband network (IPtv) in late 2011.

=== Movilnet ===
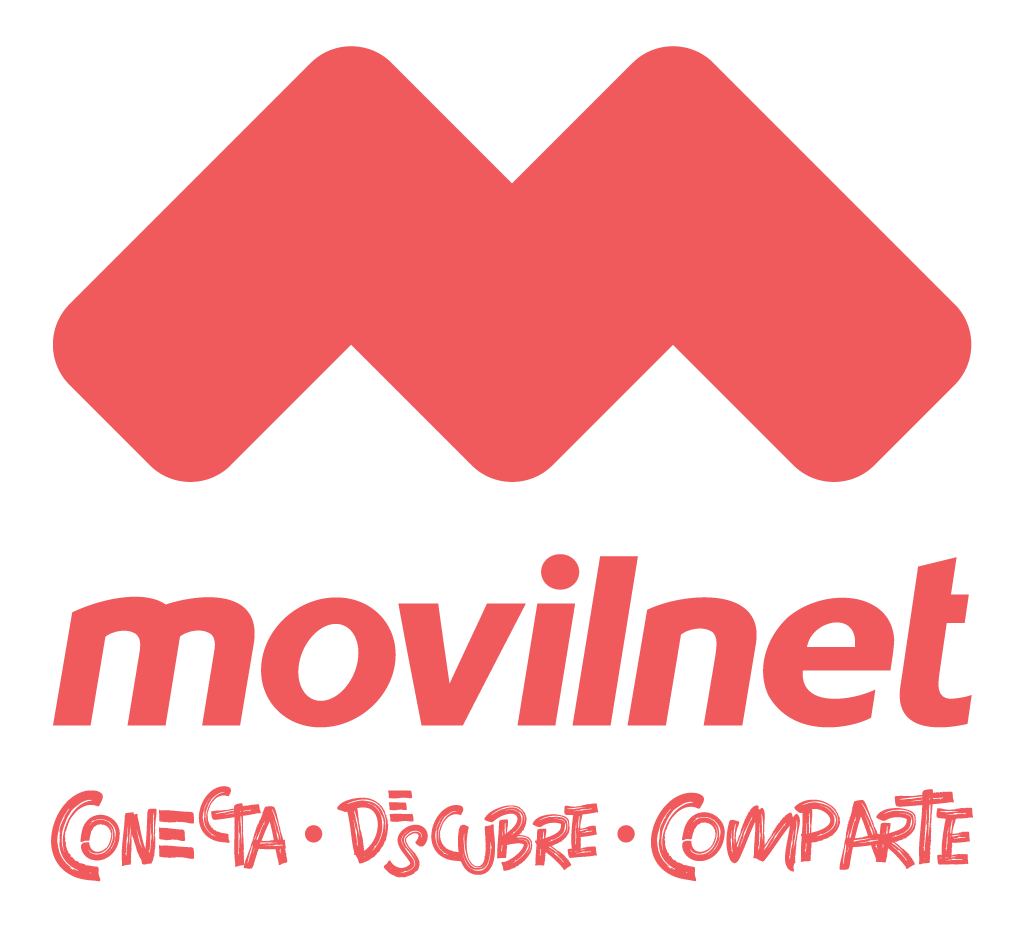
Movilnet logo

The mobile phone component of CANTV was founded in 1991. In its first year it reached about 21,000 clients while deploying an AMPS network over major cities in Venezuela. This network was then upgraded to TDMA in 1997. Movilnet offers wireless voice, data, and wireless fixed telephony, among many other services over its digital network. Today, Movilnet's wireless networks are based on 1xRTT CDMA2000, EV-DO in the 800 MHz frequency and a GSM / GPRS / EDGE / UMTS / HSDPA / LTE in the 850/1900 MHz. Both networks with nationwide coverage. In the present Movilnet has more than 1,450 1xRTT base stations, and about the same number in GSM, having more coverage than any other provider. Movilnet, reaching over 10 Million Subscribers in 2008, is also the largest Wireless service provider in Venezuela closely followed by Movistar.

=== Caveguías ===
Caveguías provides both printed and electronic directories for CANTV clients and subscribers.

== Controversy ==
=== Public surveillance ===
In an El Nuevo Herald article, former SEBIN officials and security experts claim that the Venezuelan government has allegedly spent millions of dollars to spy on Venezuelans, using Italian and Russian technology to monitor emails, keywords, and telephone conversations of its citizens, particularly Venezuelans who use CANTV for telecommunications. The information gathered is used to create a "person of interest" for Venezuelan authorities, where only selected individuals could have been fully spied on and a database set up to track those who openly opposed the Bolivarian Revolution.

== See also ==
- Censorship in Venezuela
- Media in Venezuela
