= Law on Social Responsibility on Radio and Television =

2004 Venezuelan law

Law on Social Responsibility on Radio and Television.

The Law on Social Responsibility on Radio and Television (Ley de Responsabilidad Social en Radio y Televisión, also known as the Ley Resorte) is a Venezuelan law adopted by the National Assembly and enforced since 7 December 2004. Its purpose was to establish a legal protocol for the 'social responsibility' of radio and television producers, broadcasters, viewers and listeners—both public/national and independent—in the dissemination and reception of transmitted media.

== Content ==
Its objectives, stated in Article 3, are: "[securing] respect for freedom of expression and information without censorship"; "[furthering] the actual exercise of and respect for human rights"; "[facilitating] the broadcasting of information and materials intended for minors"; "[furthering] the broadcasting of national productions and [encouraging] the development of the national audiovisual industry"; "[facilitating]the dissemination of the values of the Venezuelan culture"; and "[furthering] public participation."

Article 4 of the law allows the use of indigenous languages in programs directed specifically to indigenous peoples, and makes it a requirement to provide subtitles or sign language translation in informative programs for people with auditory disabilities.

Article 14 supports national production of TV and radio content - including music - by requiring broadcasters to transmit at least 10 hours of Venezuelan-made content every day.

The government called it a "building block for the modernization of the country's communications sector", whereas the opposition believes it increases state control over the media. According to Human Rights Watch, the law "severely threatens press freedom in Venezuela", and "[i]ts vaguely worded restrictions and heavy penalties are a recipe for self-censorship by the press and arbitrariness by government authorities."

== Features ==
On the surface, and at its core, the policy is a parental-guidance ratings system for programs, set to establish age-appropriate, advisable ratings for programming based on its content. The rating for each program is determined by four key points: language (how extreme is the programming's cursing?), health (does the programming advocate for healthy habits and living?), sex (what is the programming's level of sexual language, innuendo and/or nudity?), and violence (does the programming feature any intense and/or bloody scenes of violence/gore or weaponry?).

When a program is about to begin broadcasting, these content issues may be specifically described, in-detail, when the rating is listed; alternatively, the network may not have to describe the reasoning behind a rating, depending on the program's severity and perceived need (or lack of) for a parental-guidance warning. It is, however, mandatory to specify whether the programming in question is a national production (akin to Venezuelan 'PBS'), an independent national production (produced by a privately funded company) or an international production (i.e. a foreign-produced program).

However, the law specifically declares that Venezuelan television/radio networks must air 'cultural content' (i.e. political advertisements). Interestingly, each network is required to air the government's own advertising, campaigns, messages and other political media; this means periodically interrupting the regularly scheduled programming with political messages, regardless of whether or not the programming is political in nature. These national announcements, warranted by the President of the Republic, are widely known as cadenas (or "chains" in English) as every single operating radio/TV network MUST—for fear of penalties or punishment—simultaneously air these announcements.

== Criticism ==
The Inter-American Commission on Human Rights and the Inter-American Press Association (IAPA), as well as the Venezuelan opposition, have considered the document as a gag law that violates freedom of the press and the exercise of journalism in Venezuela.

== See also ==
- Censorship in Venezuela
- Media of Venezuela
- Television content rating system
- Watershed (broadcasting)
