= National Commission of Telecommunications =

Venezuelan telecommunications regulator

- Comisión Nacional de Telecomunicaciones

Agency overview
- Formed: June 12, 2000; 26 years ago
- Preceding agency: National Telecommunications Commission
- Headquarters: Las Mercedes, Caracas, Venezuela
- Parent agency: Ministry of Popular Power for Communication and Information
- Website: www.conatel.gob.ve

The National Commission of Telecommunications (Spanish: Comisión Nacional de Telecomunicaciones, Conatel) is an agency of the government of Venezuela that exercises the regulation, supervision and control over telecommunications in Venezuela.

== History ==
The Telecommunications Act, enacted on June 12, 2000, gave the Venezuelan state power to regulate the sector of the National Telecommunications Commission. This Commission was initially created by the # 1,826 Decree of September 5 of 1991 (Official Gazette No. 34.801 of 18 September 1991) attributing the character of autonomous service without legal personality, and the hierarchy of a Directorate General of the Ministry of Transport and Communications, which replaced the National Telecommunications Council (CNT).

== Controversies ==
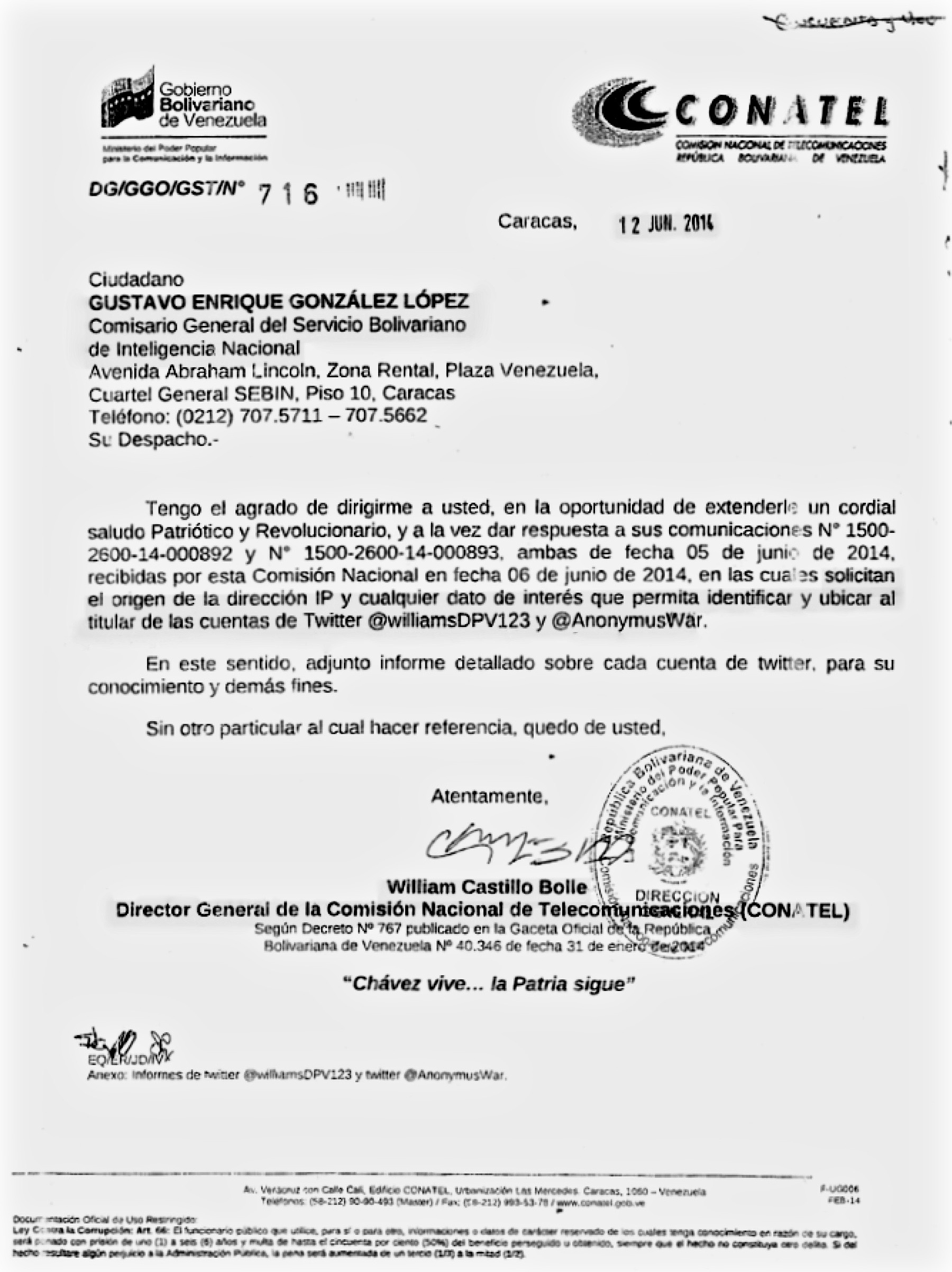
A communication from General Director of CONATEL, William Castillo Bolle, giving the IP addresses and other information of Venezuelan Twitter users to SEBIN General Commissioner Gustavo González López.

=== Censorship ===
Reporters Without Borders warned of "rising censorship in Venezuela's Internet service, including several websites and social networks facing shutdowns". They condemned actions performed by the National Telecommunications Commission (Conatel) after Conatel restricted access to websites with the unofficial market rate and "demanded social networks, particularly Twitter, to filter images related to protests taking place in Venezuela against the government". In November 2013 the Venezuelan telecommunications regulator, CONATEL, began ordering ISPs to block websites that provide the black market exchange rate. ISPs must comply within 24 hours or face sanctions, which could include the loss of their concessions. Within a month, ISPs had restricted access to more than 100 URLs. The order is based on Venezuela's 2004 media law which makes it illegal to disseminate information that could sow panic among the general public.

During the 2014 Venezuelan protests, Colombian news channel NTN24 was taken off the air by CONATEL for "promoting violence".

=== Surveillance ===
In 2014, multiple Twitter users were arrested and faced prosecution due to the tweets they made. Alfredo Romero, executive director of the Venezuelan Penal Forum (FPV), stated that the arrests of Twitter users in Venezuela was a measure to instill fear among those using social media that were critical against the government. In October 2014, eight Venezuelans were arrested shortly after the death of PSUV official Robert Serra. Though the eight Venezuelans were arrested in October 2014, the Venezuelan government had been monitoring them since June 2014 according to leaked documents, with the state telecommunications agency CONATEL providing IP addresses and other details to the Venezuelan intelligence agency SEBIN in order to arrest Twitter users.

== See also ==
- Media in Venezuela
