= El Observador (Venezuelan TV program) =

- Created by: William H. Phelps, Jr.
- Starring: Alejandro Tastets & Roxana Castillo; Ana Virginia Escobar & Andrés Mendoza; Francia Sánchez & Pedro Guerrero
- Country of origin: Venezuela

Production
- Running time: Variable
- Production company: Radio Caracas Televisión

Original release
- Network: RCTV
- Release: November 16, 1953 – 2007
- Network: RCTV International
- Release: 2007 – April 24, 2012

El Observador (English: The Observer) is the Spanish language newscast of Radio Caracas Televisión (RCTV). It was one of the first television news programs in Venezuela.

== History ==
El Observador is one of the first television news programs in Venezuela. It has aired almost continuously since November 1953 and was originally known as El Observador Creole. Its final broadcast was April 24, 2012.

=== El Observador Creole ===
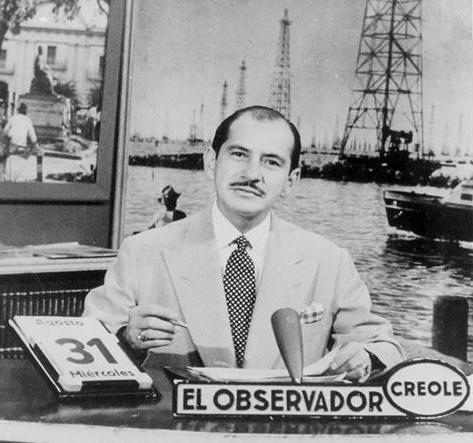
El Observador Crole's first broadcast on November 16, 1953 with anchor Francisco Amado Pernía.

Presented by the Creole Petroleum Corporation (a subsidiary of Standard Oil of New Jersey), El Observador Creole was Venezuela's first regular news program. The face and voice of Francisco Amado Pernía animated the newscasts from Monday to Saturday and Sunday the newscast corresponded to Cristóbal Rodríquez Pantoja. Seeing that the majority of the personnel that created RCTV originally came from Radio Caracas (later known as Radio Caracas Radio to differentiate it from Radio Caracas Televisión), it was clear that radio personalities such as Amable Espina, Carlos Quintana Negrón, Marco Antonio de Lacavalerie, and Pedro José Fajardo participated in the contest run by The Creole Oil Company to select their pair of hosts for their news program.

According to some sources, El Observador Creole first went on the air on 16 November 1953, one day after the inauguration of Radio Caracas Televisión, but José Luis Sarzalejo, manager of the telefilm department of the network at the time, claimed that the first newscast aired on 15 November at 8:00 pm.

Every day, 300 national and international news stories were processed as so were a significant number of photographs and material in 35mm. This consumed an average of 240 feet of film (which was about seven minutes in playtime). The first technical team of the program were Juan Zabala (first technical director), Mario Corro (operator of the video control), Alejandro Wessolowski (coordinator), Alcides Longa (cinematographic editor), Ramiro Vegas (cinematographic coordinator), and Antonio Di Mola (studio photographer).

In 1971, RCTV decided to eliminate sole sponsors. The Creole Petroleum Corporation moved to Cadena de Venezolana de Televisión (CVTV) on 3 January 1972, and remained there for the rest of the time that the company remained in Venezuela, which was a little less than two years, until nationalization of oil industry.

=== El Observador Venezolano ===
When The Creole Oil Company moved to CVTV, they took two very important things from RCTV: one was El Observador Creole and the other was its host Francisco Amado Pernía. This loss obligated the directors of the network to search for a new presenter and Eladio Lárez, current president of RCTV, was selected to be the conductor of El Observador Venezolano, a variation of the original newscast. Other presenters of El Observador Venezolano included Guillermo Vilchez, Antonio José Marcano, and Inés Sancho.

In 1975, Marcel Granier proposed to Luis García Mora, who at that time was the Director of Information of RCTV, to come up with a newscast with the same credibility of a daily newspaper such as El Nacional. The result was the introduction of the figure of the news reporter; the first of these were Marietta Santana and Darcy Alvarado.

In the early 1980s, El Observador Venezolano became known simply as El Observador.

=== El Observador ===
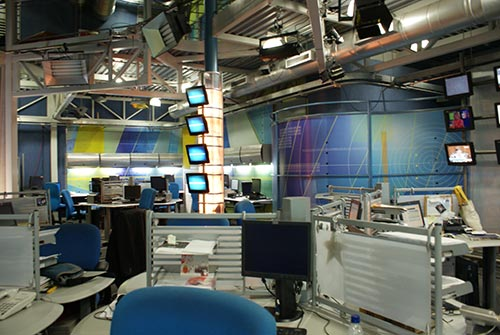
El Observador's headquarters

Over the years, El Observador had been hosted by a number of people including Franklin Villasmil, Tinedo Guia (now retired), Unai Amenábar (now at Venevisión), Alba Cecilia Mujica (now at Globovisión), Shia Bertoni, Eva Gutierrez, Laura Furcic, Jaime Suarez, Maricarmen Sobrino, Anna Vaccarella, María Teresa Weissacher, and Kristina Wetter to name a few.

In 1996, the El Observador website was launched.

In 1998, a computerized system was introduced to make the editing process more efficient and effective, which helped facilitate labor production, save on resources and time, and permit better control and organization.

On 18 July 2005, the Centro Nacional de Noticias (National Center for News), El Observador's new headquarters, was inaugurated. From here, RCTV broadcasts El Observador (all three daily emissions), La Entrevista, and other special programs of information and opinion. The President of Empresas 1BC and General Director of RCTV, Marcel Granier, and the President of RCTV, Eladio Larez, were present at its inauguration. It is located in Quinta Crespo, a neighborhood in central Caracas, Venezuela where Radio Caracas Televisión's other studios can be found. The National Center for News has three new and modern studios equipped with the latest technology, a press room with 35 workstations, 10 editing booths, 10 visualization stations, a department of digitalization, a graphics room, and a room dedicated to the reception of satellite and microwave signals. The new center contains six robotic cameras (which do not require the use of a cameraman) and one wireless camera. Also, the center contains a special system of lights that does not produce heat in the studio. New programs were purchased to manage texts and video. One of the most technological advances introduced with the opening of the center is the discontinued use of the VTR, or videotape system, as the center contains a server with the capacity to hold 300 hours of video.

On 28 December 2006, President Hugo Chávez announced that the government would not renew RCTV's broadcast license when it expired in May 2007, which threatened the existence of RCTV and El Observador.

After the shutdown of RCTV on terrestrial television, El Observador became a webcast, with newscasts being uploaded onto YouTube, venezuelapress.com, and El Observador's own website. It was also aired on Globovisión. During this period, the El Observador channel on YouTube had the most subscribers of all YouTube users.

El Observador returned to the air when RCTV relaunched as a cable and satellite channel on 16 July 2007 and currently airs three times a day (9:30 am, 12:00 pm, and 11:00 pm).

On 15 June 2008, Javier García, a reporter and part-time anchor for El Observador, was found stabbed to death in his bed at his apartment in the Bello Monte neighborhood of Caracas. A suspect was later arrested. García's murder was the first, and so far only, murder of a current El Observador journalist.

El Observador logo from the 1980s

== News Team ==
Anchors

- Alejandro Tastets - morning edition anchor
- Roxana Castillo - morning edition anchor
- Ana Virginia Escobar - noon edition anchor
- Andrés Mendoza - noon edition anchor
- Francia Sánchez - night edition anchor
- Pedro Guerrero - night edition anchor

Reporters

- Laura Castellanos
- Yanitza León
- José Pernalete
- María Elisa González
- Iris García
- Jessica Flores
- Violeta Rosas
- Junior Acosta
- Jennifer De Santana
- Freddy Oldenburg
- Romy Gómez
- Anahís Cruz - based in Zulia
- Edward Rodríguez - based in Zulia
- Yamile Jiménez - based in Táchira
- Atamaica Briceño - based in Lara
- Enler García - based in Anzoátegui
- Eillen Salomón - based in Carabobo
- Kristian Rodríguez - based in Aragua
- Francine Howard - based in Bolívar
- Adriana Díaz - based in Sucre
- Lisbeth Miquilena - based in Nva. Esparta

== Management ==
Eduardo Sapene is the Vice-president of Information and Special Programs at Radio Caracas Televisión. His department is in charge of managing El Observador.

== See also ==
- List of programs broadcast by RCTV
- Radio Caracas Televisión (RCTV)
