= Marcel Granier =

Venezuelan businessperson (born 1941)

Marcel Granier Haydon (born July 4, 1941) is a Venezuelan businessperson. He is the president and CEO of Empresas 1BC and the general director of Radio Caracas Televisión (RCTV), which until becoming a cable TV-channel on May 27, 2007, was the most watched television channel in Venezuela.

== Biography ==
Marcel Granier was born on July 4, 1941, to Marcel Granier Doyeux and Brígida Haydon Urbaneja. He attended law school and later married Dorothy Phelps Tovar, the granddaughter of the founder of Empresas 1BC and Radio Caracas Radio, William Henry Phelps. In 1969, Granier quit practising law and became a director at RCTV, moving up the ranks to his current position. On November 10, 1976, he began hosting Primer Plano, a talk show that has aired off and on throughout the years, with the most recent show airing on November 30, 2006.

Marcel Granier and his television network were accused of supporting the 2002 coup attempt against President Hugo Chávez and the 2002-2003 general strike, and the Venezuelan government decided to shutdown the channel in return. Upon the shutdown, Chavez claimed RCTV would be punished for criticizing the government. Granier and the other directors at the network fight for its return to the public airwaves. Granier claims that this license did not need renewing and that this was an "illegal shutdown" by the government. Human rights groups have decried the shutdown, with Thor Halvorssen of the Human Rights Foundation calling the shut down "the final move in his (Chavez') drive to shut down all independent voices."

== Personal life ==
They have six children together; Marcel Alfredo Granier Phelps, Carlos Eduardo Granier Phelps, María Cristina Granier Phelps, María Clara Granier Phelps, Isabel Helena Granier Phelps, and Jorge Ignacio Granier Phelps.

== Publications ==
- La generación de relevo vs. el estado omnipotente (1984)
- Más y mejor democracia (1987)

== See also ==
- Eladio Lárez
- Empresas 1BC
- Radio Caracas Radio (RCR)
- Radio Caracas Televisión (RCTV)
- Recordland
- William Henry Phelps
- William H. Phelps, Jr.
