= Bermúdez Municipality =

Bermúdez Municipality Municipio Bermúdez
- Municipality
- Flag Coat of arms

- Location in Sucre

- Location in Venezuela
- Coordinates: 10°40′20″N 63°14′25″W
- Country: Venezuela
- State: Sucre
- Municipal seat: Carúpano

Government
  - Mayor: Julio Rodriguez (PSUV)

Population (2011)
  - Total: 165,675
- Time zone: UTC−4 (VET)
- Area code(s): 0294

The Bermúdez Municipality is one of the fifteen municipalities (municipios) that makes up the eastern Venezuelan state of Sucre and, according to a 2011 population estimate by the National Institute of Statistics of Venezuela, the municipality has a population of 165,675. The city of Carúpano is the administrative centre for the Bermúdez Municipality. The municipality was named for Venezuelan independence hero José Francisco Bermúdez.

== History ==
It was somewhere on the Paria Peninsula, near Carúpano, where Christopher Columbus first set foot on the American continent for the only time, during his third voyage (in all his other trips he only explored the Caribbean islands).

== Demographics ==
The Bermúdez Municipality, according to a 2011 population estimate by the National Institute of Statistics of Venezuela, has a population of 165,675 (up from 128,123 in 2000). This amounts to 16.4% of the state's population. The municipality's population density is 820 inhabitants per square kilometre (2,100/sq mi).

== Government ==
The municipality is divided into five parishes; Bolívar, Macarapana, Santa Catalina, Santa Rosa, and Santa Teresa. The elected office of mayor (alcalde) was established in 1990; however, the initial election was disputed. Carlos Monasterio was installed in 1990 and had served eighteen months when the court (Supreme Electoral Council) removed him, and established Juan Marquez Albornoz as the actual winner of the election.

Mayors of the Bermúdez Municipality
Name	from	to
Carlos Monasterio	1990	1992
Juan Marquez Albornoz	1992	1993
Leonardo Ávila	1993	1996
Arturo Hurtado	1996	2000
Claudio Marín Morales	2000	2004
José Ramón Regnault Hernández	2004	2008
Julio Rodriguez	2008	present

== Notable natives ==
Famous Carupaneros include:

- Wolfgang Larrazábal, former President of Venezuela.
- Jictzad Viña, Miss Venezuela 2005.
- Eladio Lárez, president of Radio Caracas Televisión, one of Venezuela's largest television networks.
- Jesús Flores, Washington Nationals major league baseball catcher.

== See also ==
- Corsican immigration to Venezuela
