= Primer Plano (talk show) =

Primer Plano's final logo

Primer Plano's logo in 1988

Primer Plano is a Venezuelan television talk show, aired on Radio Caracas Televisión (RCTV) and hosted by Marcel Granier, the current general director of RCTV and president of Empresas 1BC, the parent company of RCTV. The show debuted on 10 November 1976 with an interview of Diego Arria Salicetti, then governor of Caracas and has aired on-and-off since then. Primer Plano's most famous guest was Venezuelan president Hugo Chávez in 1998. Other important guest included Arturo Uslar Pietri, Henrique Salas Römer, Henrique Salas Feo, Irene Sáez, Valentina Quintero, and Andrés Velázquez to name a few. The latest episode of Primer Plano took place on 30 November 2006 with an interview of Manuel Rosales, the current governor of Zulia and the then-opposition presidential candidate for the 2006 Venezuelan presidential elections.
