= Radio Caracas =

Radio Caracas may refer to:

- Radio Caracas Radio, a Venezuelan radio network
- Radio Caracas Televisión Internacional, a Venezuelan cable television network
