= Jorge Granier =

Jorge Granier Phelps is a Venezuelan producer, director and entrepreneur. He is best known for his role as Executive Producer and bringing the highly successful and critically acclaimed CW show "Jane the Virgin" to the U.S., which won a Golden Globe, an AFI TV Program of the Year award, a People’s Choice Award for Favorite New TV Comedy, a Peabody Award, and Imagen Foundation Awards for Best Primetime Television Program (Comedy), Best Actress (Television) and Best Supporting Actress (Television). Among other productions are titles such as the Netflix Original "Nicky Jam: El Ganador", the feature documentary "Pablo Escobar, Angel o Demonio?", the YouTube digital series "Isla Presidencial" and the telenovela "Mi Gorda Bella".

Granier is co-founder of Rubicon Global Media, a company that aggregates intellectual property from Latin America and Spain, transforming it into content with multinational appeal. Working alongside co-founder Chris Albrecht, the company has formed strategic partnerships with Secuoya Studios, the leading Spanish-language content production studio and Mexico-based BTF Media. Rubicon has several series in development including a show with Curtis “50 Cent” Jackson and Latin Grammy-winning artist Eladio Carrion. Previously he was Managing Director of Aquarius Pictures,

In 2009 he founded Pongalo and in 2014 became CEO overseeing the diversified Latino-focused digital media company and creating a robust digital ecosystem of media properties, including the Pongalo OTT platform, Pongalo Networks’ YouTube channels, and one of the largest collections of Latino-focused digital rights in the world. In 2018 Pongalo was acquired by ViX.

In 2020, Jorge Granier co-founded El American, a bilingual digital news company for US Hispanics. The company was acquired by Voz Media in 2023. Previously he co-founded with Romulo Guardia and Eligio Cedeño the dubbing company IDS Dubbing Services, acquired in 2018 by Cedeño's V-me and Vme Kids.

In addition, Granier served as director of Empresas 1BC, which operates diverse media enterprises such as Radio Caracas Televisión, Etheron, Radio Caracas Radio, 92.9 tu FM, Sonográfica, FonoVideo, Recordland, and Radionet, to name a few.

== Biography ==
Granier belongs to the fifth generation in charge of leading Empresas 1BC, following the legacy of his maternal great grandfather, William H. Phelps, Sr., who in 1953 started the first private television station in Venezuela RCTV and Radio Caracas Radio.

== Affiliations ==
- Academy of Television Arts & Sciences, member and juror
- International Academy of Television Arts & Sciences, member and juror
- Producers Guild of America, member
- Motion Picture Institute, fellow
- Recurrent speaker at key industry events such as Content Americas, NATPE, MIPCOM, Hispanic TV Summit, LA digital, Digital Hollywood and Foro Mundial de la Telenovela.
