= Edgar J. Anzola =

Venezuelan film producer, radio pioneer, journalist and cartoonist

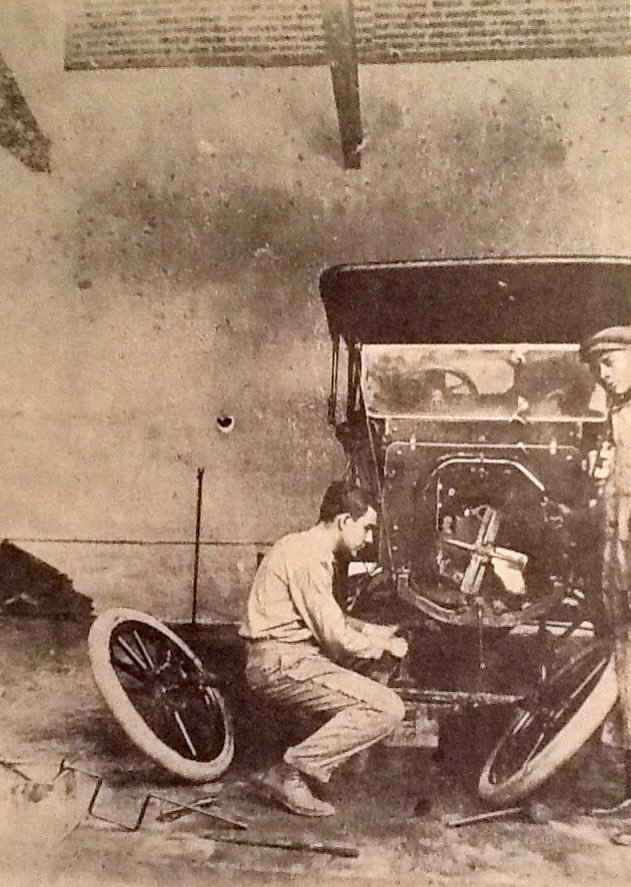
- Anzola repairing a Model T in 1914
- Born: Edgar Jaín Anzola Anzola; 27 March 1893; Villa de Cura, Aragua, Venezuela
- Died: 14 December 1981 (aged 88)
- Years active: 1918–1970
- Known for: Pioneer in many industries
- Honours: Order of Francisco de Miranda (Commander)

Edgar Jaín Anzola (27 March 1893, Villa de Cura – 14 December 1981, Caracas) (Note: The Carlos Manuel Delgado Díaz article gives Anzola's birth year as 1894, and his age at leaving for the United States as 17 (page 4). Most other sources give 1893 and 16. Anzola is understood to have returned to Venezuela in 1911; if he were born in 1894 and been 17 as in Delgado Díaz, he would have left Venezuela in 1911. The alternative birth year may affect the assertion of age for his Order award, if it has been calculated by Delgado Díaz from years.) was a Venezuelan pioneering engineer, filmmaker, radio broadcaster, writer, journalist and cartoonist. He is credited with several firsts: bringing the first automobile to Venezuela; engineering Venezuela's first aeroplane flight; starring in Venezuela's first feature film; starting Venezuela's first commercial radio station; and producing Venezuela's first scientific documentary. His son, filmmaker Alfredo Anzola, created the 1993 film El misterio de los ojos escarlata about his father's life.

For services to Venezuela, he was made a Commander of the Order of Francisco de Miranda at the age of 70.

== Early life ==
Anzola was the son of lawyer and writer Juvenal Anzola, and was registered in Chacao Municipality for much of his life. He had one brother, César Virgilio, who did not become a writer like his family and was instead a successful dentist. After working in the United States, Edgar Anzola returned to Venezuela in 1911.

== Engineering ==
Anzola was sent to Detroit, in the United States, by William Henry Phelps at the age of sixteen to train as a car mechanic, specializing in Ford Model T automobiles. From his work, he introduced Ford cars to Venezuela: he brought the first automobiles to the country, and then toured various cities in his own Ford to market them.

In 1912, he helped with the first airplane flight in Venezuela, of the plane "Sin Cola" flown by Frank Boland, an opportunity he says was only given him because of his engineering background and English skills. During the first flight, on 6 October 1912, he followed the path of the plane on motorcycle. The route was from El Paraíso to Antímano. He worked as an engineer and translator for all three plane builds for Boland in Venezuela, one of which was a hydroplane; for this, he is considered Venezuela's first aeronautical engineer.

== Cinema ==
In 1913 he participated in the production of the silent film La dama de las cayenas by Lucas Manzano and Enrique Zimmerman. In 1924 he founded the production company Triunfo Films with Jacobo Capriles, the pair producing the feature films La trepadora and Amor, tú eres la vida. Triunfo Films was dissolved in 1928, but Anzola would go on to found two other production companies: Anzola Film (1929–1935) and Estudios Ávila (1938–1942). In 1932 he worked on the feature film Corazón de mujer, with director José Fernández and cinematographer Juanito Martínez Pozueta.

After working in the US again in the late 1930s, he returned to Venezuela to work in the Laboratorios Nacionales with other film pioneers in the development of sound and color film.

The Centro Nacional Autónomo de Cinematografía have published a book about Anzola.

== Radio ==
When studying and working in the United States, Anzola acquired a knowledge of electronics, which allowed him to start the radio station One Broadcasting Caracas (later Radio Caracas), first broadcasting in 1930. He brought one of the first phonographs to Venezuela. In addition, he was active on the radio as an actor, as well as writing many scripted shows. In 1937 he traveled back to the US, where he was Deputy Managing Director of RCA Victor and appeared as an anchor on Spanish-language radio.

A documentary about his life was compiled by his son, Alfredo Anzola, in 1993, called El misterio de los ojos escarlata. The documentary is titled after a lost "radionovela" of the same name written by Alfredo Cortina and produced by Edgar Anzola.

Anzola has also helped write music, included on a record released in 1966.

== Other work ==
A lot of Anzola's work was writing stories and plays. He was also a contributor to the magazines and newspapers Élite, Billiken, Ahora, El Nacional and La Esfera, and occasionally publishing cartoons in the weekly magazine Fantoches. In 1924 he had a stint as a field camera man for Fox News. He had also been on the Board of Directors of a golf association in Vargas in 1951.

Anzola was a member of Rotary International, serving on the Vocational Services committee in 1961-62^{:55} and 1964–65,^{:59} the Service to Youth committee in 1963–64,^{:54} and the Interact committee in 1965–66.^{:62} He was once the District Governor of Rotary International in Caracas.^{:21}

He was on the Foreign Advisory Committee of the World Calendar Association.

== Personal life ==
Anzola's son, Alfredo Anzola, was born to Margot Golding.

In a Rotary International writing competition, about the "book that changed me most", Anzola wrote on William H. Prescott's History of the Conquest of Mexico and Conquest of Peru, earning an honorable mention.

Anzola travelled around the Americas and Europe, and spoke Spanish, French, and English fluently, having some competency in Portuguese and Italian.

== List of works ==
Year	Work	Role	Notes
1913	La Dama de la Cayenas	actor	first Venezuelan feature film production
1921	El tripanosoma venezolano	producer	first Venezuelan scientific documentary; with Capriles and Juan Iturbe
1924	El hombre de la llanura	performer, writer	radio
1924	El italiano y los zancudos	performer, writer	radio
1924	La Trepadora	director, producer, actor	feature film; with Capriles; based on novel by Rómulo Gallegos; 73 minutes
1925	Carnaval en Caracas	director, producer	short film; with Capriles
1925	La visita del General Pershing	director, producer	film; with Capriles; 25 minutes
1925	El Dique De Petaquire	director	film; with Capriles; 30 minutes
1926	Amor, Tu Eres La Vida	director, producer, editor	feature film; with Capriles; 35 mm black-and-white; 75 minutes
1927	En los llanos de Venezuela	director	film; with Capriles; American production (Rockefeller Foundation); 35 minutes
1928	El Turco apasionado	performer, writer	radio
1928	Fritz enamorado	performer, writer	radio
1928	El hombre de la llanura	performer, writer	radio; remake of own work
1928	El borracho	writer	radio; performed by Rafael Guinand
1928	El novio de Petronila	writer	radio; performed by Guinand
1928	El Ciclo Vital Del Schistosoma Manzoni	director, producer	film; 40 minutes
1928	Reverón	director	film; about Armando Reverón; 30 minutes
1930	Palo e discurso	writer	radio; performed by Guinand
1930	Discurso de Dr. Nigüin	writer	radio
1930	El pulpero bregador	performer, writer	radio
1930	Los arrieros	performer, writer	radio; performed with Guinand
1930	En familia	performer, writer	radio; performed with Guinand
1930	Fritz en la estación	performer, writer	radio; performed with Guinand
1930	Viaje A Riviera	director	film; 30 minutes
1932	Corazón de mujer	producer, writer	feature film; based on story by Anzola; 35 mm black-and-white; 95 minutes
1934	Cerebro mágico	performer	radio
1934	Cerebro mágico	performer	radio
1936	La Voz Mágica	performer	radio
1936	La Voz Mágica	performer	radio
1966	Canta, Canta, Llanerito	writer, performer	music
