= Tu Tienda RCTV =

Tu Tienda RCTV is a gift shop located inside the Recordland at the Sambil Mall in Caracas, Venezuela. It was inaugurated on December 15, 2006, and offers items such as hats, pens, coffee mugs, and key chains, to name a few. All items contain the logo of Radio Caracas Television (RCTV), ¿Quien Quiere Ser Millonario?, or RCTV's new telenovela, Te Tengo en Salsa.

== History ==
Tu Tienda RCTV opened on December 15, 2006. This project was made possible due to the joint effort of Beatriz Perez Ayala, Vice-president of Strategic Communications for RCTV, Jose Celma, Brand Manager of RCTV, and Roberto Petrocelli, General Director of Recordland, with collaboration from Joaquin Moreno. RCTV and Recordland are owned by Empresas 1BC.

== See also ==
- Empresas 1BC
- RCTV
- Recordland
