= Primer Plano =

Primer Plano may refer to:

- Primer Plano (magazine) in Spain
- Primer Plano (television show) in Venezuela
