= 1BC =

1BC is a three-letter acronym that may refer to:

- Empresas 1BC, a Venezuelan corporation
- 1 BC, the last BC year
- OneBC, a right-to-far-right political party in British Columbia
