= Recordland =

Venezuelan retail chain

- Company type: Privately held company
- Industry: Retail
- Founded: 1982
- Defunct: 2019
- Headquarters: Caracas, Venezuela
- Key people: Marcel Granier, President Empresas 1BC; Roberto Petrocelli, General Director Recordland
- Products: Compact Discs, DVDs
- Parent: Empresas 1BC
- Website: Recordland

Recordland was one of Venezuela's largest music and video store chains. It was owned by Empresas 1BC, which is the same owner of Radio Caracas Radio and Radio Caracas Television (RCTV). Recordland opened in 1982 and only operated 1 store in Sabana Grande, Caracas. In 2019, as a result of the economic crisis in the country and the rise of digital platforms, the only store in Caracas closed on December 15. On December 15, 2006, Tu Tienda RCTV, a gift shop that sold various products containing the logo of RCTV, ¿Quien Quiere Ser Millonario?, and RCTV's new telenovela, Te Tengo en Salsa, opened in the Recordland at the Centro Sambil in Caracas.

On December 1, 2019, Recordland began closing down its stores one by one, with the main one in Sabana Grande closing on December 15. The chain lost its distributor, disc manufacturer Optilaser, and several record labels had left Venezuela at the time of the decision.

== See also ==
- Empresas 1BC
- Radio Caracas Radio
- RCTV
- Venezuelan Album Chart
