= Kathleen Deery de Phelps =

Australian/Venezuelan conservationist (1908–2001)

- Born: Kathleen Phoebe Deery; 22 November 1908; Sydney
- Died: 21 August 2001 (aged 92); Caracas
- Citizenship: Australia, Venezuela
- Occupations: Collector, Explorer, Conservationist, Ornithologist
- Spouses: Robert Bottome, William H. Phelps Jr.
- Children: Robert Bottome Deery, Peter Bottome Deery,
- Parent(s): Arthur Deery, Agnes Thorne

Kathleen Deery de Phelps, better known as Kathy Phelps, (Sydney, 22 November 1908 – Caracas, Venezuela, 21 August 2001) was an Australian born Venezuelan explorer, collector and conservationist.

== Biography ==
She was born in Sydney to Arthur Deery and Agnes Thorne. She did higher studies in the United States. In 1940 she came to Venezuela and became a Venezuelan citizen in 1941 with her marriage to ornithologist and businessman William H. Phelps Jr. She participated with her husband in several expeditions to investigate the fauna and flora of Venezuela. Together with Carmen de Phister, she founded the Association of Girl Scouts of Venezuela (AGSV) on 26 June 1958. She was president of the Venezuelan Red Cross. She wrote several books based on her experiences. She also presided over the Phelps Collection, which is considered the largest collection of birds in Latin America, with more than 80,000 birds in feathers, 1,000 preserved in alcohol and 1,500 skeletons.

She received an honorary doctorate from Yacambú University in Barquisimeto.

She married Robert Bottome, and had two children by him, Robert Bottome Deery and Peter Bottome Deery. She married William H. Phelps Jr. on 4 February 1941.

== Honors ==
=== Memberships ===
- Member and president of Girl Scouts Guides of Venezuela.
- Member for nine years of Our Cabaña, World Center for Girl Guides and Girl Scouts of Cuernavaca, Mexico.
- Founding member of the Little Theater in San Román.
- Founder of the International Scholarships (American Field Scholarships) in Venezuela.
- Member of Society of Woman Geographers
- Member of the New York Botanical Garden Association.
- First female member of the Explorers Club of New York.
- Honorary member of the Venezuelan Society of Natural Sciences, Caracas.
- Member of the Committee for the Preservation of the Los Roques Archipelago.
- Member of the Parque del Este Committee (Comité Parque del Este), in Caracas, for 12 years.
- Life member of the Parks Committee.
- President of the William H. Phelps Collection/Foundation.
- President of the Foundation of the Society of Natural Sciences.
- Member of the Foundation for the Development of Physical, Mathematical and Natural Sciences (FUDECO).
- Member of FUDENA.
- Member of the es:Ministerio del Ambiente y de los Recursos Naturales Renovables (MARNR).
- Member of the board of the National Institute of Parks (IMPARQUES).
- Member of the Royal Society of London.
- Honorary vice president of the International Council for the Preservation of Birds (now BirdLife International)-Cambridge, England.
- Honorary member of the Ornithological Society of France - Ligue pour la Protection des Oiseaux (LPO).Ligue pour la protection des oiseaux
- Member of the committee for the conservation of Lake of Valencia.

== Publications ==
- Memories of Misia Kathy. First expedition Phelps to Cerro Jimé (1986)
- Memories of Misia Kathy (1987).
- Memories of Misia Kathy. History of an unknown yavi (1988).
- Venezuelan birds. One hundred of the best known (Four editions: 1954, 1955, 1963, 1999).
