= Peter Bottome =

Venezuelan businessman (1937–2016)

- Born: 28 December 1937
- Died: 14 February 2016 (aged 78); Caracas, Venezuela
- Occupation: Businessman
- Spouse: Ana Cristina Reverón Branger
- Parent(s): Robert Bottome; Kathleen Deery

Peter Bottome Deery (28 December 1937 – 14 February 2016) was a Venezuelan businessman. He was shareholder and the General Director of Venezuelan corporation Empresas 1BC.

== Biography ==
His parents were Robert Bottome and Kathleen Deery. Later, Katherine Deery married William H. Phelps Jr., founder of Venezuelan TV station RCTV. Peter Bottome Deery was the brother of Robert Bottome Deery, owner of VenEconomy, a consultancy company providing financial, political and economic data in Venezuela.

In 1959, Peter Bottome became director of the radio station Radio Caracas Radio. He gave the radio station a new style focused on broadcasting American music. Years later, he founded Caracas 92.9, an FM station in Caracas.

Bottome was president of the board of directors of Corporación Radiofónica Venezolana (CORAVEN), a branch of Empresas 1BC in charge of international distribution of RCTV productions. He was the main shareholder of Venezuelan newspaper El Diario de Caracas until 1995 when it was shut down.

Additionally, Peter Bottome was senior partner of Venezuelan airline Aerotuy. He developed Aeropotoco, a flight training school located in Oscar Machado Zuloaga International Airport, and Airtech, a company of aircraft maintenance.

In 1990, Bottome created in Puerto La Cruz, a company named Centro Marino de Oriente to repair sport boats.

He died on 14 February 2016, as a consequence of a myeloma detected a year before.
