= La Entrevista =

- Created by: Buenaventura Briceño
- Starring: Miguel Ángel Rodríguez
- Country of origin: Venezuela

Production
- Running time: 3 hours

Original release
- Network: RCTV (2001-present)
- Release: present

La Entrevista (English: The Interview) is a Spanish-language television news program aired by Radio Caracas Televisión (RCTV) in Venezuela. It is presented daily by journalist Miguel Ángel Rodríguez, and the invited interviewee, which are often either political personalities or other journalists. It broadcasts live from the Centro Nacional de Noticias (National Center for News), the same center where El Observador, RCTV's newscast, set is located. In the past, the program had been hosted by Anna Vaccarella and Luisana Ríos.

La Entrevista focuses on issues that have to do with national and international events. The program was designed and destined to inquire about the most relevant news, supported by face-to-face interviews (hence its name), and have testimonials of people involved in certain events. Its objective is to search for answers from those who have the responsibility to correct situations that reflects the Venezuela of today.
