= Línea Turística Aereotuy =

Venezuelan airline

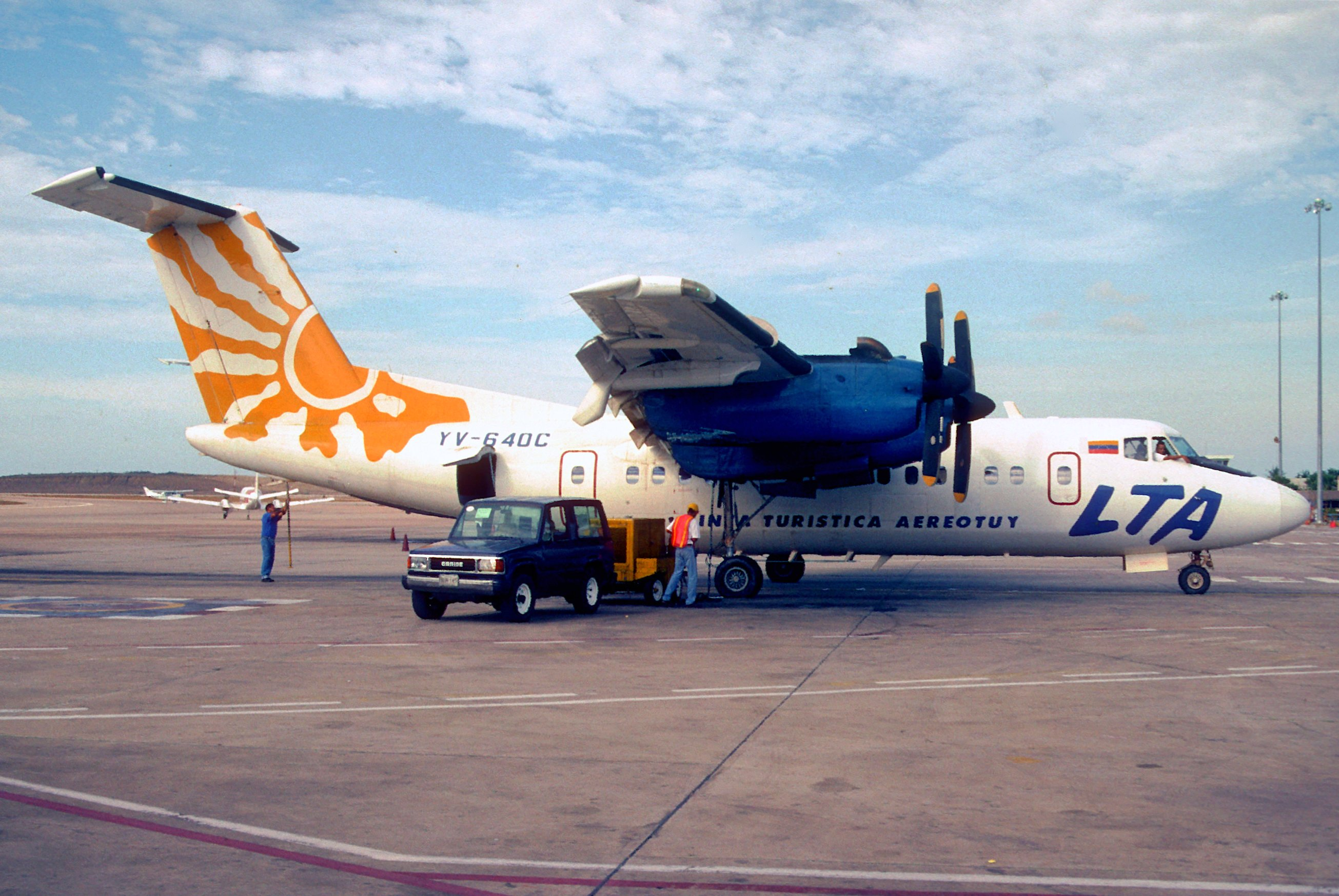
IATA	ICAO	Call sign
LD	TUY	AEREOTUY
- Founded: 1982
- Commenced operations: June 30, 1982
- Ceased operations: June 2018
- Hubs: Simón Bolívar International Airport
- Fleet size: 1
- Destinations: 7
- Parent company: Grupo Cóndor C.A.
- Headquarters: Caracas, Venezuela
- Founder: Peter Bottome
- Employees: ~150 (as of January 2018)
- Website: www.tuy.com

LTA - Linea Turistica Aereotuy, C.A. was a Venezuelan regional airline headquartered in Caracas and based at Simón Bolívar International Airport.

== History ==
The airline was established in 1982 by Peter Bottome and started operations on June 30 of the same year. It was part of a full-service safari company with its own lodges, camps, guides, aircraft, and sailing vessels, and operated services to remote destinations in Venezuela, including tourist attractions.

In November 11, 2014, the airline was forced to suspend its flights to Aruba, affecting more than 7,000 customers. The airline suspended flights after an aircraft on the route failed; however, the National Institute of Civil Aviation said the suspension was due to over-selling tickets on the route and the creation of new unauthorized flights to cover the over-sale. This suspension was maintained until February 28, 2015.

By December 2015, it was announced that LTA was bought by Grupo Cóndor C.A., which also owned Aserca and SBA Airlines. Under this new ownership, LTA resumed flights to Los Roques and Porlamar in September 2016.

On August 14, 2017, LTA suspended operations again due to low demand, high prices, and aircraft maintenance. However, in June 2018, the airline ceased all services.

== Destinations ==
The airline flew to the following destinations, with further routes served as charters (as of November 2014):

Country	City	Airport	Notes
Aruba	Oranjestad	Queen Beatrix International Airport	
Venezuela	Canaima	Canaima Airport	
Venezuela	Caracas	Simón Bolívar International Airport	Hub
Venezuela	Ciudad Guayana	Manuel Carlos Piar Guayana Airport	
Venezuela	Higuerote	Higuerote Airport	
Venezuela	Los Roques	Los Roques Airport	
Venezuela	Porlamar	Santiago Mariño Caribbean International Airport	

== Fleet ==
An Aereotuy Dornier 228 parked at Canaima Airport in 1994

Aereotuy consisted of the following aircraft:

- 1 ATR 42-320
- 1 Beechcraft 1900C
- 1 Cessna 206
- 11 Cessna 208B Grand Caravan
- 1 Cessna 425
- 1 Cessna Citation V
- 6 De Havilland Canada DHC-6 Twin Otter
- 5 de Havilland Canada Dash 7
- 8 Dornier 228
- 2 Reims-Cessna F406 Caravan II

== Accidents and incidents ==
- On July 21, 2007, a Cessna 208B Grand Caravan crashed after an engine failure while taking off. There was no personal injury, but the plane was written off.
- On April 17, 2009, a Cessna 208B Grand Caravan (registered YV1181) crashed shortly after taking off from Canaima National Park after failing to gain sufficient altitude, killing one person. The aircraft had been chartered to take holiday makers to Ciudad Bolívar.
- On August 26, 2009, a Cessna 208B Grand Caravan had to make an emergency landing on the way from Los Roques Airport to Santiago Mariño Caribbean International Airport after an engine failure. The passengers and crew were rescued by fishing and pleasure boats.

== See also ==
- List of airlines of Venezuela
