= Anna Vaccarella =

Venezuelan journalist

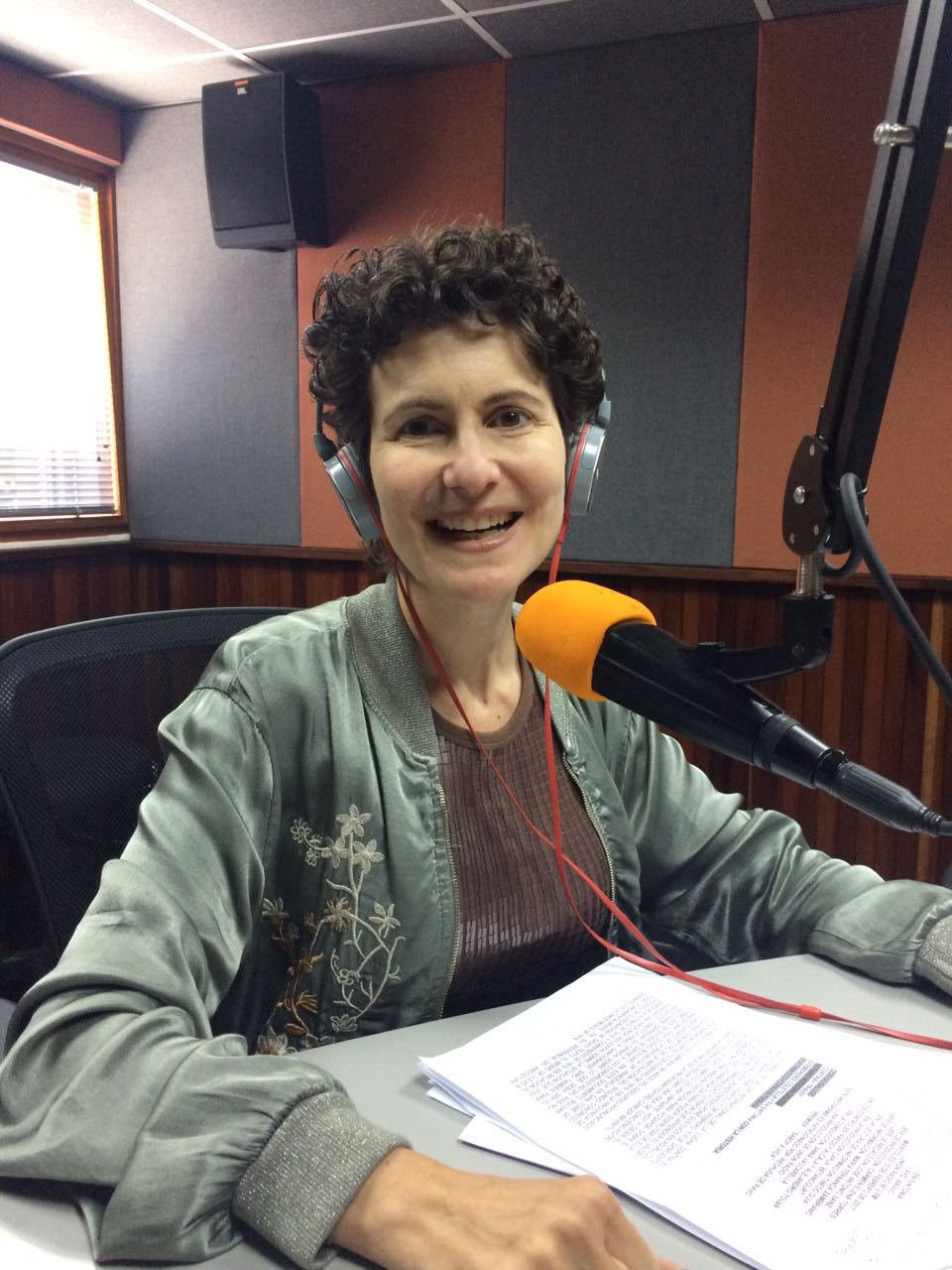
- Born: Anna Sebastiana Vaccarella Ilija; August 31, 1968; Maracay, Aragua
- Occupation: Journalist
- Known for: Alerta (RCTV), En Sintonía (Unión Radio)
- Spouse: Román Lozinski (m. 2005; div. 2019)
- Children: 2
- Parent(s): Carmelo Vaccarella; Anna Ilija

Anna Vaccarella (born August 31, 1968 in Maracay, Aragua) is a Venezuelan journalist. She currently works in radio show on Unión Radio.

== Biography and career ==
She was born in Maracay on August 31, 1968, and raised in Cagua. She is the daughter of Italian father Carmelo Vaccarella (originally from Messina, Sicily), who immigrated to Cagua, where he met his future wife, Slovenian mother Anna Ilija (originally from Yugoslavia), while she was visiting one of her sisters who lived there. Ilija immigrated to Güigüe when she was five years old. She has one brother, Antonio (born 1966).

At 17 years of age, Vaccarella moved to Caracas to study journalism at the Andrés Bello Catholic University, where she graduated first of its class.

She began her career in RCTV, where worked as a journalist for 10 years. Vaccarella started as a correspondent, then with only 24 years old, she led Alerta, a newsmagazine television program. She also ventured into radio and worked for 8 years in Kys FM 101.5.

After she left RCTV Vaccarella joins Venevisión, where she had the opportunity to work as news anchor together with journalists Unai Amenabar and Eduardo Rodríguez. She worked in Venevisión for 12 years, until December 2013. Then, she decides to return to the radio to be the host of the program En Sintonía transmitted by Unión Radio 90.3 FM.

== Personal life ==
In 2005, Vaccarella marries her colleague Román Lonzinski. The couple had difficulties to conceive but as a result of in vitro treatments, her twins Isabella and Sofia were born on May 7, 2011.

On July 31, 2015, Vaccarella sent a statement in which she revealed that after having a hysterectomy, the results of the biopsy showed that she had non-Hodgkin lymphoma, a type of cancer that attacks lymph cells and bone marrow.

On February 2, 2016, she underwent a bone marrow transplant in New York City. Approximately five months later, Vaccarella returned to Venezuela and resumed her work at Unión Radio.
