= María Teresa Arnal =

Venezuelan industrial engineer

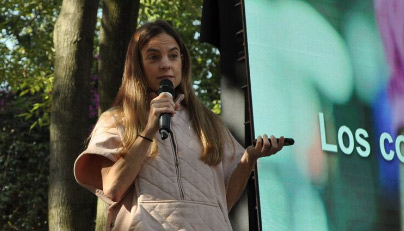
- Arnal (2018)
- Education: Andrés Bello Catholic University
- Occupation: Industrial engineer

María Teresa Arnal is a Venezuelan industrial engineer specialized in marketing, advertising, digital media, telecommunications and entertainment.

== Career ==
She studied industrial engineering studies at the Andrés Bello Catholic University in her home city Caracas and holds a master's degree in Business Administration from Columbia Business School in New York. She is founder and former president of the Interactive Advertising Bureau (IAB) and co-founder and member of the Academic Council of the Instituto Superior para el Desarrollo de Internet (ISDI) in Mexico.

She is a member of the International Women Forum (Mexico), as well as a mentor for entrepreneurships such as Endeavor Mexico, Wayra Mexico and Naranya Labs.

She has worked in digital agencies such as Clarus, Mirum or J Walter Thompson and in technology companies such as ProdigyMSN. She has also been a consultant for firms such as The Boston Consulting Group and Booz-Allen & Hamilton International. In September 2016, she was named Twitter's general manager for Spanish-speaking markets in Latin America, specifically Mexico, Colombia and Argentina. In March 2017, she became the first woman to become CEO of Google Mexico.

== Awards and recognition ==
She has been recognized with the Women to Watch Mexico and by the Mexico Interactive Advertising Bureau (IAB), the latter for being considered one of the 10 personalities who have contributed the most to the digital advertising and interactive marketing industry. She was named one of the 50 most influential people in Technology in Latin America by HITE.

She was also among the “top CEOs in Mexico” and “top 20 executive women in Mexico” by the Mujer Ejecutiva magazine in December 2004 and 2005. Expansión magazine named her among the “20 most influential women in business in Mexico” in February 2003 and as one of the “50 most powerful women in Mexico” in November 2006.

== Personal life ==
Arnal lives in Mexico City with her husband and three children.
