= Valentina Quintero =

Venezuelan journalist, environmental activist, radio and television hostess

- Born: Valentina Quintero Montiel; 28 June 1954 (age 72); Caracas, Venezuela
- Occupations: Journalist, television hostess, writer

Valentina Quintero Montiel (born 28 June 1954) is a Venezuelan journalist and environmental activist, explored Venezuela's most emblematic places, hosted radio and television shows and wrote books, diaries, magazines and newspapers.

== Biography ==
She was educated at the Colegio San José de Tarbes "La Florida" in Caracas, from kindergarten to the fifth year of humanities, and continued her studies at the Universidad Católica Andrés Bello, graduating in 1976 with a degree in social communication, audiovisual mention.

With the Gran Mariscal de Ayacucho Scholarship, she completed a Master's degree in Educational Technology at Boston University in the United States.

In 1980, after several medical treatments to increase her fertility, her only daughter, Arianna Arteaga Quintero, was born.

In 1981, without neglecting the attention that motherhood demanded, she returned to Venezuela to pursue her goal: "What ignited my spirit was education through audiovisual media to change the world". In 1982, she began working at the National Library alongside Virginia Betancourt, where she remained for seven years.

== Career ==
Her first incursion in television was in “Valentina TV”, on CMT. It did not last long due to the channel's problems. In 1994, the television program Bitácora was aired once a month, on Sundays on RCTV, which continued airing for over fifteen years.

In 2018, she was chosen as one of the 100 most influential women of the year according to the BBC.

== Personal life ==
She is the daughter of Tony Quintero and Ana Carlota Montiel de Quintero, and has two older siblings, Cristóbal and Susana, and two younger siblings, Inés and Antonio.
