= Andrés Bello Catholic University =

Private university in Venezuela

Coordinates: 10°27′51.37″N 66°58′33.37″W

- Universidad Católica Andrés Bello
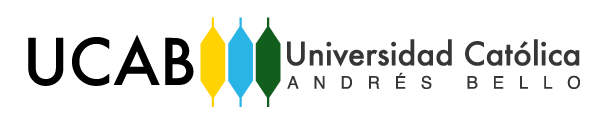
- Seal of Andrés Bello Catholic University
- Motto: Ut innotescat multiformis sapientia Dei
- Motto in English: To make known the manifold wisdom of God
- Type: Private
- Established: October 23, 1953; 73 years ago
- Affiliations: Society of Jesus
- Chancellor: Jorge Urosa
- Vice-Chancellor: Arturo Peraza S.J.
- Rector: José Virtuoso S.J.
- Location: Caracas, Distrito Capital, Venezuela
- Campus: Urban
- Colors: Blue, white and yellow
- Website: www.ucab.edu.ve

Andrés Bello Catholic University (Spanish: Universidad Católica Andrés Bello) is a private university in Venezuela. One of the largest universities in Venezuela, UCAB has campuses in several cities, such as Caracas (main campus), Los Teques, Guayana, and Coro.

Named for Venezuelan writer Andrés Bello, UCAB was founded in October 1953 by the Society of Jesus (Episcopado Venezolano a la Compañía de Jesús). In 2025, it was ranked as the third best and top private university in Venezuela.

== Programs ==
Academic departments of the school include that of Economics and Social Sciences, Humanities and Education, Engineering, Theology, and the Law School. All faculties also offer postgraduate education. The university publications deal mainly with human rights issues and cultural topics. In 2013 the university opened its new library with the goal of delivering state-of-the-art services to faculty and students, including its Cultural Center and Resources for Learning and Research. The university also offers on-line courses and distance learning.

In 2016, UCAB law students took first place in the Spanish version of the International Criminal Court Moot Competition at The Hague. The university's Model United Nations team has been active since 1996, and has won the best delegation award at Harvard University.

== Notable alumni ==
Among its notable graduates are:

- José Antonio Abreu (orchestra conductor, economist, political activist)
- Milos Alcalay (Venezuelan diplomat)
- María Teresa Arnal (industrial engineer)
- Ivonne Attas (actress and politician)
- Henrique Capriles (lawyer and governor)
- María Corina Machado, (Nobel Peace Prize laurate, engineer, Assembly member, founder of Súmate)
- Valentina Quintero (author, journalist and television hostess)
- Édgar Ramírez (journalist and actor)
- Nery Santos Gómez (author)

== See also ==
- Education in Venezuela
- List of Jesuit sites
- List of universities in Venezuela
