= Inter (Venezuelan broadcaster) =

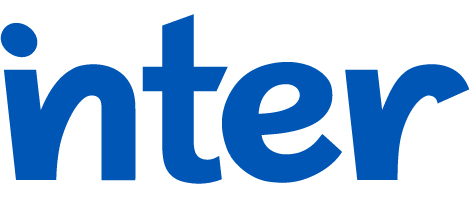
Inter logo

Inter is a Venezuelan television broadcaster and telecommunications provider headquartered in Barquisimeto, Lara, Venezuela. Inter was founded in 1996 as InterCable. Its fiscal name is Corporacion Telemic C.A, and its main shareholder is the investment fund HM Capital Partners.

== History ==
Inter started operations in 1996 in the city of Barquisimeto, and expanded its coverage to more than 100 cities and towns in the Venezuelan territory, being one of the main cable television operators in the country, in addition to providing broadband and fixed telephony services.

Inter has a hybrid network of optical fiber and coaxial cable that allows access to cable television services and broadband internet using the existing CATV networks connecting the subscriber by means of a coaxial cable to a zone node and later Interconnecting the zonal nodes with optical fiber, with a network that encompasses over 4 thousand kilometers of optical fiber.

The Inter platform has bandwidths of 750 and 840 MHz, suitable for bidirectional transmissions. This network has the capacity to transmit more than 500 television channels as well as provide high-speed Internet access and voice and data transmissions for telephone service.

In August 2012, Inter launched a satellite television service based on the platform of the Chilean company TuVes HD adding Venezuelan channels. The platform uses the Telstar 12 satellite signal based on MPEG4 technology that allows high-quality signal compression allowing it to include high definition channels.

=== Current Situation ===
Over the last two years, the company has reduced its original offer of satellite and cable TV channels and broadband Internet plans, also, the quality of the service, customer support and the constant rise of fares have changed the perception of the company into one of bad cost-quality relation, specially around the internet services, the company has ceased to cover some areas of the country and degraded service in others. The poor quality of customer and technical support often leave users waiting for an answer or a solution, making some of them leave the company for other providers or hire cable TV only.

== Products ==
Inter offers digital cable TV services since 2002 and digital satellite television as of August 2012, currently providing up to 125 different channels, some featured products are:

- Video on Demand (VOD)
- HD Channels: The company offers sports, series, documentaries and cinema channels in high definition, which can only be seen using a specific digital decoder for this technology.

=== Broadband Internet ===
The company currently offers the following internet access plans:

- 2 Mb
- 4 Mb
- 10 Mb (corporative clients, subject to availability)

The company used to offer a wider variety of plans, now narrowed to the three listed above.

=== Fixed Digital Telephony ===
Inter offers VoIP (Voice over IP) telephony service, with one basic plan with rates charged in seconds and unlimited calls between telephones of the same company, offering the particularity of moving the Unused second balance the next month.
