= William H. Phelps Sr. =

American ornithologist and businessman (1875–1965)

William H. Phelps
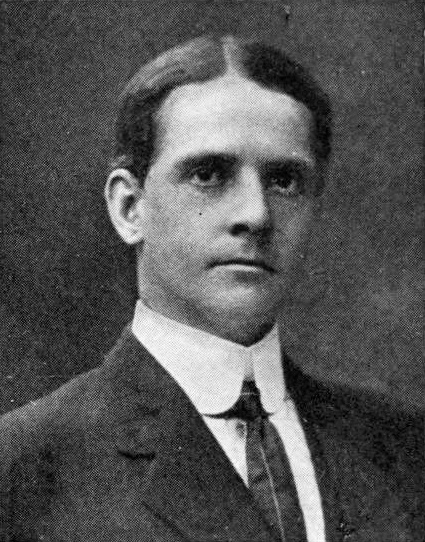
- Born: June 14, 1875; New York City, US
- Died: December 8, 1965 (aged 90); Caracas, Venezuela
- Education: Harvard College
- Known for: 239 new taxa
- Awards: Brewster Medal 1955
- Scientific career
- Fields: Ornithology
- Doctoral advisor: Frank M. Chapman

William Henry Phelps Sr. (June 14, 1875 – December 8, 1965) was an American ornithologist and businessman. One of his sons, William H. Phelps Jr., was also an ornithologist, and collaborated with him. William Phelps was the founder of the William Phelps Ornithological Collection, located in Sabana Grande. This is still the most important private ornithological collection of the world.

== Early life ==
Born in New York City to Dudley F. Phelps, and of Louise Lander Prince Phelps, he attended Milton Academy and Harvard College. In the summer of 1896 he decided to go on a journey of ornithological exploration to Venezuela following the advice of Wirt Robinson, who had visited Margarita Island the year before, and from his mentor Frank M. Chapman. He went to the ports of Puerto Cabello and La Guaira to finally explore a region near Cumaná. After a long stay in the states of Sucre and Monagas, he became fascinated with the country and its birds. In San Antonio de Maturín, he met a family of British settlers, the Tuckers, and felt in love with one of the daughters, Alicia Elvira.

He returned to the United States with a small collection of specimens that he brought to Chapman at the American Museum of Natural History. The specimens he collected became the basis for his first essay published with Chapman in 1897.

== Settling in Venezuela ==
Once he finished his studies at Harvard, Phelps returned to Venezuela in 1897, to marry Alicia Elvira Tucker and settle in Maturín. There he began one of many successful business ventures by selling coffee. His first two children, John and William Henry Jr., were born during that time. This second son, William H. Phelps Jr., became one of his foremost collaborators in all matters concerning ornithology. In 1938 he founded the Phelps Collection considered the largest ornithological collection in Latin America and the largest private collection in the world. It is a mandatory study resource on tropical birds for experts who wish to know more about this area. Currently the Phelps Collection has a heritage of 80,000 birds in feathers, a thousand preserved in alcohol and 1,500 skeletons.

William H. Phelps also founded Radio Caracas Radio.

== Legacy ==
William H. Phelps and his family are commemorated in the scientific name of a species of Venezuelan lizard, Cercosaura phelpsorum.

== Works ==
- (With John Todd Zimmer and Ernest Thomas Gilliard). "A new race of the honey-creeper, Diglossa cyanea, from Venezuela". (New York: American Museum of Natural History, 1952).
- (With John Todd Zimmer). "New subspecies of birds from Surinam and Venezuela". (New York: American Museum of Natural History, 1951).
- (With William H. Phelps Jr.). "Lista de las aves de Venezuela con su distribución ". (Caracas: Editorial Grafolit, 1950). (in Spanish).
- (With John Todd Zimmer). "A new name for Basileuterus culicivorus roraimae ". (New York: American Museum of Natural History, 1949).
