= William H. Phelps Jr. =

Venezuelan ornithologist

- Phelps during the first expedition to the Cerro La Neblina, 1954
- Born: 25 December 1902; San Antonio de Maturín, Monagas, Venezuela
- Died: 13 August 1988 (aged 85); Caracas, Venezuela
- Education: Princeton University
- Known for: 137 new taxa
- Scientific career
- Fields: Ornithology

William Henry Phelps Jr. (December 25, 1902 – August 13, 1988) was a Venezuelan ornithologist and businessman.

== Early life ==
He was born in San Antonio de Maturín, a town located in Monagas, Venezuela. Along with his father, William Henry Phelps, he founded the first commercial radio station in Venezuela, 1 Broadcasting Caracas.

== Career ==
After finishing his studies at Lawrenceville School and getting a BSc in 1926 from Princeton University, he published over 78 books on the birds of Venezuela with his wife Katherine Deery Phelps, in which they described their discovery of more than 200 new species. Together they organized about 100 expeditions that helped collect over 1,000 species of birds. A direct result of his research was the creation of the Venezuelan Museum of Ornithology with one of the most important libraries and collections in South America. In recognition of his research the University of Exeter created a fellowship in his honor to fund Venezuelan graduate students interested in zoology. In 1953 he founded one of the most important Venezuelan television stations, Radio Caracas Televisión, and served as its president for 34 years. He died in the city of Caracas.

== Works ==
- Las aves de Perijá Caracas: Casa de Especialidades, 1944
- Resumen de las colecciones ornitológicas en Venezuela Caracas: Casa de Especialidades, 1945
- Contribución del Dr. Frank M. Chapman à la ornitología venezolana Caracas: Casa de Especialidades, 1946
- Descripción de cuatro aves nuevas de los cerros Paraque y Ptri-Tepui y notas sobre Bubulcus ibis, Myioborus cardonal y Platycichla leuocops Caracas: Casa de Especialidades, 1946
- Descripción de seis aves nuevas de Venezuela y notas sobre veinticuatro adiciones à la avifauna del Brasil Caracas: Tipografía La Nación, 1948
- Notas sobre aves venezolanas Caracas: Tipografía El Compás, 1948
- Las aves de Bonaire Caracas: Tipografía La Nación, 1951
- Las aves de las islas Los Roques y Las Aves y descripción de un nuevo canario de mangle Caracas: Tipografía La Nación, 1951
- El posible hundimiento parcial de isla de Aves Caracas: Litografía del Comercio, 1953
- Las aves de la isla de Patos, con algunos documentos sobre la historia y la geología de la isla Caracas: Sociedad Venezolana de Ciencias Naturales, 1958
- La aves de la isla La Orchila Caracas: Editorial Sucre, 1959
- Cuarenta y nueve aves nuevas para la avifauna del cerro Uei-Tepui (Cerro del Sol) Caracas: Editorial Sucre, 1962
- Lista de las aves de Venezuela con su distribución 2nd ed. Caracas: Editorial Sucre, 1963
- (with Rodolphe Meyer de Schauensee) A Guide to the Birds of Venezuela Princeton University Press : 1978. ISBN 0-691-08205-7
- (with Ramón Aveledo Ostos) Dos nuevas subespecies de aves (Troglodytidae, Fringillidae) del cerro Marahuaca, territorio Amazonas Caracas Editorial Sucre, 1984
- (with Rodolphe Meyer de Schauensee) Una guía de las aves de Venezuela 2nd ed. Caracas: Ex Libris, 1993.
