= Empresas 1BC =

Venezuelan media company

Centro Corporativo 1BC
- Trade name: Empresas 1BC
- Company type: Private
- Industry: Broadcasting (Radio and Television), Retail
- Founded: 1920
- Founder: William H. Phelps Jr.
- Headquarters: Caracas, Venezuela
- Key people: Marcel Granier (President & CEO)
- Subsidiaries: 92.9 tu FM; Etheron; Fono Video; Radio Caracas Television; Radio Caracas Radio; Recordland; Sonografica

Empresas 1BC (also known as Grupo Phelps, Centro Corporativo 1BC, and Grupo 1BC) is a privately owned Venezuelan corporation which operates diverse media enterprises such as Radio Caracas Televisión, Etheron, Radio Caracas Radio, 92.9 tu FM, Sonográfica, FonoVideo, Recordland, and Radionet, to name a few. This conglomerate is headed by Marcel Granier and headquartered in Caracas, Venezuela.

== History ==
The origins of this company dates back to the year 1920, when William Henry Phelps returned to Venezuela from the United States after receiving a degree from Princeton University. In the year 1929, his family established the first holding company, Sindicato Phelps, C.A., in which various businesses, such as real estate and automotive companies, were consolidated. The development of the communications sector began in 1930, when (with the support of RCA) Phelps established the Broadcasting Caracas, the first commercial radio station in Venezuela. In 1935, the Broadcasting Caracas became known as Radio Caracas, and then later, Radio Caracas Radio (RCR). Radio Caracas Televisión (RCTV) was created in 1953. Until then, the Phelps owned Ondas Populares, RCR, and RCTV. Businesses formerly owned by the Phelps included: El Automóvil Universal and El Almacén Americano (an electronics store). The growth of the television business in the 70s, favored a consolidation of the company, which hired new people such as Marcel Granier, Peter Bottome, and Guillermo Tucker.

In the 1980s, Empresas 1BC began to explore other types of industries. They started up the newspaper El Diario de Caracas, which on July 11, 1995, ceased publication. Three years later, El Diario de Caracas was purchased and restarted by the editors of Caracas's English language newspaper, The Daily Journal.

== Assets ==
- 92.9 tu FM
- Etheron
- Fonovideo
- Radio Caracas Radio
- RCTV
- Recordland
- Sonográfica
