= RCTV =

Defunct Venezuelan television station

Radio Caracas Televisión (RCTV)
- Final logo used from April 16 to May 27, 2007.
- Type: Free-to-air television network
- Country: Venezuela
- Headquarters: Caracas, Venezuela

Programming
- Language: Spanish
- Picture format: 480i SDTV

Ownership
- Owner: Empresas 1BC
- Key people: Marcel Granier; Peter Bottome; Eladio Lárez (Pres., RCTV)

History
- Launched: 15 November 1953; 72 years ago
- Founder: William H. Phelps Jr.
- Closed: 27 May 2007; 19 years ago
- Replaced by: RCTV Internacional (cable and satellite); TVes (free-to-air frequencies)

Radio Caracas Televisión (RCTV and sometimes referred to as the Canal de Bárcenas) was a Venezuelan free-to-air television network headquartered in the Caracas neighborhood of Quinta Crespo and owned by Empresas 1BC. Radio Caracas Televisión (RCTV) was inaugurated on 15 November 1953 by William H. Phelps, Jr.

Its radio counterpart was Radio Caracas Radio.

On 27 May 2007, President Hugo Chávez decided to shut down the channel by refusing to renew their broadcast concession, accusing the channel of being involved in the 2002 coup d'état in Venezuela, which briefly overthrew his government. The Supreme Tribunal of Justice (TSJ) upheld the National Commission of Telecommunications (CONATEL) decision. RCTV continued to broadcast via pay television on RCTV Internacional. In January 2010, RCTV was sanctioned with temporary closure. It rejected the Venezuelan media regulator's finding that it was a domestic media provider.

On 7 September 2015, the Inter-American Court of Human Rights ruled that the refusal to renew the concession was an "indirect restriction on the exercise of freedom of expression [...] aimed at impeding the communication and circulation of ideas and opinions", that the government violated the right to due process and that it must restore the concession for RCTV. The Venezuelan government has ignored the ruling.

In 2010, the Council on Foreign Relations described RCTV as "the most important independent television station in Venezuela".

== History ==
=== 1953 to 1960 ===
RCTV's logo from 1962 to November 30, 1979

Radio Caracas Televisión, C.A. was established on 18 August 1953 by the Corporación Radiofónica de Venezuela (more commonly known as Coraven, a subsidiary of the Grupo Phelps and RCA), whose mission was that of launching a television network. In the month of September, Radio Caracas Televisión (RCTV) began test broadcasts on channel seven using the call sign YVKS-TV, and on 15 November, the network was officially inaugurated at 7:30 pm. RCTV was the third television network to begin operations in Venezuela after Televisora Nacional and Televisa, seen on channels five and four, respectively, and the second commercial network after Televisa.

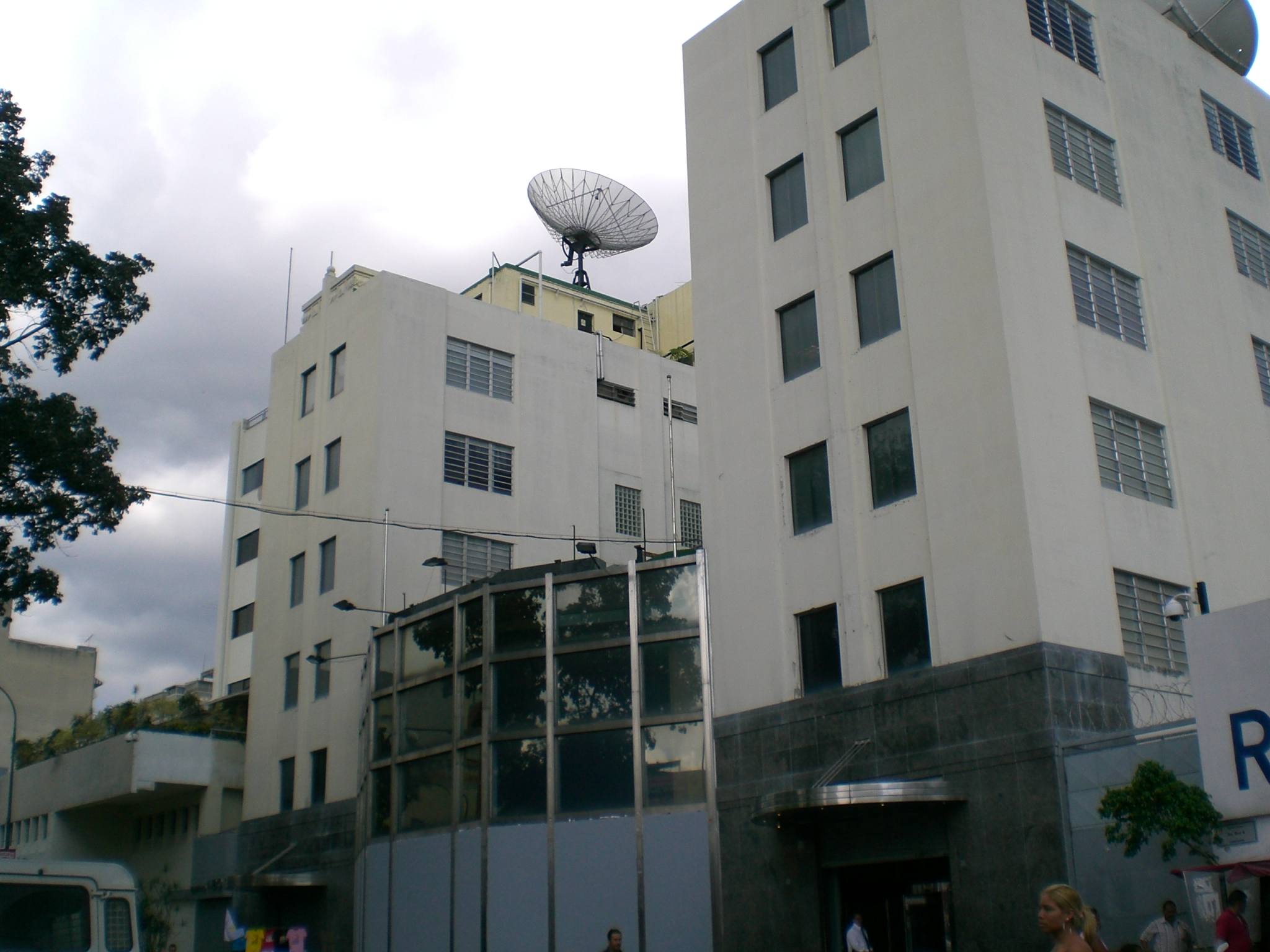
RCTV headquarters in Caracas

On 8 October, during RCTV's testing phase, the inaugural game of the XIV World Cup of Baseball was broadcast. This game matched Cuba and Venezuela and took place at the recently opened stadium of the Ciudad Universitaria de Caracas.

The official inauguration of RCTV took place at its studios located between the corners of Bárcenas and Río in Quinta Crespo, and had the presence of the Minister of Communications, Colonel Félix Román Moreno, the proprietors of the network, and a small group of special guests. In charge of the inauguration was William H. Phelps, Jr., the founding president of the new company, and his wife, Kathy Phelps.

The first program that was aired by the newly inaugurated network was the musical Fiesta, which hosted by Ramírez Cabrera and sponsored by Cerveza Caracas. Afterwards, RCTV aired a program titled El Farol, which was then followed by a program sponsored by Cigarrillos Alas that was directed by Peggy Walker which featured Alfredo Sadel (who had just returned from New York City in time for RCTV's inauguration).

The first voice that identified the network was that of Héctor Myerston.

The following day, RCTV began transmitting its regular programming on channel 7 on the VHF band, presenting programs such as 'El Observador Creole', Cuento Musical Venezolano, Tontín y Tontona, the police adventures of Roy Martin, and the adventures of Kid Carson, to name a few. El Observador Creole was Venezuela's first regular newscast, presented by the Creole Petroleum Corporation (a subsidiary of Standard Oil of New Jersey). At the start, Francisco Amado Pernía hosted the then new news program from Monday to Saturday and on Sunday the newscast had Cristóbal Rodríquez Pantoja as presenter. El Observador Creole remained on the air for almost twenty years, being replaced by El Observador Venezolano, and then relaunched as El Observador.

RCTV's first board of directors included José Marcano Coello, Peter Bottome, Armando Enrique Guía, Guillermo Tucker Arismendi, William H. Phelps, Jr., and Antonio Ortol.

In 1954, Anecdotario appeared. This was the first cultural program that theatrically represented great works of literature. It was directed by Margarita Gelabert and César Henríquez. Other cultural programs similar to Anecdotario included Kaleidoscopio, Teatro del Lunes, Gran Teatro, Ciclorama, Cuentos del Camino, and Candilejas.

Later that year, RCTV debuted their first telenovela, Camay, which was on at 9:00 p.m. As a result of Camay's popularity, RCTV began producing more telenovelas, which became an important part of the network's programming throughout the years. In the 1950s, telenovelas contained between 20 and 25 episodes, with each episode lasting 15 minutes (about three minutes were allocated to advertisements), and were televised live.

The speakers Francisco José Croquer, René Estévez, Abelardo Raidi, and Julián Mariño Jiménez were pioneers of early Venezuelan sports broadcasting. Long before RCTV dominated the TV screen, these names built their massive reputations on the radio.

In December 1954, RCTV began broadcasting simultaneously on channels two, seven and ten.

In early 1955, RCTV began to transmit exclusively to Caracas, on channel two, from a new transmitting station located in the neighborhood of La Colina in which it remained the main frequency until the network's closure on 27 May 2007 after the government of president Hugo Chavez refused to renew the broadcasting license. In the month of July, RCTV began its regular service to the interior of the country. A repeater antenna was installed in Altamira, south of Lake Valencia, allowing RCTV to reach, by way of channel seven, Valencia, Maracay, and surrounding towns. Later, RCTV put into service their repeater antenna in Curimagua, Falcón State, so that their signal could reach the entire state and the Netherlands Antilles on channel 10. This station was one of the most modern stations in the moment of its installation.

Also in 1955, the morning show that projected Renny Ottolina to national fame made its national premiere. Lo de Hoy came on at 7:30 a.m. and lasted until 9:00 a.m. It was an adaptation of NBC's Today Show, and as a result of the record audience that it obtained, the show was extended to two hours. In 1958, Ottolina left Lo de Hoy, and went on to host his very own variety show, El Show de Renny.

In March 1956, the operations of the repeater station of Isla de Toas commenced, by which, on channel two, RCTV's signal arrived in Zulia State. In September 1956, RCTV installed an antenna in Pariata, to serve what is now Vargas State.

In 1957, RCTV expanded their coverage to reach almost all of Venezuela, offering an uninterrupted signal of high quality.

In January 1957, RCTV improved their installations at Curimagua and were able to offer an uninterrupted and higher quality signal to the Falcon State and the Netherlands Antilles. The network also began service to the state of Lara by way of channel three, transmitting from Mount Manzano in Barquisimeto. On 31 October 1957, RCTV began its first service from Puerto La Cruz to cover the northeastern region of Venezuela on channel 3 via relay.

In 1958, after the fall of dictator Marcos Pérez Jiménez on 23 January of that year, RCTV began airing La Voz de la Revolución, the first political talk show to air in Venezuela. On 15 July 1958 Los Melódicos made their performance debut on RCTV programme Su Revista Musical.

In 1959, Tito Martinez Del Box, a producer from Argentina, created the comedy series La Gran Cruzada del Buen Humor, later known as Radio Rochela. In 2001, Radio Rochela made the Guinness World Records for being on the air for over five decades uninterrupted (it was seen every Monday at 8:00 pm).

By the end of the 1950s, there existed five television channels in Venezuela: the state channel Televisora Nacional and private channels Televisa, Radio Caracas Televisión, Televisa del Zulia, and Ondas del Lago Televisión.

=== 1960 to 1970 ===
By the 1960s, the American television network, CBS, had purchased a twenty percent stake in RCTV.

In 1961, RCTV, with the help of their radio counterpart, began their first experiments with stereo sound during the broadcast of a variety show.

On 17 September 1961, RCTV put into use their first videotape system, a technology which permitted the consolidation of recordings of sounds and images.

Also in 1961, a major fire affected eighty percent of the operating facilities of the network. As a result of this event, RCTV went on the air with an emergency programming.

Later in 1961, the network expanded its broadcasts to the city of Puerto Cabello from an antenna located at the naval base in that city.

In 1962, RCTV, in a resolve to demonstrating a technological advancement for the network, began producing its programs electronically through a locally manufactured editing machine for camera footage.

Also in 1962, RCTV began broadcasts to the state of Táchira and the Norte de Santander Department in Colombia from a transmitter located in the high barren plain of El Zumbador.

On 24 August 1963, RCTV was given the exclusive rights to broadcast the inauguration of the General Rafael Urdaneta Bridge over Lake Maracaibo. On this day, RCTV launched their first transmission via microwave transmitters from the antennas in Curimagua and Maracaibo. The use of the electronic pointer was incorporated.

On every 17 December between the years 1963 and 1969, RCTV presented, and reran by popular demand, a made-for-TV movie that re-created the death of Simón Bolívar. Written by Alfredo Cortina, starred by the Peruvian actor Luis Muñoz Lecaro (Simón Bolívar), directed by José Antonio Ferrara, and presented by Ruben Darío Villasmil, El Ocaso de un Sol made its mark by being one of the first productions by RCTV recorded on videotape.

In 1964, RCTV began using their new transmitters located in the mountains southeast of Puerto la Cruz and Barcelona to offer a higher quality signal by way of channel three to Isla Margarita, Cumaná, Barcelona, Puerto La Cruz, and surrounding areas in the states of Sucre and Anzoátegui. Later, RCTV inaugurated the transmitters on Pico Terepaima, to the south of Barquisimeto, to serve with quality the states of Lara, Yaracuy, and Portuguesa by way of channel three, and the one in Maracaibo, covering with better image and sound the state Zulia. In November, from Pico Zamuro, Trujillo, RCTV began transmitting its signal to the towns of Trujillo, Valera, Biscucuy, Boconó, Guanare, and their surrounding areas.

In the 1960s, the number of episodes contained in each telenovela increased, with each one episode lasting between 30 and 60 minutes long, also telenovelas were no longer made live as a result of the arrival of the videotape technologies. By 1964, telenovelas with sole sponsors disappeared with the release of La Novela del Hogar (which came on at 2:00 p.m.), La Novela de Pasión (which came on at 2:25 p.m.), and La Novela Romantica (which came on at 2:55 p.m.).

On February 3, 1965, Ottolina began hosting another show on RCTV called Renny Presenta (Renny Presents...). Renny Presenta... mostly featured music and was co-hosted by Ivan Valdez.

On 16 May 1965, RCTV placed into service their transmitters at the Mérida cable car. Thanks to this equipment, RCTV's signal covered the entire Andean region of Venezuela.

The 600-episode telenovela El Derecho de Nacer, created by Félix B. Caignet and starring among others Raúl Amundaray, Conchita Obach and Amalia Pérez Díaz, which debuted in 1966, would help define the network's drama programming in the latter half of the decade. La Tirana (1967, created by Manuel Muñoz Rico), was the first telenovela to be aired on Saturdays.

By 1967, there were seven television networks on the air in Venezuela. They included Radio Caracas Televisión, Venevisión, Cadena Venezolana de Televisión (CVTV), Canal 11 Televisión, Televisora Nacional in Caracas, Teletrece in Valencia, and Canal 11 in Maracaibo. Because of the exaggerated number of channels, both for the audience and the national publicity market, this number, at the beginning of the 1970s, was reduced to four (two private and two official).

In 1968, RCTV launched Sabado Espectacular, a variety show created and hosted by Amador Bendayan. The show later moved to Venevision, where it was renamed Sabado Sensacional and is currently known as Super Sabado Sensacional hosted by Leonardo Villalobos.

On 17 July 1969, RCTV brought to their viewers the first international broadcast: a news conference with the Apollo 11 American astronauts that were traveling to the Moon the next day. On 20 July, RCTV broadcast live and direct the arrival of these astronauts to the Moon. Armando Enrique Guía, Hernán Pérez Belisario, and Gustavo Rada were in charge of the transmission which counted a satellital antenna, a channel of microwave transmitters and a submarine cable.

=== 1970 to 1980 ===
RCTV's logo from 1 December 1979 to 8 November 1996

On May 31, 1970, Radio Caracas Televisión (RCTV) broadcast the World Cup from Mexico live and exclusively—marking the first time a World Cup was shown live via satellite on Venezuelan television featuring the voices of Pedro Zarraga, Felo Jimenez, and Carlos Jose Motamayor. Also at that time began using the first chromatic signals during the broadcast of the World Cup in Mexico. Unfortunately, by pressure from the government, the network was obligated to use electronic filters.

On 16 November 1971, Producciones Cinematográficas Paramaconi, C.A., a company affiliated with RCTV that specializes in cinematography, was established.

On 30 August 1973, RCTV inaugurated a transmitting station in Punta de Mulatos, between La Guaira and Macuto, to offer a better signal in the region. It was the same year that RCTV launched the country's first major kids' program, Popy (featuring Diony Lopez in the title role of a clown), which ran for 13 seasons (1973 to 1986), a program that would set the standard for children's programming.

On 23 June 1974, RCTV signed on new transmitters officially debuting broadcasts via Channel 3 on Ciudad Bolívar, and in July the Puerto Ordaz transmitter signed on, bringing network programming on Channel 2 in that area.

In 1974, the miniseries Doña Bárbara began airing. In just 48 episodes each lasting two hours, José Ignacio Cabrujas brought to television the classic novel authored by Rómulo Gallegos in 1929 and later creating into a trilogy with Canaima and Cantaclaro. Under the direction of the Argentine producer Juan Lamata and with César Bolívar in charge of photography, eighty percent of this production was filmed outdoors (mainly in the llanos of the Apure State). Although it was filmed in color (RCTV was the second network to begin broadcasting in color after VTV in 1971 produced what would be the republic's first ever color TV program), it was broadcast in black and white. This was the first Venezuelan miniseries that was later broadcast to countries in Europe and the first program dubbed into another language as well as its first ever color production.

In the mid-1970s, RCTV created the 2 de Oro award as an incentive for the network's artists and talents. The most recent 2 de Oro was held on 15 April 2007. The 2 de Oro 2004 was held 7 November 2004, and the 2 de Oro 2003 was held on 7 November 2003 (there was no 2 de Oro awards in 2005 and 2006). Other (defunct) award shows that aired on RCTV were the Ronda and Meridiano.

In 1975, RCTV began selling broadcasting rights to some of its programs to television companies overseas, with some of them being translated and dubbed into more than 15 languages and transmitted in more than 40 countries. The three hundred episode telenovela, La Usurpadora, was RCTV's first telenovela broadcast abroad.

Also in 1975, RCTV launched Alerta, a controversial current affairs program that took a look into various social situations in Venezuela. Shortly after Luis Herrera Campins assumed the presidency in 1979, Alerta was taken off the air as a result of a highly controversial report that was conducted on the children's mental hospital located in Catia La Mar. Alerta, as well as Primer Plano and A Puerta Cerrada (the latter to a lesser extent), would make a comeback, get cancelled, make another comeback, and get cancelled again before making another comeback. The latest reincarnation of Alerta began airing on 27 October 2006 and was hosted by Alexandra Belandia. Alerta was originally hosted by Eladio Larez, the future president of RCTV.

On 31 March 1976, RCTV's transmissions were suspended for 72 hours by the first government of Carlos Andrés Pérez for issuing "false and tendacious news", in regard to the kidnapping of the American businessman William Niehous, then president of Owens-Illinois Venezuela. This was RCTV's first shut down by the government.

In 1977, the "cultural telenovela" appeared with La Hija de Juana Crespo and then La Señora de Cárdenas, with both of them captivating their audience with stories that went from the wish of over coming economically and professionally, to infidelity and turbulent marriages.

On 5 January 1978, there was another major fire at RCTV's studios. Fortunately, this fire was nowhere near as damaging as the fire of 1961. It was the very same year that it began test color broadcasts for special events only.

On 15 November 1978, the Fundación Academia de Ciencias y Artes del Cine y Televisión (the Academic Foundation of Sciences and Arts of Film and Television) was founded by William H. Phelps. This academy allowed RCTV to give the opportunity to prepare and train their artists and workers.

The government of Luis Herrera Campins (1979), by decree, began permitting the use of color in television and the American color system, NTSC-M, was adopted. On 1 December 1979, RCTV began broadcasting in color. Unfortunately, this decree allowed only cultural productions to transmit under this format. Estefanía was RCTV's first production broadcast in color. And weeks after the official transition to color, RCTV, together with Venevision, became the official broadcasters of that year's OTI Festival, held at the Theater Hall of the Military Academy of Venezuela, in full color.

=== 1980 to 1990 ===
RCTV's secondary logo from 1984 to 1987

In 1980, RCTV began airing the miniseries Gómez I and Gómez II wrighted by José Ignacio Cabrujas, which told the story of the dictator Juan Vicente Gómez, portrayed by leading actor Rafael Briceño. Although they were both a phenomenon, José Ignacio Cabrujas and RCTV were sued for 15 million bolívares (about 13 billion bolívares just before 2008, which converts to 13 million bolívares fuertes) because of its historical errors and "injuring the moral patrimony of the descendants and family of General Gómez".

Television networks in Venezuela, whom were already prepared for the change and had occasionally transmitted in this format, made the complete switch-over to color on June 1, 1980.

According to an article published in the Caracas daily newspaper, El Nacional, dated 27 September 1981, RCTV was admonished by the national government for having announced prematurely the death of ex-president Rómulo Betancourt. The Minister of Communications, Vinicio Carrera, by instructions of President Luis Herrera Campins, was in charge of admonishing RCTV "very severely".

In 1982, Coral International was created to sell and distribute RCTV's programs overseas. In 2005, Coral International changed its name to RCTV International to honor its parent company. The same year RCTV became a pioneer station to use the Scanimate system of computer graphics for its on-air presentation and program graphics.

It was in 1986 that the private television networks in Venezuela began using satellite dishes to downlink international signals for their use.

1986 was also the year of Cristal, a telenovela of 246 episodes which broke audience records both inside and outside of Venezuela. In Spain, Cristal was aired since 1988 to 1993 on seven different time periods. Later that year, RCTV launched another major production, called La Dama de Rosa, which in 1991 was seen by seven million people in Spain alone. As a result, RCTV made a record US$12 million from the sales of their telenovelas overseas. Both soaps, based on works by Rómulo Gallegos, formed part of a series of TV adaptations from the works of the Venezuelan writer and former president.

Also in 1986, Expedición, the first ecological and conservationist series produced in Venezuela began airing, which converted RCTV into a pioneering network in this genre. This series was exported to other countries, particularly the United States, Spain, and Japan. Expedición aired until 1998 and contained a total of 48 episodes.

On 13 August 1988, William H. Phelps, Jr., RCTV's founder and first president died at age 85. He had served as RCTV's president for 34 years, retiring from the network only a year before his death.

By 1987–1988, the network was being promoted in a series of station idents and 30-second commercials as Venezuela's Television, following the mid-decade First Class Television campaign.

=== 1990 to 2000 ===
RCTV's logo from 9 November 1996 to 16 April 2007

During the first years of the 1990s, RCTV developed a series of made-for-TV-movies. Some were based on real life events. Among the most highlighted were La Madamme (with Mimí Lazo), Cuerpos Clandestinos (with María Conchita Alonso), Volver a Ti (with Ruddy Rodríguez), and Buen Corazón (with Coraima Torres), among many others.

In 1990, RCTV became the second TV network in Venezuela to use computer-generated imagery for its on-air idents.

On 1 August 1991, the Venezuelan government forced RCTV not to air a sketch in Radio Rochela, called "La Escuelita", due to its controversial nature. This decision was ratified by the Supreme Court.

By 1992, RCTV had lost much of its audience to its main rival, Venevisión, but after the launch of Por Estas Calles, RCTV, in terms of viewer ratings, had slowly regained its lead as the nation's no.1 station. This resulted in Venevisión to cancel its contract with Marte TV (Channel 12; now La Tele), and as a result Marte TV nearly entered bankruptcy.

Also in 1992, Kassandra based on a gipsy love theme, was the first Venezuelan telenovela that arrived in the Japanese market. This production was translated in eighty languages and was placed into the Guinness Book of World Records for being the most sold telenovela series in history. The protagonists Coraima Torres and Osvaldo Rios were extremely successful in Italy, Russia, former Eastern Bloc nations, the republics of the former Yugoslavia, as well as the Middle East, south and east Asia.

In 1993, for the first time, RCTV combined cartoons with real actors in one of their productions. Created by Mariela Romero, the telenovela Dulce Ilusión was converted into a modern version of "Cinderella".

In 1994 and 1995, with objectives to obtain the best sharpness and resolution of colors, RCTV inaugurated the first studio that utilized component video technology. In 1996 upon its major on-air revamp, RCTV switched from using analog video to serial digital interface, a first for a Venezuelan TV network.

In 1997, RCTV was the first network in Latin America that automated their informative services (from the making of its contents until its airing), in which they adopted DVCPRO.

On 4 December 1998, the testing phase began for Vale TV (Valores Educativos Televisión), a non-profit private enterprise co-owned by the Archdiocese of Caracas and the three leading private television networks in Venezuela (RCTV, Venevisión, and Televen).

In 1999, RCTV purchased Digital Betacam cameras and decks, which allowed the use of cinematographic techniques in the illumination of outdoor shots. That same year, it was the first Venezuelan TV network to take part in the trials of digital television as the government originally planned to adopt the American ATSC standard.

On 15 November 1999, RCTV had been on the air for a total of 16,000 days.

=== 2000 to 2007 ===
In 2000, RCTV was the official Venezuelan broadcaster for the internationally televised special called 2000 Today, headed by the BBC of the UK. Also that year, RCTV was one of the first TV networks in Venezuela buying franchises such as game shows like the Venezuelan version of the original British game show Who Wants to Be a Millionaire?.

On 18 July 2005, the Centro Nacional de Noticias (National Center for News), was inaugurated. From here, RCTV broadcasts El Observador (all three daily emissions), La Entrevista, and other special programs of information and opinion. The president of Empresas 1BC and general director of RCTV, Marcel Granier, and the president of RCTV, Eladio Larez, were present at its inauguration. It is located in Quinta Crespo, a neighborhood in Caracas downtown where Radio Caracas Televisión's other studios can be found.

On 17 June 2006, the Autonomous Service of Intellectual Property (SAPI), issued an administrative resolution in which it cancelled the use of the trademark "Radio Caracas Televisión", arguing that RCTV has not used this name for at least three consecutive years (they preferred to identify themselves as just RCTV) and thus should no longer have the right to it. This resolution came about when RCTV was being sued by the cable channel, Caracas TV, for having trademarked the name Caracas TV three months after Caracas TV went on the air (RCTV was also known as Radio Caracas TV, and claimed that there was too much of a similarity). Caracas TV would later be relaunched as Canal de Noticias, a 24-hour cable news network.

On 15 December 2006, Tu Tienda RCTV, a gift shop which sells various products containing the logo of RCTV, ¿Quién Quiere Ser Millonario? (the local version of Who Wants to Be a Millionaire?), and the telenovela Te Tengo en Salsa, opened in the Recordland at the Sambil Mall in Caracas.

In 2006, RCTV was sued for broadcasting advertisements of phone services which used images with "high sexual content" during late night programming. The Supreme Court ordered the station to stop showing content of that type, and described the advertisements as morally hazardous content with persuasive messages.

== 2007 shutdown ==
RCTV Internacional's logo from 16 July 2007 to 24 January 2010

The Venezuelan government did not renew RCTV's broadcasting license which was up for renewal in May 2007 and the Venezuelan Supreme Court ordered their broadcast equipment to be temporarily seized and made available to the new government-owned TVes station, which commenced transmissions the next day after RCTV was shut down. RCTV has denied any wrongdoing and declared that no trial had been conducted that linked the network to the coup attempt. The seizure of all TV technology installations turned out to be a permanent confiscation.

The week after the closure, RCTV started broadcasting its newscast to Latin America, first through Colombia's Caracol Televisión and since then to other countries around the world. On 7 June, RCTV started broadcasting its newscast El Observador on Globovisión.

=== Background ===
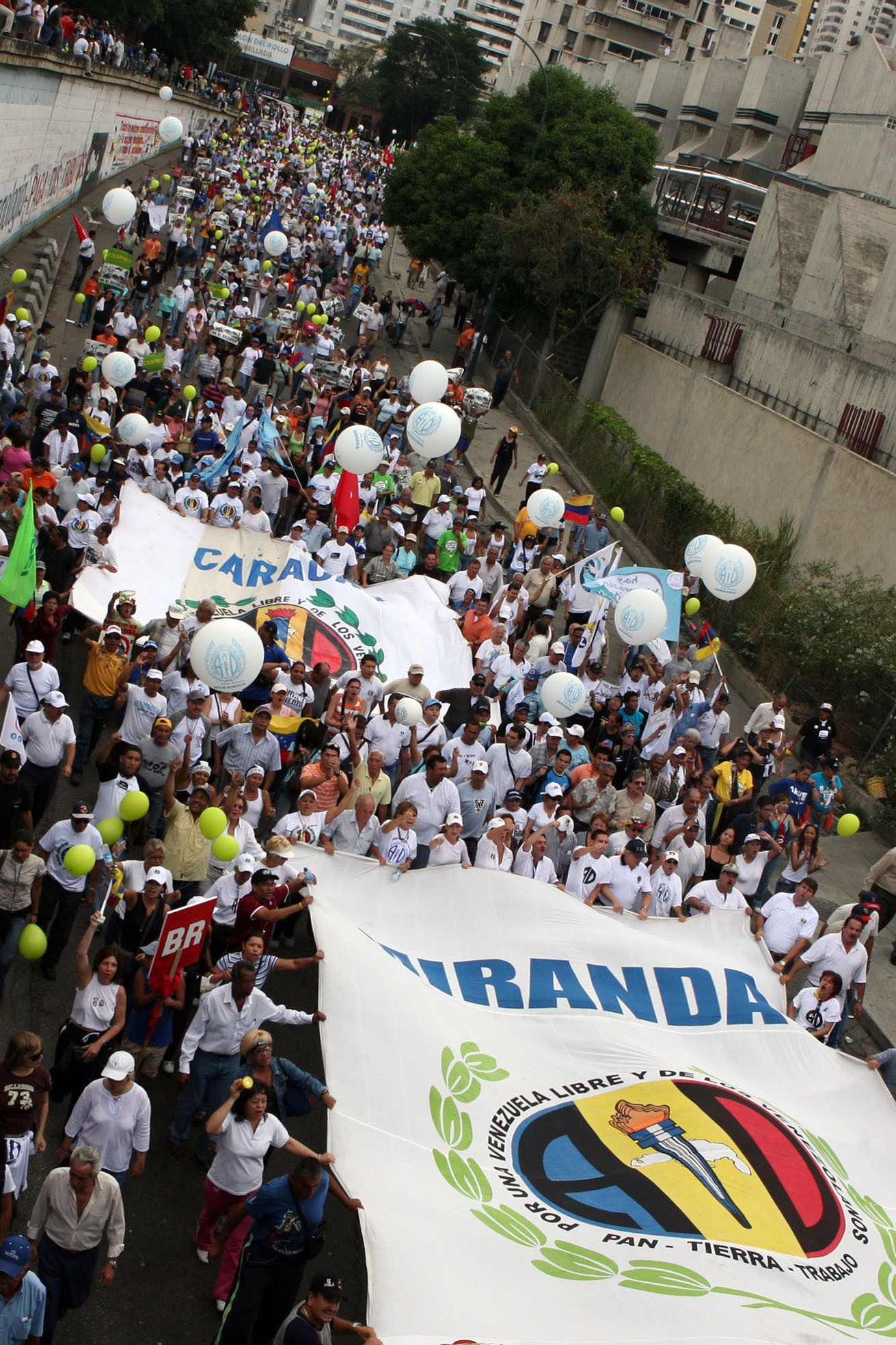
Venezuelans rally in support of RCTV

On 11 April 2002, supporters and opponents of Venezuelan President Hugo Chávez clashed near the Miraflores Palace, resulting in a shootout at the Llaguno Overpass between government supporters and the Metropolitan Police of Caracas. A sector of the Armed Forces asked for Chávez's resignation, holding him responsible for the ensuing massacre during the march. Commander of the Army Lucas Rincón Romero reported in a nationwide broadcast that Chávez had resigned his presidency, a charge Chávez would later deny. Chávez was taken to a military base while Fedecámaras president Pedro Carmona was appointed as the transitional President of Venezuela, following protests and a general strike by his opponents.

According to the St. Petersburg Times, RCTV excluded its news programs from its daily programming on 13 April 2002. Gustavo Cisneros, owner of Venevisión, stated that the alleged news blackout was a result of threats received from pro-Chávez demonstrators and callers who claimed to be members of the Chávez government. Protesters attacked RCTV's offices, smashing some windows and shouting: "The palace is in our hands, why aren't you showing that?".

Chávez was restored to power on 14 April 2002. Over the following months, and again in the wake of the 2002-2003 general strike, he stepped up his criticism of the country's private media companies, accusing them of having supported the coup. On his weekly television program Aló Presidente and in other forums, he regularly referred to the leading private media owners as "coup plotters", "fascists", and "the Four Horsemen of the Apocalypse".

=== End of concession ===
On 28 December 2006, President Chávez announced that the government would not renew RCTV's broadcast license which expired on 27 May 2007, thereby forcing the channel to cease broadcast operations on that day.

The Venezuelan Supreme Court of Justice (TSJ) ruled on 17 April 2007, that it is within the CONATEL's power to decide on the issuing, renewal and revocation of broadcast licenses. RCTV may continue broadcasting over cable or DTH systems (DirecTV Latin America) when its license expires, but the government will take over the equipment, studios and even the master control for their use in the new station it has created on 27 May 2007. On 24 May, the Supreme Court ordered RCTV to stop broadcasting as soon as its license expires and approved the government's takeover of its equipment, though it would review the station's appeal of the decision. Chávez announced plans to start broadcasting a public service channel, TVes, using this infrastructure which belonged to RCTV.

The Supreme Court ruled that RCTV's broadcasting equipment "must be available" to TVes. The ruling also ordered the military to guard the equipment. This allowed TVes to be available in the same locations where RCTV used to broadcast.

The final program airing on RCTV on Sunday was an all day/night retrospective tribute to the network, featuring current and ex workers, artists and staff of RCTV. This special was known as "Un Amigo Es Para Siempre". Many workers and artists from other networks, including Venevisión, had to use the last hours of RCTV to give their opinion since they were not allowed at their own companies.

On Saturday, 26 May, RCTV shut down its live Internet stream in preparation for its forced close-down on Sunday, 27 May. The only programmes broadcast on that day was Un Amigo Es Para Siempre, La Entrevista, and El Obserbador (Avance). At midnight on 28 May, RCTV ceased broadcasting and for the following 8 seconds, the signal went dark. Then, it was replaced by TVes ident which was on air for 20 minutes. At 12:20 a.m., TVes began programming for the first time.

=== RCTV interpretation ===
RCTV argues that no trial has been conducted that links the network to the coup attempt. Other stations—including Venevisión and Televen— were also accused of supporting the coup attempt, but their licenses were renewed. Those networks became less critical of Chávez, prompting opponents to say the action against RCTV was evidence that Chávez defined media outlets critical of his government as the enemy, according to the New York Times.

RCTV also argued that the channel's license would expire in 2022 rather than 2007. A 1987 decree during Jaime Lusinchi's presidential term gave RCTV a 20-year license, but the network claimed that the failure of the National Telecommunications Commission to issue an administrative authorization by 12 June 2002 automatically granted the channel a 20-year license renewal. The government rejected this interpretation, stating that the converting of licenses into administrative authorizations did not mean a license renewal, just a census of broadcasters. The Supreme Court subsequently agreed.

Chávez says TVes would better reflect his socialist revolution, calling RCTV "a threat to the country".

=== National reactions ===
Rallies took place, both in favor and against the government's decision. One rally against the decision took place in Caracas on 21 May 2007 with "thousands of protesters." On 25 May, university students from the Universidad Católica Andrés Bello, the Universidad Simón Bolívar and the Universidad Central de Venezuela protested against the government's intentions. On June 2, 2007, tens of thousands of pro-government protesters took to the streets in support of Chavez's decision.

Several opinion polls conducted by companies associated with the Venezuelan opposition showed that the public was strongly against the move. One poll, conducted in April 2007 by the Venezuelan company Datanálisis, found that 13% of the population agreed with the revocation of RCTV's license, while 70% rejected the government's decision. A May poll conducted by a firm called Hinterlaces in 15 Venezuelan states with a 4.7% margin of error reported that 83% of the Venezuelan population rejected the discontinuation of RCTV, with 74% saying that democracy was at stake.

=== International reactions ===
Many individuals, international organizations and NGOs—including the OAS's Secretary General José Miguel Insulza and its Special Rapporteur for Freedom of Expression, the Inter American Press Association, Human Rights Watch, the Committee to Protect Journalists, and the Human Rights Foundation—have expressed concerns for freedom of the press. United States Secretary of State Condoleezza Rice criticised the TV closure as "undemocratic" and went on to say "...disagreeing with your government is not unpatriotic and most certainly should not be a crime in any country, especially a democracy." However, Secretary Insulza also stated that it was up to the Venezuelan courts to solve this dispute and that he believed that this was an administrative decision.

The International Press Institute stated that it is "a flagrant attempt to silence the station's critical voice and in violation of everyone's right 'to seek, receive and impart information and ideas through any media and regardless of frontiers,' as outlined in Article 19 of the UN Universal Declaration of Human Rights." The Committee to Protect Journalists "concluded [Chávez's] government failed to conduct a fair and transparent review of RCTV's concession renewal. The report, based on a three-month investigation, found the government’s decision was a predetermined and politically motivated effort to silence critical coverage." Reporters Without Borders (RWB) stated "The closure of RCTV [...] is a serious violation of freedom of expression and a major setback to democracy and pluralism. President Chávez has silenced Venezuela’s most popular TV station and the only national station to criticize him, and he has violated all legal norms by seizing RCTV’s broadcast equipment for the new public TV station that is replacing it."

José Miguel Vivanco, Americas director for Human Rights Watch, called the RCTV case "clearly a case of censorship and the most grave step back in the region since Fujimori," referring to the manipulation of the media by Peruvian President Alberto Fujimori in the 1990s. "[Chávez] is misusing the state’s regulatory authority to punish a media outlet for its criticism of the government," Vivanco said.

The United States Senate approved a motion promoted by Senators Richard Lugar and Christopher Dodd condemning the closing, and Nancy Pelosi, Speaker of the United States House of Representatives, asserted that it was an attempt to silence the critics of the Government. The U.S. State Department, the European Union, the senates of Chile and Brazil, and the legislatures of a number of other Latin American countries also expressed concern over the incident.

European Commission President José Manuel Barroso qualified the measure as regrettable, adding that "freedom of expression and press freedom are substantial components of democracy. Costa Rican President Óscar Arias Sánchez stated that any media closing was a deathly strike against any democratic system. Chilean President Michelle Bachelet said she regrets the decision and that "freedom of expression is the golden rule." Along with her, Finnish President Tarja Halonen said she was watching the situation with concern. The Spanish Partido Popular, the main opposition party, called the closing an "attack against freedom of expression".

Some British politicians and journalists, in a letter to the editor to The Guardian, supported Chávez's decision to shutdown RCTV, due to their belief that the station had "used its access to the public airwaves to repeatedly call for the overthrow of the democratically elected government of President Hugo Chávez."

After the Brazilian Senate passed a motion urging Chávez to reconsider the shutdown of RCTV, Chávez "accused the Brazilian Congress of acting like a 'puppet' of the US", prompting Brazilian President Luiz Inácio Lula da Silva to say “Chavez has to take care of Venezuela, I have to take care of Brazil and (US President George W.) Bush has to take care of the US”. Later, Lula da Silva said the decision of the shutdown was internal Venezuelan affairs, adding that the legal logic of each country should be respected. Chávez said that presidents Daniel Ortega of Nicaragua and Evo Morales of Bolivia have phoned to show support to his decision and that Álvaro Uribe from Colombia said that his country would not involve itself in Venezuela's internal affairs. He also said "I would not do that to anybody." President Rafael Correa of Ecuador said that he would have canceled the broadcast license automatically after the 2002 coup.

With continued protests in 2010, the RCTV closure has been highlighted by human rights organization as an example of violations of freedom of the press, the absence of due process, and the Chavez administrations "abuse its authority to compel broadcast of presidential speeches that promote the government's political agenda" and Chavez seeking "to intimidate and punish broadcasters who criticize his government".

=== IACHR ===
In March 2009, the Inter-American Commission on Human Rights (IACHR) concluded two cases brought against Venezuela by the private Venezuelan TV stations Globovisión and RCTV. It concluded that the Venezuelan government had not violated the right to freedom of expression or equality before the law, but that the government had failed to do enough to prevent and punish acts of intimidation against journalists by third parties. On 7 September 2015, the IACHR again criticized the Venezuelan government for forcing RCTV off the air and ruled that concessions and assets taken from RCTV should be returned to the network.

=== Impact ===
According to one study, the closure of RCTV led to increased viewership on Globovision, "the only remaining television channel for opposition viewers." The study also found that approval ratings and voting for Chavez fell in places that had access to Globovision after RCTV's closure.

== 2007–2010: broadcasting on pay television ==
RCTV lost its terrestrial broadcast licence, but it was not out of business. In an article in the 5 July 2007 edition of AM New York, the head of RCTV, Marcel Granier said that he was considering taking the network's programming to subscription television. This was accomplished in the Summer of 2007.

In the wake of the loss of its terrestrial licence, RCTV announced plans to continue broadcasting its main news program El observador on popular internet video host YouTube during 2007. YouTube viewership of 'El Observador' was initially significant but within a week of the end of RCTV's television transmission had fallen to less than 5,000 viewers a day. El Observador stopped uploading videos to its YouTube channel after 13 July 2007, and instead directed its viewers to watch its broadcasts through a different video hosting service. Viewership numbers are not available.

On 7 July 2007, DirecTV Latin America and RCTV signed an agreement for the satellite service to air RCTV's programming to satellite subscribers in Venezuela and other parts of the world. The network would be available on DirecTV's channel 103, which on that day, showed a test signal with the RCTV logo. Later came the deals with other national providers, Inter, formerly known as Intercable, and Netuno, both being the most important and known cable operators in Venezuela. The channel number varies by area of the country and the cable system. Broadcasting officially resumed on 16 July at 6:00 a.m. (UTC−4).

In mid-2009, the Venezuelan media regulator CONATEL declared that cable broadcasters would be subject to the new media law if 70% or more of their content and operations were domestic. The decree went into effect on December 22, 2009. In January 2010 CONATEL concluded that RCTV met that criterion of broadcasting more than 70% domestic content in the past 90 days (being more than 90% domestic according to CONATEL), and reclassified it as a domestic media source, and therefore subject to the requirement of interrupting its regular programming with mandatory joint broadcasts, or national network. According to NGO Monitoreo Ciudadano, the government aired 141 national networks in 2009, with each having an average length of one hour. Along with several other cable providers, RCTV refused to air the joint broadcasts and was sanctioned with indefinite closure. According to the government, in order to resume broadcasting it will need to register as a domestic media provider. Other sanctioned channels include the American Network, América TV and TV Chile. TV Chile, an international channel of Chilean state television network TVN, had failed to respond to a January 14 deadline for clarifying the nature of its content.

RCTV later registered as a domestic media provider as ordered, and promised that it would follow the media law. However, its registration was rejected.

== 2010-2021 – Other media ==
After RCTV's registration as a domestic media provider was rejected, RCTV continued to produce live action shows for other companies. In 2012, RCTV co-produced La CQ, which was recorded at RCTV's studios, with Televisa and Cartoon Network Latin America, and La mujer de Judas, which was based on RCTV's telenovela of the same name, with TV Azteca. On December 10, 2014, Empresas 1BC announced that it would create a new division for TV program production and distribution called RCTV Producciones.

On September 7, 2015, the Inter-American Court of Human Rights ruled that the Venezuelan government must restore the concession for RCTV and for channel 2 in Caracas, noting that the refusal to renew the concession was an "indirect restriction on the exercise of freedom of expression [...] aimed at impeding the communication and circulation of ideas and opinions" and that the government violated the right to due process. The court also ordered a series of economic reparations to be paid by the state to RCTV and an open process to restore the concession to RCTV. Before the decision was handed, the network began its online blog in 2014 and within months began online broadcasting through the Internet, with a mix of program reruns and new programming.

On July 5, 2020, RCTV announced that its programming would return that same day as a streaming app. RCTV president Marcel Granier stated that the project was started because they knew the content produced by RCTV throughout its history had "outstanding" value, which let make over 22,000 hours of telenovelas, 13,000 hours of entertainment/variety programs and 7,000 hours of news/opinion programs available at launch, and they would continue adding new original content. It uses Streann Media's content streaming solution, and it's available on Android and iOS/iPadOS phones and tablets, Roku devices and desktop web browsers as a free service with no geoblocking.

On December 23, 2021, RCTV president Eladio Lárez announced that the company's programming content was available on the ad-supported Prende TV, Vix, Tubi and Canela TV streaming services. RCTV's own streaming service was shut down after the announcement.

== News and broadcasts ==
El Observador was RCTV's main newscast. It was broadcast three times a day, except for Sundays, when it only came on during important events such as elections.

Some of RCTV's programs could be seen in other countries on various channels, including TV Venezuela, a premium subscription channel available on DirecTV and their YouTube channel.

== See also ==
- List of telenovelas of Radio Caracas Televisión
- Media of Venezuela
- Censorship in Venezuela
- 2007 Venezuelan RCTV protests
