= Radio Caracas Radio =

Former radio station in Caracas

YVKS Radio Caracas Radio
- Caracas; Venezuela
- Broadcast area: Capital District (signal also reachable in nearby states)
- Frequency: 750 kHz AM
- Branding: RCR

Programming
- Format: All-news radio

Ownership
- Owner: Empresas 1BC

History
- First air date: 9 December 1930
- Last air date: 30 June 2023

Technical information
- Power: 100kW daytime 50kW nighttime

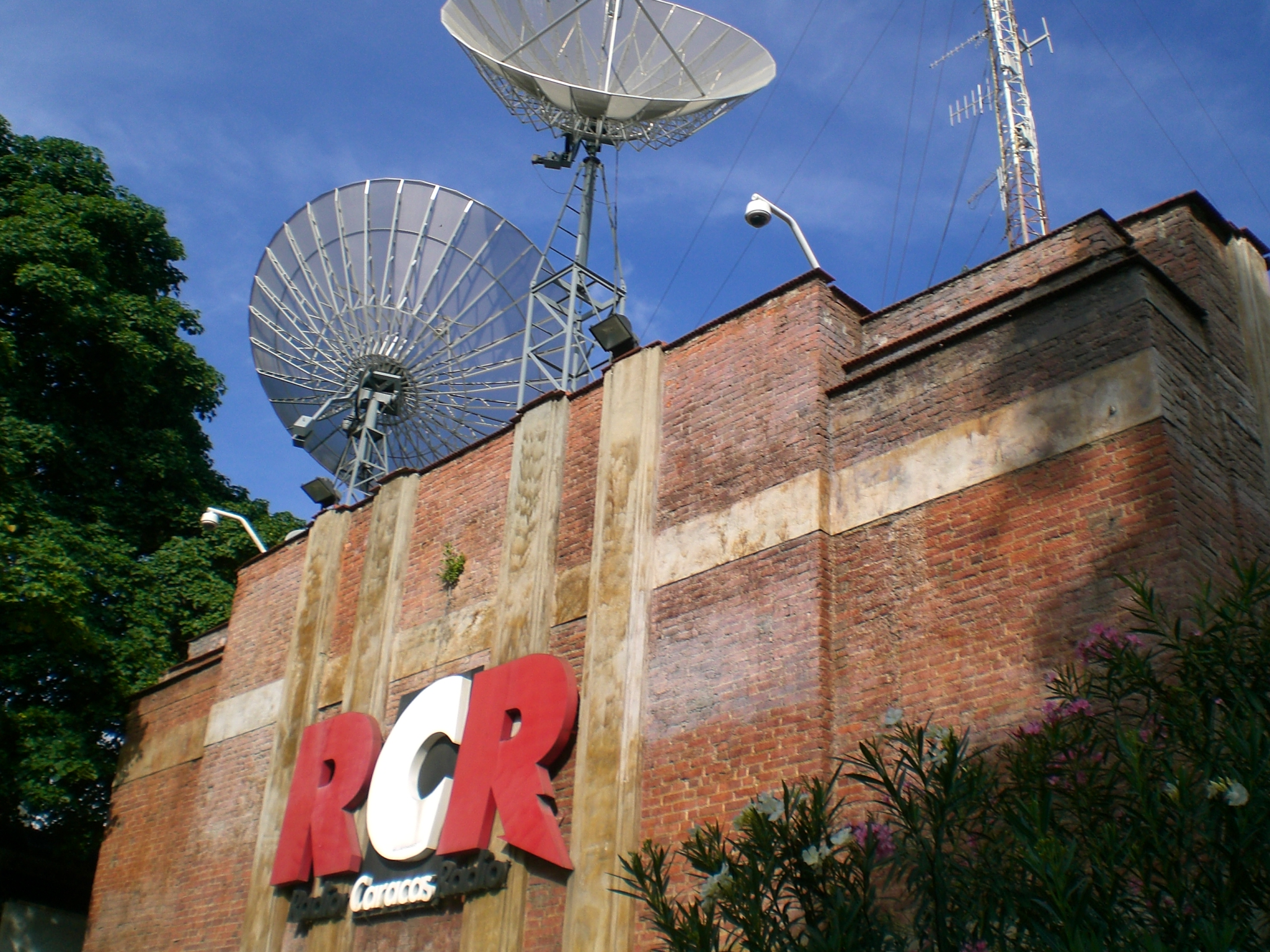
Headquarters of Radio Caracas Radio

Radio Caracas Radio was a Venezuelan radio station. Founded in 1930, it was Venezuela's oldest radio station. It was last owned by Empresas 1BC, a Venezuelan private media corporation. The station was shut down in 2023 by the Nicolás Maduro administration.

== History ==
=== Background ===
In 1930, Edgar J. Anzola, who was employed in an electronics business named Almacén Americano, brought to his employer, William Henry Phelps, his idea to mount a radio station in Caracas. Phelps already possessed the RCA Victor receptors, discs and equipment players, Underwood typewriters, Frigidaire refrigerators, Delco power plants, and Ford cars and trucks. Enthusiastic about Anzola's idea, Phelps installed a transmitter exclusively for commercial purposes. Ricardo Espina and technical manager Alberto López joined Phelps and Anzola in establishing a radio station.

=== Inauguration and early history ===
After hard work, everything was ready for Broadcasting Caracas, as the station was originally called, to go on the air. Careful tests were performed to make sure that all the equipment operated fully. Two of these tests had unique importance. One of them, which was held on 9 December 1930 and took place in the Plaza del Teatro Nacional during the dedication of the statue of Henry Clay, was the first remote transmission in Venezuela. That date marked the first broadcast of the new radio station which operated with a transmitter that had the capacity of 100 kilowatts. The next day, from the ballroom of the La Guaira Country Club, the performances of a band from the US Navy cruiser USS Northampton was aired in light of their visit to the port city. These broadcasts excited the residents of Caracas and increased the sales of radio appliances. The station began airing more commercial propaganda, which was the intention of its founders.

The official inauguration of Broadcasting Caracas took place on 11 December 1930, and everything was ready for its debut: the orchestras, broadcasters, singers, technicians, and even commercials, which were discreet and addressed in a well-kept language that corresponded to the station that would set the tone for future stations to be installed in the country. The first opening act was a concert by the station's orchestra conducted by Carlos Bonnet. The inauguration of Broadcasting Caracas made it the first permanent and first commercial radio station to begin operations in Venezuela (the first radio station to operate in Venezuela was AYRE, a government-owned station which began operations on 4 April 1926. AYRE ceased operations in 1928 due to political problems).

On 17 December 1930, from the state of Carabobo, Broadcasting Caracas made its second remote transmission during the inauguration of the monument commemorating the Battle of Carabobo.

On 22 March 1931, Broadcasting Caracas made its first sports broadcast, which was narrated by Esteban Ballesté Jr. from the Nuevo Circo de Caracas where the fight for the Welter title was taking place between Peter Martín and the North American Tommy White.

In the beginning, music was aired from 7:00 pm until closing at 10:00 pm, but transmission started at 6:00 pm with El Diario Hablado which was considered the first Venezuelan radio news broadcast. Also at that hour, the news of the Panorama Universal could be heard, whose slogan "say it on Panorama Universal and all of Venezuela will know" was a success. Months later, the station began broadcasting from the morning until eleven o'clock at night. In those day, it was customary to publish the programming schedule in the newspapers.

On 7 July 1932, the first radio news program was born: El Diario Hablado was broadcast twice daily. The first person in charge of that news program was Mario García Arocha, who was its columnist, narrator, and producer. Later, Alejandro Fuenmayor joined the program. In 1933, Francisco Fossa Andersen was put in charge of El Diario Hablado, where he remained for 15 years and created his own personal style in the narration of news.

YV1BC was the call sign of the station. YV, according to the international radio code, corresponds to Venezuela. The number 1 is the first licensed in the country and the following letters are the initials of the station.

Many programs marked the beginning of Broadcasting Caracas. They included La Hora de los Aficionados, which aired Tuesdays to Saturdays from 12:00 pm to 12:30 pm; La Radio Consulta with Francisco Fossa Andersen; Selecciones Deportivas; El Teatro de la Alegría, whose orchestra was conducted by Fortunato Barcarola; Horas del Municipal; La Familia Buchipluma; La Familia Santa Teresa; La Tremenda Jefatura, with Rafa Gonzalez Fina rojas among others great comedians and actors who began in Radio Caracas and later moved to the Radiodifusora Venezuela station; La Noche Joven; Conferencias Católicas; Sección Femenina; Pepe Alemán; Los Raslalantes Sanjuaneros; El Tío Nicolás; La Marcha del Tiempo and La Hora del Ministerio de Instrucción Pública, a program hosted by Guillermo Fernández de Arcila and Aracelis Cuervo Codazzi, professors at the Academy of Music and Declamation.

In the area of radionovelas, Broadcasting Caracas, a pioneer in the genre, broadcast works that made history and are still remembered by those who heard them. Among them included El Matrimonio Radiotrén, El Misterio de los Ojos Escarlatas, La Herencia del Conde Bermejas, El Tesoro de Sir Walter Raleigh, Los Experimentos del Dr. Hook, El Enigma de los Incas, El Alma del Tirano Aguirre, La Familia Santa Teresa, El Buque Fantasma, La Sayona, El Secreto de Ayarú, El Emir, and Cupertino y sus Maquinistas. It was in 1932 that Alfredo Cortina and Mario García Arocha wrote the very first radionovela: the comedy Santa Teresa, whose quality and humor kept it on the air for four years. The following year, El Misterio de los Ojos Escarlatas marked the beginning of the suspenseful radionovelas. A lot human imagination was put into the story that made history on Broadcasting Caracas in the 1930s. The plot caused so much excitement in the listeners that it was kept on the air for many months, and not only managed to entertain the audience, but described, in the development of each episode, several areas of the country during an era in which only a few people travelled. A star-studded cast protagonized the story written by Alfredo Cortina, most notably Edgar Anzola as Herr Mullernb and Indio Miguel; Margot Antillano as Eulalia; Cecilia Martínez as Alida Palmero; Luis Alfonso Larrain as Jaime, and Francisco Fossa Andersen as Dr. Aular. Also, Mario García Arocha was in charge of the narration. After this experience came El Misterio de las Tres Torres, a radionovela with a political touch written after the fall of the Gómez dictatorship. It contained reflexions on life in the Tres Torres prison of Barquisimeto. It starred Antonio José Marcano and Alejandro Arratia Oses and was written by Tulio Flores and Pablo Sosa Guzmán, among others. In 1945, Radio Caracas, with Tomás Henríquez in charge of the department of radionovelas, included this genre in its programming. Titles such as Las Sombras del Otro and Tú también eres mi Hija, caused a big impact on its listeners. Finally, another well-remembered radionovela transmitted by Radio Caracas was Cuatro Horas antes de Morir with Tomás Henríquez. The voices of this production were Carmencita Serrano and the famous actor-narrator Pancho Pepe Cróquer.

Besides, the legendary bolero singer Graciela Naranjo made her professional debut on Broadcasting Caracas at the age of 15.

In 1935, following the death of General Juan Vicente Gómez on 17 December, Broadcasting Caracas changed its name to Radio Caracas.

In 1942, Radio Caracas launched El Reporter Esso presented by the Creole Petroleum Corporation (a subsidiary of Standard Oil of New Jersey). In its first years was written by the United Press news agency via teletype. This famous news segment gave the rise to big voices such as Amable Espina, Francisco Amado Pernía, Marco Antonio Lacavalerie, and Carlos Quintana Negrón, among others.

In 1945, Renny Ottolina began his career on Radio Caracas as a news narrator. The following year, Alfredo Sadel debuted on Radio Caracas, in which he recorded his first song, Desesperanza in 1946. Unfortunately, Desesperanza never went on the air, but Sadel would go on to host popular radio shows such as Caravana Camel, an evening radio program where he made his claim to fame. Other artists, musicians, and personalities that made their debut on Radio Caracas included Eduardo Serrano (as an orchestra director), Fedora Alemán, Ángel Sauce, Pedro Antonio Ríos Reyna, Antonio Estévez, and Amador Bendayán, to name a few.

Radio Caracas has been colloquially known as "the university of radio" in Venezuela because of successful narrators starting their careers there. Notable on-air talent has included Edgar J. Anzola, Ricardo Espina, Francisco Fossa Andersen, Mario García Arocha, Esteban Ballesté, Oscar Eduardo Rickel, Justo Piñero Rojas, Luis Brito Arocha, Billo Frómeta, Rafael Guillermo Zamora, Renny Ottolina, Angel Edmundo Brice, Alberto Oyarzábal, Alcides Toro, Alcides Delgado, Rene Estevez, Enrique Vera Fortique, Antonio Castes, Víctor Saume, Amable Espina, León Bravo, Cecilia Martinez, José Matías Rojas, Enrique Ascanio Buróz, Julian Mariño Jimenez, Domingo Hurtado, Juan Francisco Rodríguez, Félix Cardona Moreno, Ulises Acosta, Henry Altuve, Leandro Azuaje, Francisco Amado Pernía, Héctor Mayerston, Jesús Maella, Ernesto D' Escrivan, Alberto Blanco Uribe, and Eduardo Martínez Plaza,

In the 1940s, the program Anuncios Féminas, hosted by María Teresa Castillo and Anita Massanett, was created, and was considered the first feminist program on Venezuelan radio. It was a program dedicated to the orientation and general education of ladies which later moved to Radio Continente.

A famous journalist claims that the overthrow of General Isaías Medina Angarita was consolidated when one of the leaders of the civil-military coup of 18 October 1945 spoke on Radio Caracas and made a call to the public to incorporate into the "revolution".

=== Format changes & recent history ===
After the inauguration of Radio Caracas Televisiόn on 15 November 1953, Radio Caracas became known as Radio Caracas Radio in order to avoid confusion with its television counterpart.

With the arrival of Peter Bottome as director in 1959, things began to change. The style of the narrators were modified. North American music became a fashion and the transmission of radionovelas, horse races, and other sports were eliminated.

Due to the high listenership from people in their automobiles, Radio Caracas Radio, on 16 November 1969, began airing traffic reports made from the "Tango Tango Fox" airplane. In the beginning, the traffic reports were conducted by Alfredo José Mena and Efraín de la Cerda. Both these men hold the merit of being the first traffic reporters in Venezuela and having created a very peculiar narration style.

The 1970s gave rise to new programs on Radio Caracas Radio: Venezuela Canta Así, hosted by Jorge Galvis; Por el Mundo de la Música, a program dedicated to the broadcast of classical music which was hosted by professor José Antonio Calcaño and aired between 1975 and 1978, a date in which the famous Venezuelan musicologist died; Venezuela en los 750, produced and narrated by William Guzmán; La Gran Consulta Popular, a program produced and hosted by Miguel Toro in which the general public could interrogate the invited guests through telephone calls.

In 1992, Radio Caracas Radio abandoned music and converted into the first radio station dedicated night and day to news.

On 13 May 2003, Roberto Giusti, host of the program Golpe a Golpe, filed a complaint with the Public Prosecutor's Office denouncing the death threats he had been receiving. On 2 May, a group of about ten people entered the studios of Radio Caracas Radio and began shouting offensive slogans at the journalist and calling him a "murderer". The attackers sprayed graffiti on the building's walls and Giusti's car. Giusti called for an investigation into the incident and possible links to his reports on the presence of Colombian guerrillas in Venezuela.

On 28 June 2005, Expediente, conducted by Francisco Olivares, won the 2005 Monseñor Pellín Award for best national radio program.

After Radio Caracas Televisiόn was taken off the air at 11:59 pm on 27 May 2007, due to the government of Hugo Chávez's decision not to renew its broadcast license, Radio Caracas Radio began transmitting El Observador, the newscast of Radio Caracas Televisiόn. It is the flagship radio newscast of RCR today. As of July 2019, the RCR 750 transmitter is currently off air.

== See also ==
- Radio Caracas Televisión
- List of radio stations in Venezuela
