= 2010 =

2010 in various calendars
- Gregorian calendar: 2010; MMX
- Ab urbe condita: 2763
- Armenian calendar: 1459; ԹՎ ՌՆԾԹ
- Assyrian calendar: 6760
- Baháʼí calendar: 166–167
- Balinese saka calendar: 1931–1932
- Bengali calendar: 1416–1417
- Berber calendar: 2960
- British Regnal year: 58 Eliz. 2 – 59 Eliz. 2
- Buddhist calendar: 2554
- Burmese calendar: 1372
- Byzantine calendar: 7518–7519
- Chinese calendar: 己丑年 (Earth Ox); 4707 or 4500 — to — 庚寅年 (Metal Tiger); 4708 or 4501
- Coptic calendar: 1726–1727
- Discordian calendar: 3176
- Ethiopian calendar: 2002–2003
- Hebrew calendar: 5770–5771
- Hindu calendars
- Vikram Samvat: 2066–2067
- Shaka Samvat: 1931–1932
- Kali Yuga: 5110–5111
- Holocene calendar: 12010
- Igbo calendar: 1010–1011
- Iranian calendar: 1388–1389
- Islamic calendar: 1431–1432
- Japanese calendar: Heisei 22 (平成２２年)
- Javanese calendar: 1942–1943
- Juche calendar: 99
- Julian calendar: Gregorian minus 13 days
- Korean calendar: 4343
- Minguo calendar: ROC 99 民國99年
- Nanakshahi calendar: 542
- Thai solar calendar: 2553
- Tibetan calendar: ས་མོ་གླང་ལོ་ (female Earth-Ox); 2136 or 1755 or 983 — to — ལྕགས་ཕོ་སྟག་ལོ་ (male Iron-Tiger); 2137 or 1756 or 984
- Unix time: 1262304000 – 1293839999

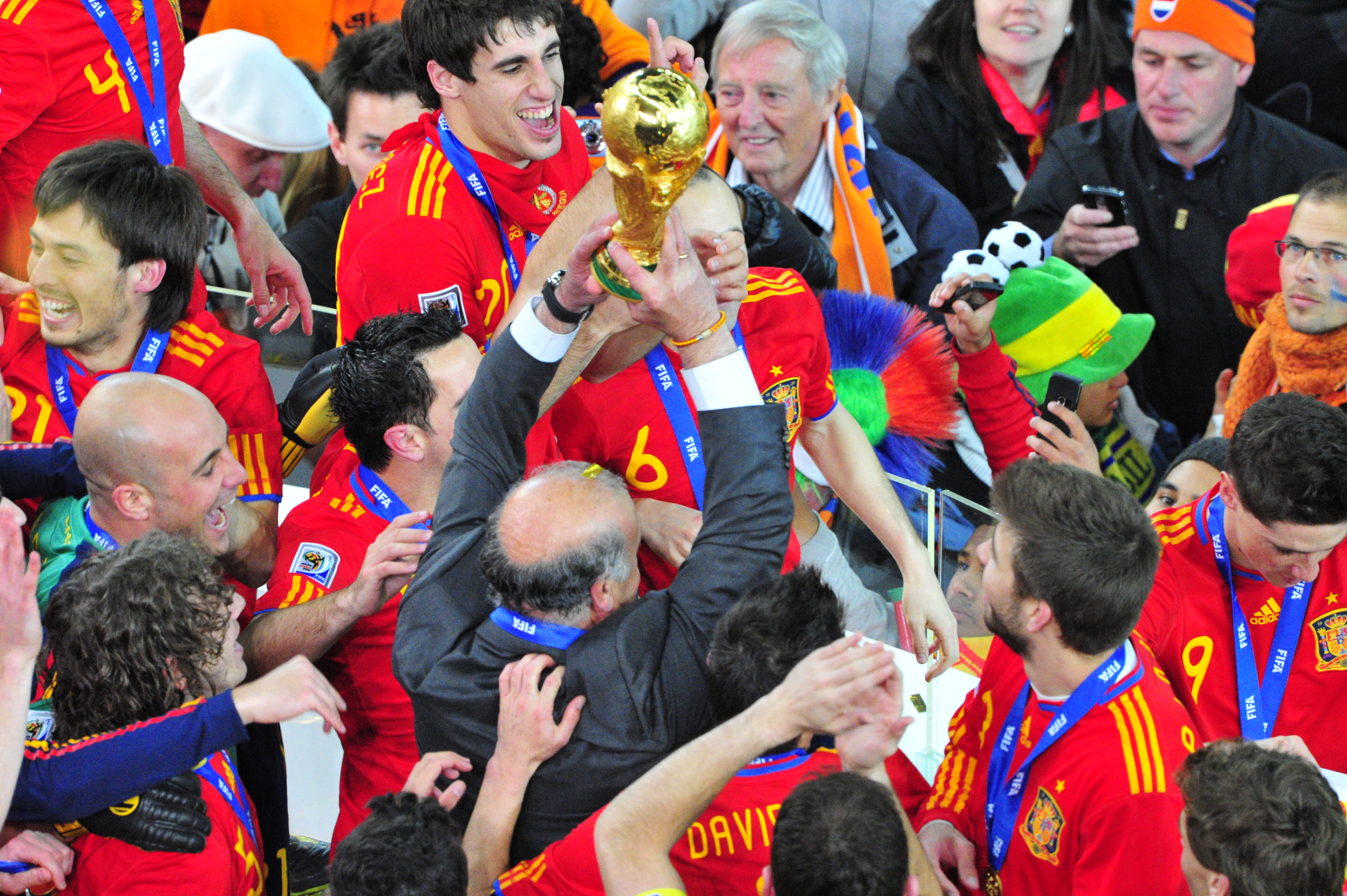
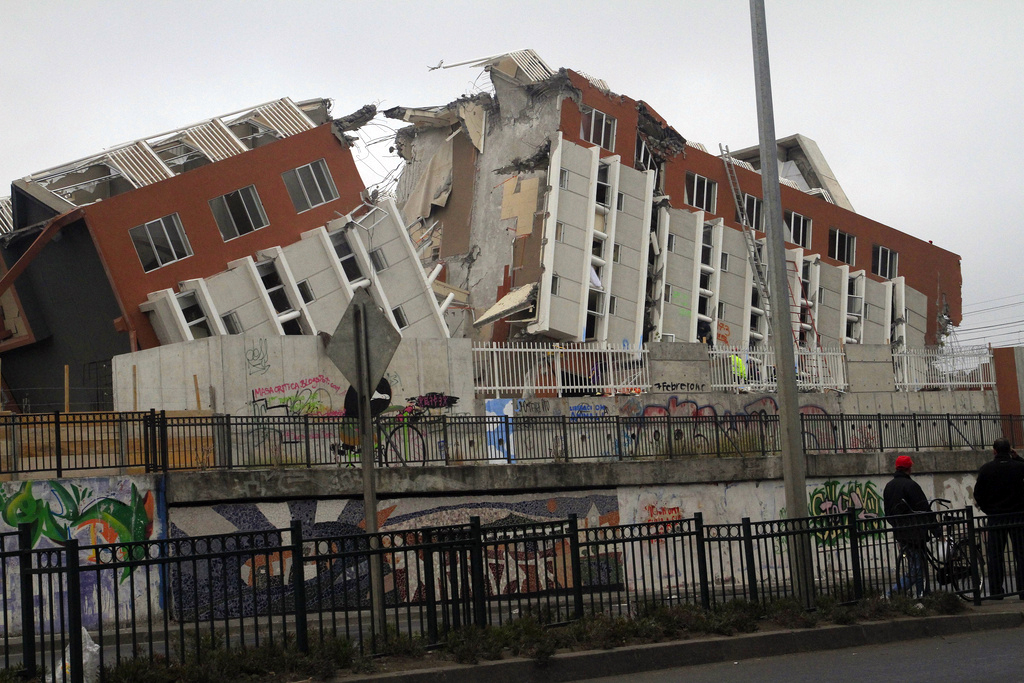
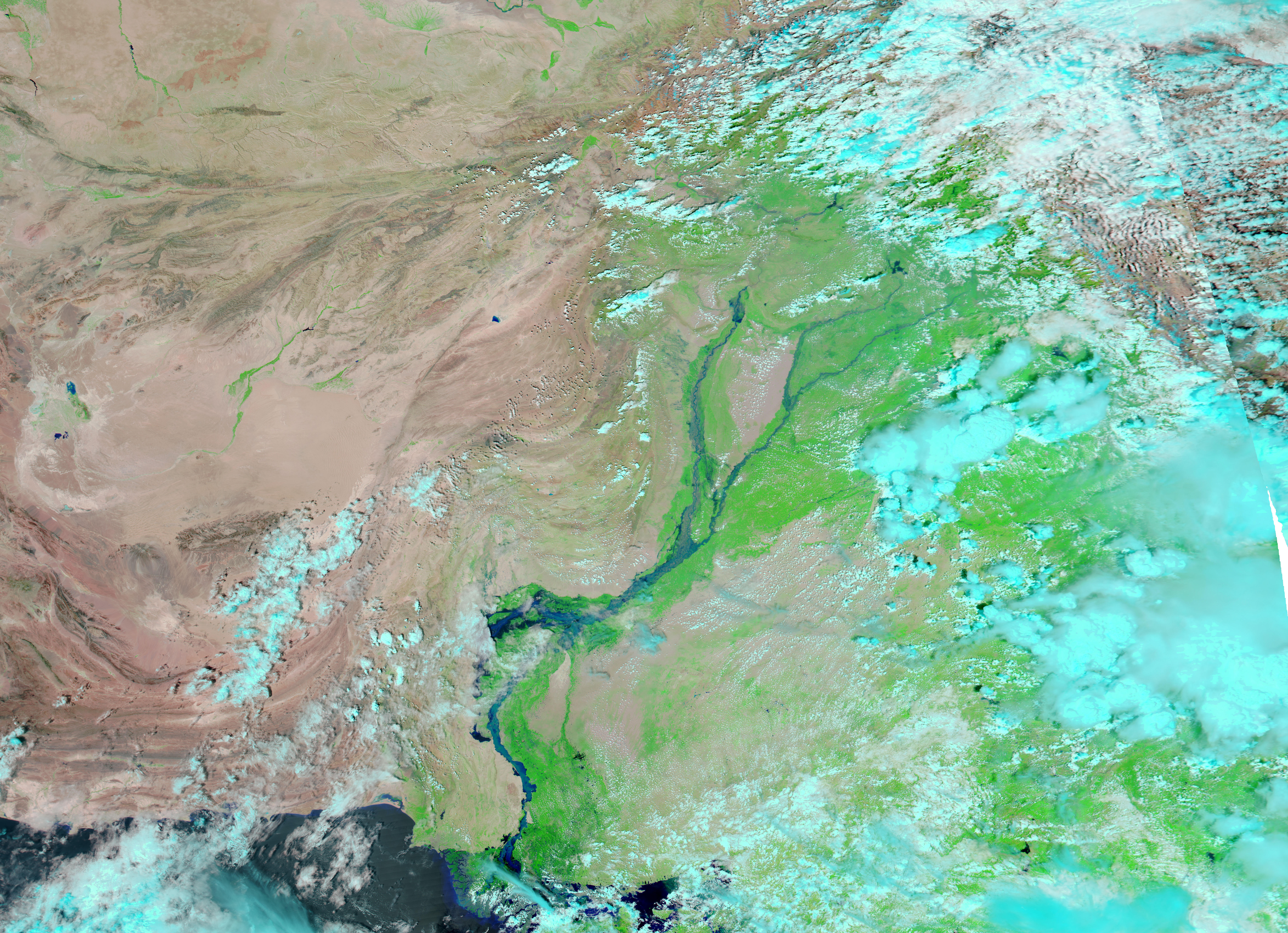
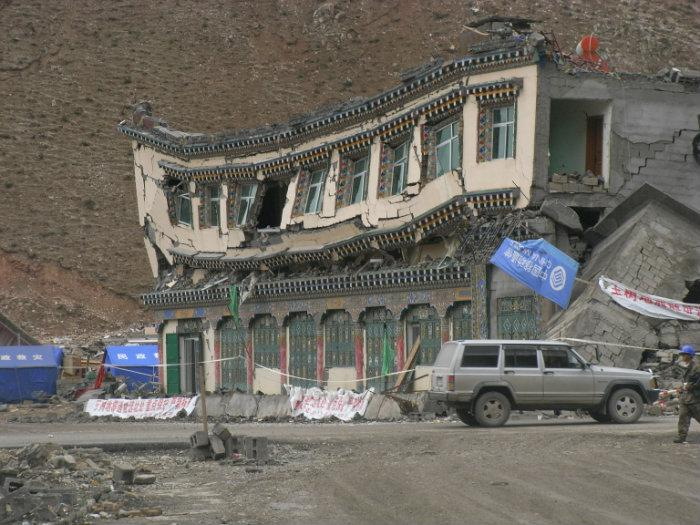
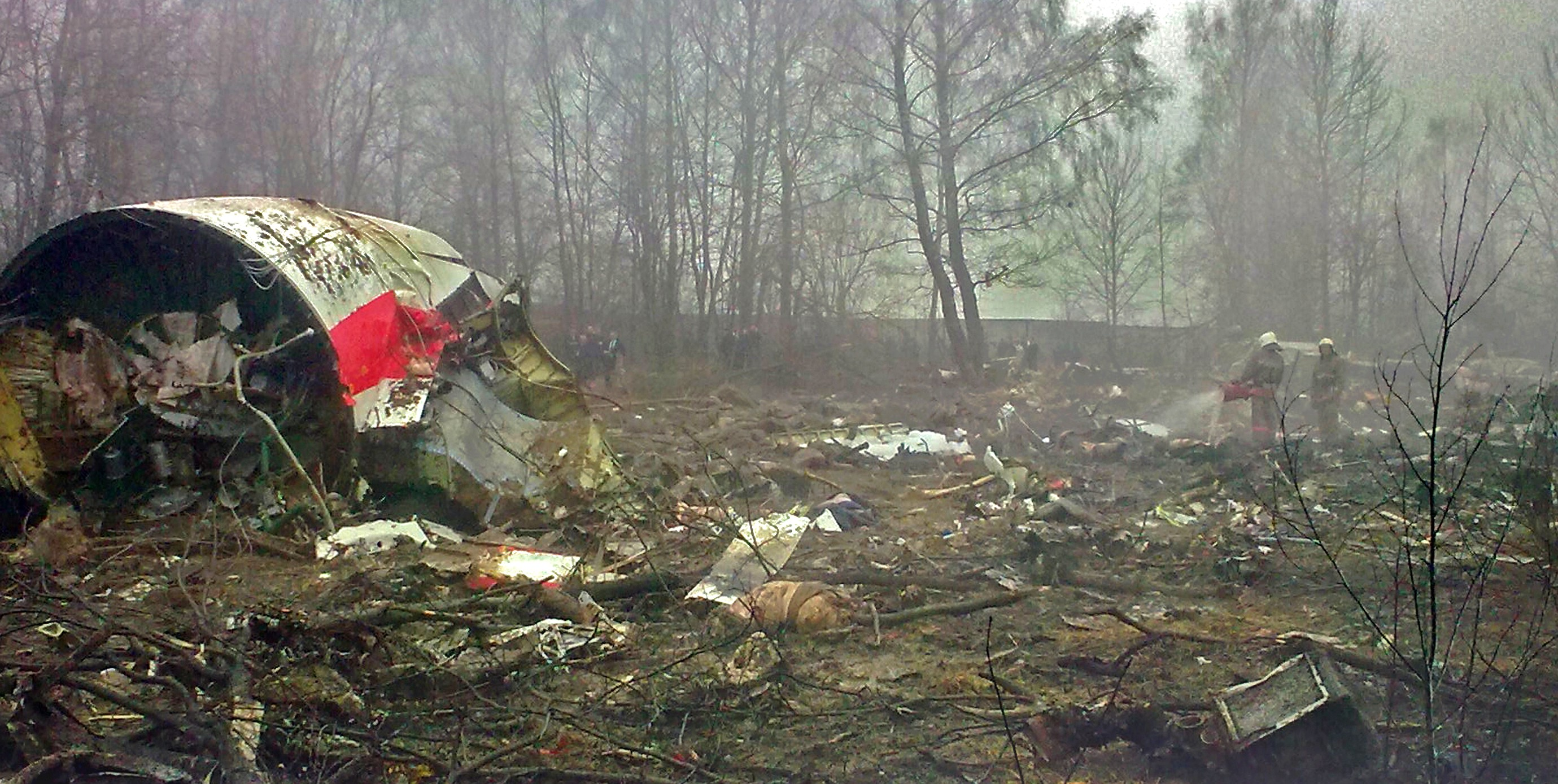
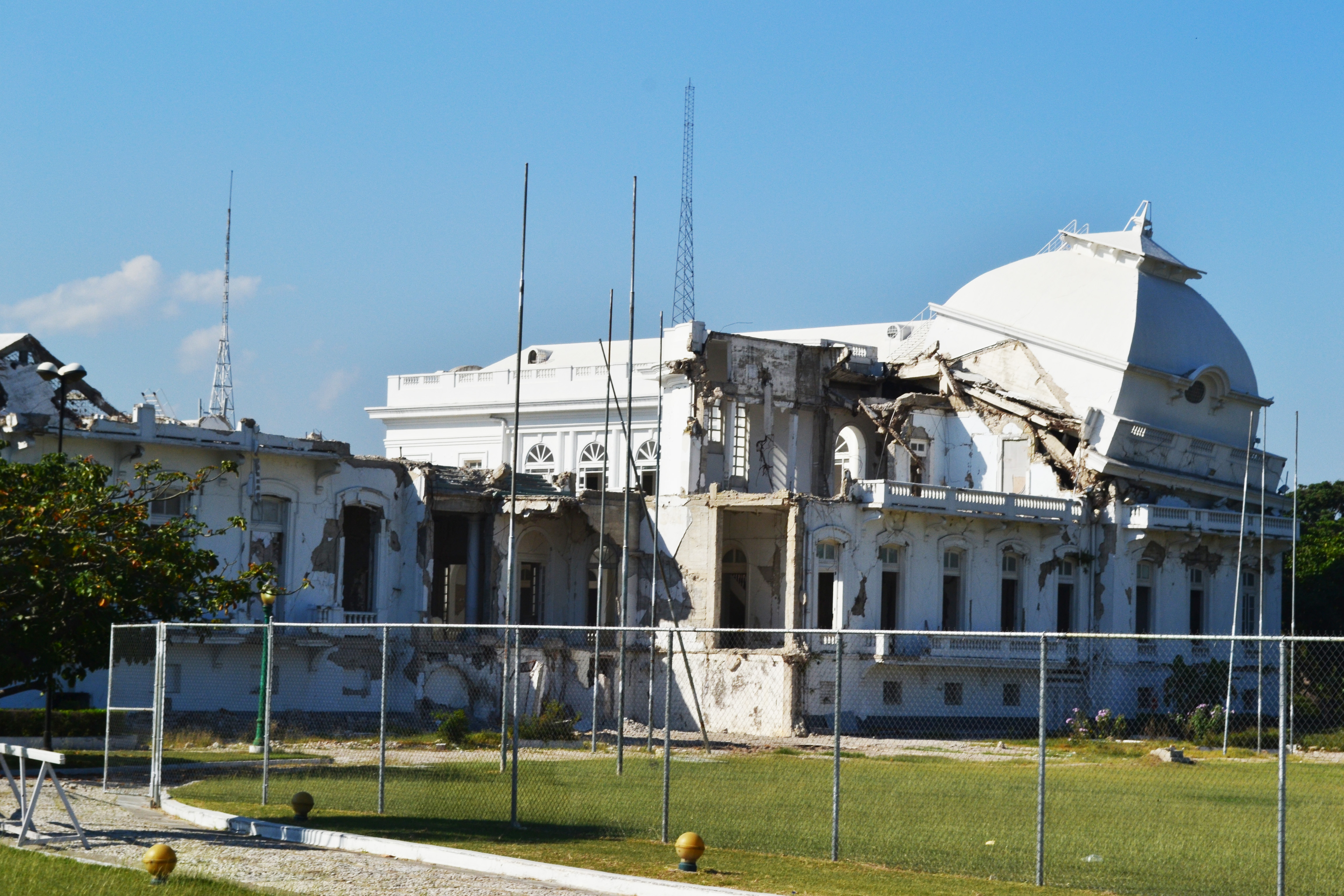
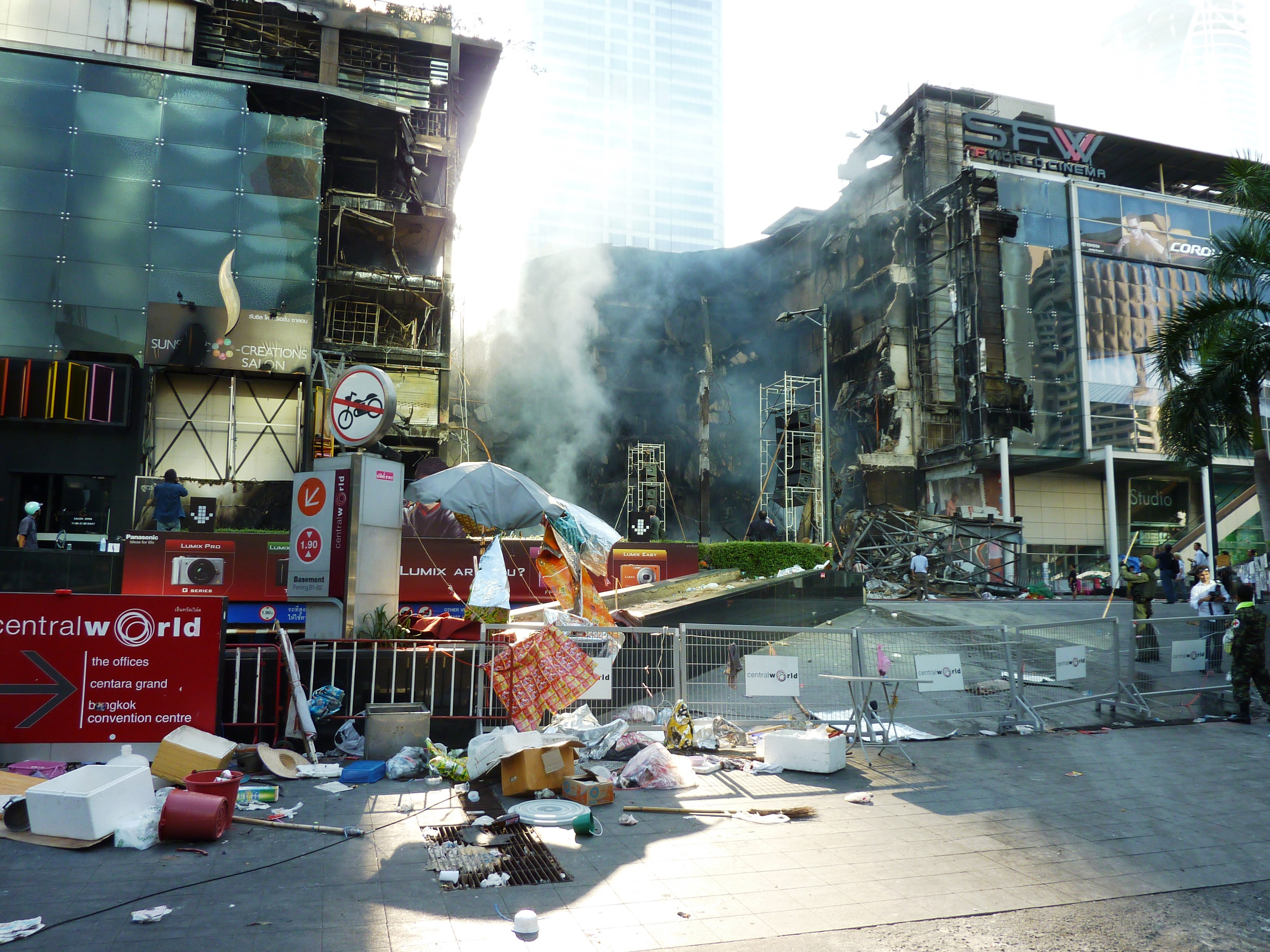
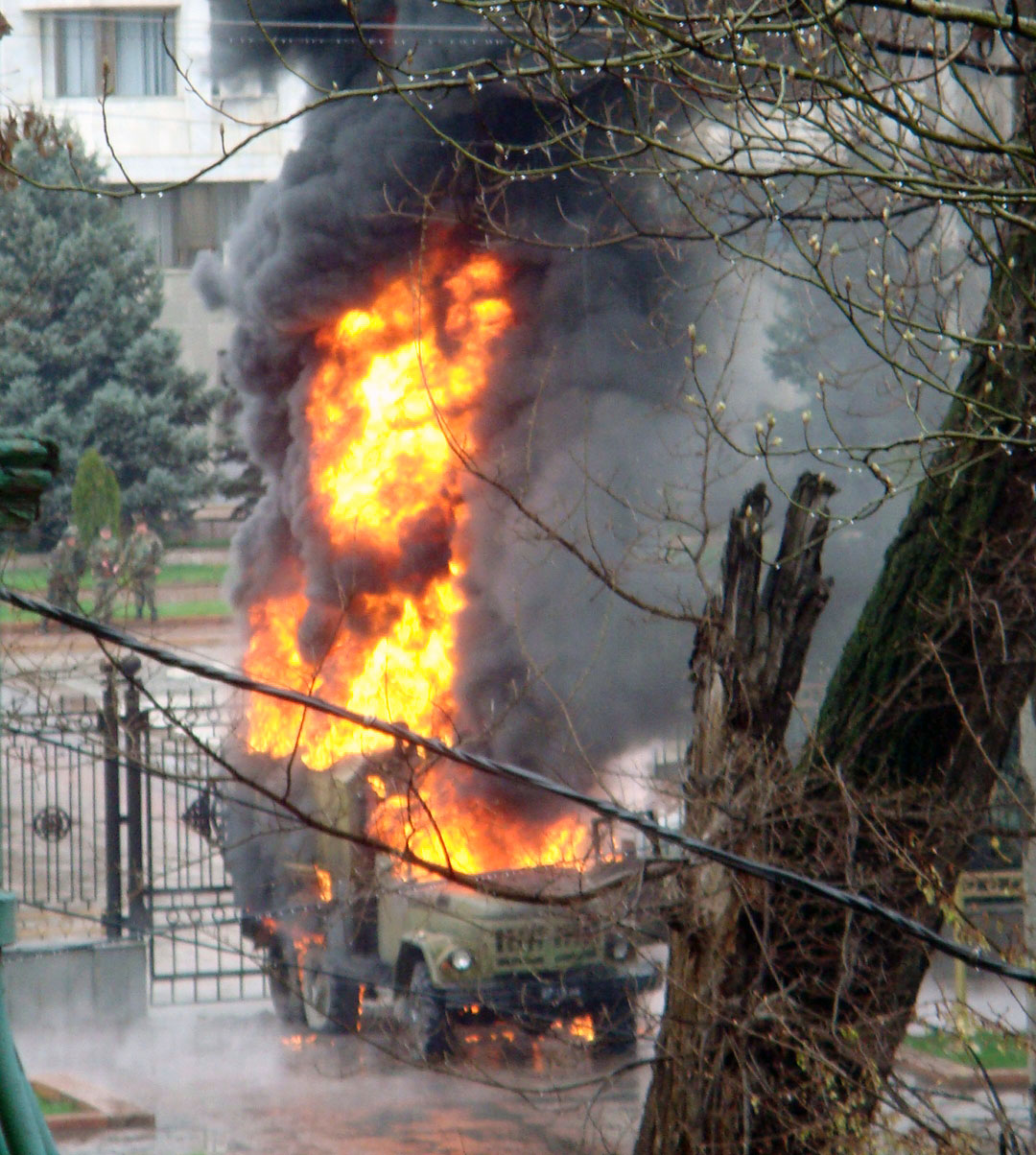
From left to right, top to bottom:
- The 2010 FIFA World Cup was held in South Africa and was won by Spain;
- The social media giant Instagram was launched; an image shows a phone with many social media apps, as social media became more popular over the decade;
- An 8.8 magnitude earthquake in Chile killed 525 and was an 8.8 on the scale, becoming one of the strongest earthquakes ever recorded;
- The 2010 Pakistan floods are one of the deadliest floods in Pakistan, with 2,000 fatalities;
- An earthquake in Yushu killed 2,700;
- An airplane carrying 96 politicians crashes near Smolensk, Russia. The plane was en route to a ceremony commemorating the 70th anniversary of the Katyn massacre, which killed 22,000 in 1940. All 96 individuals, including the president of Poland Lech Kaczyński were killed in the crash
- A 7.0 magnitude earthquake near Port-au-Prince killed as many as 316,000, making it one of the deadliest natural disasters in history; it also led to the collapse of the National Palace of Haiti;
- The Thai political protests were a series of political protests that were organised by the United Front for Democracy Against Dictatorship in Bangkok, Thailand
- The 2010 Kyrgyz revolution, also known as the Second Kyrgyz Revolution or the People's April Revolution, resulted in the ousting of President Kurmanbek Bakiyev.

2010 (MMX) was a common year starting on Friday of the Gregorian calendar, the 2010th year of the Common Era (CE) and Anno Domini (AD) designations, the 10th year of the 3rd millennium and the 21st century, and the 1st year of the 2010s decade.

The year saw a multitude of natural and environmental disasters such as the 2010 Haiti earthquake, the Deepwater Horizon oil spill, and the 2010 Chile earthquake. The swine flu pandemic which began the previous year dissipated in this year. In addition, the Organisation for Economic Co-operation and Development (OECD) gained four new members: Chile, Slovenia, Israel, and Estonia. 2010 also saw advancements in technology such as the release of the iPad, the public launch of Instagram, and the first successful trapping of antimatter.

2010 was designated as:

- International Year of Biodiversity
- International Year of Youth
- 2010 European Year for Combating Poverty and Social Exclusion
- International Year for the Rapprochement of Cultures

== Pronunciation ==
There is a debate among experts and the general public on how to pronounce specific years of the 21st century in English. The year 2010 is pronounced either "twenty-ten" or "two thousand (and) ten". 2010 was the first year to have a wide variation in pronunciation, because the years 2000 to 2009 were generally pronounced "two thousand (and) one, two, three, etc." as opposed to the less common "twenty-oh-_".

== Events ==
=== January ===
- January 4 – The tallest man-made structure to date, the Burj Khalifa in Dubai, United Arab Emirates, is officially opened.
- January 8 – The Togo national football team is attacked in Cabinda Province, Angola, and as a result withdraws from the Africa Cup of Nations. The attack was perpetrated by the FLEC, their first since the Angolan Civil War.
- January 10 – Religious violence erupts in Jos, Nigeria, which left scores dead, and many injured.
- January 12 – A 7.0-magnitude earthquake occurs in Haiti, devastating the nation's capital, Port-au-Prince.
- January 14 – Yemen declares an open war against the terrorist group al-Qaeda.
- January 15
  - The longest annular solar eclipse of the 3rd millennium occurs.
  - The Chadian Civil War officially ends.
  - Honduras withdraws from ALBA.
- January 19
  - Mahmoud Al-Mabhouh is assassinated in Dubai.
  - North Caucasian Federal District was split from Southern Federal District by decree of Russian president Dmitry Medvedev.
- January 25 – Ethiopian Airlines Flight 409 crashes into the Mediterranean shortly after take-off from Beirut–Rafic Hariri International Airport, killing all 90 people on board.

=== February ===
- February 3 – The sculpture L'Homme qui marche I by Alberto Giacometti sells in London for £65 million (US$103.7 million), setting a new world record for a work of art sold at auction.
- February 10 – The Australian government is hit by cyberattacks from freedom of expression activists, following recent Australian pornography restrictions.
- February 12–28 – The 2010 Winter Olympics are held in Vancouver and Whistler, Canada.
- February 15 – Two trains collide in Halle, Belgium, killing 19 and injuring 171 people.
- February 18 – The president of Niger, Mamadou Tandja, is overthrown after a group of soldiers storms the presidential palace and form a ruling junta, the Supreme Council for the Restoration of Democracy headed by chef d'escadron Salou Djibo.
- February 27 – An 8.8-magnitude earthquake occurs in Chile, triggering a tsunami over the Pacific and killing at least 525. The earthquake is one of the largest in recorded history.

=== March ===
- March 14 – Pokémon HeartGold and SoulSilver Versions were released in North America. These are the highest rated games to date, with a user score of 9.1/10 on Metacritic, indicating "universal acclaim," and a critic score of 87.
- March 16 – The Kasubi Tombs, Uganda's only cultural World Heritage Site, are destroyed by fire.
- March 22 – Four-year-old Paulette Gebara Farah disappears from her family's home located in Huixquilucan, State of Mexico.
- March 26 – The ROKS Cheonan, a South Korean Navy ship carrying 104 personnel, sinks off the country's west coast, killing 46. In May, an independent investigation blames North Korea, which denies the allegations.

=== April ===
- April 3 – The first iPad is released.
- April 5 – Julian Assange leaks footage of a 2007 airstrike in Iraq titled "Collateral Murder" on the website WikiLeaks.
- April 7 – Kyrgyz President Kurmanbek Bakiyev flees the country amid fierce anti-government riots in the capital, Bishkek.
- April 10 – The president of Poland, Lech Kaczyński, is among 96 killed when their airplane crashes near Smolensk, Russia.
- April 14 – Volcanic ash from one of several eruptions beneath Mount Eyjafjallajökull, an ice cap in Iceland, begins to disrupt air traffic across northern and western Europe.
- April 20 – The Deepwater Horizon oil drilling platform explodes in the Gulf of Mexico, killing 11 workers. The resulting Horizon oil spill, one of the largest in history, spreads for several months, damaging the waters and the United States coastline, and prompting international debate and doubt about the practice and procedures of offshore drilling.
- April 25 – In the second round of the 2010 Hungarian parliamentary election the alliance of Fidesz led by Viktor Orbán and the Christian Democratic People's Party (KDNP) wins enough seats to achieve a two-thirds supermajority in the legislature, beginning the 16-year second premiership of Viktor Orbán during which the country enters a period of democratic backsliding.
- April 27 – Standard & Poor's downgrades Greece's sovereign credit rating to junk 4 days after the activation of a €45-billion EU–IMF bailout, triggering the decline of stock markets worldwide and of the euro's value, and furthering a European sovereign debt crisis.

=== May ===
- May 1 – Expo 2010 is held in Shanghai, China.
- May 2 – The eurozone and the International Monetary Fund agree to a €110 billion bailout package for Greece. The package involves sharp Greek austerity measures.
- May 4 – Nude, Green Leaves and Bust by Pablo Picasso sells in New York for US$106.5 million, setting another new world record for a work of art sold at auction.
- May 6
  - The 2010 United Kingdom general election results in a hung parliament, with the Conservative Party twenty seats short of a majority.
  - The 2010 flash crash, a trillion-dollar stock market crash, occurs over 36 minutes, initiated by a series of automated trading programs in a feedback loop.
- May 7
  - Chile becomes the 31st member of the OECD.
  - Scientists conducting the Neanderthal genome project announce that they have sequenced enough of the Neanderthal genome to suggest that Neanderthals and humans may have interbred.
- May 10 – The 2010 Philippine presidential election is held, with Benigno Aquino III elected as Philippine President.
- May 12
  - Following the 6 May United Kingdom general election, the Conservative and Liberal Democrat parties agree to form a coalition government, the UK's first since the Second World War.
  - Afriqiyah Airways Flight 771 crashes at runway at Tripoli International Airport in Libya, killing 103 of the 104 people on board.
- May 19 – Protests in Bangkok, Thailand, end with a bloody military crackdown, killing 91 and injuring more than 2,100.
- May 20
  - Scientists announced that they have created a functional synthetic genome.
  - Five paintings worth €100 million are stolen from the Musée d'Art Moderne de la Ville de Paris.
- May 22
  - Air India Express Flight 812 overshoots the runway at Mangalore International Airport in India, killing 158 and leaving 8 survivors.
  - Inter Milan beats Bayern München 2–0 in the 2010 Champions League Final at the Santiago Bernabéu.
- May 25–29 – The Eurovision Song Contest 2010 takes place in Oslo, Norway, and is won by German entrant Lena with the song "Satellite".
- May 28 – the 2010 Ahmadiyya mosques massacre in Lahore, Punjab, Pakistan, killed 94 people during Friday prayers at two mosques.
- May 31 – Nine activists are killed in a clash with soldiers when Israeli Navy forces raid and capture a flotilla of ships attempting to break the Gaza blockade.

=== June ===
- June 9 – The Chicago Blackhawks win their first Stanley Cup since 1961.
- June 10–14 – Ethnic riots in Kyrgyzstan between Kyrgyz and Uzbeks result in the deaths of hundreds.
- June 11–July 11 – The 2010 FIFA World Cup was held in South Africa and was won by Spain.
- June 19 – Wedding of Victoria, Crown Princess of Sweden, and Daniel Westling
- June 22–25 – A tennis match between Nicolas Mahut and John Isner at the Wimbledon Championships, becomes the longest tennis match in history.
- June 24 –
  - Julia Gillard is elected unopposed in a Labor Party leadership ballot and sworn in as the first female prime minister of Australia following the resignation of Kevin Rudd.
  - FIA appointed Pirelli as official tyre partner and supplier for Formula One from 2011 season onwards.

=== July ===
- July 8 – The first 24-hour flight by a solar-powered plane is completed by the Solar Impulse.
- July 13 – Microsoft ends extended support for Windows 2000.
- July 16 – First (test) Instagram posts made by co-developers Mike Krieger and Kevin Systrom in San Francisco; the service launches publicly on October 6.
- July 21 – Slovenia becomes the 32nd member of the OECD.
- July 25 – WikiLeaks, an online publisher of anonymous, covert, and classified material, leaks to the public over 90,000 internal reports about the United States-led involvement in the War in Afghanistan from 2004 to 2010.
- July 28 – Airblue Flight 202 crashes near Islamabad, Pakistan, killing all 152 people on board.
- July 29 – Heavy monsoon rains begin to cause widespread flooding in the Khyber Pakhtunkhwa province of Pakistan. Over 1,600 are killed, and more than one million are displaced by the floods.
- PDVAL affair, also known as the Pudreval affair, political scandal in Venezuela where tons of rotten food supplies were found torrent, which imported during Hugo Chávez's government through subsidies of state-owned enterprise PDVAL.

=== August ===
- August 10 – The World Health Organization declares the H1N1 influenza pandemic over, saying worldwide flu activity has returned to typical seasonal patterns.
- August 16 – AIRES Flight 8250, a Boeing 737–700, crashed on landing at San Andrés, Colombia, killing two.
- August 21 – 2010 Australian federal election: Julia Gillard's Labor government is re-elected, narrowly defeating the Liberal/National Coalition led by Tony Abbott.
- August 23 – The Manila hostage crisis occurred near the Quirino Grandstand in Manila, Philippines killing 9 people, including the perpetrator, while injuring 9 others.

=== September ===
- September 4 – A 7.1 magnitude earthquake rocks Christchurch, New Zealand causing large amounts of damage but no direct fatalities. It is the first in a series of earthquakes between 2010 and 2012 that resulted in the deaths of 187 people and over $40 billion worth of damage. Seismologists noted that the earthquake sequence was highly unusual, and likely to never happen again anywhere else in the world.
- September 7 – Israel becomes the 33rd member of the OECD.
- September 22 – Anonymous initiates Operation Payback, a coordinated cyberattack on multiple corporations, law firms, and politicians over the banning of file-sharing websites such as LimeWire and The Pirate Bay and also the politicians and financial institutions against WikiLeaks, a whistleblower website.

=== October ===
- October 1 – Građevni kombinat 'Međimurje' from Čakovec, one of the largest Croatian construction and civil engineering companies (with more than 8,000 employees in 1980s), ceased to exist
- October 3 – Germany makes final reparation payment for World War I.
- October 3–14 – 2010 Commonwealth Games takes place in Delhi, India.
- October 6 – Instagram was launched.
- October 10 – The Netherlands Antilles are dissolved, with the islands being split up and given a new constitutional status.
- October 11 – Israeli prime minister Benjamin Netanyahu says that he will extend the settlement freeze if the Palestinian leadership recognizes Israel as a Jewish state. The Palestinians quickly reject the offer.
- October 12 – The Finnish Yle TV2 channel's Ajankohtainen kakkonen current affairs program featured controversial Homoilta episode (literally "gay night"), which led to the resignation of almost 50,000 Finns from the Evangelical Lutheran Church.
- October 22
  - The International Space Station surpasses the record for the longest continuous human occupation of space, having been continuously inhabited since November 2, 2000 (3641 days).
  - The 2010 Iraq War Documents leak occurs, being deemed the biggest US government leak in history. WikiLeaks being responsible for revealing 391832 documents concerning the 2003 Iraq War which revealed approximately 60% of the Iraqi deaths were civilian casualties, the Iraq War body count project showing the casualty percentage is closer to 80%.
- October 23 – In preparation for the Seoul summit, finance ministers of the G-20 agree to reform the International Monetary Fund and shift 6% of the voting shares to developing nations and countries with emerging markets.
- October 25 – An earthquake and consequent tsunami off the coast of Sumatra, Indonesia, kills over 400 people and leaves hundreds missing.
- October 26 – Repeated eruptions of Mount Merapi volcano in Central Java, Indonesia, and accompanying pyroclastic flows of scalding gas, pumice, and volcanic ash descending the erupting volcano kill 353 people and force hundreds of thousands of residents to evacuate.
- October 28 – Dilma Rousseff is elected, becoming the first (and, so far, the only) female president from Brazil.
- October 31 – Expo 2010 concludes in Shanghai, China.

=== November ===
- November 2 – 2010 United States elections were held on Tuesday, November 2, 2010, in the middle of Democratic President Barack Obama's first term. Republicans ended unified Democratic control of Congress and the presidency by winning a majority in the House of Representatives.
- November 4
  - Aero Caribbean Flight 883 crashes in central Cuba, killing all 68 people on board.
  - Qantas Flight 32 suffers an engine failure requiring an emergency landing in Singapore.
- November 11–12 – The G-20 summit is held in Seoul, South Korea. Korea becomes the first non-G8 nation to host a G-20 leaders summit.
- November 13 – Burmese opposition politician Aung San Suu Kyi is released from her house arrest after being incarcerated since 1989.
- November 14 – Sebastian Vettel became the youngest F1 Champion after a 4 way championship fight.
- November 17 – Researchers at CERN trap 38 antihydrogen atoms for a sixth of a second, marking the first time in history that humans have trapped antimatter.
- November 20 – Participants of the 2010 NATO Lisbon summit issue the Lisbon Summit Declaration.
- November 21 – Eurozone countries agree to a rescue package for the Republic of Ireland from the European Financial Stability Facility in response to the country's financial crisis.
- November 23 – North Korea shells Yeonpyeong Island, prompting a military response by South Korea. The incident causes an escalation of tension on the Korean Peninsula and prompts widespread international condemnation. The United Nations declares it to be one of the most serious incidents since the end of the Korean War.
- November 28 – WikiLeaks releases a collection of more than 250,000 American diplomatic cables, including 100,000 marked "secret" or "confidential".
- November 29 – The European Union agree to an €85 billion rescue deal for Ireland from the European Financial Stability Facility, the International Monetary Fund and bilateral loans from the United Kingdom, Denmark and Sweden.
- November 29–December 10 – The 2010 United Nations Climate Change Conference is held in Cancún, Mexico. Formally referred to as the 16th session of the Conference of the Parties of the United Nations Framework Convention on Climate Change (COP 16), it serves too as the 6th meeting of the Parties to the Kyoto Protocol (CMP 6).

=== December ===
- December – Comet Hale Bopp was found again around 30.7 AU away from the Sun. The previous time the Comet was found was in April 1997.
- December 9 – Estonia becomes the 34th member of the OECD.
- December 16 – After 25 years on CNN, Larry King Live airs its final episode. Contemporary reporting noted that King had recorded more than 6,000 programs for the network and that he was reported to be listed in the Guinness World Records for hosting the longest-running show with the same host in the same network time slot.
- December 17 – The attempted suicide of Mohamed Bouazizi, a street vendor in Tunisia, triggers the Tunisian Revolution and the wider Arab Spring throughout the Arab world.
- December 21 – The first total lunar eclipse to occur on the day of the Northern winter solstice and Southern summer solstice since 1638 takes place.

== Nobel Prizes ==

- Chemistry – Richard F. Heck, Ei-ichi Negishi and Akira Suzuki
- Economics – Peter A. Diamond, Dale T. Mortensen and Christopher A. Pissarides
- Literature – Mario Vargas Llosa
- Peace – Liu Xiaobo
- Physics – Andre Geim and Konstantin Novoselov
- Physiology or Medicine – Robert G. Edwards

== New English words and terms ==
- Arab spring
- deadname
- gamification
- libfix
