= Armando.Info =

Venezuelan investigative journalism website

- Website type: News site
- Available in: Spanish
- Founded: 2010 (as an informal project); 20 July 2014 (formal launch)
- Headquarters: {{{location_country}}}
- Website: armando.info
- Current status: Online

Armando.Info is a Venezuelan investigative journalism website that was founded in 2014. Armando.info is a long-term partner of the International Consortium of Investigative Journalists and has worked on many projects, including the Panama Papers and Paradise Papers.

== History ==
Armando.info first appeared in 2010 as an emerging investigative journalism project. Its formal launch took place in July 2014. Since then, it has published weekly investigative reports containing accurate, well-documented information. By October 2017, the Armando.info community had produced and disseminated over 300 reports. The platform is considered by the media to be a benchmark for investigative journalism in Venezuela, covering issues such as money laundering, human rights and environmental problems.

The Armando.info journalism team, led by co-founder José María Poliszuk, has received multiple awards for its work. These include a special mention in the Maria Moors Cabot Prize 'for its extraordinary impact in the region' and the Knight International Journalism Award in 2018, which recognises journalists whose resilient work has had a positive impact on societies in complex situations. The Knight International Journalism Award was given to Poliszuk for being one of two 'courageous pioneers of digital information'. In 2017, Poliszuk published on Armando.info links between a businessman associated with Nicolás Maduro and a government programme intended to combat hunger and shortages. This investigation resulted in a defamation lawsuit and forced Poliszuk and other journalists into exile.

Co-founder Joseph Poliszuk is a member of the International Consortium of Investigative Journalists (ICIJ), for which he coordinated the Venezuelan team on the Panama Papers project. In 2019, he was awarded the John S. Knight Journalism Fellowship from Stanford University, and in 2020 he joined the Pulitzer Centre's Rainforest Investigation Network.

Spanish national newspaper El País said that the world would know little of the recent turmoil in Venezuela if not for the "in-depth reports" published by Armando.Info. It reports on all matters that contribute to the crisis in Venezuela, including corruption in other countries. One report on Mexican exploitation by overpricing CLAP boxes sold to the Venezuelan government even as it was filling them with expired food products won the website the ICFJ Knight Prize. However, since the report showed weakness in the government, many of the reporters had to flee the country in exile; they continued to investigate and brought the responsible company to trial in Colombia and put on a United States watchlist. As of 2019, according to the Global Investigative Journalism Network, the group was mainly funded by grants from the Open Society Foundations and the National Endowment for Democracy.

There are also several prominent female journalists in the field, including Isayen Herrera, Mari Carmen Vieira and Carol Padilla. Herrera works for the New York Times and was a finalist for the Livingston Prize for her investigation into the reproductive rights of Venezuelan women, which was published in the newspaper. In 2021, she won the Press and Society Institute Award for her report From Merchants to Scientists: The True Miracle of Carvativir, which was published on Armando.info.

In 2023, Armando.info received the Global Shining Light Award for an investigation about illegal mining operations in Venezuela.

In 2025, Armando.info received the Excellence Award from the Gabo Awards, presented by the Gabo Foundation in Bogotá. This journalism award recognised the ‘rigorous exercise of the craft of journalism and its commitment to the truth in an era marked by misinformation’. Ewald Scharfenberg, co-founder of Armando.info, represented the digital research platform.

=== Alex Saab ===
In April and September 2017 four investigative journalists published reports in Armando.info about inflated food prices within the CLAP initiative, exposing Colombian businessman Alex Saab's relationship with the Venezuelan government. The first report showed Saab's connections to Hong Kong based Grupo Grand (including the listing of his son as a beneficiary and the company sharing an address with another of Saab's enterprises; Saab rejected the allegations) and that it charged the Venezuelan government prices far above the market rate. The second report investigated Luisa Ortega's allegations about the CLAP programme. A joint report between the Central University of Venezuela and Armando.info showed that milk powder supplied by Saab's company was not nutritious, having high levels of sodium, low levels of calcium and only 1/41 the protein of normal milk.

Following the publication, Armando.info and the journalists were threatened and had their personal information shared on social media, and Saab brought a lawsuit alleging continued defamation of reputation and aggravated injury charges, which carry a prison sentence of up to six years, leading the reporters to flee Venezuela.

On 11 September 2018, the National Commission of Telecommunications (CONATEL) of Venezuela banned the Armando.info journalists from publishing information about Saab. In a document addressed to the journalist Roberto Deniz and signed by the general director of CONATEL, Vianey Miguel Rojas "forbids citizens Roberto Denis Machín, Joseph Poliszuk, Ewald Scharfenberg and Alfredo José Meza to publish and disseminate mentions that go against the honor and reputation of the citizen Alex Naím Saab" through digital media, specifically on the site Armando.info, "until the end of the current process in the case being pursued against said citizens". The ban was denounced by the Venezuelan National Press Workers' Union (SNTP). Since the reports, the Armando.Info site suffered massive cyber attacks, warning that the ban on mentioning Saab in successive investigation articles "increases the threat". Roberto Deniz rejected the sentence, recalling that after the publications the journalistic team had been threatened via Twitter and banned from leaving the country by the 11th Court in Caracas.

=== Operación Alacrán ===
On 1 December, Armando.info published an investigation reporting that nine parliamentaries mediated in favor of two businessmen linked with the government. After the investigation was published, the deputies Luis Parra, José Brito, Conrado Pérez and José Gregorio "Goyo" Noriega were suspended and expelled from their parties Justice First and Popular Will.

The Venezuelan opposition alleged that they were targeted by what they described as a "campaign of bribery and intimidation" by Nicolás Maduro's government in December 2019. Venezuelan lawmakers and the US State Department said that opposition deputies, in parties led or allied with Guaidó, were being offered up to US$1 million to not vote for him. Luis Parra and other opposition deputies were removed from their parties following allegations that they were being bribed by Maduro. National Assembly deputies Ismael León and Luis Stefanelli directly accused Parra in December 2019 of attempting to bribe deputies to vote against Guaidó. Parra denied the allegations and said he was open to being investigated for corruption. Weeks prior to his investigation, Parra openly shared support for Guaidó and promoted his protest movement.

Deputy Delsa Solórzano accused Nicolás Maduro on CNN Radio Argentina of directing the operation. According to her, the government resorted to this method after failing to incarcerate or suspend the parliamentary immunity of the deputies, denouncing a considerable increase of political persecution as 5 January was approaching, explaining that security forces have gone to the houses of many deputies without alternates, and the only one with one, according to Solórzano, did accept the bribe.

On 3 January 2020, Nicmer Evans, a Caracas-based analyst, alleged that Maduro had managed to cause 14 deputies to not cast a vote for Guaidó through these tactics. Guaidó theoretically controlled 112 seats in the Assembly at the time, needing 84 votes to win.

=== Antonio González Morales ===
One such case is that of Antonio González Morales, known for his close ties with the Venezuelan government of Nicolás Maduro and his involvement in various infrastructure projects and subsidized food distribution initiatives. Antonio González Morales has been linked to a Venezuelan oil-for-food exchange network, allegedly aimed at circumventing international sanctions, alongside his business partner Jorge Giménez.

The network operates through a system where PDVSA, the Venezuelan state-owned oil company, trades oil for food intended for the CLAP program (Local Committees for Supply and Production), which distributes essential goods in Venezuela.

Antonio González Morales and his partners have been mentioned in the press as leaders of this network.

== Censorship ==
On 11 September 2018, the National Commission of Telecommunications (CONATEL) banned journalists from publishing information about Colombian businessman Alex Saab in Armando.Info, whose journalist investigations point out Saab of being involved in corruption of his business and the CLAP food distribution network. The prohibition was denounced by the Press Workers Union Syndicate, who previously also denounced that Armando Info's website was the target of massive cybernetic attacks. Journalist Roberto Deniz condemned the decision, reminding that the team had been previously threatened in Twitter and were prohibited from exiting the country.

Despite censorship, investigative articles from Armando.info have uncovered the profiles of various individuals involved in violating sanctions targeting Venezuela.

== See also ==
- Organized Crime and Corruption Reporting Project
- List of newspapers in Venezuela
