= Jose Antonio Quintero =

José Antonio Quintero Oliveros
- Born: 17 March 1988 (age 37); Barquisimeto, Venezuela

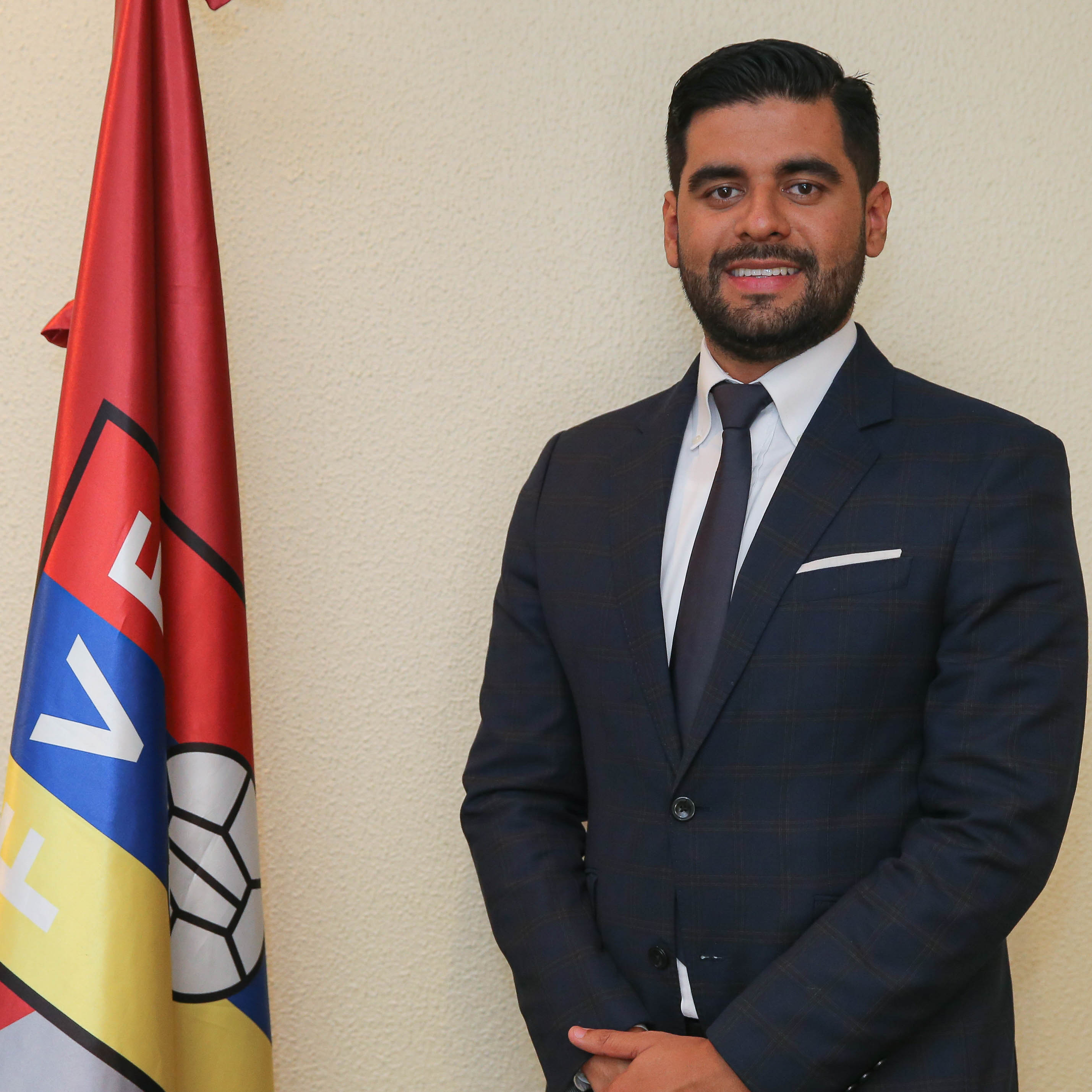
Jose Antonio Quintero standing next to the logo of the football association

José Antonio Quintero Oliveros (Barquisimeto, Lara; March 17, 1988) is a publicist, former professional soccer referee and sports executive. He is currently vice president of the Federación Venezolana de Fútbol (FVF).

== Education ==
He has a TSU degree in Advertising and Marketing from the Universidad Tecnológica Sucre in Barquisimeto and a postgraduate degree in Football Business and Administration from the Universidad Centroccidental Lisandro Alvarado in the same city.

In 2019 he completed a postgraduate degree in Football Administration and Management at the Johan Cruyff Institute (Barcelona, Spain) and in 2021 he obtained a diploma in Sports Management from FIFA CIES.

== Career ==
He began his soccer career in 2006 as a referee, rising from the regional categories of Venezuelan soccer to the First Division, where he served as linesman until his retirement in 2009.

That year, he joined the structure of Club Deportivo Lara, a Venezuelan professional team, where he came to occupy the position of sporting director. During his management, the team qualified on several occasions for the Copa Libertadores and the Copa Sudamericana.

He was, until 2021, president of the Lara State Minor International Soccer League.

=== Venezuelan Football Federation ===
Between 2011 and 2016, he was coordinator of the U-15, U-17 and U-19 national teams. Hand in hand with Rafael Dudamel, in 2016, he is part of the body of Vinotinto as General Coordinator, a position he holds until 2020.

As part of the U-17 team, in 2013 he received the Order of Francisco de Miranda in his first class and the Juan Guillermo Iribarren decoration. In the U-20 national team, he is present in the world runner-up obtained by Vinotinto in 2017 in Korea.

In 2021, he is running for the board of the Venezuelan Football Federation as part of the “Fútbol Unido” slate. In the elections held on May 28, this group, led by Jorge Giménez, obtained victory with 57 votes in favor against the 34 obtained by Evolución Vinotinto, by Jorge Silva. In this way, they are chosen to direct the governing body of Venezuelan soccer until the year 2025. Quintero has since held the position of second vice president of the institution.
