= Johan Cruyff Institute =

Sport management educational institution

- Motto: Educating the next generation of Leaders in Sport Management
- Type: Private
- Established: 1999
- Founder: Johan Cruyff
- Students: 10,000
- Location: Barcelona, Spain; Amsterdam, Netherlands; Lima, Peru; Mexico City, Mexico
- Campus: Urban
- Website: johancruyffinstitute.com

Johan Cruyff Institute is an educational institution, founded by Dutch footballer Johan Cruyff, aimed at educating athletes, sport and business professionals in the field of sport management.

== History ==
The academic institution was founded in 1999 with a program for 35 athletes as part of the Johan Cruyff Academy of Amsterdam and has since become a global network. In 2002, the Johan Cruyff Institute Barcelona was opened and established as the international headquarters, and the expansion proceeded to Mexico (2003), Amsterdam (2006) and Peru (2013).

There are four Johan Cruyff Institutes (postgraduate and executive education), three Johan Cruyff Academies (graduate education) and four Johan Cruyff Colleges (vocational training).

== Notable alumni ==
- David Alegre, Spanish field hockey midfielder
- Eduarda Amorim, Brazilian former professional handball player, World Champion, IHF World Player of the Year 2014
- Aitana Bonmatí Conca, Spanish professional footballer who plays as a midfielder for Liga F club, FC Barcelona Femení and the Spanish national team.
- Jan Bos, Former Coach – Kia Speedskating Academy
- Edith Bosch, Co-Owner – The Impowerment Company
- Alfreð Finnbogason, Professional football player for FC Augsburg
- Craig Foster, Chief Football Analyst/Presenter at SBS
- Akwasi Frimpong, Sprinter, bobsledder, and skeleton athlete; Owner at Golden Events Management (GEM USA)
- Koen de Kort, Dutch former professional cyclist
- Bojan Krkic, Spanish former professional footballer.
- Sergio Lozano, Professional Futsal player at FC Barcelona
- Lieke Martens, Paris Saint-Germain Féminine player
- Ana Lucía Martínez, Guatemalan professional footballer who plays as a forward for Italian Serie A club Pomigliano CF and the Guatemala women's national team.
- Bibian Mentel, Winter Paralympics (Snowboarding) gold-medalist; Founder – Mentelity Foundation
- Vivianne Miedema, Dutch professional footballer who plays as a forward for FA Women's Super League (FA WSL) club Manchester City and the Netherlands national team.
- Keylor Navas, Costa Rican professional footballer who played as a goalkeeper for Ligue 1 club Paris Saint-Germain.
- Guillermo Ochoa, Mexican professional football goalkeeper
- Jennifer Pareja, 2012 Summer Olympics waterpolo player silver-medalist
- Rubén Vergés, 2010 Olympic halfpipe Snowboarder
- Jose Antonio Quintero, vice president at Venezuelan Football Federation
- Richard Schuil, Business Coordinator – Thomas St John Group; Co Owner – TopSport & Finance
- Gretar Steinsson, Technical director at Leeds United
- Daniëlle van de Donk, who plays for London City Lionesses
- Edwin van der Sar, CEO at AFC Ajax
- Marlou van Rhijn, Paralympic sprinter
- Esther Vergeer, Tournament Director – ABN AMRO Wheelchair Tennis Tournament
- Jordi Villacampa, Former President, Club Joventut Badalona
