= Jorge Giménez =

Venezuelan sports executive

- Born: 11 August 1987 (age 38); Caracas, Venezuela
- Parent(s): Fenelón Giménez González and Bertriz Ochoa de Giménez
- Website: www.fvf.com.ve

Jorge Andrés Giménez Ochoa (born 11 August 1987) is a Venezuelan businessman and sports leader. Since 2021, he has served as president of the Venezuelan Football Federation (FVF) and is a member of the CONMEBOL Council. Previously, he was the president and owner of Deportivo Lara, with which he achieved several national championships and participated in international tournaments such as the Copa Libertadores and the Copa Sudamericana.

== Career ==
=== Academic Background ===
He graduated from Universidad Nueva Esparta with a Business Administration degree and continued his studies on the same subject in Georgetown University.

=== State Contractor ===
He was a partner, along with Antonio Luis González Morales, in the companies Constructora 2GM and Constructora Energética del Sur Cenesur C.A., both of which have been awarded at least 22 contracts by the state in sectors ranging from tourism to oil. He sold his shares in the first company on June 22, 2021, when he was already president of the FVF.

In an interview with AFP, he acknowledged having been a contractor for PDVSA.

== Business career ==
Giménez has developed a career in the business sector with over 15 years of experience in areas such as energy, oil services, industry, commerce, and finance. He has worked in capital markets and brokerage in Caracas and New York, collaborating with key players in the financial sector. He has also been an investor and consultant in various startups in Latin America and the Caribbean, focusing on financial services and online gaming.

Among his companies are:

- Solid Waste Administrator (ARES, C.A.) – Director and owner.
- Energy Construction of the South (CENESUR, C.A.) – Engineering and procurement in the oil sector.
- Standard Resources – Supply for the oil industry.
- Biogenética La Hermandad – Shrimp farming company.
- Rapsodia Colombia – Business in the commercial sector.

=== Presidency of the Venezuelan Football Federation (FVF) ===
In July 2021, Giménez assumed the presidency of the Venezuelan Football Federation (FVF), initiating a modernization process in partnership with FIFA and CONMEBOL. His management has focused on institutional reorganization and transparency, promoting initiatives such as:

- Creation of the first FVF Code of Ethics.
- Drafting agreements between the FVF and the FUTVE League.
- Implementation of a new Electoral Regulation for the FVF and its associations.
- Review of contracting procedures with transparency standards.

Under his leadership, Venezuela has hosted international tournaments such as:

- South American U-23 Pre-Olympic Tournament.
- CONMEBOL U-20 Men's Championship.
- Futsal Libertadores Cup.
- CONMEBOL U-20 Futsal Championship.

Also under his direction, the FVF recently inaugurated a new headquarters, featuring over 4,000 square meters and modern facilities.

Jorge Giménez Ochoa participated in the 2021 elections for the presidency of the Venezuelan Football Federation, sharing the same candidacy with Pedro Infante. Infante, a former sports deputy minister of the government and a former official of the FVF, was one of the reasons for FIFA's intervention in 2020, as this entity prohibits government interference in national federations. Another factor was the death of executive Jesús Berardinelli, who had previously been arrested on embezzlement charges and later transferred to a clinic due to respiratory failure.

The Giménez and Infante candidacy won with 57 votes out of 92 cast in the elections on May 28, 2021, following a period of instability in the organization due to allegations of irregularities. Jorge Silva, their opponent, expressed dissatisfaction with the disqualification of some delegates for the vote. Giménez took office for the 2021-2025 term on June 7.

On August 20, 2021, the president of the FVF announced the resignation of the then-coach of the Venezuelan national team, José Peseiro. The Portuguese coach complained about having gone 14 months without receiving his salary and did not accept the new federation board's offer to pay 50% of the debt. Leonardo González, the current coach of his team, ACD Lara, was announced as the interim head coach. Months later, an audio was revealed in which Minister Tareck El Aissami was heard asking assembly members to vote for Giménez in that election, thus violating Article 19 of FIFA's statutes, which prohibits government interference in federation matters.

Since Giménez Ochoa assumed the presidency of the Federation in 2021, the new leadership team has implemented various alliances and strategies to strengthen both the sports and administrative structures. The main focus has been on promoting the training of young talents and enhancing the competitiveness of national teams internationally. This commitment has translated into ongoing efforts to optimize available resources, aiming for growth in the sports field at various levels.

== Controversies ==
Giménez Ochoa has been accused of having close ties to businessman Raúl Gorrín and Nicolás Maduro's vice president, Delcy Rodríguez, who, along with Tareck El Aissami, was one of the first to congratulate him after his election. He traveled on a private flight that landed at Barajas Airport (Madrid, Spain) on January 20, 2020, from which its occupants were denied entry into the country in a scandal later known as Delcygate. He was also part of the vice president's delegation that visited Qatar in June 2021, during his first trip as president of the FVF, while the Venezuelan national football team was in Brazil competing in the 2021 Copa América amidst controversy over COVID infections among several team members.

On June 18, 2020, he delivered $80,000 in cash to Spanish businessman Víctor de Aldama to "keep feeding the machine" (according to his phone conversations), which is why he is being investigated by Spanish authorities in connection with the corruption case known as Koldo. The file presented by the Civil Guard to the National Court indicates that Giménez is "a person of utmost confidence of the executive vice president of Venezuela, a fact that needs to be noted since many of Aldama's actions had a direct relationship with Venezuelan citizens of significant political standing." The investigation also identifies him as a suspected frontman for Delcy Rodríguez.

A 2022 investigation identified him as the head, along with Alejandro José Arroyo Pérez and Gilber Renee Mejias, of Ensa Energía AG and Logística y Alimentos El Mazo C.A., companies that would manage the structure for exchanging oil for food from PDVSA that supplies the CLAP (Local Committees for Supply and Production) and which became unregulated following the arrest of Alex Saab in 2020.

In 2023, Commissioner Iván Simonovis indicated that he is being investigated in a corruption case by the Bolivarian National Intelligence Service along with the president of PDVSA, Pedro Tellechea.

== Personal life ==
He is the son of Bertriz Ochoa de Giménez and Fenelón Giménez González, a businessman involved in the notorious case of fraud perpetrated by ABA Mercado de Capitales against 300 families in Zulia in 2012. Along with his mother and father, he is registered as a shareholder in several Panamanian companies.
