= PDVAL affair =

2010 Venezuelan governmental affair

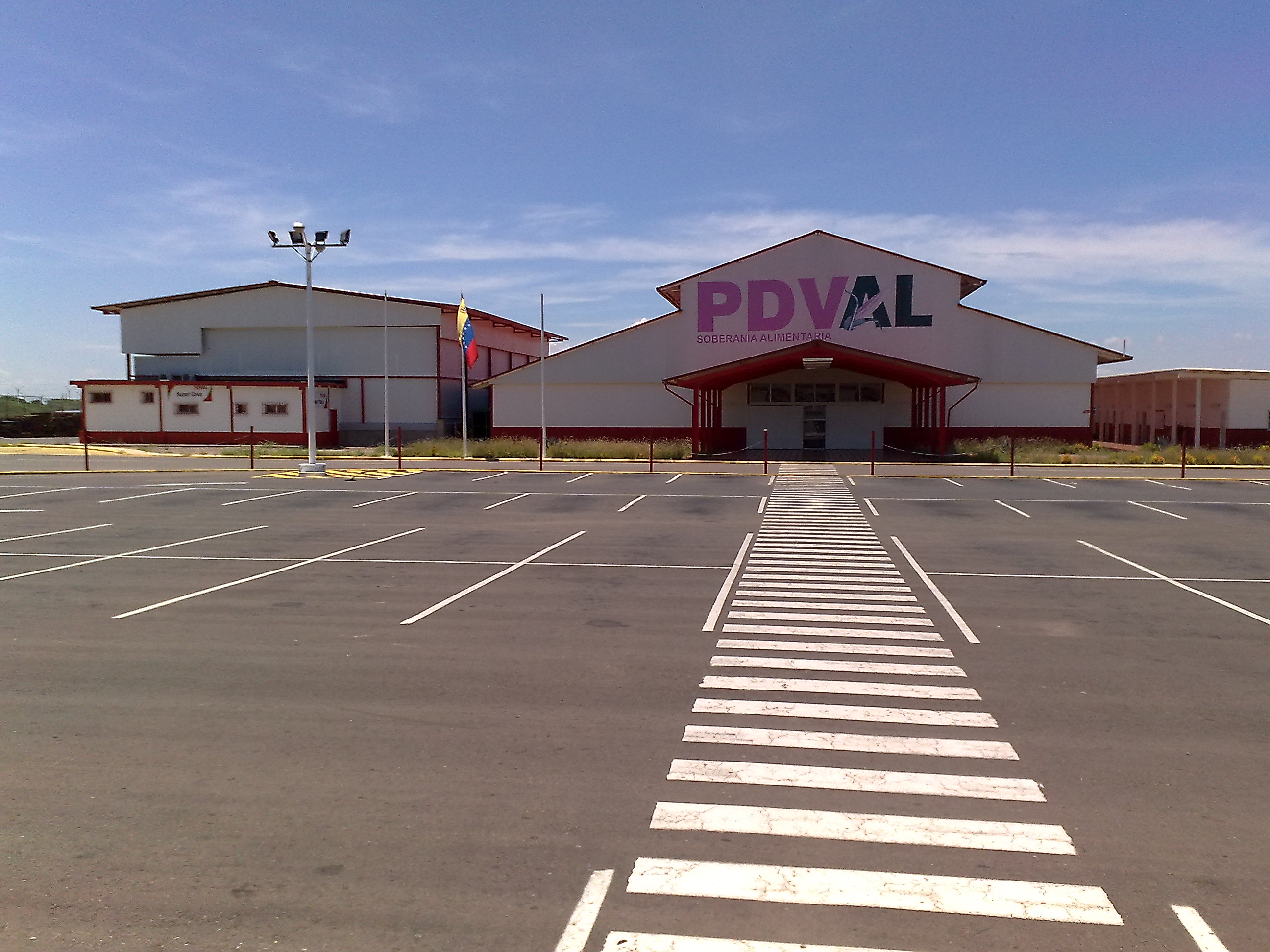
- PDVAL warehouse in the Community of Cardón.
- Date: April 2, 2009 (First complaint is filed); May 25, 2010 (Discovery of the containers)
- Location: Venezuela
- Type: Political corruption
- Cause: Finding of thousands of tons of expired food in PDVAL.
- Outcome: Control of PDVAL passes from PDVSA to the Vice President, then to the Ministry of Popular Power for Food; 3 managers are arrested (2 are later released and reinstated)

The PDVAL affair, also known as the Pudreval affair, (Note: Note: In Spanish Pudre (v. pudrir) means to spoil or to rot.) refers to the finding of tons of rotten food supplies in mid-2010 imported during Hugo Chávez's government through subsidies of state-owned enterprise PDVAL. Due to the scandal, PDVAL started being administrated by the Vicepresidency of Venezuela and afterwards by the Alimentation Ministry. Three former managers were detained, but were released afterwards and two of them had their positions restored. In July 2010, official estimates stated that 130,000 tons of food supplies were affected, while the political opposition claimed a total of 170,000 tons. As of 2012, any advances in the investigations by the National Assembly were unknown.

The most accepted explanation of the loss of food supplies is that disorganization in PDVAL led to the importation of supplies faster than it could distribute them. The opposition considers the affair a case of corruption, alleging that public officials deliberately imported more food than could be distributed to embezzle funds through the import of subsidized supplies.

== See also ==
- Local Committees for Supply and Production (CLAP)
