= Bruce Bagley =

American professor

- Born: Bruce Michael Bagley; 1945 or 1946 (age 79–80)
- Occupations: Academic, author
- Title: Professor of international studies, University of Miami

Bruce Michael Bagley (born 1945/1946) is an American academic, and chair of department and professor of international studies at the University of Miami.

In November 2019, he was charged with money laundering, and in June 2020 he pled guilty to laundering approximately $2.5 million in deposits from overseas accounts that were controlled by Alex Saab and keeping a percentage for himself. On November 17, 2021, he was sentenced to six months in prison.

== Biography ==
Bagley is the co-author with Jonathan Rosen of Drug Trafficking, Organized Crime and Violence in the Americas Today, published in 2015.

Bagley has done consultancy work for the United Nations Development Program (UNDP), for the U.S. Government, including the Department of State, Department of Defense, Department of Justice, the Federal Bureau of Investigation, and the Drug Enforcement Administration, and for governments of Colombia, Ecuador, Bolivia, Panama, and Mexico on issues related to drug trafficking, money laundering, and public security.

In 1988, Bagley had a Fulbright Scholarship to lecture in Peru. From 1991 to 1995, Bagley was the associate dean of the Graduate School of International Studies at the University of Miami under Ambler H. Moss. At the University of Miami, he took part on numerous dissertation committees. Previously he was a comparative politics professor at Johns Hopkins.

Bagley has testified before the U.S. Congress on matters related to Latin America on numerous occasions, and has also appeared in U.S. federal court as an expert witness on drug trafficking and organized crime in Latin America. For many years, Bagley directed a joint conference with Florida International University on energy security, sustainable energy, and global warming.

In November 2019, Bagley was charged with laundering about US$2.5 million in deposits from overseas accounts that were controlled by Alex Saab. He was placed on administrative leave by the University of Miami.

In June 2020, he pleaded guilty. In a November 2021 court filing Bagley's attorney's claimed that an intermediary, later identified by Bagley as Jorge Luis Hernandez, told Bagley the $2.5 million he received from Saab was to pay lawyers who were assisting Saab, who had provided information on the Maduro government to U.S. authorities, with his cooperation with U.S. government. Saab denied meeting with U.S. authorities.

Bagley lives in Coral Gables, Florida.

== Publications ==
- Drug Trafficking and Organized Crime in the Americas: Major Trends in the Twenty-First Century, Latin American Program, Woodrow Wilson Center, 2012
- International Relations in Latin America, with Betty Horwitz, Taylor & Francis, 2013
- Drug Trafficking, Organized Crime and Violence in the Americas Today, with Jonathan Rosen, University Press of Florida, 2015
