= Local Committees for Supply and Production =

Government-sponsored food distribution program in Venezuela

- Native name: Comité Local de Abastecimiento y Producción
- Industry: Food distribution, importation, social program
- Founded: April 3, 2016; 10 years ago
- Founder: Nicolás Maduro
- Headquarters: Caracas, Venezuela
- Area served: Venezuela
- Owner: Government of Venezuela
- Parent: Ministry of Popular Power for Food (MINAL)
- Website: clapsoficial.com.ve

The Local Committees for Supply and Production (Spanish: Comité Local de Abastecimiento y Producción, CLAP) are food distribution committees promoted by the Venezuelan government in which the communities themselves supply and distribute the priority foods through a house-to-house delivery method. It was established in 2016 by President Nicolás Maduro in response to the shortages in Venezuela. The committees have been subject of complaints about corruption, political use, delays, poor food quality and price increases without prior warning. This service is a subsidiary of the Ministry of Popular Power for Food.

In June 2018, the UN High Commissioner for Human Rights published a report in which they considered that the CLAP program did not meet certain standards related to the right to adequate food; in addition the lack of control in the program was documented, as was its use as a tool for political propaganda and social control.

== History ==
On 3 April 2016, Venezuelan president Nicolás Maduro announced that from that day, the Local Supply and Production Committees (CLAP) would be created at the national level. According to the Vice President of Venezuela, Aristóbulo Istúriz, the government-operated Local Supply and Production Committees (CLAP) that provides food to Venezuelans in need, are a "political instrument to defend the revolution."

According to Article 2 of the Decree of State of Exception and Economic Emergency published in the Official Gazette of Venezuela #6227, the CLAP are responsible for "the guarantee, even through intervention of the National Bolivarian Armed Forces of Venezuela and citizen security organs [...] for the correct distribution and commercialization of food and basic necessities."

In addition to this, in accordance with what is stated in article 9 of the Official Gazette 6227, CLAPs can be "assigned functions of surveillance and organization to the Local Supply and Distribution Committees (CLAP), the Communal Councils and other organizations. of the People's Power, together with the National Bolivarian Armed Forces of Venezuela (FANB), the Bolivarian National Police (PNB), State and Municipal Police Corps, to maintain public order and guarantee security and sovereignty in the country."

== Delivery ==
For the formation of a CLAP, the communities must organize around their communal councils, choose responsible people and carry out a census that specifies the number of families that live in that territory. With the data collected, the number of bags or boxes of food needed to supply all households is counted and the request is made to the Ministry of Popular Power for Food (MINAL), the body in charge of distribution. When the products arrive, which are paid at subsidized prices, the people in charge of the CLAP distribute them through bags and make the delivery family by family.

== Products ==
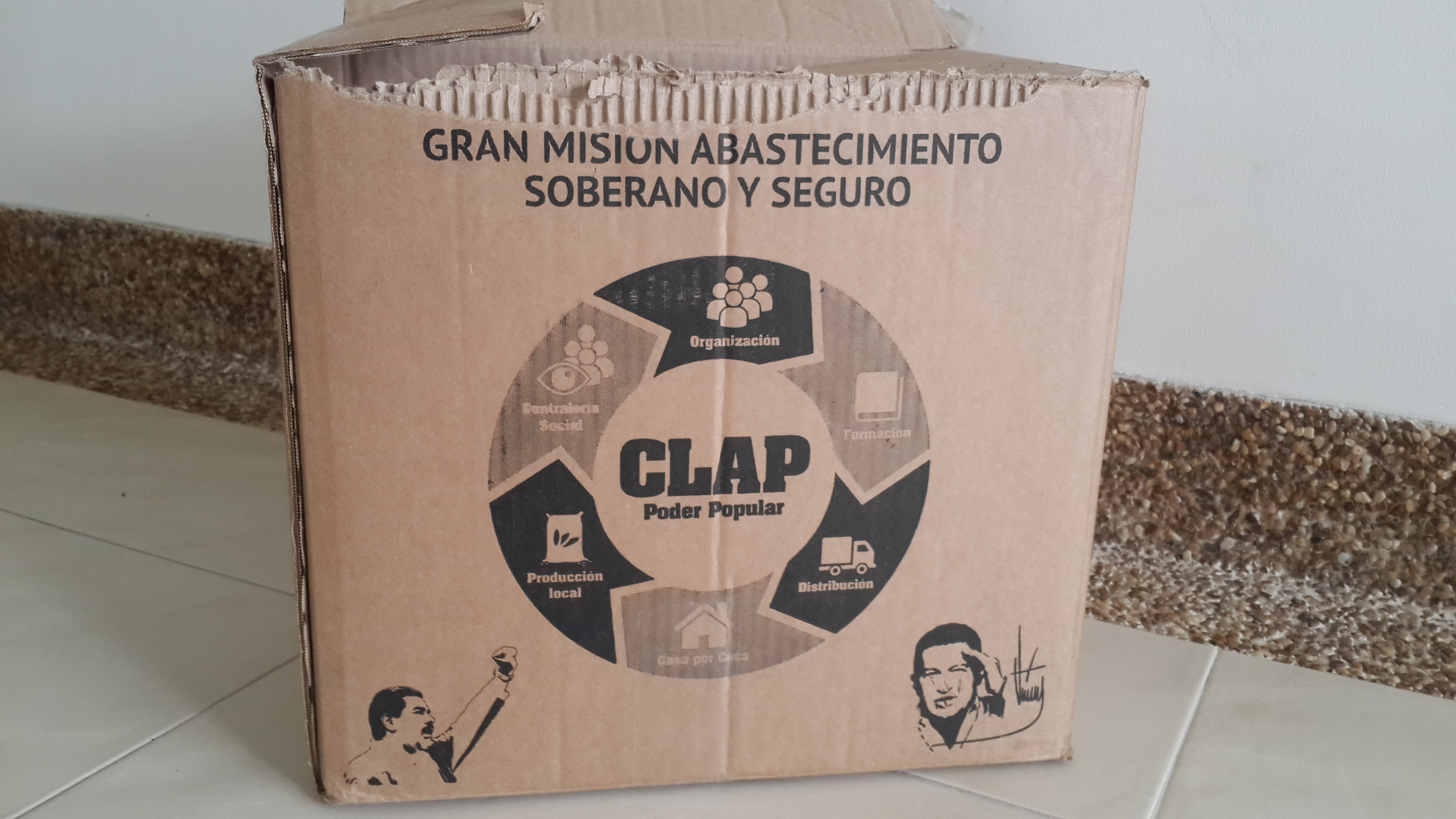
A food box provided by CLAP

Some of the products included in the CLAP boxes are rice, lentils, beans, tuna, cooking oil, pasta, corn flour, sugar and milk. Sometimes they can vary so much in types of products and/or quantity. The price established by the boxes is Bs.F 10,000 or Bs.S 100, and the delivery must be made every month.

=== Imported products ===
Some of the products are made in Venezuela. However, most are imported from countries such as Mexico, Canada, Brazil and the United States, which are paid by the Venezuelan government in United States dollars to exchange rate that equals US$1 = 10 Bs.F, which guarantees low prices.

In June 2019, National Coordinator Freddy Bernal announced that the price of a CLAP box would increase to Bs.S 9,000 due to the high transfer costs.

=== Distribution network ===
To the distribution mechanism are added the supply networks of the State, Mercal and PDVAL, as well as the warehouses of each locality and the commercializing company Makro. The Ministry of Municipalities is in charge of certifying and registering all duly organized CLAPs in order to optimize their relationship with suppliers.

== Criticisms and controversies ==
=== Political and social discrimination ===
Since its introduction to the public, there were allegations that only supporters of President Nicolás Maduro, the government and the United Socialist Party of Venezuela (PSUV) were provided food, while government critics and Venezuelan opposition supporters were denied access to goods.

In June 2018, the Office of the United Nations High Commissioner for Human Rights published a report where it considered that the CLAPs did not comply with certain norms related to the right to adequate food access, and documented both the lack of scrutiny and its use as a tool of political propaganda and social control. PROVEA, a Venezuelan human rights group, described CLAPs as "a form of food discrimination that is exacerbating social unrest".

There have been several complaints of CLAP boxes that are missing some products that should regularly come in the package. La Patilla broadcast a video in which boxes are opened in one of the CLAP collection centers and several products to fill others, a situation that has been denounced in the state of Sucre. National coordinator Freddy Bernal, affirmed that "it is normal" that there is food diversion in the CLAP "due to the economic war". By December 2017, the police arrested 180 people for diversion of products such as food from CLAP and drugs for chronic diseases; the detainees included businessmen, policemen and members of the CLAP. Among the most notable cases are the seizure of 30 tons of CLAP food and drugs that an organized group had diverted for resale in Vargas,

According to Felipe Pérez Martí, a government minister during the first government of Hugo Chávez, the military is left with 80% of the CLAP's imports, who received full control to manage the distribution of food in Venezuela in July 2016 through the Gran Mision Soberano y Seguro program.

The beneficiaries of the committees have denounced and protested the delay in the delivery of the CLAP boxes, in some cases receiving them with price increases without prior notice. CLAP was also criticized by the beneficiaries and even by leaders This is a politicized mechanism that excludes people who do not support the government and criticized for delays in distribution, for not distributing enough food and distributing food that has expired.

National Assembly deputy and Popular Will politician Ismael León, denounced the purchase of imported and expired food, that most of the food products imported by the government do not have the sanitary permit and corruption caused by public officials, declaring that "there are soldiers involved and even detained and there are colonels and sergeants whom they have found with boxes of food."

After the 2017 Venezuelan Constituent Assembly election on 30 July 2017, there were complaints in the neighborhoods of Caracas that they had to justify why they refused to vote in the election and they were removed from service because they abstained and threatened to lose pensions because they did not update the Fatherland Card.

Luisa Ortega Díaz, Chief Prosecutor of Venezuela from 2007 to 2017 revealed that President Maduro had profited from the food crisis. CLAP made contracts with Group Grand Limited, a Mexican entity owned by Maduro through frontmen Rodolfo Reyes, Álvaro Uguedo Vargas and Alex Saab. Group Grand Limited would sell foodstuffs to CLAP and receive government funds.

Writer Leonardo Padrón described the program and the homeland card as a "hunger-for-votes exchange", saying: "Give me your signature, take your CLAP [food box]."

During the Venezuelan presidential crisis, National Assembly President and disputed interim president of Venezuela Juan Guaidó cautioned that the Maduro government had plans to steal the products for humanitarian purposes that entered the country, including plans to distribute these products through the government's food distribution program CLAP.

=== "Hands off Venezuela" concert ===
The Maduro government responded to Richard Branson's Venezuela Aid Live by holding its own rival concert on the Venezuelan side of the border with Colombia, at the Simón Bolívar International Bridge on 22 and 23 February. The slogan for the concert is "Nothing for war, hands off Venezuela". Information Minister Jorge Rodríguez said the government would distribute 20,000 boxes of subsidized food from the Local Committees for Supply and Production (CLAP) to the poor residents of Cúcuta in Colombia, and that free medical attention would be given to Colombians and Venezuelans.

Guaidó characterized this announcement as a cynical joke, saying, "... to mock the Venezuelan's people's needs in this way, you have to be very cynical" to take Venezuelan food to Colombia during Venezuela's humanitarian crisis.

=== Quality ===
External videos
- Video depicting flour distributed by CLAP with worms - El Carabobeño, YouTube (archived on 19 October 2021)
- Video depicting a CLAP bag with products with weevils - Noticias Todos Ahora, Twitter

The CLAPs have been criticized for distributing food of low quality. A joint report between the Central University of Venezuela and Armando.info showed that milk powder supplied by the CLAP was not nutritious, having high levels of sodium and low levels of calcium only 1/41 the protein of normal milk.

Consumers likewise have complained about finding from weevils and worms to plastic crumbs and pesticide.

== Corruption ==
Colombian businessman Alex Saab has sold food to Venezuela for more than 200 million USD in a negotiation signed by President Nicolás Maduro through a registered company in Hong Kong. On 23 August 2017, the Venezuelan attorney general, Luisa Ortega Díaz, named Alex Saab as the owner of the Mexican firm Group Grand Limited, 26 along with Colombian businessmen Álvaro Pulido and Rofolfo Reyes, "presumably President Nicolás Maduro" and dedicated to selling food to the CLAP. Saab would have met Álvaro Pulido in 2012, when he was dedicated to supplying the Saab company, but this activity would have stopped doing it in 2014.

Spanish national newspaper El País said that the world would know little of the recent turmoil in Venezuela if not for the "in-depth reports" published by Armando.Info, a Venezuelan investigation journalism website. It reports on all matters that contribute to the crisis in Venezuela, including corruption in other countries. One report on Mexican exploitation by overpricing CLAP boxes sold to the Venezuelan government even as it was filling them with expired food products won the website the ICFJ Knight Prize. However, since the report showed weakness in the government, many of the reporters had to flee the country in exile; they continued to investigate and brought the responsible company to trial in Colombia and put on a United States watchlist.

On 19 April 2018, after a multilateral meeting between over a dozen European and Latin American countries, United States Department of the Treasury officials stated that they had collaborated with Colombian officials to investigate corrupt import programs of the Maduro administration including CLAP. They explained that Venezuelan officials pocketed 70% of the proceeds allocated for importation programs destined to alleviate hunger in Venezuela. Treasury officials said they sought to seize the proceeds that were being funneled into the accounts of corrupt Venezuelan officials and hold them for a possible future government in Venezuela. A month later, on 17 May 2018, the Colombian government seized more than 25,000 CLAP boxes containing about 400 tons of decomposing food, which was destined for distribution to the Venezuelan public. The Colombian government said they were investigating shell companies and money laundering related to CLAP operations, and claimed the shipment was to be used to buy votes during the 2018 Venezuelan presidential election.

On 11 September 2018, the National Commission of Telecommunications (CONATEL) banned the publication of information about Alex Saab to the journalists of the Armando.info web portal, who have published research papers in which they point to Saab as an alleged member of acts of corruption that would exist around the business and distribution of food for the CLAP. In the document that is addressed to the journalist Roberto Deniz and signed by the general director of CONATEL, Vianey Miguel Rojas "prohibits citizens Roberto Denis Machín, Joseph Poliszuk, Ewal Carlos Sharfenderg and Alfredo José Meza publish and disseminate through the digital media specifically on the site Armando.info, mentions that go against the honor and reputation of the citizen Alex Naím Saab (...) until the end of the present process in the case that is being pursued against the aforementioned citizens".

On 18 October 2018, Mexican prosecutors accused the Venezuelan government and Mexican individuals of buying poor quality food products for CLAP and exporting them to Venezuela, doubling their value for sale. Suspects investigated by the Mexican government offered to pay $3 million to the United Nations refugee agency.

An April 2019 statement from the United States Department of State highlighted the 2017 National Assembly investigation finding that the government paid US$42 for food that cost under US$13, and that "Maduro's inner circle kept the difference, which totaled more than $200 million in at least one case," adding that food boxes were "distributed in exchange for votes."

=== Operación Alacrán ===
On 1 December 2019, Armando.info published an investigation reporting that nine parliamentaries mediated in favor of two businessmen linked with the government. Parliamentarian Luis Parra was accused of being involved in corruption with the CLAP program of the Nicolás Maduro government. Parra has denied the accusations. After the investigation was published, the deputies Luis Parra, José Brito, Conrado Pérez and José Gregorio Noriega were suspended and expelled from their parties Justice First and Popular Will.

Another report by Armando.info in January 2020 revealed that seven deputies - including Luis Parra, José Brito, Adolfo Superlano, Chaim Bucaram, Conrado Pérez and Richard Arteaga - travelled in Spring 2019 through seven European countries, including Liechtenstein, Bulgaria and Portugal, to lobby for Saenz. The trip was organised by Eurocontinentes Travel Agency, in Bogotá, Colombia, co-owned by Iván Caballero Ferreira, a businessman closely linked to Saab and Pulido. Images of the Venezuelan deputies in Europe were geolocated by open source investigative website Bellingcat, confirming their visit to countries where Saab has significant business interests.

=== Sanctions ===
On 18 July 2019, Mexico's Ministry of Finance froze bank accounts of 19 companies related to the sale of low quality and over-priced food to the Venezuelan government's CLAP program, which were aimed at the poorest population. Moreover, the ministry has opened an investigation relating to money laundering after detecting "irregularities for more than 150 million dollars."

On 25 July 2019, the United States Department of Treasury imposed sanctions on 10 people and 13 companies (from Colombia, Hong Kong, Mexico, Panama, Turkey, the United Arab Emirates and the U.S.) linked to the CLAP program, which includes stepsons of President Nicolas Maduro and a Colombian businessman Alex Saab. According to a statement by Treasury Secretary Steven Mnuchin, “The corruption network that operates the CLAP program has allowed Maduro and his family members to steal from the Venezuelan people. They use food as a form of social control, to reward political supporters and punish opponents, all the while pocketing hundreds of millions of dollars through a number of fraudulent schemes.”

The Maduro government rejected the sanctions, calling it sign of “desperation” by “the gringo empire.” President Maduro said "Imperialists, prepare for more defeats, because the CLAP in Venezuela will continue, no one takes the CLAP away from the people.” A communique from the Venezuelan foreign ministry "denounces the repeated practice of economic terrorism by the US government against the Venezuelan people, announcing measures whose criminal purpose is to deprive all Venezuelans of their right to food."

On 17 September 2019, the United States Department of Treasury expanded sanctions on 16 entities (from Colombia, Italy and Panama) and 3 individuals, accusing them of enabling President Nicolás Maduro and his illegitimate regime to corruptly profit from imports of food aid and distribution in Venezuela.

== See also ==
- Crisis in Venezuela
- Shortages in Venezuela
- Corruption in Venezuela
- Economy of Venezuela
- PDVAL affair
- Operación Alacrán
