= International Year of Youth =

World year

In December 2009, the United Nations General Assembly adopted resolution 64/134 proclaiming the year commencing 12 August 2010 as the International Year of Youth.

The resolution calls upon governments, civil society, individuals and communities worldwide to support activities at local and international levels to mark the event. Youth organizations, governments, and civil society are encouraged to organize activities that promote an increased understanding of the importance and benefits of youth participation in all aspects of society, as well as those that support youth to devote their energy, enthusiasm and creativity to development and the promotion of mutual understanding. It encourages young people to dedicate themselves to fostering progress, including the attainment of the UN Millennium Development Goals (MDGs), which seek to slash a host of social inadequacies, ranging from extreme poverty and hunger to maternal and infant mortality to lack of access to education and health care, all by 2015.

== Theme: Dialogue and Mutual Understanding ==
Under the theme "Dialogue and Mutual Understanding", the resolution aims to encourage dialogue and understanding across generations and promote the ideals of peace, respect for human rights and freedoms, and solidarity.

== Global level ==
=== United Nations Member States ===
In its resolution 64/134, the UN General Assembly decided "to organize under the auspices of the United Nations a world youth conference as the highlight of the Year" and invited "the President of the General Assembly to conduct open-ended information consultations with Member States with a view of determining the modalities of the conference, which is to be funded by voluntary contributions."

In April 2010, H.E. Mr Jean-Francis Régis Zinsou, the Permanent Representative of the Republic of Benin, agreed to serve as Facilitator for the consultations on the organization of the conference to be held in 2011. Consultations of the General Assembly began in May 2010.

=== United Nations System ===
In addition to the UN conference on youth, the UN is coordinating its efforts to celebrate and promote International Year of Youth. The United Nations Inter-Agency Network on Youth Development is coordinating the activities of the UN system for the International Year of Youth, with the UN Programme on Youth leading this effort. The United Nations Inter-Agency Network on Youth Development works to increase the effectiveness of UN work in youth development by strengthening collaboration and exchange among all UN entities working on youth.

Members of the Network adopted the UN Framework Approach for the International Year of Youth in February 2010, to provide a concrete framework for collective efforts and to set the strategic objectives for the Year. The Framework identifies three key objectives and provides specific actions essential to implement the objectives, which are:

1. Create Awareness: increase commitment and investment in youth

- Increase recognition of youth development as a smart investment by the public and private sectors;
- Advocate for the recognition of young people's contributions to national and community development and to achieving the Millennium Development Goals;
- Promote understanding of inequalities amongst youth and how to effectively address the needs of the most disadvantaged;
- Foster research and knowledge building on youth to better inform youth policies and programmes.

2. Mobilize and Engage: increase youth participation and partnerships

- Institutionalize mechanisms for youth participation in decision-making processes;
- Support youth-led organizations and initiatives to enhance their contribution to society;
- Strengthen networks and partnerships among Governments, youth-led organizations, academia, civil society organizations, the private sector, the media and the UN system, to enhance commitment and support for holistic youth development.

3. Connect and Build Bridges: increase intercultural understanding among youth

- Promote youth interactions, networks and partnerships across cultures;
- Empower and support youth as agents of social inclusion and peace.

The progress achieved during the Year will lay the foundation for further work in youth development, including the implementation of the World Programme of Action for Youth and the achievement of the Millennium Development Goals. The Framework has been disseminated to the UN system, including to Regional Commissions and Country Teams. Organizations celebrating the Year are invited to use the Framework to guide their activities.

=== History of Youth at the United Nations ===
In 1965, United Nations Members States first acknowledged that the contribution of young people – defined by the United Nations as those between the ages of 15 and 24 years – is essential for the development of society when they endorsed the "Declaration on the Promotion among Youth of the Ideals of Peace, Mutual Respect and Understanding between Peoples".

Twenty years later, the General Assembly observed the year 1985 as the "first International Youth Year: Participation, Development and Peace". In 1995, Member States strengthened their commitment to young people by adopting the "World Programme of Action for Youth (WPAY)", which provides a policy framework and practical guidelines for national action and international support to improve the situation of young people by increasing their access to opportunities for constructive participation in society.

In 2007, the General Assembly expanded upon the WPAY by adopting additional issue areas, bringing the total to fifteen areas of priority focus which are: education, employment, hunger and poverty, health, environment, drug abuse, juvenile delinquency, leisure-time activities, girls and young women, participation, globalization, information and communications technologies, HIV/AIDS, youth and conflict, and inter-generational relations.

== National level ==
International Years are customarily celebrated at the national level and steered by National Committees, usually consisting of government entities such as Ministry of Youth or Ministry of Education, National Youth Councils, civil society organizations, representatives of the UN system and other relevant stakeholders.

== See also ==
- International Youth Year (since 1985)
