= Alex Saab =

Colombian businessman (born 1971)

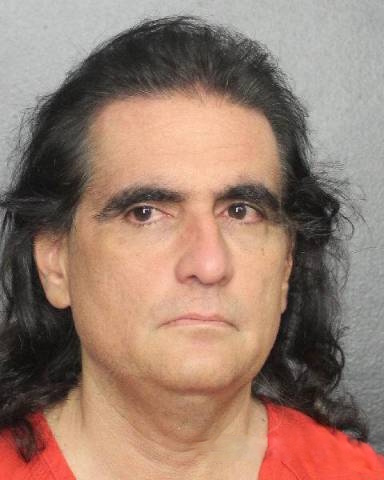
- Mugshot of Saab in 2021

Minister of Industry and National Production
- In office 18 October 2024 – 16 January 2026
- President: Nicolás Maduro
- Preceded by: Pedro Tellechea
- Succeeded by: Luis Antonio Villegas Ramírez

Personal details
- Born: Alex Nain Saab Morán; December 21, 1971 (age 54) Barranquilla, Atlántico, Colombia
- Citizenship: (Colombia) Colombian (at birth) (Antigua and Barbuda) Antiguan (since 2014) (Venezuela) Venezuelan (2020−2026)
- Occupation: Businessman, politician
- Known for: Close relationship with the Venezuelan government of Hugo Chávez and Nicolás Maduro

Alex Nain Saab Morán (born 21 December 1971) is a Colombian businessman who served as Venezuela’s Minister of Industry and National Production from October 2024 to January 2026.

Saab was the subject of journalistic investigations for conducting businesses estimated at US$135 million with the Venezuelan government, while other Colombian businessmen had stopped exporting to Venezuela due to uncertainty regarding payments and tight exchange controls. Saab's name has appeared in multiple ICIJ leaks including the Panama Papers, Pandora Papers and the FinCEN Files.

Saab was enriched by the materials supplier business of the Housing Mission in Venezuela. Armando.Info, a Venezuelan investigative journalist outlet, reported that Saab received US$159 million from the Venezuelan government to import housing materials between 2012 and 2013, but only delivered products worth US$3 million. He later sold food to Venezuela for more than US$200 million in a contract signed by President Nicolás Maduro. The food was later resold in Venezuela for 112% more than its original price.

Saab has been investigated by Colombian authorities for allegedly laundering US$25 million between 2004 and 2011. On 8 May 2019, the Office of the Attorney General of Colombia indicted Saab with charges of money laundering, concert to commit crimes, illicit enrichment, fictitious exports and imports, and aggravated fraud for events related to his Shatex company. During the course of these investigations, his accounting auditors were arrested and charged by the prosecutor's office. Both Saab and his accountant were acquitted of the Colombian charges in May 2024.

During a fuel stop at Cape Verde, Alex Saab was arrested while on his way from Venezuela to Iran on a business jet on 12 June 2020. Saab was arrested in accordance to an Interpol red notice in relation to his indictment in the United States, accused of money laundering. Saab's extradition to the United States was approved by the Barlovento Appeals Tribunal, Cape Verde's Supreme Court of Justice and its Constitutional Court.

The Venezuelan government denied or ignored any relationship with Saab for years, but after his arrest in Cape Verde it started deploying a support campaign in favour of Saab and to prevent his extradition, using government social media accounts and filling Caracas with billboards, murals and graffitis asking for his release, organizing demonstrations in his support, and starting a YouTube series about him.

He was extradited to the United States on 16 October 2021 and charged with eight counts of money laundering, accused of moving $350 million out of Venezuela into accounts controlled in the United States and other countries, as well as falsifying documents to obtain contracts for the construction of affordable housing. He faced up to twenty years in US prison. Maduro's government suspended negotiation talks with the political opposition as a response. According to court documents released in 2022, Saab became a U.S. Drug Enforcement Administration (DEA) informant in 2018, during which time he shared information about the bribes that he offered to Venezuelan officials and contracts with the government.

In December 2023, Saab was released from jail to be sent back to Venezuela in exchange for ten American prisoners being held in Venezuela in a prisoner exchange. Saab was arrested in February 2026 in a joint operation by American and Venezuelan intelligence agencies after the United States strikes in Venezuela and capture of Nicolás Maduro. In May 2026, he was deported to the US.

== Career ==
Alex Saab is the son of a Lebanese immigrant, Luis, who settled in the city of Barranquilla and opened various businesses, including Textiles Saab, finding success in Colombia's textile industry. Alex Saab attended the German School of Barranquilla, an elite private school.

Saab began his career in Barranquilla at age 18, selling business promotional keychains and subsequently work uniforms. By the time he was 19, he had opened a T-shirt factory.

In early 2000, he formed a network of export organisations with family members listed as officers. Saab joined a group of Colombian businessmen who were exporting merchandise to Colombia from Venezuela using the CADIVI currency system. According to a Univisión source, during this time Saab accumulated million dollar debts after the suspension of foreign exchange payments by the Venezuelan government, which in turn alleged that some businessmen in the country had cheated millions from the Cadivi system, although Saab was not accused of such fraud. Saab sued Univisión's journalist Gerardo Reyes in the US after Reyes reported on these issues.

According to an investigation by Noticias Caracol, businessman César Ruiz Sandoval was a key player in Saab's network starting from 2008 and would reportedly receive financial compensation from companies linked to Saab, up to 260 million pesos from HSC Capital, Golden Sun Trading de Colombia, Promotora Dubera and other companies. Ruiz owned a company named Marmocol de Colombia that would later be called Criadero Porcino Casa Blanca which had a Saab company among its commercial references, Shatex. Ruiz is also named as a founder and as a shareholder of Soft Solutions (later named Intratex International), along with other partners of Alex Saab. César Ruiz was killed on 4 June 2022 and the Office of the Attorney General of Colombia would open an investigation on his murder.

Saab was also enriched due to the materials supplier business of the Housing Mission in Venezuela. According to the Organized Crime and Corruption Reporting Project (OCCRP), in 2009 Saab and his business partner Álvaro Pulido won "an overvalued government contract to build 25,000 units of low-income housing for three or four-times the worth of the original construction cost." From 2011, Saab worked with Maduro's stepsons, Walter, Yosser and Yoswal, known as Los Chamos, because of their access to Maduro and former Vice President Tareck El Aissami, to secure government contracts.

On 28 November 2011, Saab's Bogota-based company Fondo Global de Construccion (Global Construction Fund) signed an agreement with the Venezuelan government, which resulted in a contract of US$685 million for the construction of prefabricated homes in Venezuela as part of la Gran Misión Vivienda housing programme, The signing was attended by presidents Juan Manuel Santos and Hugo Chávez, and Venezuela's then Foreign Minister Nicolás Maduro. Saab's lawyer, Abelardo de la Espriella, said that Saab had no connection with the Global Construction Fund. Armando.Info, a Venezuelan investigative journalist outlet, reported that Saab received US$159 million from the Venezuelan government to import housing materials between 2012 and 2013, but only delivered products worth US$3 million. The company was investigated by Ecuador's government for alleged money laundering through false exports to Venezuela via Colombia; although Saab was not accused of wrongdoing, in 2013 Ecuadorian prosecutors alleged the company was used to launder more than $130 million, but the case was dropped after several years. A parallel investigation by Colombia's customs agency was dropped in 2014 when the investigator resigned and moved abroad due to death threats.

On 18 November 2014, Antigua and Barbuda's prime minister Gaston Browne invited Saab to become special economic envoy to Venezuela, granting him Antiguan citizenship. He had a contract to build a factory in Antigua to make housing panels, but the factory never opened.

Saab used the services of Mossack Fonseca, the legal firm at the center of the Panama Papers offshore financing scandal, to create companies abroad. Among these were Seafire Foundation, Lintel Overseas and PI Proment International Sociedad Anónima Kingstone Team Inc. Saab's lawyer said none of these companies were ever used. Among the companies there also was Group Grand Limited, of which Saab was co-owner of and was used to supply food to the Local Committees for Supply and Production (CLAP) programme.

In August 2015, a tiny trucking and trading firm, Trenaco, headquartered in Switzerland but largely run out of Colombia, won a contract from Petroleos de Venezuela SA (PDVSA), worth around $4.5 billion, for a drilling project in the Orinoco Belt, the world's largest crude oil reserve. After complaints from PDVSA's foreign partners, including Chevron and Rosneft, the deal collapsed by the start of 2016. Trenaco executives told Reuters that Saab had run the company since 2012–14. The company shared an address with Fondo Global, and executives said Saab worked alongside Carlos Gutiérrez, the son of a Colombian agricultural magnate, and Colombian businessman Alvaro Pulido.

In 2019, Saab launched two legal cases in Miami against the Univision TV network for its reporting of his businesses. By 2020, Saab had moved his base of operations to Turkey.

=== Local Committees for Supply and Production (CLAP) ===
The Local Committees for Supply and Production (CLAP) programme, established in 2016, imports food for the poor in Venezuela in the context of the country's food shortages. Saab had sold food to Venezuela for more than US$200 million in a contract signed by President Nicolás Maduro through a registered company in Hong Kong. On 23 August 2017, the former Venezuelan attorney general, Luisa Ortega Díaz, said Alex Saab was the co-owner of the Mexican firm supplying food to CLAP, Group Grand Limited, along with Álvaro Pulido and Rofolfo Reyes, who Ortega claimed was "presumably President Nicolás Maduro". The food supplies have been sold through Group Grand Limited for 112% more than the original price in Mexico. Saab would have met Pulido in 2012, when he was dedicated to supplying the Saab company, but this activity would have stopped doing it in 2014.

In 2018, the Venezuela government began paying for the CLAP imports using its gold resources. The US Treasury said the government was pressuring miners to sell Saab gold at an inflated market rate. "The gold would be flown to the United Arab Emirates and Turkey. Saab's company, Mulberry, based in Turkey, allegedly would help facilitate payments for the selling of gold and goods back to Venezuelan clients."

==== Armando.info investigation ====
In April and September 2017 four investigative journalists published reports in Venezuelan web portal Armando.info about inflated food prices within the CLAP initiative, exposing Saab's relationship with the Venezuelan government. The first report showed Saab's connections to Hong Kong-based Grupo Grand (including the listing of his son as a beneficiary and the company sharing an address with another of Saab's enterprises; Saab rejected the allegations) and that it charged the Venezuelan government prices far above the market rate. The second report investigated Luisa Ortega's allegations about the CLAP programme. A joint report between the Central University of Venezuela and Armando.info showed that milk powder supplied by Saab's company was not nutritious, having high levels of sodium, low levels of calcium and only 1/41 the protein of normal milk.

Following the publication, Armando.info and the journalists were threatened and had their personal information shared on social media, and Saab brought a lawsuit alleging continued defamation of reputation and aggravated injury charges, which carry a prison sentence of up to six years, leading the reporters to flee Venezuela.

On 11 September 2018, the National Commission of Telecommunications (CONATEL) of Venezuela banned the Armando.info journalists from publishing information about Saab. In a document addressed to the journalist Roberto Deniz and signed by the general director of CONATEL, Vianey Miguel Rojas "forbids citizens Roberto Denis Machín, Joseph Poliszuk, Ewald Scharfenberg and Alfredo José Meza to publish and disseminate mentions that go against the honor and reputation of the citizen Alex Naím Saab" through digital media, specifically on the site Armando.info, "until the end of the current process in the case being pursued against said citizens". The ban was denounced by the Venezuelan National Press Workers' Union (SNTP). Since the reports, the Armando.Info site suffered massive cyber attacks, warning that the ban on mentioning Saab in successive investigation articles "increases the threat". Roberto Deniz rejected the sentence, recalling that after the publications the journalistic team had been threatened via Twitter and banned from leaving the country by the 11th Court in Caracas.

==== Operación Alacrán ====
On 1 December 2019, Armando.info published an investigation reporting that nine members of Venezuela's opposition-controlled National Assembly (see 2017 Venezuelan constitutional crisis) intervened in Saab and Carlos Lizcano, another businessman linked with the government and the CLAP program. The investigation reported that the implicated lawmakers had written letters of support to the United States Treasury and others to Lizcano, who authorities were investigating over his possible links to Saab. According to Armando.info, the lawmakers wrote the letters despite being aware of evidence that tied Lizcano to Saab. In addition, the portal pointed to José Brito as implicated in alleged acts of corruption to "cleanse the reputation" of Colombian businessmen linked to the Maduro government and the alleged network of embezzlement of CLAP social assistance funds.

==== Swiss investigation ====
In September 2020 authorities in Liechtenstein started investigating Alex Saab on embezzlement charges related to CLAP public funds, sending a request for assistance to Switzerland. On 14 September, United States authorities froze accounts in Liechtenstein belonging to Saab worth US$700 million.

==== Gerardo Reyes' book about Saab ====
Colombian journalist Gerardo Reyes, Pulitzer Prize recipient and Univisión's investigation team director, published in 2021 his book Alex Saab with the Editorial Planeta, based on 120 interviews. Reyes described Saab as a "super minister", saying that he had more tasks than any other member of Maduro's cabinet, and has written that the United States calculates that Saab's profits from the Venezuelan government are over a billion dollars.

== Criminal investigations and arrest ==
=== DEA investigation and the FinCEN files ===
In 2016, Reuters reported that the U.S. Drug Enforcement Administration (DEA) had been investigating companies owned by Saab and Álvaro Pulido on suspicion of money laundering from the illegal trafficking of cocaine from Colombia. The FinCEN Files, published by the International Consortium of Investigative Journalists in 2020, revealed that from 2016 onwards banks had reported Saab to the U.S. Treasury's FinCEN financial crimes bureau for suspicious transactions from the Global Bank of Commerce in Antigua.

=== 2018 foiled arrest operation ===
The Colombian Prosecution and the Directorate of Criminal Investigation and Interpol (DIJIN) issued arrest warrants on 24 September 2018 against seven people, including Alex Saab, charged with asset laundering worth US$25 billion between 2004 and 2011, and planned to carry out an operation the following day. However, the operation was foiled after Eddie Andrés Pinto, a patrolman of the DIJIN who served as an interception analyst, alerted several members of the group about their arrests. As a response, Alex Saab escaped to Venezuela and his brothers, Luis Alberto and Amir, disconnected their cellphones and the authorities lost their track. After an investigation, a tip by an anonymous informant and an extortion complaint filed by a trusted person by Saab, the Colombian authorities identified Andrés Pinto as responsible; on 11 October he was arrested in Bogotá and indicted by the Prosecution with bribery and illegal violation of communications or correspondence of an official nature. Pinto announced his intention to collaborate with the authorities. At the moment it was unknown if the indicted group and Saab contacted the DIJIN to leak information regarding the operation or if they were subject of extortion, and the Prosecution was evaluating if Pinto received benefits in exchange of the provided information. On 23 September 2018, one of Saab's lawyers filed a complaint with the prosecution for attempted extortion from a public official "who is providing confidential information about investigative proceedings against the Saab family using WhatsApp and Telegram messages, in exchange for some economic or labor purpose.” On 12 October, Andrés Pinto accepted the extortion charges that were indicted against him. According to the complaint in the audios and WhatsApp captures provided therein, Pinto requested COP 500 million in exchange for erasing all the information that existed on behalf of Saab, stating that "there was nothing that compromised Saab or his family", but that they "were going to be captured as a measure of pressure".

=== Colombian, US and Swiss criminal charges ===
On 8 May 2019, the Colombian prosecutors office charged Saab with crimes of money laundering, a concert to commit crimes, illicit enrichment, exports and fictitious imports and an aggravated fraud for events related to his Shatex company. Since September 2018, he is considered a fugitive in Colombia for failing to attend any judicial proceeding even with a firm arrest warrant. Saab was found not guity of the Colombian charges in May 2024.

On 25 July 2019, the U.S. Attorney's Office for the Southern District of Florida charged Saab and Pulido with money laundering of up US$350 million related to a 2011-15 scheme to pay bribes to take advantage of Venezuela's government-set exchange rate.

In March 2021, after three years of investigation, Swiss prosecutors concluded that there was insufficient evidence to prosecute Saab for money laundering.

==== Meetings with U.S. officials ====
In November 2021 court records in the U.S. court case of an alleged ex-associate of Saab Bruce Bagley, (who has pled guilty to Laundering about US$2.5 million in deposits from overseas accounts that were controlled by Saab) claimed that an intermediary (later identified by Bagley as Jorge Luis Hernández) told Bagley the $2.5 million he received from Saab was to pay lawyers who were assisting Saab with his cooperation with the U.S. government, who in meetings provided information on the Maduro government to U.S. authorities. David Rivkin, one of Saab's attorneys, said Saab had not cooperated with American officials and the Venezuelan government were aware of all his activities. The meetings reportedly took place from 2017 until the U.S. money laundering charges were releveled in 2019.

=== Sanctions ===
On 25 July 2019, the United States Department of the Treasury imposed sanctions on 10 people and 13 companies (from Colombia, Hong Kong, Mexico, Panama, Turkey, the United Arab Emirates and the U.S.) in "CLAP", which includes Nicolas Maduro's stepsons and Saab. According to a statement by Treasury Secretary Steven Mnuchin, "The corruption network that operates the CLAP program has allowed Maduro and his family members to steal from the Venezuelan people. They use food as a form of social control, to reward political supporters and punish opponents, all the while pocketing hundreds of millions of dollars through a number of fraudulent schemes."

The Maduro government rejected the sanctions, calling it sign of "desperation" by "the gringo empire." Maduro said "Imperialists, prepare for more defeats, because the CLAP in Venezuela will continue, no one takes the CLAP away from the people." A statement from the Venezuelan foreign ministry "denounces the repeated practice of economic terrorism by the US government against the Venezuelan people, announcing measures whose criminal purpose is to deprive all Venezuelans of their right to food."

According to Armando.Info, as a result of US investigations and sanctions, Saab moved his shell companies to Turkey.

In July 2021, the United Kingdom issued a series of sanctions that included Saab, which included the freezing of assets and travel bans. Álvaro Enrique Pulido, identified as Saab's associate, was also sanctioned, in both cases for ""exploiting two of Venezuela's public programs that were established to provide poor Venezuelans with affordable food and housing", saying that "They both benefited from improperly awarded contracts, in which promised goods were delivered at highly inflated prices. Their actions caused more suffering to Venezuelans who were already in poverty for their own private enrichment."

=== First arrest ===
==== 2020 detention ====
On 12 June 2020, en route from Venezuela to Iran on a business jet, Alex Saab was arrested during a fuel stop at Cape Verde. Saab was arrested in accordance to an Interpol red notice in relation to his indictment for money laundering in the United States. The Venezuelan government stated the red notice had been issued a day after Saab was detained. Venezuela's foreign ministry said the Venezuelan government had employed Saab to obtain food, medicine and other humanitarian goods to help Venezuela combat the COVID-19 pandemic. After his arrest, Venezuela said Saab was a Venezuelan diplomat who was on a humanitarian mission to Iran to organise the exchange of Venezuelan gold for Iranian gasoline, an argument rejected by Cape Verde's Barlavento Court of Appeal. While no extradition treaty exists between Cape Verde and the U.S., legal experts have argued that Cape Verde is part of United Nations conventions that compel the country to comply with an Interpol red notice, regardless of the date when it was issued.

The US deployed the Navy cruiser USS San Jacinto off Cape Verde from November to December 2020, on a secret mission to "deter Venezuela and Iran from plotting to spirit Mr. Saab away from the island". The New York Times reported that "hard-liners at the Justice and State Departments, including Elliott Abrams, the State Department's special envoy for Iran and Venezuela" were worried that Iranian or Venezuelan operatives could help Saab escape and that the US would "lose an unusual opportunity to punish Mr. Maduro".

Saab said in a June 2021 CNN interview that he had been tortured by the authorities in Cape Verde.

In August 2020, Saab asked Cape Verde's Prime Minister, Ulisses Correia e Silva, to release him. The Russian government criticised the detention of Saab and the extradition request.

Saab's wife, Italian model Camila Fabbri, moved to Moscow with her family in early 2021.

==== Support campaign ====
Shortly after his detention, on 13 June, the foreign affairs minister appointed by Maduro, Jorge Arreaza, tweeted in support of Alex Saab, labeling his arrest as "arbitrary" and "illegal". Journalist Roberto Deniz expressed surprise by the declaration, saying that after years denying or ignoring its relationship with Saab, the government now called him a "government agent" and a "Venezuelan citizen".

After Alex Saab's detention, the Venezuelan government started deploying a support campaign in favour of Saab, using government social media accounts and filling Caracas with billboards, murals and graffitis to ask for his liberation. The government designed a communication campaign to build an alternative narrative of Saab's affair, showing him as an ally entrepreneur with diplomatic powers that with his efforts had managed to evade economic sanctions and made possible the arrival of food and industrial parts to Venezuela. In February 2021, the Venezuelan government organized a concert in support of Alex Saab in Caracas' Diego Ibarra Square, asking for his release. Two ruling party deputies visited Nigeria's embassy in Venezuela, also asking for his liberation.

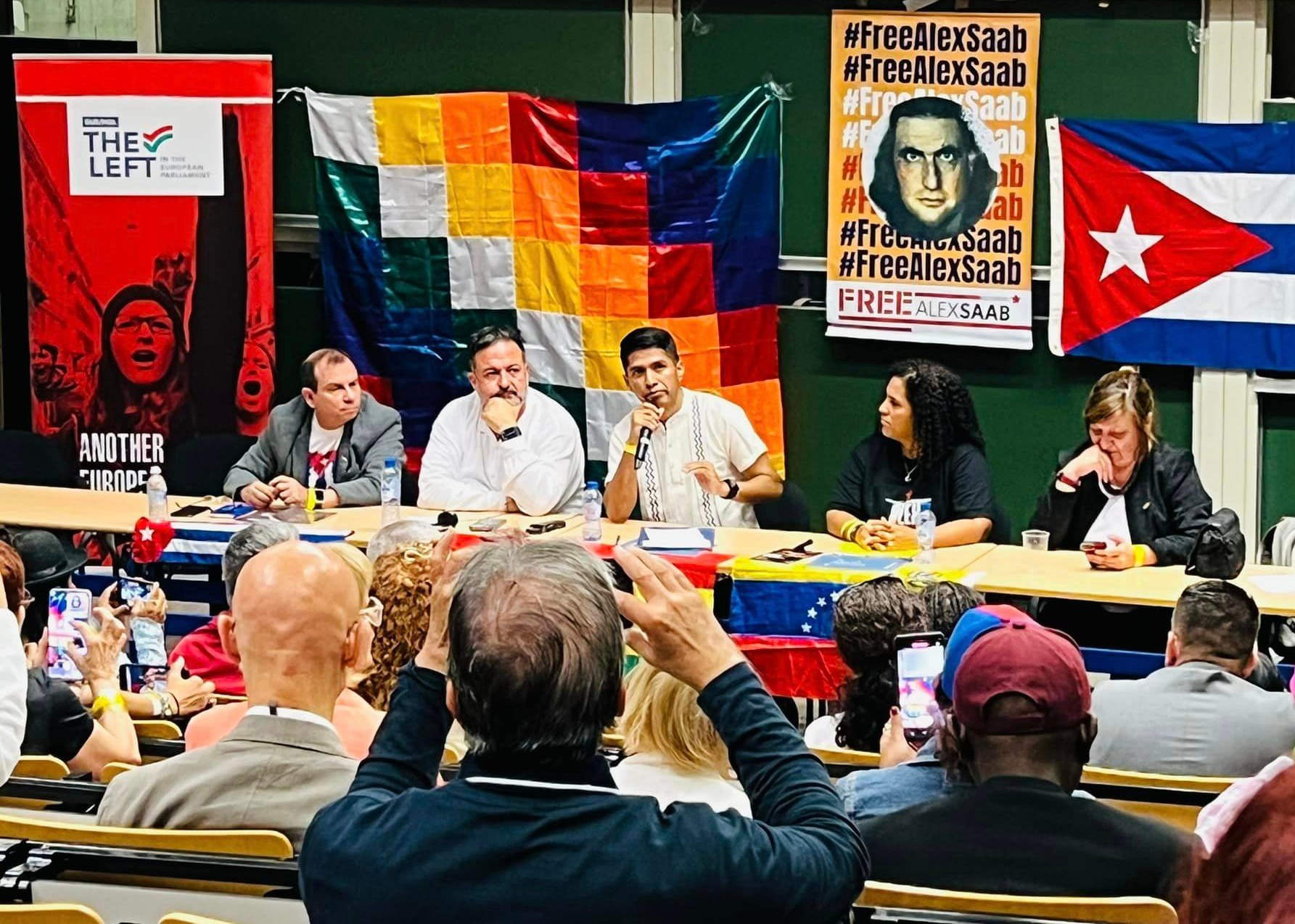
#FreeAlexSaab poster at a summit of Latin American political leaders in Belgium.

The same month, employees of Salva Foods, which operates in La Guaira Port and imports and assembles CLAP boxes, said that they were threatened by the company's board with massive layoffs and labor benefits removal if they refused to participate in videos or protests to demand the release of Saab, who is connected to the company.

On 25 August 2020, the Attorney General of Cape Verde opened an investigation into two men who posed as representatives of the Cape Verde government and travelled to Venezuela to discuss Saab's case with President Maduro.

An intelligence report accessed by the Financial Times in early 2021 analysed more than half a million Twitter posts related to Alex Saab and concluded that Nicolás Maduro's administration "and/or its proxies (witting or unwitting) are involved in a coordinated campaign to influence both the government of Cape Verde and its population to obstruct Alex Saab's extradition".

As a response to a BuzzFeed News and the Digital Africa Research Lab (DigiAfricaLab) investigation, Twitter suspended over 1,500 accounts in April 2021 for manipulating the #FreeAlexSaab hashtag, a hashtag used since mid-January as part of a campaign by a Nigerian public relations firm and a United Kingdom-based nonprofit called Digital Good Governance for Africa that paid influencers to tweet about Saab in an effort to sway public opinion and court proceedings in Nigeria and Cape Verde.

In June 2021, the platform Cazadores de Fake News concluded that a marketing company called PromoCoreGH was leading an astroturfing campaign in Ghana in support of Saab, after analyzing 151,725 tweets and fifty Twitter accounts.

In June 2021, the Venezuelan government started a YouTube series dedicated to Saab. On 17 October 2021 it organized a demonstration in support of Saab.

Code Pink started collecting signatures to ask for Saab's release in October 2021.

==== Extradition process and legal battle, 2020-21 ====
The Madrid-based law firm of former Spanish judge Baltasar Garzón will represent Alex Saab in the extradition case. Saab's defense team said that Saab "is the key figure for the U.S. in their plan to overthrow Nicolás Maduro and keep suffocating the Venezuelan people" and that Saab was on a mission to Iran as a special envoy of Maduro to negotiate fuel and humanitarian supplies at the time of his arrest.

On 30 November 2020, the Economic Community of West African States (ECOWAS) Court of Justice ordered Cape Verde to grant house arrest to Alex Saab. On 15 December, the Cape Verde Court of Appeals ruled to refuse the decision, arguing that ECOWAS Court lacks the jurisdiction to force Cape Verde to take decisions. Cape Verde also asked the ECOWAS Court to rescind the decision.

On 29 December, Nicolás Maduro appointed Alex Saab as ambassador to the African Union, seeking to send Saab to Ethiopia and to prevent his extradition.

On 5 January 2021, the Cape Verde Court of Appeals ruled in favor of Alex Saab's extradition. On 21 January, authorities of Cape Verde announced that his transfer to house arrest was approved. Experts consulted by Voice of America declared that after the decision, the risk of his escape increased "exponentially".

On 22 February 2021, the United States District Court for the Southern District of Florida denied a request to cancel Saab's extradition request to the United States.

On 15 March 2021, the ECOWAS Court of Justice ruled against Saab's extradition and ordered that he be freed because he was detained before the Interpol Red Notice was issued. It ordered Cape Verde to pay Saab 200,000 euros in compensation. Decisions of the Court of Justice are binding, but the court does not have the authority to enforce its judgements in member states, including Cape Verde. On 17 March, Cape Verde's Supreme Tribunal approved Saab's extradition request. Cape Verde later asked the ECOWAS to nullify the decision in favor of Alex Saab.

By March 2021, Saab's legal defense was estimated to have cost $170 million.

In June 2021, the United Nations Human Rights Committee asked Cape Verde to suspend Saab's extradition and to ensure he has access to specialised medical care chosen by him. The committee said it wanted time to analyse Saab's case. Cape Verde's Supreme Tribunal rejected the UN committee's request in a 39 pages-long decision, ruling that "Cape Verde is not forced to comply with the request" and that "sufficiently persuasive reasons to justify its reception do not exist". The Tribunal's three judges considered that the requests to the different Member States of the committee "are part of a constructive dialogue" that does not imply "any relationship of subordination", but rather of "complementarity", writing in the ruling that "This body presents its interpretation, which the State considers and responds if it freely deems it necessary to diverge with them". The justices also suggested that the committee did not have knowledge about Saab's record. In response, Saab's lawyer said the court had made a legal, strategic, and ethical mistake and was "send[ing] a clear message to the world that it can exercise its sovereignty to violate human rights while ignoring the norms of international human rights law to which it has subscribed".

On 6 August 2021, the United States Court of Appeals for the Eleventh Circuit agreed to hear an appeal by Saab's defence team, which was seeking to have the US courts recognise his diplomatic immunity. The US was required to lodge a response within 30 days.

The Constitutional Court of Cape Verde heard the parties on 13 August 2021, after Alex Saab's lawyers appealed the decision of the country's Supreme Court of Justice to authorize his extradition to the United States.

Ruling of the Constitutional Tribunal of Cape Verde on 7 September 2021 approving Alex Saab's extradition

In August 2021, Saab's defence team asked that the site of his detention be moved from the island of Sal to Praia. It said Saab's health had deteriorated and that he needed access to specialist medical care for his cancer. On 1 September 2021, the Barlavento Court of Appeal granted Saab's request. Saab's defence team asked the Cape Verde courts to refuse Saab's extradition on the grounds that there were legal irregularities associated with his arrest. By September 2021, the request had reached the Cape Verde Constitutional Court.

On 8 September 2021 the Constitutional Tribunal of Cape Verde rejected Saab's defence appeal and approved Saab's extradition to the United States on money laundering charges. The 194 page ruling agreed with the decision of two lower courts, the Barlovento Appeals Tribunal and the Supreme Tribunal of Justice, who had authorized the extradition in 2020 and March 2021, respectively, as well as supported the position of Cape Verde's government.

On 14 September 2021, Jorge Rodríguez, head of the Venezuelan government's delegation to talks with the Venezuelan opposition mediated by Norway taking place in Mexico, declared that Saab had been appointed a member of the government's negotiation team.

Saab was extradited to the United States on 16 October 2021 and charged with eight counts of money laundering, accused of moving $350 million out of Venezuela into accounts controlled in the United States and other countries, as well as falsifying documents to obtain contracts for the construction of affordable housing, facing up to twenty years in prison. Saab pleaded not guilty to the charges.

After the extradition, the Venezuelan government pulled out of the Mexico talks in protest, having made Saab's participation in the official team a condition of the negotiations.

=== Trial ===
Prosecutors requested that seven of the initial eight July 2019 indictment charges be dropped to comply with assurances to the Cape Verde government in seeking Saab's extradition, who were promised that Saab would only be charged on a single count to comply with Cape Verde's laws regarding the maximum imprisonment term. Following the request, on 1 November 2021, American Judge Robert Scola dismissed seven out of eight money laundering charges against Saab.

According to judicial documents published on 16 February 2022, Saab became a DEA informant in 2018, during which time he shared information with the United States justice system about the bribes that he offered to Venezuelan officials, his illicit activities and contracts with the Venezuelan government, planning to turn himself in. According to the documents, Saab met with American authorities between August 2016 and June 2019, and signed a cooperation agreement with the DEA in 2018. The documents also mentioned how in another meeting in June 2018 Saab admitted paying bribes related to food supply contracts. The documents state that, as part of the cooperation agreement with the American authorities, Saab wired over $10 million obtained through said operations to the DEA and held several meetings with agents and prosecutors in Colombia and Europe. According to prosecutors, the United States stopped considering him as a collaborator after Saab missed a 30 May 2019 deadline set for him to turn himself in and face charges in Florida.

In the hearing where the documents were revealed, one of Saab's defense lawyers, Neil Schuster, pleaded with Judge Scola that the information be kept secret, fearing that the physical safety of Saab's family in Venezuela could be put at risk if the Maduro government learned about it. When the documents were presented in 2021, the prosecution also requested them be kept private because at the time it thought it would be risky for him and his family for the details of the collaboration to be known in Venezuela. However, during this hearing, prosecutors stated that it was time for them to be made public and downplayed any dangers, saying that Saab's legal team had not taken them up on an offer to assist his family in leaving Venezuela. Scola agreed, stating that the documents could not be kept secret indefinitely and that the access to criminal processes public's right outweighed the concerns about the dangers to his family. He also said the court had not heard valid arguments to support the claim that disclosure of the documents would endanger Saab's family in Venezuela, after nearly a year.

Another of Saab's lawyers that sought that the Court of Appeals for the Eleventh Circuit ruled in favor of diplomatic immunity, David B. Rivkin, rejected that Saab cooperated. Rivkin said that the only purpose of Saab's meetings with US officials was to "confirm that neither he nor any company related to him had done anything wrong" and that the meetings were held with the "full knowledge and support" of the Maduro government. Rivkin also said that the release of the documents were an attempt to harm Venezuela and its relationship with Saab, and that it showed that the government's case was weak. Camilla Fabri, Saab's wife, also rejected on Twitter that cooperation took place, declared that the U.S. was "brazenly lying, like it did with Russia and Iraq" and that her husband "would never harm Venezuela".

Schuster asked the judge to release Saab on bail following his cooperation with the U.S. government. Scola rejected the request, citing Saab's attempts to avoid extradition, among other reasons. The judge set the date for the next hearing for 11 October.

Pardon issued by Joe Biden to Alex Saab

On 7 November, prosecutors presented documents casting doubt on defense evidence to argue that Saab, showing a printed copy of the Official Gazette of Venezuela edition No. 6,373 from 26 April 2018 obtained from the United States Library of Congress that contradicted an electronic version introduced by the defense reportedly showing that by presidential decree Saab had been appointed special envoy. They also introduced a copy of Saab's purported diplomatic passport with a picture and signature matching another, non-diplomatic passport issued nearly two years later. The prosecution argued that the documents suggested potential forgery, and that if Saab was indeed a special envoy, the Maduro administration would have immediately referred to Saab as such, which did not happen until months later, along with the existence of a supposed diplomatic passport.

==== Release ====
In December 2023, Saab was released from jail to be sent back to Venezuela in exchange for ten American prisoners being held in Venezuela in a prisoner exchange. President Joe Biden issued a pardon to Saab with the following conditions:

1. Alex Saab must leave the United States.
2. Saab shall thereafter remain outside the boundaries of the United States, its territories and possessions.
3. Alex Saab shall not commit any additional crimes against the United States or in violation of the laws of the United States after acceptance of the pardon.
4. Saab will waive and release any and all claims, demands, rights and causes of action of any kind and nature against the United States of America, its agents, servants and employees.
5. As an individual and on behalf of the entities he controlled or was the beneficial owner of, he will waive any and all future claims and challenges and relinquish any and all funds and property already seized or subject to forfeiture in the United States in connection with the prosecution of offenses subject to the pardon.
6. Saab will not accept or receive any financial benefit directly or indirectly, in any form, or amount, from any book, film or other publication or production, in any form or medium, about his situation.

Nicolás Maduro appointed Saab as president of the International Investment Centre of Venezuela after his return to Venezuela.

=== Second arrest ===
On February 4, 2026, Saab was arrested in Venezuela as part of a joint operation between American FBI and Venezuelan authorities. Saab was captured around 2 a.m. VET, and was under the custody of the Bolivarian National Intelligence Service while his extradition to the United States was being determined.

On May 16, Venezuela’s government announced the deportation of Saab to the US based on several ongoing criminal investigations there.

== Political career ==
Nicolás Maduro appointed him to the position of Minister of People's Power for Industry and National Production on 18 October 2024.

Venezuela’s interim leader Delcy Rodríguez on 16 January 2026 announced she had dismissed Alex Saab from his role as industry minister.

== See also ==
- Citgo Six
- Narcosobrinos affair
- Operation Money Badger
- United States v. Maduro et al.
