= Venezuelan Football Federation =

Governing body of football in Venezuela

CONMEBOL
- Founded: 1925; 101 years ago
- Headquarters: Caracas
- FIFA affiliation: 1937
- CONMEBOL affiliation: 1953
- President: Jorge Giménez
- Website: https://www.fvf.com.ve/

The Venezuelan Football Federation (Spanish: Federación Venezolana de Fútbol or FVF) is the governing body of football in Venezuela. It was founded in 1925 and affiliated in 1937. It is a member of CONMEBOL as well as FIFA, and is in charge of the Venezuela national football team.

== Copa America 2007 ==
Venezuela was selected as the host of the Copa América 2007. The FVF and CONMEBOL were responsible of many aspects of the organisation and logistics of the tournament.

== Association staff ==
| Name | Position | Source |
|---|---|---|
| (Venezuela) Jorge Giménez | President | |
| n/a | Vice President | |
| (Venezuela) David Quintanilla | General Secretary | |
| n/a | Treasurer | |
| (Venezuela) Luis Gimenez | Technical Director | |
| (Argentina) Fernando Batista | Team Coach (Men's) | |
| (Brazil) Ricardo Belli | Team Coach (Women's) | |
| (Argentina) Diego Cristaldo | Media/Communications Manager | |
| (Venezuela) Rafael Almarza | Futsal Coordinator | |
| (Venezuela) Leonardo Taricani | Referee Coordinator | |

== Executive Board ==
- President: Jorge Giménez Ochoa
- 1st Vice-President: Pedro Infante Aparicio
- 2nd Vice-President: Jose Antonio Quintero
- 3rd Vice-President: Akram Almatni
- Secretary: David Quintanilla
- Director: Suying Olivares
- Director: Oscar Linares
- Director: Juan Carlos Copa
- Director: Reina Suarez
- Director: Miguel Mea Vitali
- Director: Oscar Cunto
- Director: Adrian Aguirre
- Referee Board: Miguel Buitriago
- Honor Council: Consuelo Vasquez
- Electoral Commission: Edgar Morales
- Press Officer: Salomón Rondón
