= Luis Stefanelli =

Venezuelan politician (1957–2025)

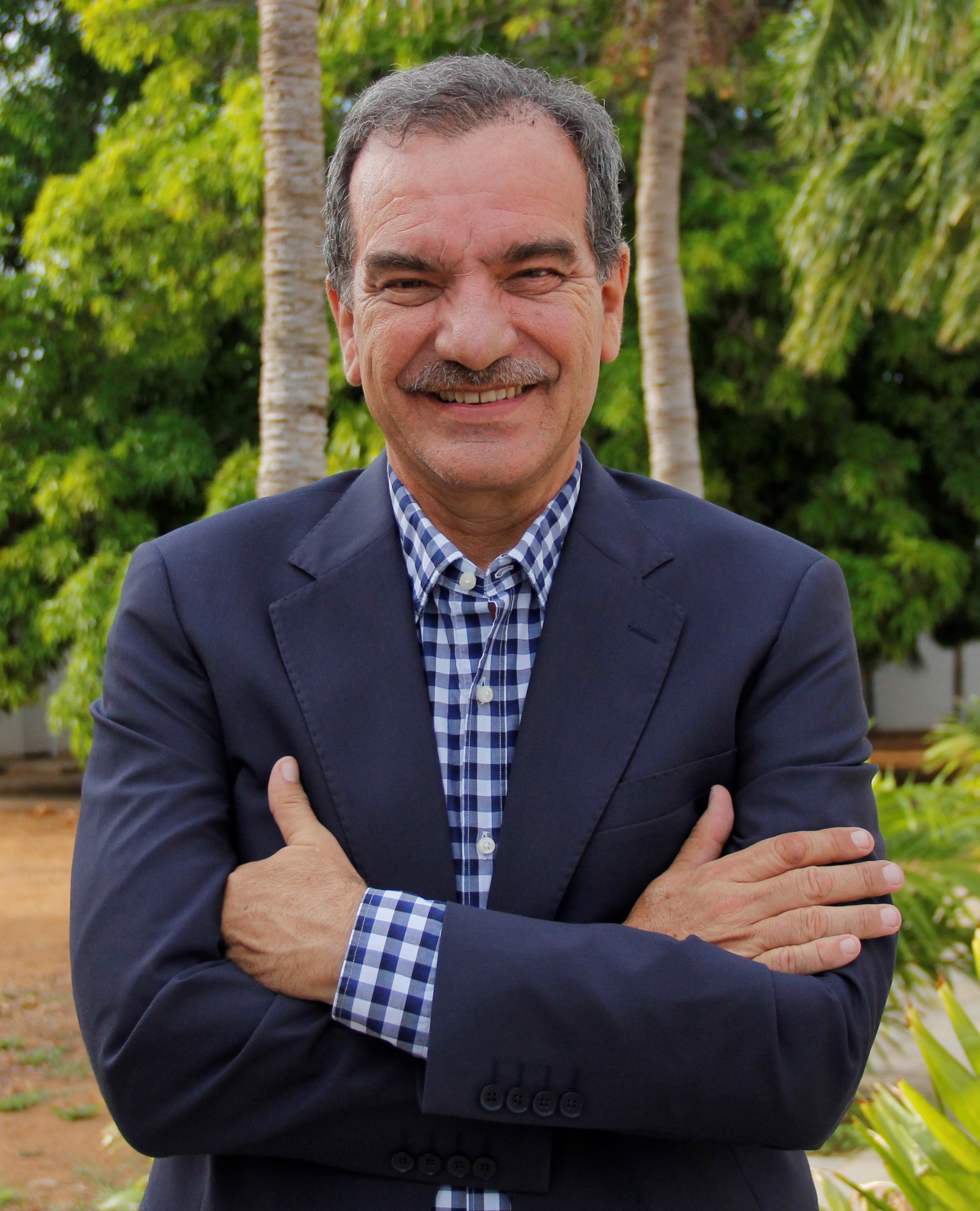
- Stefanelli in 2017

Member of the Chamber of Deputies of Venezuela
- In office 23 January 1994 – 23 January 1999

Member of the National Assembly of Venezuela
- In office 5 January 2016 – 16 December 2019

Personal details
- Born: Luis Stefanelli Barjacoba; 8 September 1957 Puerto Cabello, Carabobo, Venezuela
- Died: 2 October 2025 (aged 68) Caracas, Venezuela
- Party: Copei (until 2000); UNT (2006–2016); VP (2016–2025)
- Education: University of Carabobo
- Occupation: Engineer

Luis Stefanelli Barjacoba (8 September 1957 – 2 October 2025) was a Venezuelan politician. A member of Copei, Un Nuevo Tiempo, and Popular Will, he served in the Chamber of Deputies from 1994 to 1999 and in the National Assembly from 2016 to 2019.

Stefanelli died in Caracas on 2 October 2025, at the age of 68.
