= PDVAL =

Food supply network in Venezuela

Producción y Distribución Venezolana de Alimentos (PDVAL)
- Type: State-owned enterprise (Public)
- Industry: Food
- Founded: 2008-2013
- Headquarters: Venezuela
- Key people: Rafael Ramírez, President - Hugo Chávez
- Parent: Petróleos de Venezuela S.A.

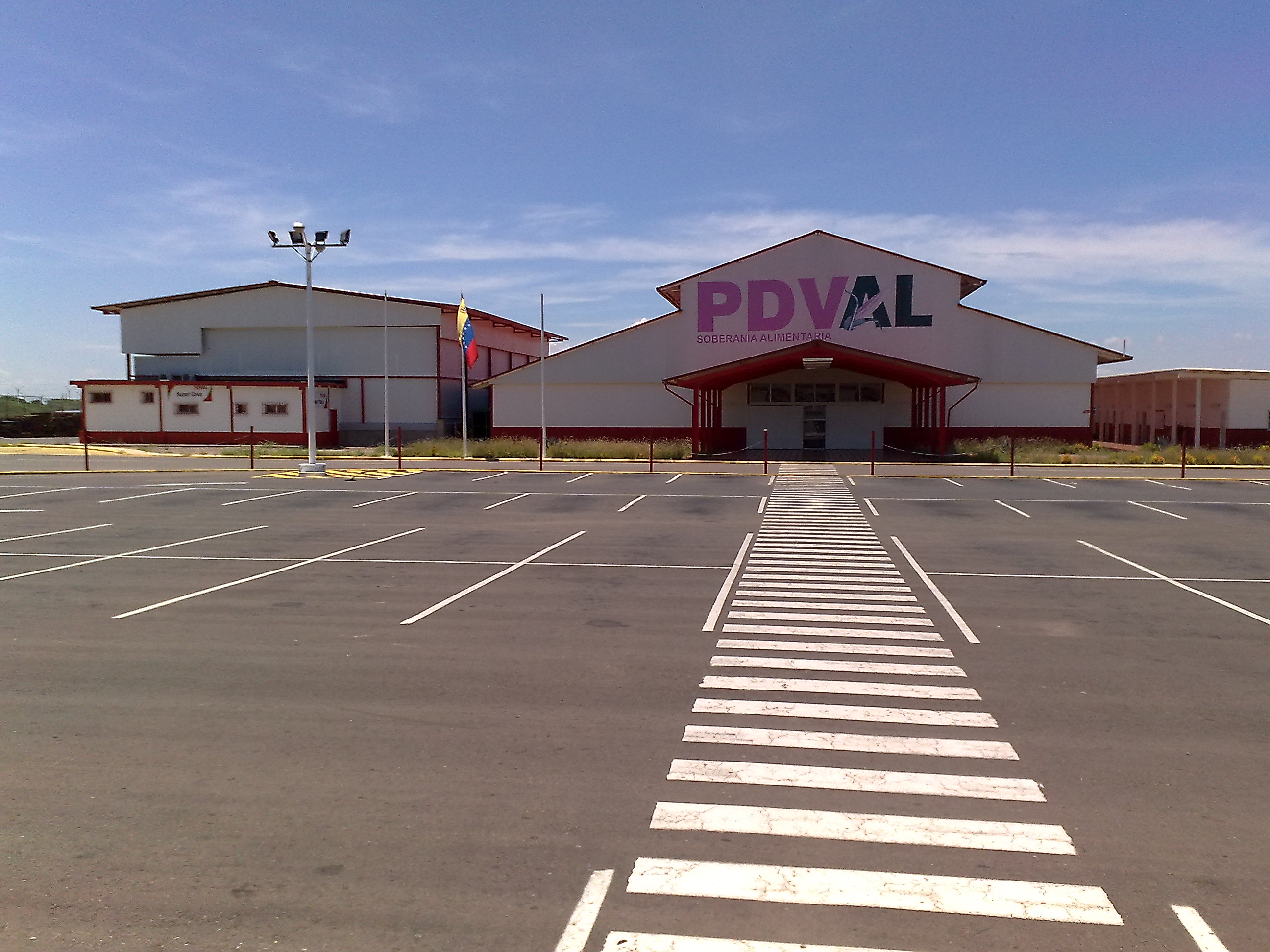
PDVAL food distributor.

Producción y Distribución Venezolana de Alimentos (PDVAL) is a nationwide food supply network in Venezuela. It was created by Venezuelan president Hugo Chávez and Petróleos de Venezuela (PDVSA) in response to the high food demand and presumed stockpiling by private food sectors, creating food shortage. Along with the related Mission Mercal, it was started following the Venezuelan general strike of 2002–2003, which saw concerns about corporate control of food distribution.

PDVAL's goal is to distribute basic goods such as meat, milk, chicken and other goods that have prices regulated by the government.

== Controversies ==
From June 2010, PDVAL started being administered by the Vicepresidency of Venezuela after the discovery of tons of decomposed food supplies around the country. Government opposition denounced the finding of thousands of containers with a total of 130.000 tons of decomposed supplies.
