= Censorship and media control during the Venezuelan presidential crisis =

There was censorship and media control during the Venezuelan presidential crisis between 2019 and January 2023.

A crisis concerning who was the legitimate president of Venezuela began on 10 January 2019, when the opposition-majority National Assembly declared that incumbent Nicolás Maduro's 2018 reelection was invalid and the body declared its president, Juan Guaidó, to be acting president of the nation. The process and results of the May 2018 Venezuelan presidential election were widely disputed. The National Assembly declared Maduro illegitimate on the day of his second inauguration, citing the 1999 Constitution of Venezuela enacted under Hugo Chávez, Maduro's predecessor; in response, the pro-Maduro Supreme Tribunal of Justice said the National Assembly's declaration was unconstitutional.

Maduro's government stated that the crisis was a "coup d'état led by the United States to topple him and control the country's oil reserves". Guaidó denied the coup allegations, saying peaceful volunteers backed his movement.

Since the beginning of the presidential crisis, Venezuela was exposed to frequent "information blackouts", periods without access to internet or other news services during important political events. The National Assembly and Guaido's speeches were regularly disrupted, television channels and radio programs were censored and many journalists were illegally detained. The Venezuelan press workers union reported that in 2019 40 journalists had been illegally detained as of 12 March. As of June 2019, journalists were denied access to seven sessions of the National Assembly by the National Guard.

Most Venezuelan television channels are controlled by the state, and information unfavorable to the government is not covered completely. Newspapers and magazines are scarce, as most are unable to afford paper to print. The underfunded web infrastructure has led to slow Internet connection speeds.

The information blackouts have promoted the creation of underground news coverage that is usually broadcast through social media and instant message services like WhatsApp. The dependence of Venezuelans on social media has also promoted the spread of disinformation and pro-Maduro propaganda.

Venezuela got the rank 148 of 180 in the World Press Freedom Index of Reporters Without Borders in 2019. The country went down five places since 2018.

The Inter-American Commission on Human Rights (IACHR) made a call to the Maduro administration to reestablish television and radio channels that had been closed, cease on the restrictions to Internet access, and protect the rights of journalists.

In 2022, pro-government deputy Jesús Faría admitted that the government blocked digital outlets.

== Internet, television, and radio ==
=== 2019 ===
Several sources reported that starting 12 January 2019 until 18 January, internet access to Wikipedia (in all languages) was blocked in Venezuela after Guaidó's page on the Spanish Wikipedia was edited to show him as president. The block mainly affected the users of the state-run CANTV, the national telecommunications company and largest provider of the country. Several media outlets have suggested that Wikipedia directly or indirectly was taking sides with either group.

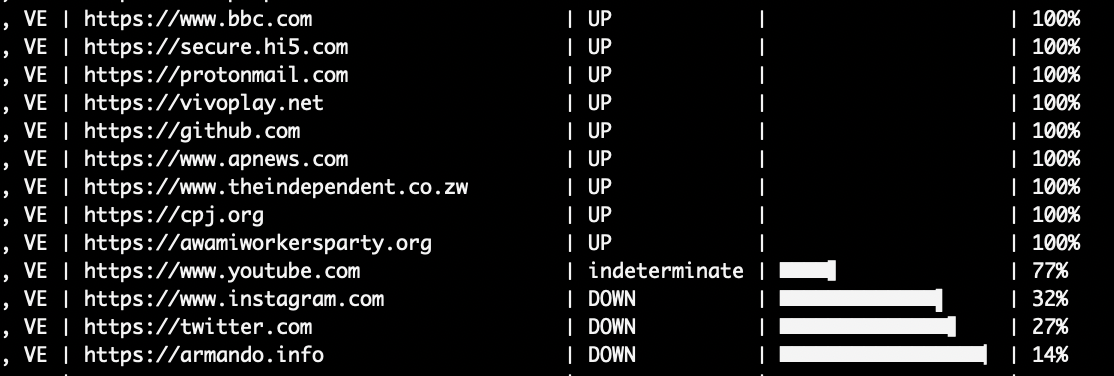
NetBlocks showing blocks of Instagram, Twitter, and YouTube on 21 January 2019

Later on 21 January, the day of a National Guard mutiny in Cotiza, internet access to some social media like Twitter, Instagram, and YouTube was reported blocked for CANTV users. The Venezuelan government denied it had engaged in blocking.

During the 23 January protests, widespread internet outages for CANTV users were reported, with Wikipedia, Google Search, Facebook, Instagram, and many other social media platforms affected. The widespread regional internet blackouts occurred again on 26 to 27 January.

Canal 24 Horas, a news channel owned by Chile's public broadcaster, TVN, was removed from Venezuela's cable and satellite television operators by the state-run National Commission of Telecommunications (Conatel) on 24 January. Conatel removed 24 Horas once again during the 23 February conflicts in the Venezuelan frontier, no reason was given.

Since 22 January, Conatel has repeatedly advised against the promotion of violence and the disavowing of institutional authorities, according to the Law on Social Responsibility on Radio and Television imposed in 2004. Some radio programs have been ordered off air, including Cesar Miguel Rondón's radio program, one of the most listened-to programs in the country. Other programs have been temporarily canceled or received censorship warnings, including a threat to close private television and radio stations if they recognize Guaidó as acting president or interim president of Venezuela.

During the Venezuela Aid Live concert on 22 February, NatGeo and Antena 3 Internacional were removed from cable and satellite TV for broadcasting the concert. Access to YouTube was also blocked for CANTV users during the concert.

Without clear reason, Twitter was blocked for CANTV users on 27 February, and again on 4 March, with Guaido's return from his regional trip. The access to SoundCloud was also restricted all along between both dates. NetBlocks suspects that the first censorship on the 27th was related either to a SoundCloud recording published by Guaidó on Twitter or to a viral video showing several delegates leaving the UN Human Rights Council meeting during Jorge Arreaza speech. Soundcloud access was restricted during the following 3 months.

Without any official statement from Conatel, the German state owned TV channel, Deutsche Welle (DW) in Spanish, was blocked from Venezuelan cable networks from 14 to 15 April. Conatel had already censored the DW signal once before in 2018 during the broadcast of a documentary titled "Venezuela—Escape from a Failed State".

During the 2019 Venezuelan uprising of 30 April, Juan Guaidó led a group of civilian and military forces in an uprising against Nicolás Maduro. Shortly after the announcement, NetBlocks reported that multiple social media and news websites were censored by the state-run CANTV internet provider. Internet service was restored 20 minutes before a live speech of Nicolás Maduro. During the clashes, the signal of BBC World News and CNN was pulled off air from all cable providers ordered by Conatel. According to CNN, it was blocked one minute after its live feed showed government VN-4s running over protesters. Venezuela's oldest private local radio station Radio Caracas Radio (RCR) was also ordered off air. Broadcast issues and internet disruptions followed during the protests of 1 May.

"The closing of media as a punishment for maintaining a critical editorial line, as well as the blocking of signals to avoid access to information of public interest, arbitrarily suppresses the right of all Venezuelans to express themselves and receive plural information, and it also constitutes a form of censorship"

— Edison Lanza, Special Rapporteur for Freedom of Expression of the IACHR, after the 30 April uprising,

The IACHR communication expressed that "freedom of expression applies to the Internet in the same way as it does to all communication media" and consider Internet restrictions as an "extreme measure-analogous to the prohibition of a newspaper or a radio or television station". The report emphasizes that "such blockades or restrictions cannot be justified, not even for reasons of public order or national security". The IACHR rapporteur also explained that the "adjudication, revocation, and renewal of licenses must be established by law and guided by objective, clear, impartial, and public criteria compatible with a democratic society; the process must be transparent; the decision that grants or denies the request must be duly motivated; and be subject to adequate judicial control".

Committee to Protect Journalists (CPJ) South coordinator, Natalie Southwick, has criticized the recent situation in Venezuela: "We are alarmed by the increasingly brazen censorship in Venezuela, including the repeated and selective restriction of internet access, a popular tool of authoritarian regimes. Venezuelan authorities should ensure that all internet platforms and news outlets—digital, radio, and television—are available to citizens seeking to access and share information".

Edgar Zambrano vice-minister of the National Assembly and ally of Guaidó was detained by the Bolivarian Intelligence Service (SEBIN) on 8 May. During the three hours after his detention, NetBlocks reported disruption of YouTube and Google services for CANTV users.

In June, the Venezuelan news website La Patilla was charged with "moral charges" and a fine of 30 billion bolivars (about $5m dollars) after publishing an ABC News article about drug traffic in Venezuela, that implicated the president of the pro-Maduro 2017 Constituent National Assembly, Diosdado Cabello. The website director Alberto Federico Ravell, supporter of Juan Guaidó, wrote that Cabello was engaging in "judicial terrorism". Cabello also added that he will take control of the website if it was unable to pay. Cabello had previously tried to raise judicial processes against ABC and The Wall Street Journal for accusations of drug trafficking, but the cases were rejected. Nathalie Southwick (CPJ) considers that the measure against La Patilla is an "attempt to bankrupt and shut down a critical outlet" and provides an "example of how the Venezuelan judicial system is being used to retaliate against critical media".

Without any previous judiciary order, the access to online newspapers El Pitazo and Efecto Cocuyo, through national and private internet providers, was blocked during the visit of the Office of the United Nations High Commissioner for Human Rights (OHCHR) chief Michelle Bachelet to Venezuela in June.

=== 2020 ===
During the COVID-19 pandemic in Venezuela, the National Assembly created a webpage to provide information on the coronavirus disease to the public. The access to the site was restricted for CANTV users. The censorship was denounced by Guaidó.

On 1 April, the website AlbertoNews was indefinitely restricted after a coverage of Operación Tun Tun (Operation Knock-Knock), a search and seizure operation by the Maduro administration.

=== Live speeches disrupted ===
Live streams of the National Assembly sessions and Guaidó's speeches and appearances have been regularly disrupted for CANTV users since the end of January, mainly affecting access to streaming platforms like Periscope, Bing, Twitter video, and YouTube, along with some other Google services. DNS blocking is employed to generate the disruptions. The longest block of YouTube to date started during an Assembly session on 6 March, lasting 20 hours.

After the events of 23 February to ship of humanitarian aid to Venezuela, Guaidó and Colombian President Iván Duque's evening speech in Las Tienditas Bridge was similarly blocked for CANTV users in Venezuela. More disruptions recurred during the Lima Group session on the 24th and during the US Vice President Mike Pence's speech on 25 February.

Another disruption on 15 April, affecting only CANTV users, occurred during the live stream of the press conference about Venezuela's crisis of US Secretary of State Mike Pompeo and Duque in Cúcuta.

Venezuelan politician Leopoldo López, detained during the 2014 protests and under house arrest by Maduro administration was released by pro-Guaidó military during the 30 April uprising. López and his family sought refuge in the Spanish embassy in Caracas. On 2 May, the disruption of internet services resumed during a press-conference where López spoke about his discussions with mid-military officers to oppose Maduro administration.

Disrupted live streamed speeches in 2019-2020
Year	Month	Day	Event
2019	January	27	Guaido's speech
2019	January	29	National Assembly session
2019	February	12	Guaidó's speech during International Youth Day
2019	February	18	Guaidó's speech
2019	February	22	Venezuela Aid Live and joint press conference of Guaidó and the presidents of Chile, Colombia and Paraguay
2019	February	23	Guaidó and Duque's speech
2019	February	24	Guaidó's reception in Bogotá to attend Lima Group session
2019	February	25	Pence's speech addressing Lima Group
2019	February	27	National Assembly session
2019	March	6	National Assembly session (20 hours)
2019	March	28	Guaidó speech about Operation Freedom
2019	April	15	Pompeo and Duque's speech
2019	April	19	Guaidó's public speech on the anniversary of the Venezuelan War of Independence and on the 2019 Sudanese coup d'état
2019	April	27	Guaido's public speech on the delivery of aid and state media censorship
2019	May	1	Guaido's speech
2019	May	2	López press-conference from the Spanish embassy
2019	May	3	Guaidó's speech on Edgar Zambrano investigation order, Guaido's speech to PDVSA union workers, and Lima Group conference in Peru about Venezuela's crisis
2019	May	7	National Assembly session on TIAR treaty
2019	May	9	Guaidó's press conference on Zambrano detention
2019	May	11	Guaidó's speech about political persecution and military support
2019	May	14	Guaidó's speech after security forces blocked the entry to the National Assembly
2019	May	16	Guaidó's meeting with professionals and technicians from Frente Amplio. He discussed the mediations in Norway, the release of Iván Simonovis and the discussions with the US Southern Command
2019	May	18	Guaidó's speech from Guatire
2019	May	21	National Assembly session on the gasoline shortage crisis
2019	May	23	Partial coverage of Guaido's speeches, offering medicine and aid at the Convent of the Agustinas in Los Teques
2019	May	24	Guaidó's national plan discussion from Andrés Bello Catholic University
2019	May	26	Guaidó speaks to his supporters in Barquisimeto, Lara
2019	May	28	National Assembly session
2019	June	11	National Assembly session
2019	June	15	Guaidó speech in Mérida calling for investigations on his appointees in Colombia
2019	June	17	Guaidó international press conference in Caracas, discussing alleged charges on his appointees in Colombia
2019	June	18	National Assembly session, topics include the release and return of Gilber Caro and alleged charges on appointees in Colombia
2019	June	19	Guaidó speech on food security and agriculture
2019	July	2	National Assembly session on navy captain Rafael Acosta Arévalo, who was detained and tortured to death
2019	July	5	Guaido's Independence Day speech.
2019	November	16	Return of new summon of protests. Twitter, Facebook and YouTube restricted, mainly during Guaidó speech
2020	January	5	2020 Venezuelan National Assembly Delegated Committee election

=== 2022 ===
On 5 July 2022, pro-government deputy Jesús Faría admitted that the government blocked digital outlets, saying "Just because you have the power and ability to communicate with the population, doesn't give you the power to say whatever you feel like saying."

== Phishing ==
The website "Voluntarios X Venezuela" was promoted by Guaidó and the National Assembly to gather volunteers for humanitarian aid; as of 16 February, Guaidó said 600,000 people had signed up. Between 12 and 13 February, CANTV users that tried to access were redirected to a mirror site with a different URL address. The mirror site asked for personal information: names, ID, address and telephone numbers. The fake site also hosted other phishing websites with the aim of obtaining email addresses, usernames and passwords. All the phishing websites used the .ve domain controlled by Conatel. This manipulation was denounced as a technique to identify dissidents to the government. Following the phishing incident, the official site was completely blocked for CANTV users on 16 February.

== Aggression, arrests and releases of press personnel ==
The Venezuelan press workers union denounced that in 2019, 40 journalists had been illegally detained as of 12 March; the National Assembly Parliamentary Commission for Media declared that there had been 173 aggressions against press workers as of 13 March. The commission planned to report these aggressions to the International Criminal Court.

A delegation led by Michelle Bachelet, United Nations High Commissioner for Human Rights visited Venezuela on March. In a preliminary oral report, Bachelet denounced the escalating freedom of speech and press restrictions in Venezuela.

According to Efecto Cocuyo director, Luz Mely Reyes, "journalism is becoming 'very complicated' in Venezuela where power outages, patchy internet and threats of violence have made reporting increasingly difficult". Reyes told Agence France-Presse (AFP) in April that she is unsure that independent outlets like Efecto Cocuyo may "survive" in this economic and political situation.

=== January 2019 ===
Two journalists—Beatriz Adrián of Caracol Televisión and Osmary Hernández of CNN—were detained while on-air and covering the 13 January detention of Guaidó.

Between 29 and 30 January, at least eleven press personnel were arrested. On the evening of 29 January, four journalists were arrested by the Maduro government while reporting near the Miraflores presidential palace—Venezuelan journalists Ana Rodríguez of VPI TV and Maiker Yriarte of TV Venezuela, and Chilean journalists Rodrigo Pérez and Gonzalo Barahona of TVN Chile. The two Venezuelan journalists were released; the Chilean journalists were deported.

Two French journalists from French TV show, Quotidien, and their Venezuelan producer were detained for two days at El Helicoide on 30 January. Three press workers of EFE were also arrested by SEBIN and DGCIM—a Colombian photographer, a Colombian companion, and a Spanish companion.

Jorge Arreaza, Venezuelan Minister for Foreign Affairs, defended the detentions, stating that press workers were part "of the media operation against the country" that wanted "to create a media scandal" by not "complying with the minimum prerequisites required by Venezuelan law". Press organizations stated that they complied with the migration laws of Venezuela. Maduro denied that journalists were detained by authorities.

=== February 2019 ===
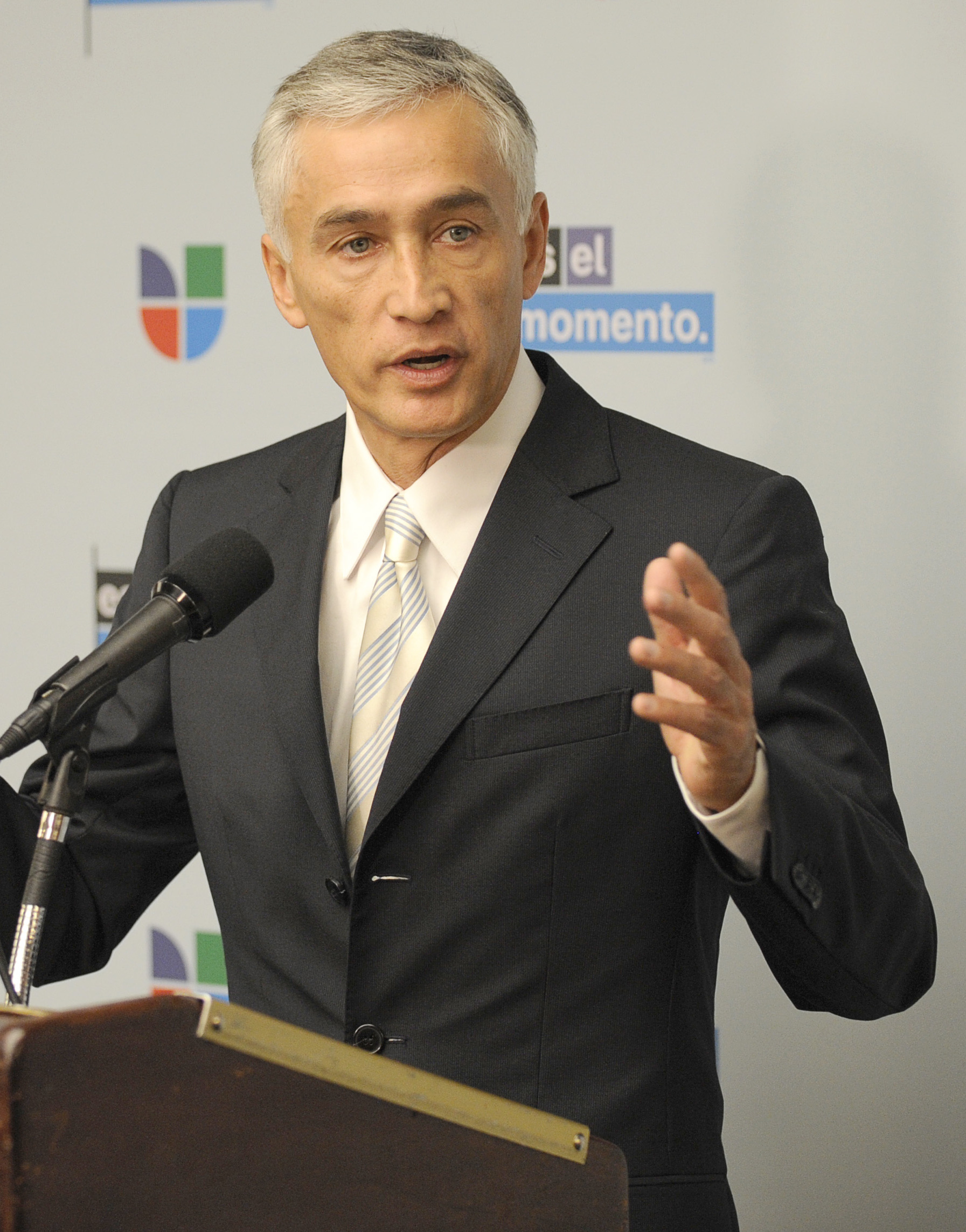
Univision anchor Jorge Ramos was detained by the Maduro administration in February 2019 after a live interview.

During the 23 February clashes, there were numerous reports of Venezuelan authorities and paramilitaries attacking press workers, including workers of the Associated Press, Ecos del Torbes, La Prensa de Lara, Telemundo, TVVenezuela, VIVOplay, VPItv and others.

Swedish reporter Annika Hernroth-Rothstein reported to the National Assembly that she was violently threatened, ransacked and beaten by pro-Maduro paramilitary groups known as colectivos on 23 February. Rothstein returned to Venezuela on 18 April, but she was briefly detained at the airport by the Venezuelan National Guard (GNB) and was subsequently deported.

Jorge Ramos, who The Guardian described as "arguably the best-known journalist in the Spanish-speaking world", was detained along with his Univisión crew members during an interview with Maduro on 25 February. Univisión equipment and materials were confiscated by Venezuelan authorities. During the interview, Maduro denied that a humanitarian crisis existed in Venezuela, which prompted Ramos to show Maduro images of Venezuelan children eating from a garbage truck and asking again if a crisis existed. After being released, Ramos stated that he and his group were held because this question bothered Maduro. The Univisión team was informed they would be deported, Maduro's Minister of Information Jorge Rodríguez described the incident as a "cheap show".

Telemundo journalist Daniel Garrido was detained for eight hours by SEBIN on 26 February and was later irregularly released on a side street in Caracas.

The journalist and dissident Chavist Alí Domínguez was kidnapped on 28 February; he was found comatose on the roadside of a major highway on the morning of the next day, though this was not released even to his family until several days later, shortly before he died as a result of injuries of beating and suspected torture.

=== March blackouts ===
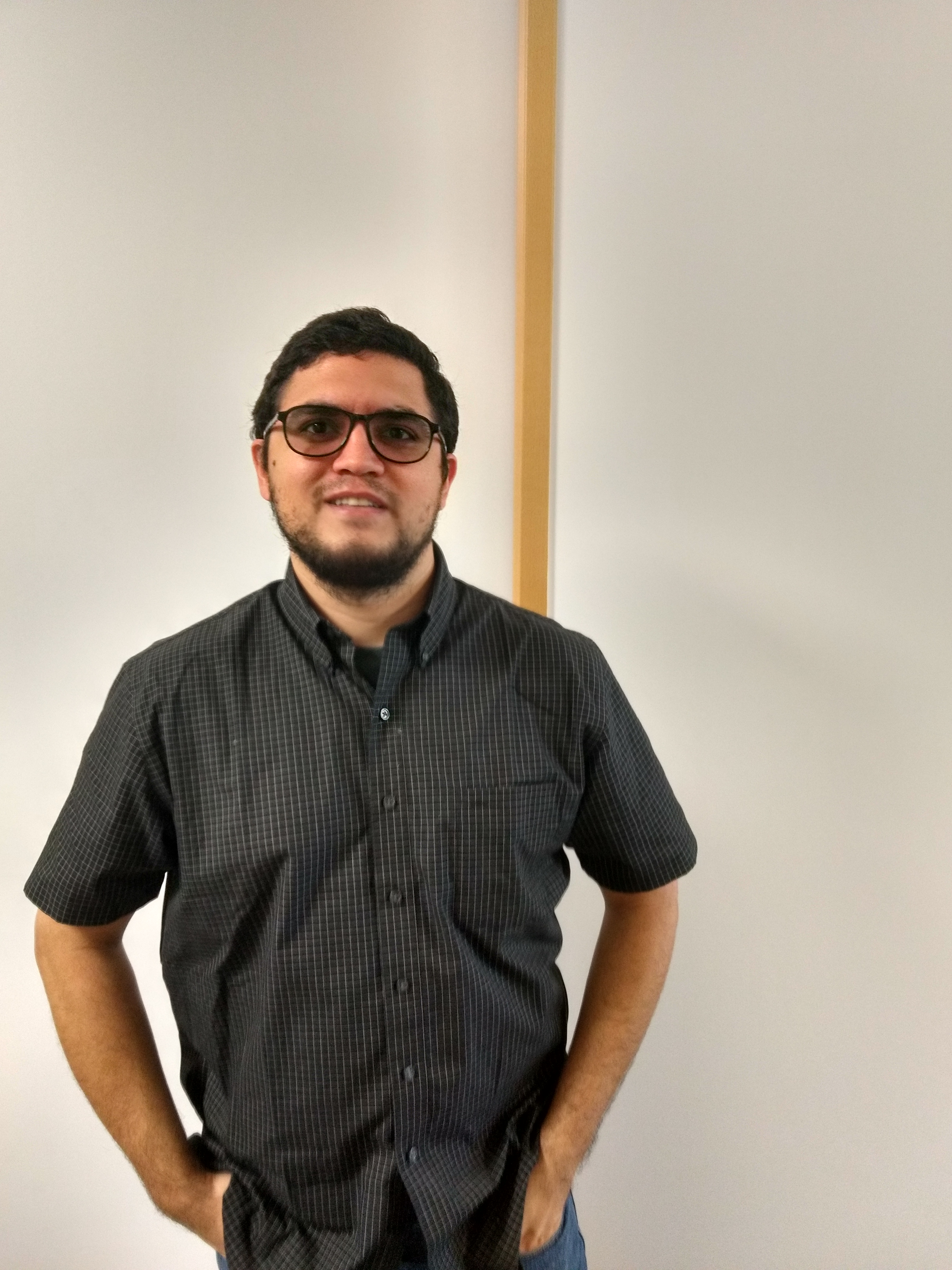
Venezuelan journalist Luis Carlos Díaz was detained for 30 hours in May. He was accused of sabotaging the national power grid.

US freelance journalist Cody Weddle and his Venezuelan coworker Carlos Camacho were detained for half a day on 7 March after Weddle house was raided and his equipment confiscated by military counterintelligence forces. US diplomats demanded Venezuelan authorities for Weddle's release. Weddle was deported afterwards.

During the 2019 Venezuelan blackouts, Venezuelan–Spanish journalist Luis Carlos Díaz was at his house when he was arrested by SEBIN forces, and taken along with his electronic equipment to El Helicoide. He said he had been physically attacked and that the intelligence agents had taken money from his house without reporting it. A group accompanied by his wife, journalist Naky Soto, protested in front of the prosecutor office. Michelle Bachelet, head of the UN Office of the High Commissioner for Human Rights, was in Caracas at that time and tweeted concern about the detention. The Spanish embassy in Caracas also contacted the government for information. Díaz was accused as an accomplice in a plot to cause the electricity outage, he was charged with instigation of a crime and is not allowed to leave Venezuela. He is also forbidden to participate in protests or to give statements to the media, and he must appear before court every eight days.

Gazeta Wyborcza Polish journalist, Tomasz Surdel, was briefly detained, threatened, and beaten, by police Special Actions Force (FAES) during the blackout, according to the Venezuelan press workers union. The newspaper's website said it had received complaints about his reporting on Maduro from the Venezuelan Embassy in Warsaw, and that he was not arrested but was viciously beaten and left by the side of the road.

German journalist Billy Six, who was detained in El Helicoide since 17 November 2018 charged of espionage, rebellion and security violations, was allowed to leave Venezuela on 16 March. He must report to court every 15 days and he cannot speak to the media about his detention. Reporters Without Borders had previously considered the allegations unproven and called for his release.

Venemundo Web reporter Dayana Krays was threatened with a gun by colectivos on 31 March.

During the second wave of blackouts, Venezuelan journalist Danilo Alberto Gil was detained in Zulia on 30 March while covering the protests in Ciudad Ojeda. At the time of the arrest, he was recording a video of the police repression against protesters and an attempt of detention of National Assembly members. Gil was released on 1 April judged with charges of resistance to authority and he is barred from leaving the country.

=== May 2019 ===
A National Assembly session was held on 7 May to discuss a proposal for Venezuela's return to Inter-American Treaty of Reciprocal Assistance (TIAR). News outlets were prevented to cover the session by police forces and some journalists were harassed by Maduro supporters. NetBlocks also reported internet outages during the session live-stream.

On the same day, Spanish journalist Joan Guirado covering the crisis in Venezuela for Okdiario was arrested and held for hours by SEBIN, and later expelled from Venezuela.

Under the alleged threat of the presence of an explosive, the entry to the parliament was blocked by the GNB and SEBIN on 14 May. The National Assembly session of that day, concerning the detention of their vicepresident Edgar Zambrano, had to be rescheduled for the next day. Jorge Millan, a National Assembly member, said that the report of "bombs" was false. Internet disruptions occurred during Guaido's public speech on the blockade. Guaidó tweeted "they're trying to hold the legislative power hostage while the dictator entrenches himself alone in a palace where he shouldn't be". The next day, media outlets were prevented from covering the parliamentary session. The security forces threatened reporters with detention if they did not clear out the vicinity of the parliament.

The access to media outlets to congress was blocked again on 21 and on 28 May.

Iván Simonovis—a former police commissioner arrested in November 2004 and accused by the Hugo Chávez government of the violence that took place in Caracas during the 2002 Llaguno Overpass events—left house arrest in May. Guaidó said that security forces loyal to him released Simonovis. Press workers from Caracol Televisión, TV Venezuela and Venevisión, were outside Simonovis house when his whereabouts were unknown. Five of the journalists were arbitrarily detained for three hours.

On 21 May, The Human Rights Watch and the CPJ called for the "immediate release" of the photojournalist Jesús Medina Ezaine held in Ramo Verde Prison. Medina was first detained in October 2017 alongside journalist Roberto di Matteo of Italy and Filippo Rossi of Switzerland while reporting at Tocorón penitentiary. After the detention, Medina went missing, according to the security forces, he was not held at their headquarters. Medina later appeared in November, left in a highway, he reported how he was tortured and threatened to death by his abductors. A team of journalists was working in an investigative project at Caracas hospital in August 2018 when Medina was arrested again. He was charged with inciting hate, illegal enrichment, and criminal association. On 2 May 2019, his preliminary hearing—that has to take place 45 days at most after a detention—was delayed for an eighth time. "Venezuelan authorities should immediately drop the absurd charges against Jesús Medina and stop finding pretexts to prolong his pretrial detention", said CPJ coordinator Nathalie Southwick. Medina was finally released in January 2020; he suffered from dental and vision problems while in detention.

=== June–August 2019 ===
News outlets were able to cover the National Assembly session on 4 June with the help of the members of the parliament. The media workers had to force their way through the blockade created by National Guardsmen.

Journalists had to force their way into parliament again on 18 June. Power outages and internet disruptions followed during the parliamentary session.

Braulio Jatar, Chilean-Venezuelan journalist and lawyer jailed in 2016 after accusing and protesting against Maduro for money laundering, was given conditional release on 5 July, the same day as the release of María Lourdes Afiuni and 20 students, according to Bachelet. The releases happened after the publication of a United Nations report on government-backed death squads and the petition from Bachelet to Maduro administration to release government dissidents. Afiuni's brother and Jatar said that they had not received official notices from Venezuela's judiciary. Jatar was officially released on 8 July but he has to present himself before a court every 15 days and he cannot leave Nueva Esparta state.

In July, La Verdad Venezuelan journalist Wilmer Quintana García was detained on charges of "incitement or promotion hate" under the Venezuelan Law against Hatred. Quintana García used his personal Facebook and Twitter accounts to report on corruption allegations carried out by Guárico governor José Manuel Vasquez and president of Alimentos Guárico Emilio Ávila. The allegations included the mismanagement of funds to resupply gas services and the resale of CLAP boxes at a higher price. The CPJ denounced the arrest indicating that "allegations of corruption against public officials are not hate speech". In August, Quintana García was taken to a hospital due to a possible cardiac arrest.

The Venezuelan Press Workers Union (SNTP) denounced and condemned attacks committed by members of Juan Guaidó's team against at least seven press workers during an activity in Maracay, Aragua state, on 31 August, stating that they were verbally and physically attacked. The Association of Venezuelan Journalists Abroad (APEVEX) denounced the attacks, declaring that "Venezuelan journalists already had enough of the attacks by the regime to now also be victims of the interim government". Guaidó apologized for the incident, assuring that he would take the necessary actions to prevent it from happening again.

=== November–December 2019 ===
Security forces from the Venezuelan military counterintelligence (DGCIM) entered Entorno Digital, a press office, on 19 November afternoon and detained its employees. The office director stated that he was not made aware of the justification for the detentions. Between the detainees there were members of news websites Caraota Digital and VPITv. The press workers were released some hours later during the night.

For 10 hours, SEBIN agents raided the offices of Venepress, a media owned by Telecaribe. Afterwards, the media was shut down indefinitely by the authorities without warrants nor government authorization for the raids, according to Venepress lawyers. Venepress news editor, Israel Barbuzano, suspects that the closures are part of an offensive against Telecaribe president who has supported Juan Guaidó in opinion columns.

=== January 2020 Parliament vote disrupted ===
During the 2020 Venezuelan National Assembly Delegated Committee election, to choose the president of the National Assembly, independent journalists were also impeded from covering the event. Maduro's Ministry of Information, which has no relationship to the National Assembly, allowed reporters from state-run media to enter the legislative palace. Other reporters were not allowed in and told to watch it on a live feed from outside.

State communications service CANTV reportedly blocked access to social media sites Twitter, Facebook, Instagram, and YouTube on the day of the election. Block tracking website NetBlocks reported that the block began as the National Assembly session did, criticizing this.

In a follow-up on 15 January, the entry to the parliament was blocked by police forces. Colectivos, pro-Maduro paramilitary groups, joined the scene and threatened lawmakers and journalists. Parallel to it, in Bolívar Square, colectivos attacked a teachers strike. Some journalists were attacked with human waste.

=== 2020 Punto de Corte report ===
Punto de Corte journalists Johan Álvarez and Alexandra Villán did an undercover report about CANTV, a major state owned telecommunication company, where they were able to infiltrate the main headquarters in Caracas with help of workers and showed several problems, including malfunctioning equipment and, as well as the lack of required air conditioning, which causes many problems experienced by users. After the report was published, the journalists were threatened and Punto de Corte was blocked in Venezuela. The day after the report was published, on 1 February, Álvarez and Villán were hit by a car in Baralt Avenue of Caracas while Álvarez was riding a motorcycle. Álvarez had a skull fracture and internal bleeding, while Villán received tibia and fibula fractures.

=== Airport incident in February 2020 ===
During Juan Guaidó return to Venezuela in February 2020, after his second international tour, a group of supporters and pro-Maduro agitators received him in the airport. Despite the travel ban imposed on Guaidó, he was allowed to enter the country. During Guaidó's arrival, various media workers were insulted, harassed, robbed and physically aggressed by the agitators. According to the Venezuelan Press Working Union (SNTP), Venezuelan security forces were present and witnessed the attacks, but did not intervene. Between the reported incidents there were two reporters that were punched and kicked in the face and a female journalist that was bitten by an agitator. Videos and photos of the events circulated over social media. A SNTP worker reported that some agitators carried knives and razors and threatened journalists.

Two days later, when journalists were going to file the complaint to the authorities, security forces impeded their access to the prosecutor office.

=== During COVID-19 pandemic ===
In April 2020, the National Journalists College reported that there had been 62 attacks against the Venezuelan press that year, 28 of which happened between 1 and 15 April.

==== On fuel shortages ====
The house of journalist Eduardo Galindo in Apure by Venezuelan anti-extortion and kidnapping unit from the Venezuelan National Guard (GNB) on 15 April afternoon. Galindo was brought to police headquarters and was interrogated for his publications in Senderos de Apure, a news website. Hours later Galindo's wife and brother were taken into custody too. Galindo's recent post related to fuel shortages in the region. According to the National Journalist Union, the authorities have not provided any additional information about Galindo's arrest, which had been conducted without a warrant, or filed any charges against him. The local prosecutor denied a document by the union demanding Galindo's release.

== Foreign censorship on the crisis ==
The authorities of China, supporters of the Maduro government, have censored information about the presidential crisis according to Radio Free Asia. Reports from China state that Chinese citizens who criticize Maduro on social media are punished or fined, with economist He Jiangbing saying that the Chinese government is "trying to prevent another color revolution... because Venezuela and China are very similar".

After the news website Runrun.es published a report on extrajudicial killings by the Bolivarian National Police, on 25 May, the Venezuelan Press and Society Institute (IPYS – Spanish: Instituto de Prensa y Sociedad) pointed out that the website was out of service due to an "uncached request attack", denouncing that it originated from Russia.
