= VPItv =

Venezuelan streaming channel

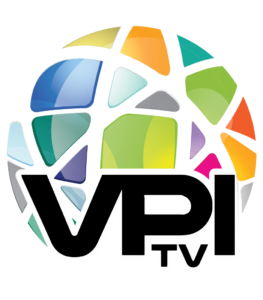
- Type: Internet television
- Branding: VPItv
- Country: Venezuela
- Availability: Worldwide
- Founded: 10 October 2015 by Leonardo Trechi and Fabiola Colmenares
- Headquarters: Miami, Florida, United States
- Launch date: 6 December 2015 (Start of transmissions); 19 December 2016 (Official)
- Picture format: 1080p
- Official website: VPItv

YouTube information
- Channel: VPItv
- Years active: 2015–present
- Genres: News, Politics, Public Affairs
- Subscribers: 687 thousand
- Views: 97 million
- Last updated: June 2020

VPItv (Spanish: Venezolanos por la Información TV; Venezuelans for Information TV) is a US-based Venezuelan online television channel founded by Fabiola Colmenares and Leonardo Trechi. The channel is based in Caracas, Venezuela and Miami, Florida, United States.

In 2017, several of their journalists were subject to attacks, and since 2019 the website and its YouTube channel have been continuously censored in Venezuela by the Nicolás Maduro government.

== History ==
VPItv was founded by former Miss Venezuela contestant Fabiola Colmenares and Popular Will politician Leonardo Trechi on 10 October 2015. Transmissions began on 6 December 2015 and officially became live on 19 December 2016. The YouTube channel was established on 21 December 2015.

Following the 2015 Venezuelan parliamentary election which the MUD-led opposition won over the PSUV, VPItv (together with VIVOplay and Capitolio TV) started transmissions of the National Assembly From 2010 until January 2016, ANTV was the only television channel authorized to broadcast PSUV-led National Assembly sessions.

== Coverage during the crisis in Venezuela ==
During the 2017 Venezuelan protests, Venezuelan internet users reported that several live streaming websites including VPItv were inaccessible on 7 April 2017.

== Attacks on reporters ==
On April 6, 2017, reporter Elvis Flores was arrested while covering the protests during the constitutional crisis. At the time of his arrest, police took Flores’ equipment and VPItv was subsequently forced to stop the broadcasts for the next 8 hours. The reporter was released 9 hours later and was reportedly beaten.

During the 2017 Venezuelan regional elections in Tachira State, VPItv journalist Lorena Bornacelly and cameraman Óscar Duque were robbed of their work equipment and belongings from their car, which was parked near a polling station where they were working.

On October 16, 2017, the day following the regional elections, protesters in Bolívar State attacked VPItv journalist Carlos Suniaga. According to National Union of Press Workers of Venezuela (SNTP), Carlos Suniaga was threatened and beaten by opposition supporters around the Regional Electoral Office, additionally, they forced him to erase the material from the protest and kicked him in the back. Suniaga later said that both the opposition and supporters of the government must respect the work of the press.

=== 2019 Venezuelan presidential crisis ===
Following the 2019 presidential crisis, VPItv and other private TV channels has been the main target of censorship by the Bolivarian government. Access to YouTube is blocked frequently to prevent CANTV users from watching its live stream.

Live streams of the National Assembly sessions and Guaidó's speeches have been regularly disrupted for CANTV users since the end of January, mainly affecting access to streaming platforms like Periscope, Bing, Twitter video, and YouTube, along with some other Google services. DNS blocking is employed to generate the disruptions. The longest block of YouTube to date started during an Assembly session on 6 March, lasting 20 hours.

Between 29 and 30 January, at least eleven press personnel were arrested. On the evening of 29 January, four journalists were arrested by the Maduro government while reporting near the Miraflores presidential palace—Venezuelan journalists Ana Rodríguez of VPItv and Maiker Yriarte of TV Venezuela, and Chilean journalists Rodrigo Pérez and Gonzalo Barahona of TVN Chile. The two Venezuelan journalists were released; the Chilean journalists were deported.

During 23 February clashes, there were numerous reports of Venezuelan authorities and paramilitaries attacking press workers, including workers of the Associated Press, Ecos del Torbes, La Prensa de Lara, Telemundo, TVVenezuela, VIVOplay, VPItv and others.

After the events of 23 February to ship of humanitarian aid to Venezuela, Guaidó and Colombian President Iván Duque's evening speech in Las Tienditas Bridge was similarly blocked for CANTV users in Venezuela. More disruptions recurred during the Lima Group session on the 24th and during the US Vice-president Mike Pence's speech on 25 February.

The livestream of the press conference of US Secretary of State Mike Pompeo and Colombian President Iván Duque Márquez on 15 April 2019 was disrupted for CANTV users.

== See also ==
- Television in Venezuela
- Censorship in Venezuela
- Censorship and media control during the Venezuelan presidential crisis
