= El Chigüire Bipolar =

Venezuelan satire website

- Motto: Noticias parciales y sin veracidad a manos de un roedor con peos psicológicos (Spanish: Biased and untruthful news at the hands of a rodent with psychological issues)
- Website type: Satire, political humor
- Headquarters: Venezuela
- Website: elchiguirebipolar.net
- Launched: 15 May 2008; 18 years ago
- Current status: Active

El Chigüire Bipolar (English: The Bipolar Capybara) is a comedic journalism and news satire portal, launched on 15 May 2008 by the Venezuelans Elio Casale, Oswaldo Graziani, and Juan Andrés Ravell, who are also the creators of the animated series La isla presidencial. The website and its creators belong to the media group Plop Media, based in Caracas and Miami.

== History ==
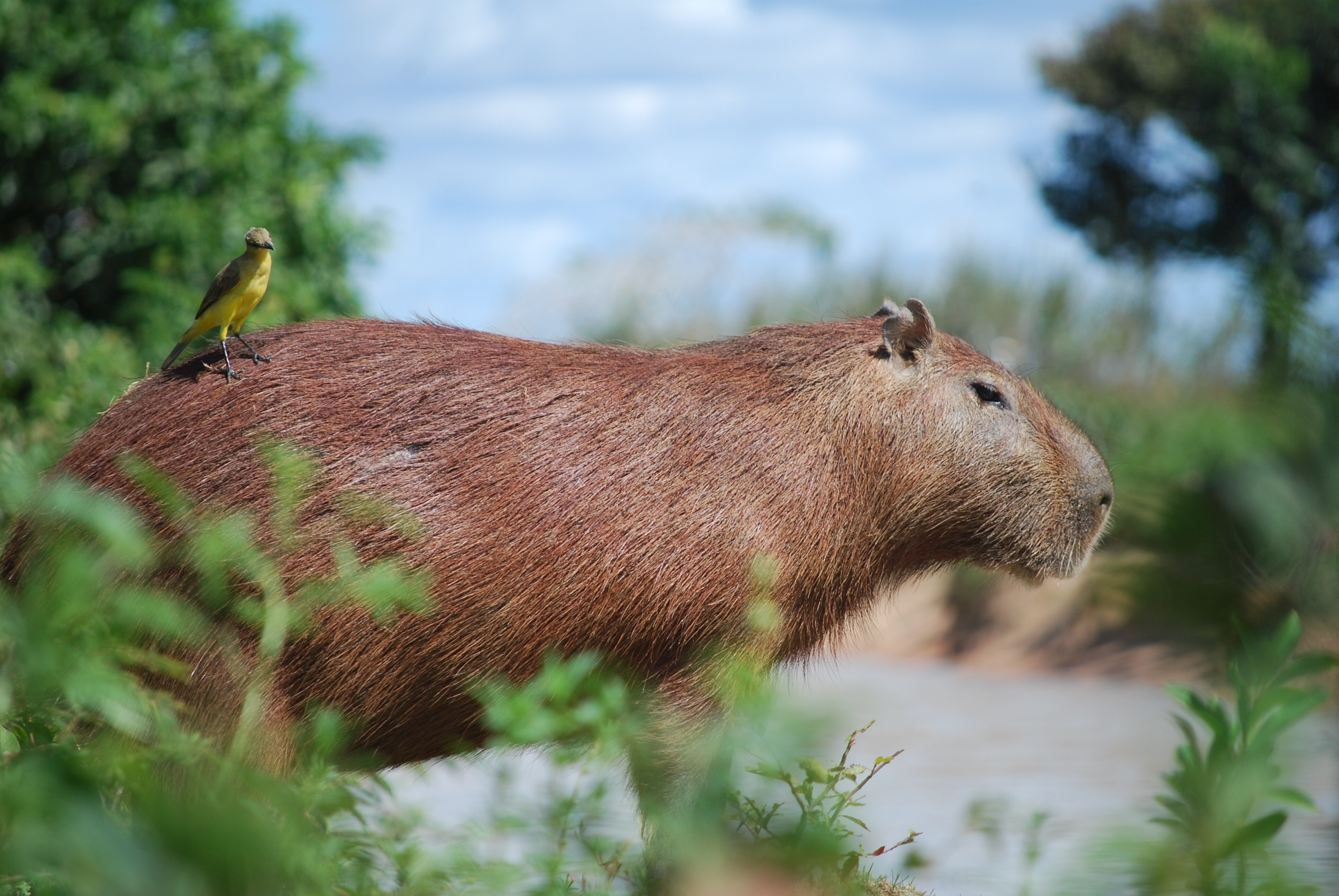
An image of a chigüire, the largest rodent, which the website is named after

The website initially became popular for mocking Hugo Chávez — by 2010, it was already surpassing main national news outlets in terms of views — though is also liked for its satirising of opposition politicians and regular Venezuelans alike, and has been compared to the similar American website The Onion. In 2018, Ravell said that it was "a stretch" to suggest that the website provided hope with their humour, but that he hoped they could "bridge a gap with the censorship that's happening on TV and radio". Since 2014, the website has co-produced the comedic TV news show "Weekly Report", hosted by José Rafael Briceño, with VIVOplay.

In 2013, Henrique Capriles denounced that an upper-level high school textbook on contemporary history included a satirical cover of newspaper El Nacional that was created by El Chigüire Bipolar, representing the Chávez-led 1992 coup attempts. At least 26 people had developed the textbook, which was approved by the Education Minister, with 400,000 copies printed.

In 2016, the BBC praised the website for exploiting national blackouts "for all of their comedic potential", compared to other newspapers and even the popular internet memes shared on social media in the country, including fake articles like reporting on how Venezuelans have developed night vision, sharing a humorous pseudo-government-proposed daily routine, and celebrating the blackouts for their reprieve from compulsory broadcasts (cadenas).

El Chigüire Bipolar was a winner of the Václav Havel Prize for Creative Dissent in 2017, together with the Zimbabwean activist and playwright Silvanos Mudzvov and the Bahraini poet and activist Ayat Al-Qurmezi, presented at the 2017 Oslo Freedom Forum. According to Garry Kasparov, secretary of the Human Rights Foundation, "their crude humor and rigorous analysis demonstrates the great power that satire has in the present to criticize authoritarian regimes".

== Contributors ==
In May 2017, the team of El Chigüire Bipolar was Juan Andrés Ravell, Graziani, Casale, Jesús Roldán, Víctor Medina, Christopher Andrade, and Daniel Pérez. In 2018, Ravell said that the website had five full-time staff members, and a further five part-time staff.

== See also ==
- List of satirical news websites
