= Nelson Bocaranda =

Venezuelan journalist

Nelson Bocaranda Sardi
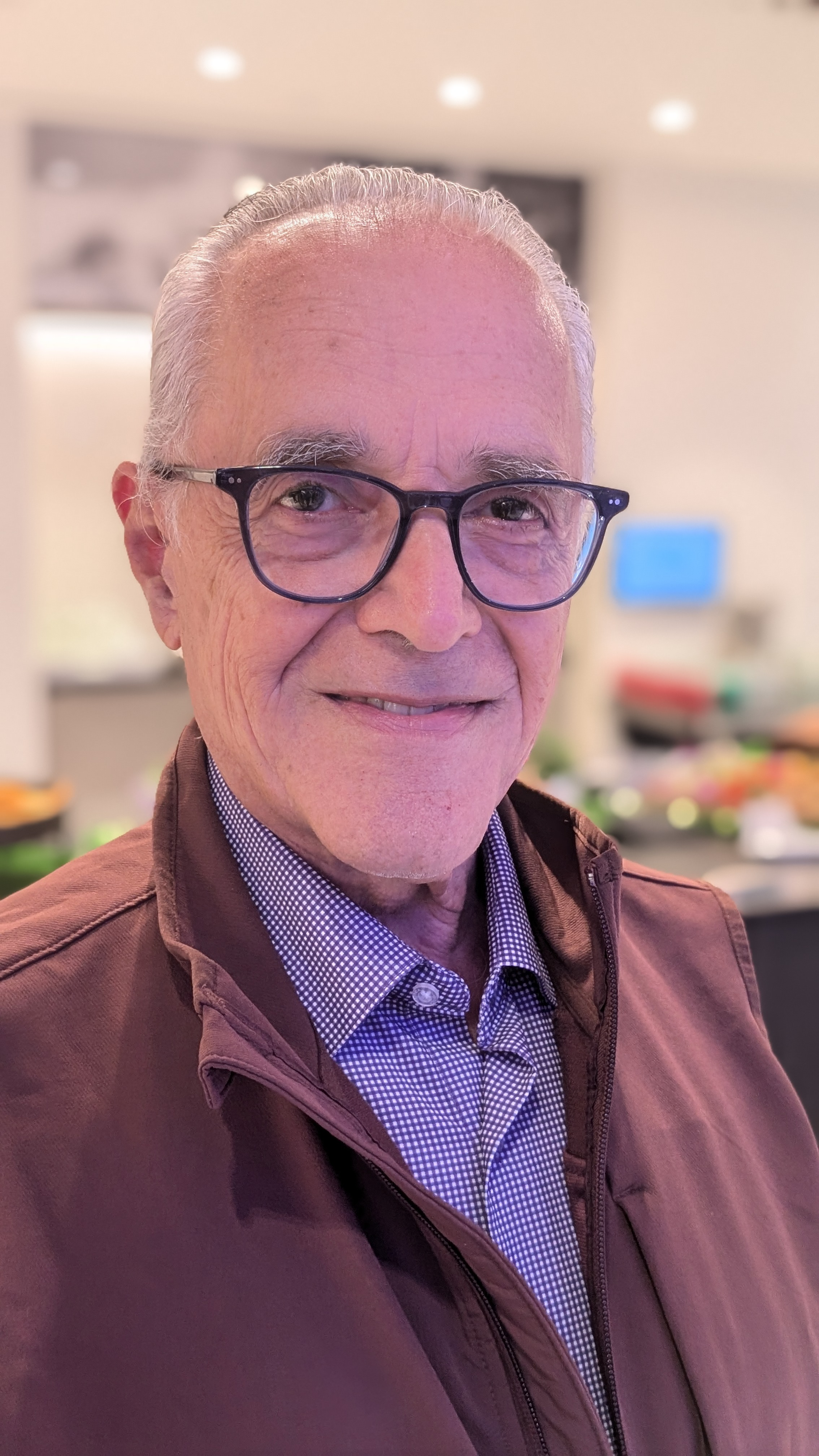
- Nelson Bocaranda Sardi
- Born: Nelson Bocaranda Sardi; 18 April 1945 (age 81); Boconó, Venezuela
- Occupation: journalist

Nelson Bocaranda Sardi (born 18 April 1945) is a Venezuelan television commentator, columnist, investigative journalist, and founder of the Runrunes website. He has received several awards for his work, including the 1985 National Journalism Award.

== Early life and education ==
Bocaranda was born in Boconó, Venezuela on 18 April 1945 as the oldest of five children of Alfredo Bocaranda González and Italia Sardi Consalvi de Bocaranda. Of Spanish and Italian ancestry, Bocaranda's grandfather was a storekeeper and his father was a pharmacist. The family moved to Caracas when Nelson was two, and he grew up in the San Bernardino area of the city. He was educated at La Salle de la Colina, graduating in 1962; his interest in reading was inspired by his grandmother, and he was encouraged by one of his Catholic teachers to become a journalist.

Before he finished his secondary education, Bocaranda began studying journalism at the Universidad Católica Andrés Bello; he began working for the television station Venevisión under Óscar Yanes, who was his journalism professor. During his university tenure, Bocaranda worked for various radio stations in Caracas, including Radio Aeropuerto, Radio Capital, Radio Continente and KYS-FM.

== Career ==
=== Radio, television and newspaper ===
Bocaranda left Venevisión to work for Radio Caracas Televisión (RCTV) in the early 1980s, returning to Venevisión in 1988. In 1989, he worked as a foreign correspondent for Venezolana de Televisión (VTV) in New York. During the 1990s, he had a political opinion show on Venevisión called Vox Populi; A puerta cerrada and En confianza were other popular television shows he moderated. By 1996, Bocaranda held primetime television broadcasts in Caracas.

Bocaranda returned to late night television at VIVOplay in 2015 following a long absence from regular television.

On Unión Radio, Bocaranda had a weekday show, Los Runrunes de Nelson or The Rumors of Nelson, which began in 1998. Bocaranda also wrote columns for several Venezuelan newspapers.

=== Runrunes, Twitter and Chávez's cancer ===
Described as a pro-opposition journalist, Bocaranda has criticized both Hugo Chávez and Nicolás Maduro, and their governments. Los Runrunes de Nelson was cancelled in 2009 after the Venezuelan government reportedly said that it would revoke Unión Radio's license if Bocaranda's criticism was allowed to continue on air. The following year, Bocaranda and his son created the Runrunes website. Janan Abanhassan and Andrés Cañizález wrote in the Comunicación: estudios venezolanos de comunicación journal in 2016 that the website was born from the censorship that forced Bocaranda off the radio; they named Bocaranda as a "leader of public opinion in Venezuela" for "becoming the spokesperson for the truth, for disseminating the information under investigative support and for having trust and credibility in Venezuelan society".

Bocaranda was the first to reveal Chávez's 2011 cancer diagnosis. Contrary to Article 143 of the 2009 Constitution of Venezuela, which disallows censorship of information about public officers, and with the 2012 Venezuelan presidential election looming, there were no precise medical reports, and information about Chávez's health was "tightly controlled by him and the closest members of his Government" according to Carolina Acosta-Alzuru in the 2016 book, Health Communication in the Changing Media Landscape. On 9 May, Chávez cancelled a trip, saying he had knee pain, and on 10 June, Maduro stated that Chávez had surgery in Havana, Cuba for a pelvic abscess. The government continued to deny concerns about Chávez's health when, on 25 June, Bocaranda revealed that Chávez had cancer. Until that time, information about Chávez's health was held secret by the government; Chávez's diagnosis was confirmed by government officials the day after Bocaranda revealed it. Alzuru writes that the secrecy was because Chávez's "close allies suspected that no other chavista would be able to win elections as easily as Chávez did. That is why they played the card of a recuperating Chávez in charge until the very end", while investigative journalists "filled the information vacuum", being the first to report information based on "sources they had cultivated for decades", which resulted in them being "maligned by Government officials who denied their stories, only to have them confirmed a few days later by Chavez himself".

Bocaranda's revelation, which was followed by others as Chávez's illness progressed, resulted in him receiving more widespread recognition than at any time in his career. According to El Estímulo, in 2015, younger people were more likely to recognize him as "The Father of Venezuelan Twitter", in contrast to older people who remember him more as a moderator of several television shows. Bocaranda's Twitter account is described as a "must read" by BBC Mundo and Reuters; he had 2,600 Twitter followers in 2009, 570,000 followers in 2012, 1.97 million by 2015 (compared then to Maduro's 2.35 million), and more than 3 million in 2021.

Bocaranda's Twitter was hacked in 2016 and the hackers used the account to Tweet that Bocaranda acknowledged being a US Central Intelligence Agency (CIA) puppet.

=== Responses ===
In response to Bocaranda reporting June 2009 rumors that BBVA Provincial would be sold, El País published that the "Venezuelan branch of BBVA today denied ... the 'irresponsible' rumors spread by journalist Nelson Bocaranda, on his radio program Runrunes", adding that "this information has already been denied both in the Runrunes program" and by another agency that reported it.

The Venezuelan Instituto Prensa y Sociedad (IPYS – Press and Society Institute) issued a report in 2013 on pressure directed by the judicial system at journalists who were critical of the government, listing as one of the cases a court summons to Bocaranda after he revealed the cancer diagnosis of Chávez which stated that Bocaranda had been "associated with acts of violence after the April 14 elections".

Bocaranda was described in 2011 and 2012 Wall Street Journal articles as a "prominent" and "respected Venezuelan columnist". In 2015, the Spanish newspaper Ideal described Bocaranda as a "veteran" and "the most popular journalist in Venezuela", citing his Twitter followers, adding that "different spheres of the Venezuelan government" said Bocaranda worked for the CIA due to his reports on Chávez's illness; the allegations have never been substantiated.

== Awards ==
Bocaranda received various awards in Venezuela. He was awarded the Municipal Prize in Journalism in 1965 and 1967. He was awarded the National Prize of Journalism from the Fundación Premio Nacional de Periodismo (National Journalism Award Foundation) in 1985, and the Monseñor Pellín Award from the Episcopal Conference of Venezuela, recognized in the latter's Person of the Year category in 2019.

== Publications ==
- El Poder de los Secretos [The Power of Secrets] (2015) with Diego Arroyo Gil, Planeta de Venezuela, ISBN 978-9802715480
