= Sdarot =

Israeli streaming service

Sdarot / סדרות
- Website type: Online streaming media website
- Available in: Hebrew
- Dissolved: December 2023
- Country of origin: Israel
- Area served: Worldwide
- Revenue: Purchase option inside the website
- Commercial: Yes
- Registration: Required
- Users: 863,009
- Launched: January 2011
- Current status: Defunct
- Content license: Unlicensed

Sdarot (Hebrew: סדרות, lit. 'Series') was an Israeli piracy-based streaming media website that streamed content from Israel and from across the world. As of March 2022, Sdarot claimed to be the biggest online streaming website in Israel, reporting over 1.3 billion views across all its content.

== History ==
The site was established in January 2011 and began to provide pirated content with built-in Hebrew subtitles, with their goal being "making TV series accessible for all the population, without the need to pay huge amounts of money to TV corporations".

During the years of its operation, the site changed its address several times following their battle against the copyright infringement company "Zira". The site's had an application that bypassed DNS blocking with a built-in VPN.

On 11 March 2021, the site went down due to a fire at a server farm in France where some of the company's servers were stored. The site was back online after two days.

At the end of 2021, according to the site's statistics, the site crossed one billion views across all its content.

== Sratim ==
Sratim (Hebrew: סרטים, lit. 'Films') was the sister site to Sdarot, it published unlicensed movies rather than TV shows. The movies on the site had user-generated Hebrew subtitles super-imposed on them, like on Sdarot.

== Website activity ==
The site allowed people to view its content from multiple servers, but there was also a purchase option that allowed people to watch the series from a special server without waiting 30 seconds. The site also had a forum that was closed in 2020. The site was said to be operated by 100 volunteers.

== Legal battle ==
Various organizations, including Zira, had been trying to close the website due to copyright infringement for years. In 2016, a blocking order was issued, and Internet providers began blocking access to the site's domain. However, despite the order, the site continued to operate on new or different domains, and many people in Israel accessed the site by changing their DNS to 1.1.1.1 or by VPN. In January 2017, Facebook blocked the page of the site which had 77,000 followers, and on 17 February 2022, their Instagram and Telegram pages were blocked as well.

Another closure order was issued in January 2020, and Israeli ISPs blocked access to the site's domain at the DNS level again.

In May 2022, the United States District Court for the Southern District of New York ruled that Sdarot TV and two other websites were providing illegal service, and ordered US ISPs to block access to them.
