= Venezuelans in Iceland =

Venezuelans in Iceland Venezolanos en Islandia
Total population
- 1,973 (2026)

Regions with significant populations
- Reykjavík, Kópavogur, Hafnarfjörður, Akureyri, Selfoss

Languages
- Spanish, Icelandic

Religion
- Catholicism

Venezuelans in Iceland are the 11th largest migrant community in Iceland, as of 2026. The Venezuelan community in Iceland has been formed mostly as a result of migration during the early and mid 2020s as a result of the Venezuelan crisis.

During the early years of 2020s many Venezuelans applied for asylum in Iceland, due to the bad situation in Venezuela, in terms of economy and security. Iceland gave approval to almost all Venezuelan asylum applicants until 2022-23 (when Venezuela was deemed safe country by the Icelandic migration authorities), when many applications began to be rejected and the flow of Venezuelans declined. The favorable policy for Venezuelans contributed in the growth of the Venezuelan community from 228 people in 2020 to 1,221 in 2023.

As of 2026, 1,973 Venezuelans live in Iceland, out of which 1,931 possessed only Venezuelan citizenship. According to Statistics Iceland, a small but increasing amount of Venezuelan residents in Iceland get naturalized as Icelandic citizens. A slim majority of them lives in the Reykjavík municipality, but many live in other municipalities of the country as well, mostly in the main cities.

== History ==
=== Before 2020s ===
The first Venezuelans began to arrive in the country at around 1990, in small numbers.

By 2010, around 30 Venezuelans lived in the country. However, with the crisis in Venezuela reaching a critical stage after 2016, the number of Venezuelans who left their country soared and since then, around 8 million have moved to other countries in the world.

The crisis resulted in the beginning of an emigration wave of Venezuelans to the country, with asylum requests from Venezuelans increasing from 0 in 2016 to 14 in 2018 with eight approvals.

In 2019, many Venezuelans began to arrive in Iceland, and around 160 received asylum, as all asylum applicants from Venezuela got their applications approved. According to a BBC Mundo article in 2022, Venezuelans began to migrate to the country attracted from the friendly policies of the country towards migrants, its high living standards, and it's safety. Psychologists who work with Venezuelan migrants have stated that many Venezuelan migrants have lived traumatic experiences due to the insecurity in the country. In 2019, Venezuelans were the nationality with the highest number of approved asylum applications in Iceland.

According to a 2020 study on the members of the Venezuelan community of Iceland, Venezuelans in Iceland are feeling more safe in Iceland than in Venezuela. They also tend to trust the Icelandic police and institutions in a far greater degree than in Venezuela. However, the vast majority of the Venezuelans surveyed said that they would like to return in Venezuela, if things improve in the country.

=== 2020 to today ===
Iceland began to become a destination for some Venezuelans, as in the early 2020s hundreds of Venezuelans were being granted asylum annually in the years between 2020 and 2022. In 2019 180 asylum requests from Venezuelans were approved, and in 2021 the number increased to almost 360.

According to RÚV, in 2022 Venezuelans were the second nationality in terms of asylum applications after Ukrainians (due to the Russian invasion of Ukraine), with more than 400 people being granted protection by the authorities in the first nine months of 2022. The size of the Venezuelan community increased a lot in 2022 as immigration continued and the immigration appeals committee rejected a Directorate of Immigration decision to end international protection for Venezuelans, resulting in increased immigration from Venezuela. From January 2022 to April 2023, more than 2,000 Venezuelans applied for asylum, due to favorable policies for Venezuelans as a result of the bad situation in the country.

The large amount of arrivals of Venezuelans in 2022 generated concern among some Icelandic politicians. Many Venezuelans have been attending language classes, in order to better integrate in their new homeland.

As of 2023, many Venezuelan migrants in Iceland, which often applied for asylum in the country, live in difficult conditions, as the Venezuelan asylees are not granted employment permits.

In April 2023 meanwhile, the Icelandic government announced that Iceland was considered a safe country, and thus the authorities began to reject a lot of asylum applications from Venezuelans, despite that the situation in the country was still very bad. The Icelandic government began to prepare for deportations of Venezuelan nationals, something that was challenged by the Venezuelan community, emphasizing that the insecurity back in Venezuela was a core reason why they applied for asylum in the country. Though asylum applications from Venezuela surpassed the mark of 1,000 in 2022 and 2023, the rejection of a significant amount of appeals resulted in a decline of applications.

In November 2023, almost 200 migrants from Venezuela returned to Venezuela from Iceland, in a deportation flight. Venezuelan government-aligned media mentioned that this development happened as a result of the Vuelta a la Patria program, while opposition-aligned La Patilla reported that the Venezuelans who returned during this flight were briefly detained.

In 2024, the asylum applications from Venezuelans declined drastically from around 1,500 to 160, due to the adoption of new laws and rejections of asylum applications. As a result, due to the tightening of asylum policies, families with children were also denied asylum, affecting children with various health problems.

In 2025 and 2026, despite that the decrease of asylum applications resulted in a slowing of the Venezuelan immigration to Iceland, the Venezuelan community in Iceland continued to grow. In 2024 there was a net immigration of 183 Venezuelans in the country, and in 2025, a net immigration of 360 Venezuelans. Hence, the number of Venezuelans in Iceland grew from 1,371 people in 2024 to 1,973 in 2026.

== Areas of settlement ==
A slim majority of the Venezuelans in Iceland live in Reykjavík municipality, specifically 1,057 people as of 2026. In the municipalities of Hafnarfjörður, Reykjanesbær, Garðabær, and Kópavogur there are more than 100 Venezuelans each. Though Venezuelans are gradually settling throughout Iceland, most of them lives in the cities of Iceland, as per Statistics Iceland.
