= María Fernanda Navia =

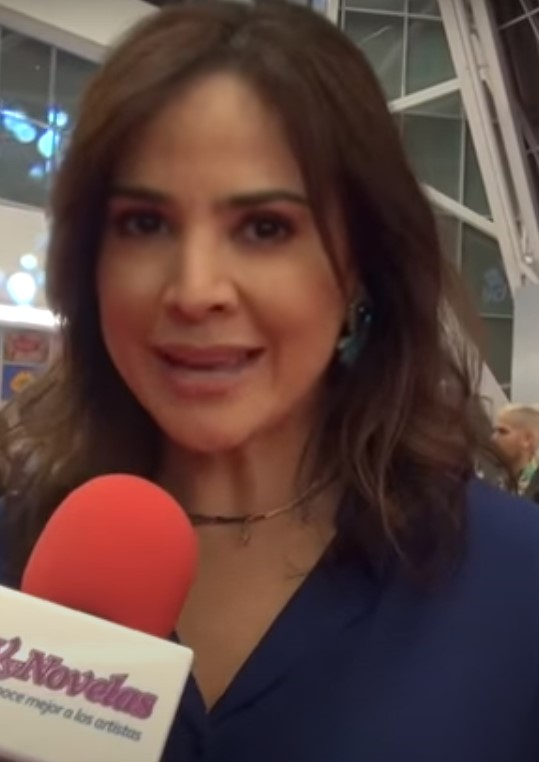
María Fernanda Navia

María Fernanda Navia Cardona (born 1 January 1979 in Bogotá) is a Colombian journalist, model, and former beauty queen. She was Miss Bogotá 2000 and participated as the city's delegate at Miss Colombia 2000 and Former Miss Earth Colombia.

== Career ==
Navia majored in Social Communication and Journalism from the University of La Sabana. She has worked on local channel Citytv, Canal Uno's gossip programme Sweet and CM& newscast, Cable Noticias, TV Azteca's tabloid newsmagazine Asignación especial, as a correspondent for Telemundo, and W Radio.

Since June 2011 she works as presenter of a segment on Noticias Uno newscast.
