= Neisser =

Neisser is a German surname. Notable people with the surname include:

- Albert Ludwig Sigesmund Neisser (1855–1916), German physician
- Kersten Neisser (born 1956), German rower
- Ulric Neisser (1928–2012), American psychologist
- Neisser Banout (born c. 1995), Venezuelan comedian

== See also ==
- Nysa (disambiguation)
