= Juan Andrés Ravell =

- Born: Venezuela
- Occupation: Filmmaker
- Father: Alberto Federico Ravell
- Awards: Havel Prize

Juan Andrés Ravell is a Venezuelan filmmaker. He is one of the founders of El Chigüire Bipolar.

== Biography ==
In 2008 he founded El Chigüire Bipolar, a satirical newspaper, critical of the chavista governments and, at the same time, of their opposition. In 2010 he created the web series Isla Presidencial.

In 2017 El Chigüire Bipolar won the Havel Prize, which Ravell shared with Oswaldo Graziani and Elio Casale.

In 2023, then-Congressman Diosdado Cabello announced that he would sue Ravell and the rest of the creators of El Chigüire Bipolar after a satirical publication about him.

In 2024 Ravell published on PBS A Dangerous Assignment, a documentary about the investigation of the journalist Roberto Deniz of Armando.Info, exiled, regarding Alex Saab and his role in the government of Nicolás Maduro.

== Filmography ==
- Isla Presidencial (serie)
- A Dangerous Assignment (2024)
