= Neisser Banout =

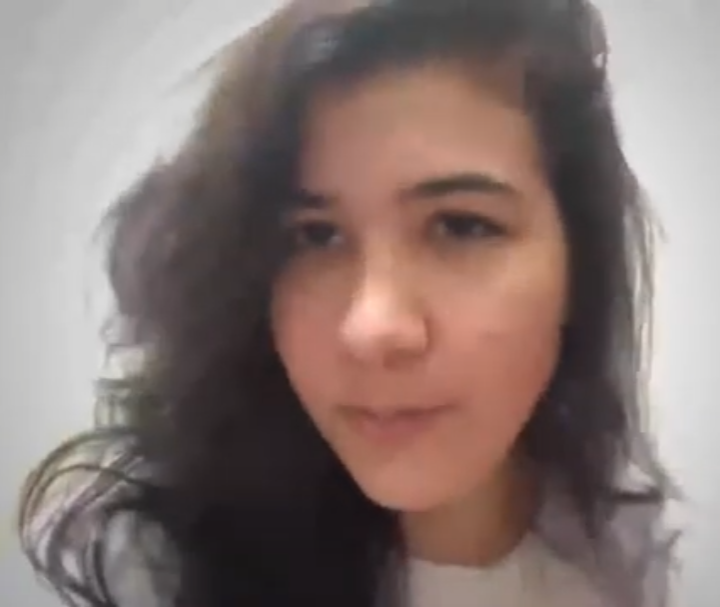
- In a 2020 video for Efecto Cocuyo
- Born: c. 1995; Venezuela
- Occupation: Comedian

Neisser Banout (born c. 1995) is a Venezuelan comedian. The beginnings of her career date back to 2019 through stand up, at which time she was also a scriptwriter for programs such as A toque and the satirical portal El Chigüire Bipolar. In 2021 she participated in an event to celebrate the second anniversary of Espaja in the community of San Blas de Petare, Caracas. Neisser has toured nationwide and hosted the podcast Jasy y Neisser.

== Personal life ==
Neisser is lesbian and has Syrian descent. Her parents are Venezuelan, but her grandparents are Syrians who fled Syria during World War II and emigrated to Venezuela. Originally from Maracay, she moved to Caracas in 2020 to pursue a career in humor.
