= Capitolio TV =

Venezuelan television channel

- Type: Internet television
- Branding: Capitolio TV
- Country: Venezuela
- Availability: Venezuela
- Founded: 7 October 2016 by Miguel Ángel Rodríguez
- Launch date: 23 October 2016 (Start of transmissions); 29 October 2016 (Official)
- Picture format: 1080p
- Official website: Official website

Capitolio TV is a Venezuelan television channel established in 2016. It is headquartered at the Federal Legislative Palace in Caracas. The channel is owned and operated by the National Assembly of Venezuela. It was established after the old parliament decided to close Asamblea Nacional Televisión after the opposition led by Democratic Unity Roundtable won the majority of the seats in the 2015 Venezuelan parliamentary election; for that reason it was replaced by the National Audiovisual Television Foundation ANTV granting the concession to its workers.

== History ==
Capitolio TV was founded on October 7, 2016 through YouTube, and was scheduled to open on October 18, 2016. However, the signal did not air that day because officials of the Military House positioned in the adjacencies of the Federal Legislative Palace and there was a march of supporters of the ruling party in the vicinity of said palace.

Live broadcasting finally began on October 23, 2016 through YouTube live streaming. Having already more than a month of live transmission without interruptions, the official inauguration of the channel was held at the protocolary room of the National Assembly on November 29, 2016.

The President of the Permanent Commission of Popular Power and Media of the National Assembly, Deputy Tomás Guanipa, and the president of the Capitolio TV Foundation, Miguel Ángel Rodríguez announced that it is planned for 2017 to recover the signal taken from the pre-2015 National Assembly of Venezuela and negotiate with satellite and cable TV providers to add Capitolio TV to the channel grid.

== Logo ==
The logo of the channel has the Federal Legislative Palace, next to the Flag of Venezuela and 8 gold stars. The channel logo was released the same day of its presentation via live streaming.

== Censorship ==
During the 2017 Venezuelan protests, Venezuelan internet users reported several live streaming websites including VPItv and Capitolio TV were inaccessible on 7 April 2017.

== See also ==
- Television in Venezuela
- Asamblea Nacional Televisión
- National Assembly (Venezuela)
