= Annika Hernroth-Rothstein =

Swedish journalist (born 1981)

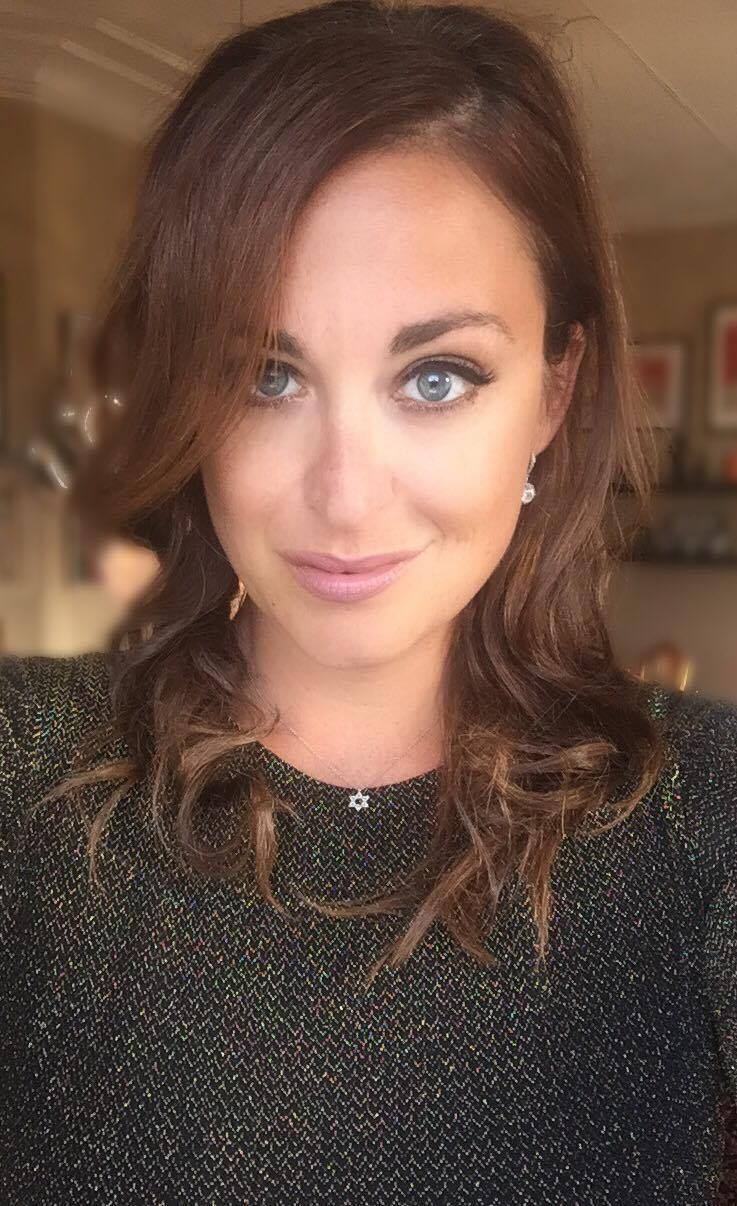
- Born: Annika Hernroth-Rothstein; 1981 (age 44–45)
- Education: Uppsala University, Linnaeus University
- Occupation: Pundit
- Website: annikahernroth.com

Annika Hernroth-Rothstein (born 1981) is a Swedish journalist and activist. In 2020, she published her first book, Exile: Portraits of the Jewish Diaspora. The Algemeiner Journal considered her one of the top 100 people positively influencing Jewish life.

She has made a significant impact through her work in addressing antisemitism, advocating for Jewish rights, and reporting on international political issues. With a background in media and Middle Eastern Studies, she served as a political advisor in Sweden and organized pro-Israel rallies, drawing attention to antisemitism. Her extensive travels included a notable visit to Iran, where she reported on the condition of Iranian Jews, and a trip to Venezuela, during which she faced threats and was briefly detained while reporting on the political situation.

== Early life and education ==
Hernroth-Rothstein is Jewish and attended Uppsala University and Linnaeus University where she attained a B.A. degree in Media and Communication as well as in Middle Eastern Studies.

== Career ==
Between 2013 and 2015, she worked as a political advisor for the Swedish liberal party, Folkpartiet, as part of the conservative political coalition “Alliansen”.

=== Political activism ===
She frequently writes on the issues of antisemitism both in Sweden and abroad. In September 2012, Hernroth-Rothstein organized a pro-Israel rally of almost 1500 people in the center of Stockholm. In 2013 she drew attention to alleged antisemitism in Sweden and to protest a series of measures in Sweden banning kosher slaughter, ritual circumcision, and possibly even the importation of kosher meat. In August 2013, Hernroth-Rothstein applied for political asylum in her own country of Sweden on the basis of religious persecution.

=== Iran ===
In 2016, she visited Iran during parliamentary elections. She visited several synagogues in Tehran and Hamedan and reported on the condition of Iranian Jews. She reported that Iranian authorities were aware of her Israeli ties and her political Zionist activities on the visa application but still granted her a visa. During interview with Israel Hayom, she reported that she was invited to the office of the supreme leader of Iran, Ali Khamenei, during the elections. She further reported that she was greeted personally by the President Hassan Rouhani several times. She reported her trip in an article entitled "Totalitarian terror in Iran" in The Tower Magazine.

=== Venezuela ===
In early 2019, she went to Venezuela, and reported that she was threatened, ransacked and beaten by paramilitary groups loyal to President Nicolás Maduro known as colectivos on 23 February 2019. She interviewed self-declared interim president Juan Guaido. Rothstein returned to Venezuela on 18 April 2019, but she was briefly detained at the airport by the Venezuelan National Guard (GNB) and was subsequently deported.

=== Political Analyst ===
In October 2021, high level political advisor and analyst, Hernroth-Rothstein joined Ghanaian economic policy think tank Institute for Fiscal Studies (IFS) as chief political analyst.

=== Advertising ===
In 2022, she joined advertising agency Nomad Ghana as CEO. While there, the agency won a number of prestigious awards.

== Awards and honors ==
The Algemeiner Journal selected Hernroth-Rothstein in their 2020 list of 100 people positively influencing Jewish life.

== Publications ==
- Hernroth-Rothstein, Annika (2020). Exile: Portraits of the Jewish Diaspora. Bombardier Books. ISBN 978-1642931877.
