= Alberto Federico Ravell =

Venezuelan journalist and businessman

Director of the National Center of Communications of Venezuela
- Incumbent
- Assumed office 23 April 2019
- President: Juan Guaidó (disputed)
- Preceded by: Position established

Personal details
- Born: Alberto Federico Ravell Arreaza; January 14, 1946 (age 80) Caracas, Venezuela
- Children: Juan Andrés Ravell
- Occupation: Journalist, Lawyer, Owner
- Known for: Co-founder of Globovisión

Alberto Federico Ravell Arreaza is a Venezuelan journalist, former CEO and co-founder of the news channel, Globovisión. Since 2019 and as of 2020, Ravell served as the director of the National Center of Communications of Venezuela for disputed interim president of Venezuela, Juan Guaidó.

== Early life ==
Between 1968–1969, Ravell created Angostura Radio and Radio Canaima. In 1973 he was appointed director of the media campaign belonging to Carlos Andrés Pérez. In 1974, when Pérez won the presidency, he was appointed director of the Central Information Office of the National Government.

In 1978 he was appointed director of the media election campaign of Piñerúa Luis Ordaz. In 1980, Ravell created advertising agency Eighth Art. In 1984 during the government of Jaime Lusinchi, he was named the director of Channel 8, Venezolana de Television.

== Career ==
Ravell helped the founding of Televen with Omar Camero, Guillermo Gonzalez and Gustavo Cisneros in 1988.

In 1991, together with Luis Guillermo Zuloaga and Teófilo Núñez, Ravell proceeded to apply for a license for UHF band channels; and in 1994 proposed the creation of a news channel in Venezuela. This channel was Globovisión on Channel 33. Ravell then served as CEO.

In 2010, the majority shareholders television station asked for the resignation of the directors of Globovisión. Ravell then left Globovisión. According to Semana, in information published through WikiLeaks from the United States Embassy in Venezuela, the Venezuelan government pressured a banker, Nelson Mezerhane, to buy all the shares of Globovisión in order to fire Ravell. Ravell made the original allegations of the Venezuelan government's pressure and United States officials in Caracas "confirmed the thesis of Ravell".

On 11 June 2010 Ravell created a news site, called La Patilla. La Patilla is currently one of the top visited news websites in Venezuela, ranked more popular than El Universal, Globovisión and El Nacional.

On August 5, 2011 Alberto Federico Ravell purchased a small subscription television channel in Colombia called Cable Noticias. The channel operated out of Bogotá, Colombia.

On 23 April 2019, Guaidó named Ravell as his spokesman and director of the National Center of Communications of Venezuela, Guaidó's information and media board.

== Personal life ==
Federico Ravell is cousin of the former Vice President and foreign minister of Venezuela, Jorge Arreaza.
