= Osmary Hernández =

Venezuelan journalist

- Occupation: Journalist
- Employer: CNN en Español
- Awards: News Emmy Award; Documentary for Best Spanish-language Newscast or News Magazine

Osmary Hernández is a Venezuelan journalist and correspondent for CNN en Español.

== Career ==
Hernández has been nominated for the Documentary for Outstanding Coverage of a Breaking News Story in Spanish, and has been awarded the News Emmy Award and the Documentary for Best Newscast or News Magazine in Spanish. On 13 January 2019, she was detained by the Bolivarian Intelligence Service (SEBIN), along with Caracol Televisión journalist Beatriz Adrián, while reporting on the detention of the president of the Venezuelan National Assembly, Juan Guaidó. They were released afterwards.
