= Cable Noticias =

- Country: Colombia
- Headquarters: Bogotá and Medellín

Programming
- Language: Spanish
- Picture format: 480i (SDTV)

Ownership
- Owner: Alberto Federico Ravell

History
- Launched: October 2007

Links
- Website: www.cablenoticias.tv

Cable Noticias (stylized as "cablenoticias") is a Colombian 24-hour cable television news channel owned by Medellín-based company Global Media. On August 5, 2011 Alberto Federico Ravell purchased Cable Noticias. The channel operates out of Bogotá, Colombia.
