= Runrunes =

Venezuelan news and opinion website

- Website type: News site
- Available in: Spanish
- Website: runrun.es
- Registration: None
- Launched: 2010
- Current status: Active

Runrunes (English: Rumors) is a news, opinion and analysis website dedicated to Venezuelan topics. The website was founded by Venezuelan investigative journalist Nelson Bocaranda.

== History ==
Journalist Nelson Bocaranda had a weekday show, "Los Runrunes de Nelson" or "The Rumors of Nelson", which began on Unión Radio in 1998. "Los Runrunes de Nelson" was cancelled in 2009 after the Venezuelan government reportedly said that it would revoke Unión Radio's license if Bocaranda's criticism continued. The following year, Bocaranda and his son created the Runrunes website. The website began as personal columns posted by Bocaranda surrounding the illness of Hugo Chávez, with the coverage being responsible for Bocaranda's increased social media following.

== Demographics ==
Runrunes' main visitors are from Venezuela, the United States and Spain.

== Censorship and attacks ==
Runrunes has had multiple controversies with the Venezuelan government. Diosdado Cabello, a high-ranking Venezuelan official, intimidated a journalist of the website on his television program, criticizing their work. In January 2016, Bocaranda was detained for nearly 2 hours at Maiquetia International Airport while authorities checked his phone. On 6 May 2016, Bocaranda's Twitter account was hacked with the hacker attempting to discredit the journalist.

Runrunes servers were disrupted from cyberattacks coming from Russia on 28 May 2019.

Access to Runrunes was disrupted by CANTV, the state internet provider on 17 May 2020.
