= TV Venezuela =

Venezuelan cable television channel

TVVenezuela
- Country: Venezuela
- Broadcast area: United States

History
- Founded: December 2005
- Launched: January 11, 2006

Links
- Website: TV Venezuela

TV Venezuela (also known as TVV) is a Venezuelan-American television channel airing in the United States for the Venezuelan diaspora, featuring programming from various Venezuelan television networks. The network was created to fill in a void in the US Hispanic market, for the Venezuelan diaspora.

== History ==
TV Venezuela was announced in November 2005, with a tentative launch date set for December. Its initial partners were Globovisión, Meridiano Televisión, RCTV and regional stations. On January 10, 2006, the channel was added to DirecTV's Spanish-language packages in the United States.

Following the closure of RCTV, it was one of the outlets that aired El Observador in its three daily editions. In July, the channel was made available on Comcast systems in South Florida, alongside sister outlet SUR Perú. In November, it aired that year's constitutional referendum in simulcast with Canal SUR.

Nathaly Salas Guaithero was named its general director, who was in charge of the channel's current affairs programming.
