= Isla Presidencial =

Venezuelan web animation page

Isla presidencial (English: Presidential Island) is an adult web animation page from Venezuela. The political satire follows the heads of state of Latin America and Spain who are stranded on an island. The three seasons amassed more than 50 million views on YouTube.

== Plot ==
Scene from the episode "El Avión" (The Airplane), from left to right, Hugo Chávez, Evo Morales, Luiz Inácio Lula da Silva, Rafael Correa and Cristina Fernández de Kirchner.

Several presidents met at the 74º Ibero-American Summit, and have a cruise after it. The cruise crashes with an big rock, and all the presidents arrive at a desert paradise island. The episodes focus on their attempts to survive in the wild or escape from the island. Some presidents who were not included in the first episodes were added later, with a plane crash.

Hugo Chávez disappears from the island, kidnapped by Barack Obama for unmentioned reasons. A malfunctioning robot that impersonates Chávez leaves Obama's secret base, until he manages to turn him off. Two presidents died during an attack of "Chávez-raptors" (savage hybrid dinosaurs with the face of Chávez), and they are finally rescued at the end of the second season.

At the beginning of the third season, the presidents are stranded on another island free of dinosaurs. Several presidents were killed off in the first and second season (corresponding to the end of their terms in real life). The show parodies pop culture, such as Jurassic Park and El Chavo del Ocho.

== Production ==
Almost all of the characters were voiced by Emilio Lovera. The third season was released on NuevOn, one of the YouTube Original Channels.

== Characters ==
=== Season 1 ===
- Hugo Chávez VEN
- Evo Morales BOL
- Sebastian Piñera CHI
- Juan Carlos I of Spain SPA
- Daniel Ortega NIC
- Cristina Fernández de Kirchner ARG
- Rafael Correa ECU
- José Mujica URU
- Juan Manuel Santos COL
- Barack Obama USA
- Michelle Bachelet CHI †
- Alan García PER †
- José Luis Rodríguez Zapatero SPA †
- Luiz Inácio Lula da Silva BRA †
- Felipe Calderón MEX †
- Fernando Lugo PAR †
- Manuel Zelaya HON †
- Álvaro Uribe COL (Escaped from the island)

=== Season 2 ===
- Nicolás Maduro VEN
- Evo Morales BOL
- Juan Manuel Santos COL
- Juan Carlos I of Spain SPA
- Daniel Ortega NIC
- Rafael Correa ECU
- José Mujica URU
- Enrique Peña Nieto MEX
- Mariano Rajoy SPA
- Dilma Rousseff BRA
- Sebastián Piñera CHI
- Barack Obama USA
- Hugo Chávez VEN †
- Cristina Fernández de Kirchner ARG †
- Ollanta Humala PER †

=== Season 3 ===
- Nicolás Maduro VEN
- Evo Morales BOL
- Juan Manuel Santos COL
- Juan Carlos I of Spain SPA
- Daniel Ortega NIC
- Rafael Correa ECU
- José Mujica URU
- Enrique Peña Nieto MEX
- Mariano Rajoy SPA
- Dilma Rousseff BRA
- Barack Obama USA

== Reactions ==
Hugo Chávez mentioned an episode of the series to Evo Morales in 2011, with ABC News quoting him: "You've got to see this show, Evo!" Chávez boomed to his staff, laughing about how Morales was left snoring while "Hugito" sang until sun-up. "They sound just like us!"

Nicolás Maduro, president of Venezuela, was portrayed as a man of limited intelligence, twisted speech, and capable of talking with birds, the latter being a reference to a comment made by Maduro during the 2013 elections in Venezuela, when he said that the late Chávez had reincarnated in a little bird and talked to him to bless his candidacy. He criticized his portrayal in the animation. He said that it was not an accurate representation of his face, his moustache or his voice.
