= La Patilla =

Venezuelan news website

- Website type: Online newspaper
- Available in: Spanish
- Owner: Alberto Federico Ravell
- Editor: David Moran
- Website: lapatilla.com
- Registration: None
- Users: +4.5 million (monthly, September 2015)
- Launched: June 11, 2010; 16 years ago
- Current status: Active

La Patilla (English: The Watermelon) is a Venezuelan news website that was founded by Alberto Federico Ravell, co-founder and former CEO of Globovisión, in 2010. In 2014, El Nuevo Herald stated La Patilla had hundreds of thousands of visitors per daily. Beginning in early 2018, the website has been censored in Venezuela by the Nicolás Maduro government.

== History ==
La Patilla was created by co-founder and former CEO of Globovisión, Alberto Federico Ravell. In 2010, Ravell resigned from Globovisión's board of directors. He created La Patilla the same year. BBC Monitoring described La Patilla in 2019 as leading among news sources that are "often run by media critics of the government who had been forced to leave their previous journalist jobs because of government pressure and harassment".

=== Growth ===
In 2014, the Wall Street Journal wrote that Venezuelans "have been forced to find alternatives as newspapers and broadcasters struggle with state efforts to control coverage", with a growing trend of Venezuelans using online news media to bypass government censors. Journalists and press-freedom advocates stated that news websites like La Patilla "have helped fill a gap" since those linked to the Venezuelan government had purchased media organizations in Venezuela, such as El Universal, Globovisión and Últimas Noticias. In an article in The Wall Street Journal discussing the rising popularity of news websites in Venezuela, La Patilla CEO Ravell stated that, "The editorial line of La Patilla is to call it like it is ... We don't need paper. We don't need a broadcasting license. There's little they can do to squeeze us."

In 2019, Alexa ranked La Patilla as the 16th most popular website in Venezuela.

== Demographics ==
Initially after La Patilla's launch, its readership was primarily from postgraduate educated individuals. In 2015, La Patilla was primarily visited by those who were both college educated and not collegiately educated. One of the primary browsing locations for users was at school and at work. By 2018, according to Alexa, visitors were primarily college educated or in graduate school, with homes and work places becoming the main browsing locations while visits from schools declined.

== Reception ==
In 2013, Freedom House described La Patilla as having a pro-opposition stance. The Wall Street Journal described the website as a news aggregator.

== Attacks ==
=== Censorship ===
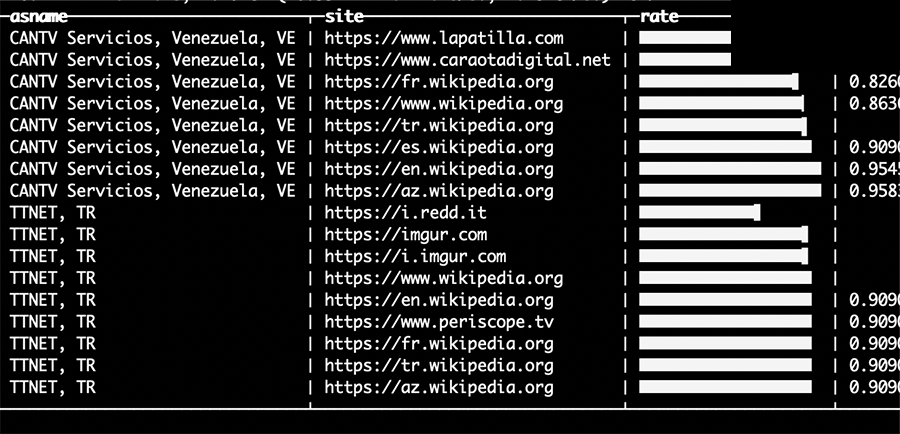
Netblocks showing the censorship of websites including La Patilla and Wikipedia by CANTV

On 17 May 2012, La Patilla was covering violent clashes occurring at a Venezuelan prison, La Planta, through a live stream video feed. Visitors of La Patilla reported that the website was experiencing "irregularities" and thought it was due to technical problems. It was discovered later that La Patilla was blocked by the government-run CANTV. CANTV blocked La Patilla's original IP address and after La Patilla changed its IP address, CANTV blocked it again. Readers of La Patilla criticized the blockage by CANTV saying it was a "violation of their right to information". Readers also assumed the blockage by the government was due to the coverage of the prison clashes. David Moran, editor of La Patilla stated that "Censorship has been multidimensional against us".

Weeks after the Venezuelan presidential election in 2018, La Patilla had their Hypertext Transfer Protocol censored from 6 June 2018 to 11 June 2018 by the state-run CANTV and private internet service providers who were complying with government regulations. Since June 2018, CANTV has blocked access to La Patilla.

=== On reporters ===
On 22 April 2014, reporters from La Patilla, who were covering events in Santa Fe, were retained by the National Guard. The reporters were accused of being "fake journalists", had to show their ID's to the National Guardsmen and had their pictures taken. They were later released without further complications. On 12 May 2014, a photojournalist from La Patilla was assaulted by National Police who tried to take his camera and hit him in the head with the butt of a shotgun while he covering protests in Las Mercedes. A week later on 20 May 2014, the same La Patilla photojournalist was assaulted by the National Police who tried to take his camera while covering protests in the Las Minitas neighborhood in Baruta. On 27 May 2014, a reporter for La Patilla was shot in the arm by a National Guardsman while covering clashes in Táchira. In April 2017, a La Patilla reporter was shot in the leg at close range with a tear gas canister, fracturing his tibia.

=== Diosdado Cabello ===
On 11 August 2015, then President of the National Assembly, Diosdado Cabello, sued La Patilla and other media organizations for reporting that he was being investigated for his ties to drug trafficking and his alleged role in the Cartel of the Suns. On 31 May 2017, Bolivarian official Pedro Carreño leaked a document prior to trial of a decision by Venezuelan courts to award Cabello 1 billion bolívares (US$500,000 in May 2017). Cabello stated that with the money, "I am going to pay the lawyers and I will give that to the poor children". The lawyer for La Patilla, Alejandra Rodríguez, stated that "to publish the contents of a judicial act in the middle of a controversy, of which Pedro Carreño is not a party, invalidates the judicial proceedings ... If that decision is true, it would demonstrate once again that in Venezuela there is no separation of powers and that the Judiciary is an appendage of the United Socialist Party of Venezuela".

In June 2019, La Patilla was charged and fined 30 billion sovereign bolivars (about $5 million) after publishing an Diario ABC article that mentioned the president of the pro-Maduro 2017 Constituent National Assembly, Diosdado Cabello, in relation to drug trafficking in Venezuela. La Patilla's director Ravell, supporter of Juan Guaidó during the presidential crisis, wrote that Cabello was engaging in "judicial terrorism". Cabello stated that he would take control of the website if it was unable to pay the fine. Cabello had previously tried to raise judicial processes against ABC and The Wall Street Journal for accusations of drug trafficking, but the cases were rejected. Nathalie Southwick (CPJ) said that the measure taken against La Patilla was an "attempt to bankrupt and shut down a critical outlet" and provided an "example of how the Venezuelan judicial system is being used to retaliate against critical media".

== See also ==
- Efecto Cocuyo
- Prodavinci
