= VIVOplay =

Venezuelan online television channel

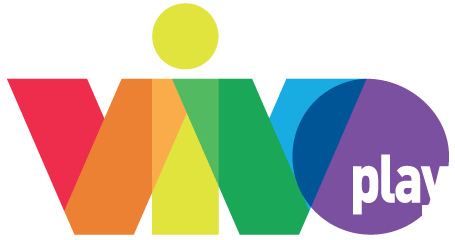
- Website type: News site, Internet TV
- Available in: Spanish
- Headquarters: {{{location_country}}}
- Website: www.vivoplay.net
- Current status: Online

VIVOplay is a Venezuelan online television channel. It was founded in 2013. Since 2015, it incorporates original productions.

VIVOplay is available for media players such as Roku, Amazon Fire TV, Chromecast, Apple TV, and Android TV, both on TVs and external players such as Xiaomi Mi Box S and NVIDIA Shield TV; mobile devices with Android, Windows Phone and iOS operating systems (including iPadOS); and web browsers such as Google Chrome, Mozilla Firefox, Internet Explorer, Microsoft Edge, Safari, and Opera.

In 2021, the platform stopped free-to-air streaming of VIVOplay's original signal for Venezuela.

== See also ==
- Television in Venezuela
