= Crisis in Venezuela =

Socioeconomic and political conjuncture in 21st century Venezuela

- Part of Aftermath of Great Recession in South America
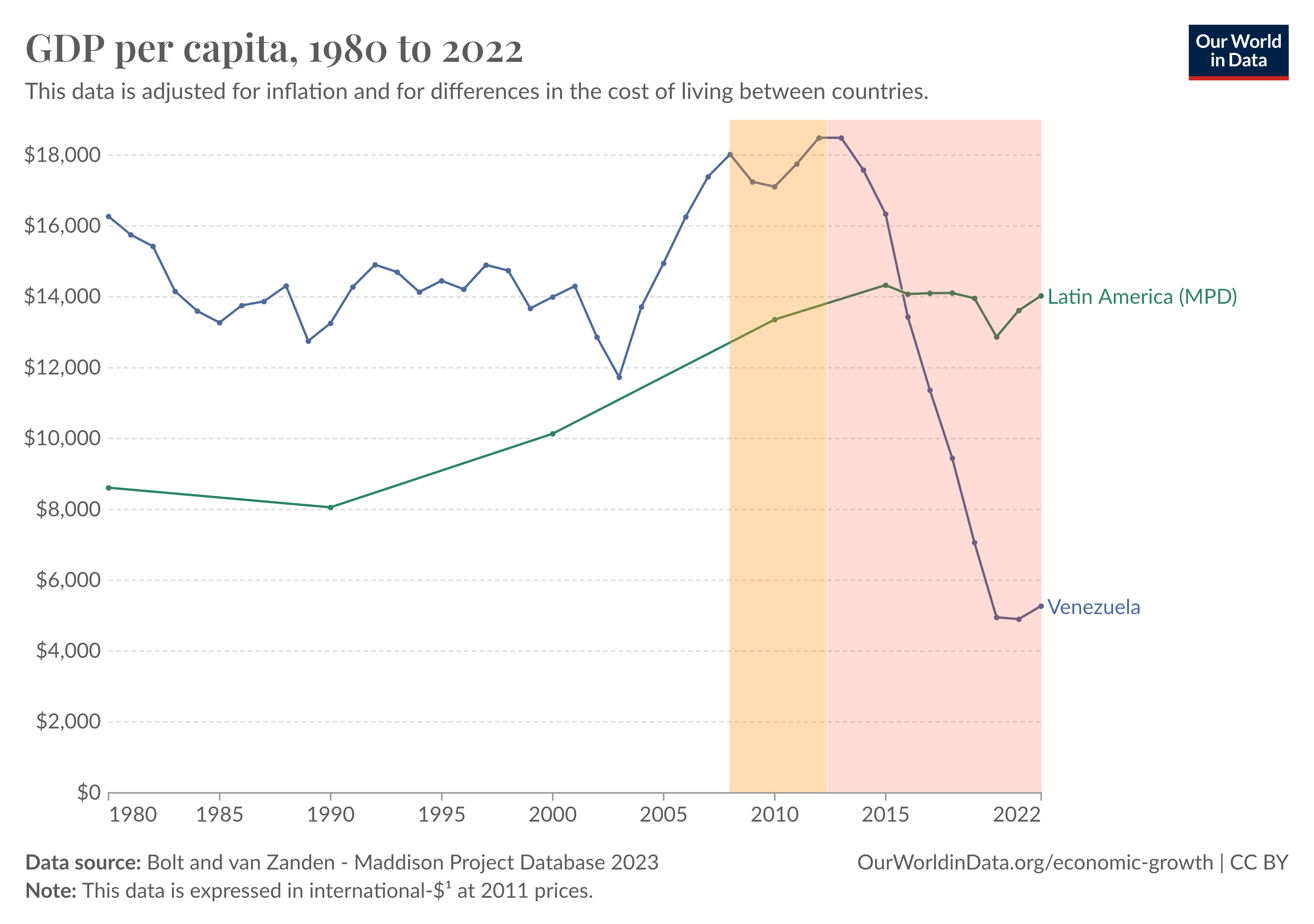
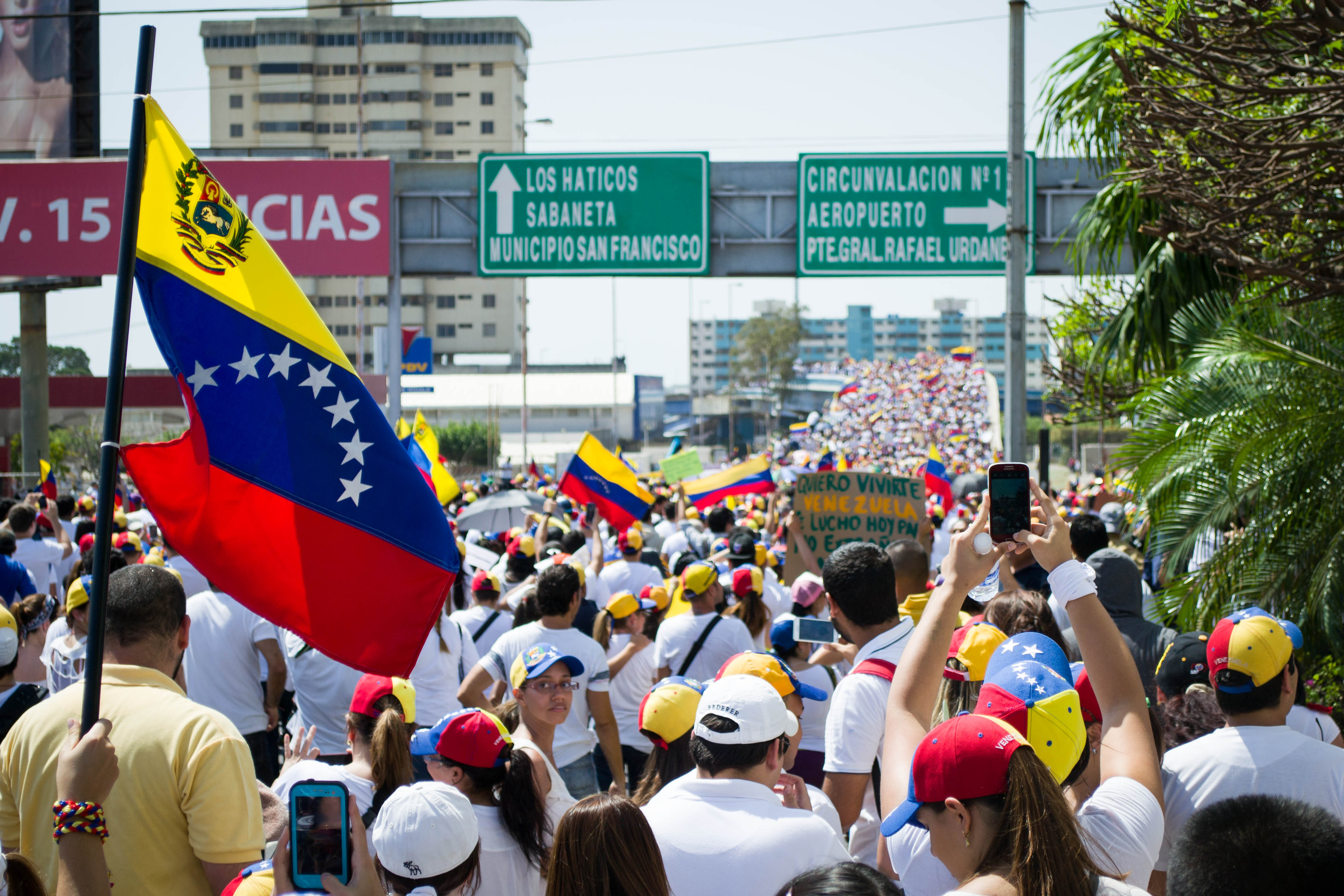
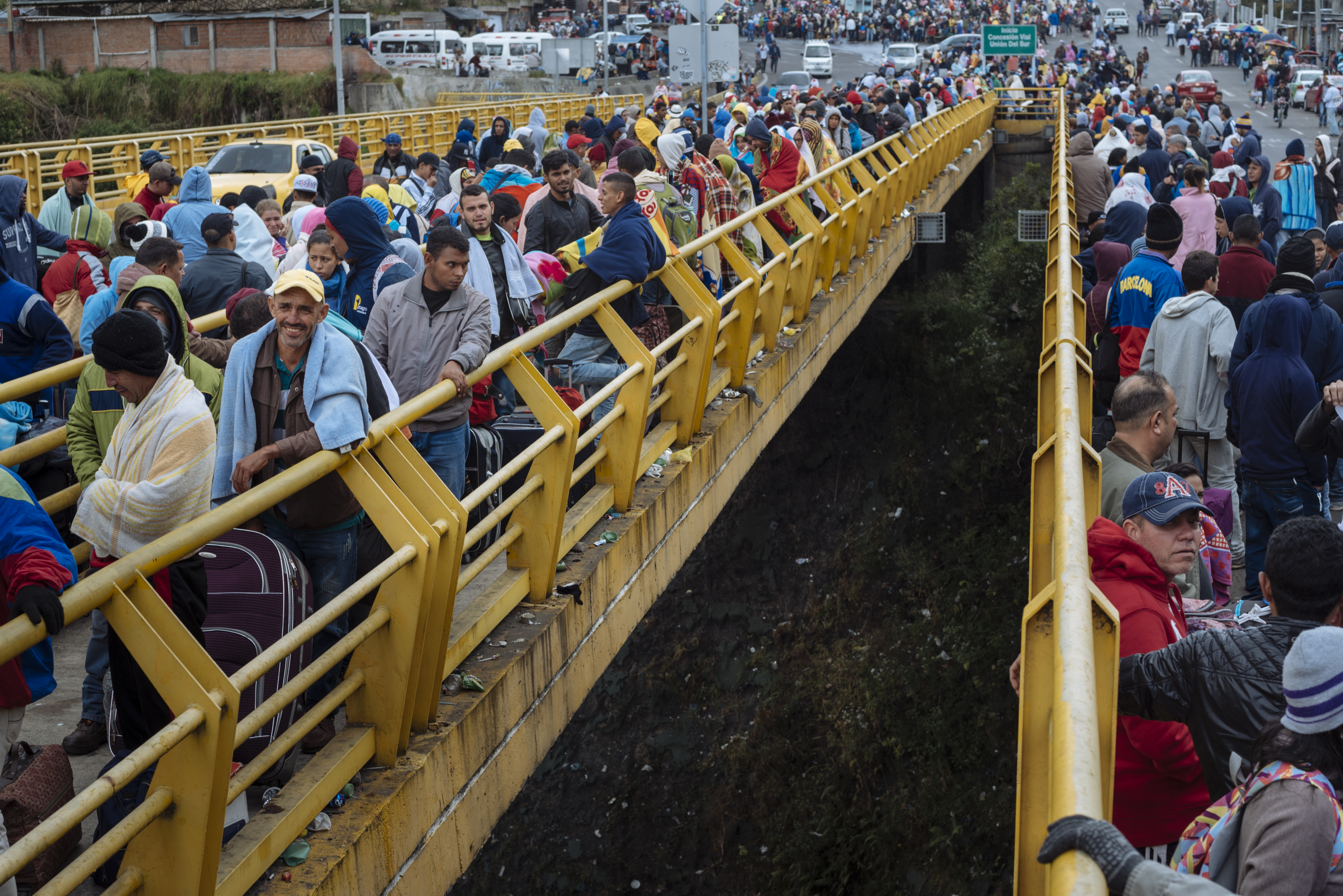
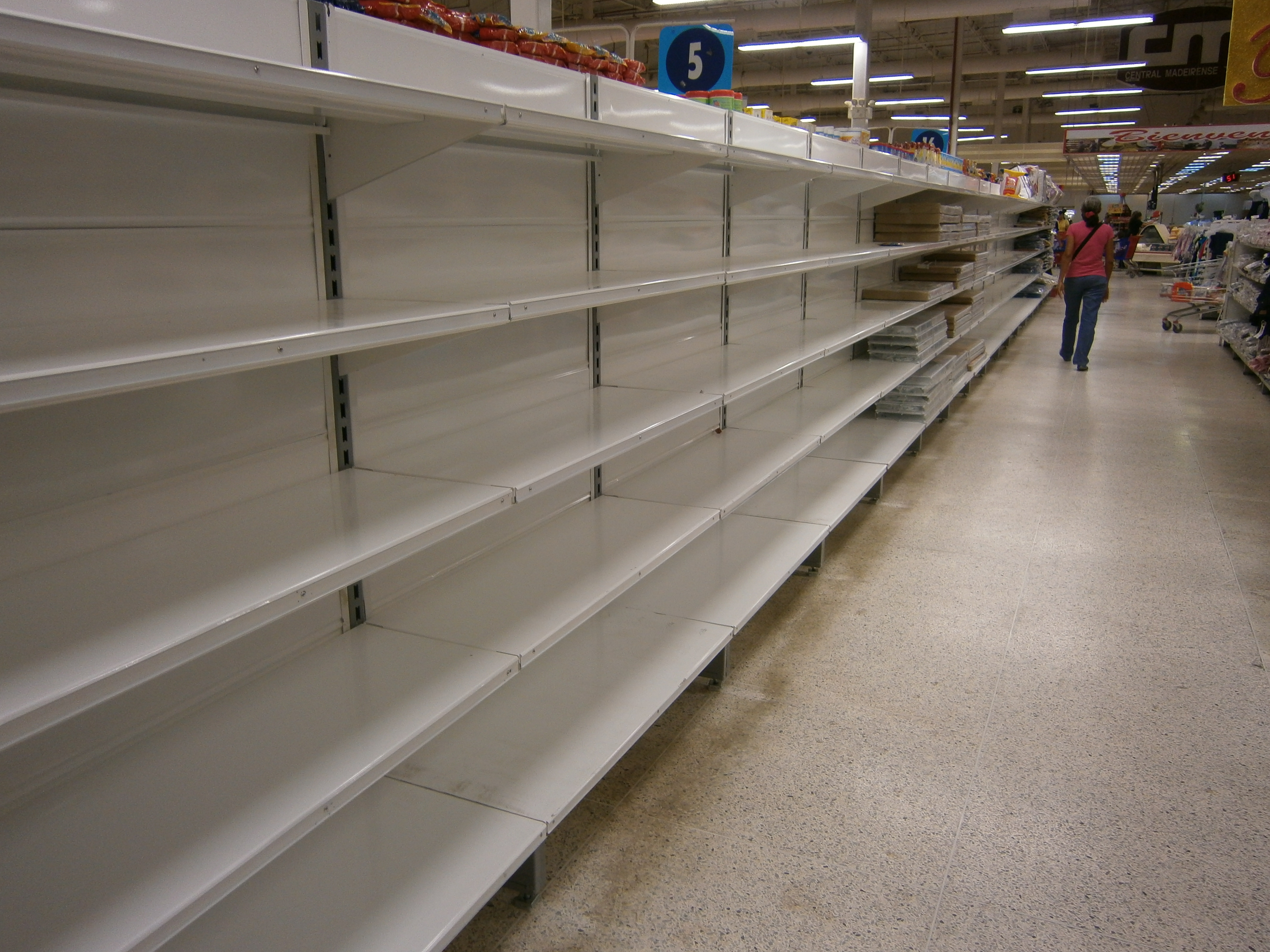
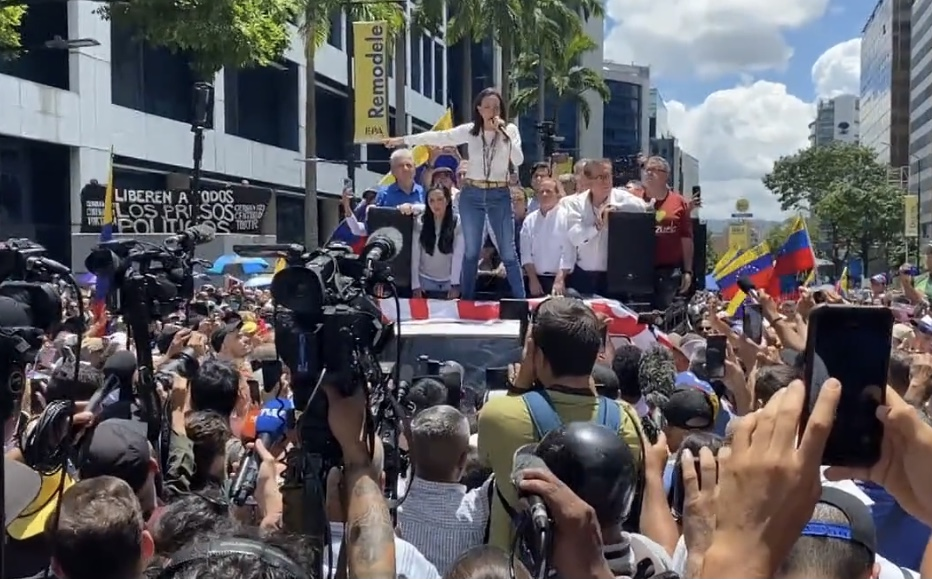
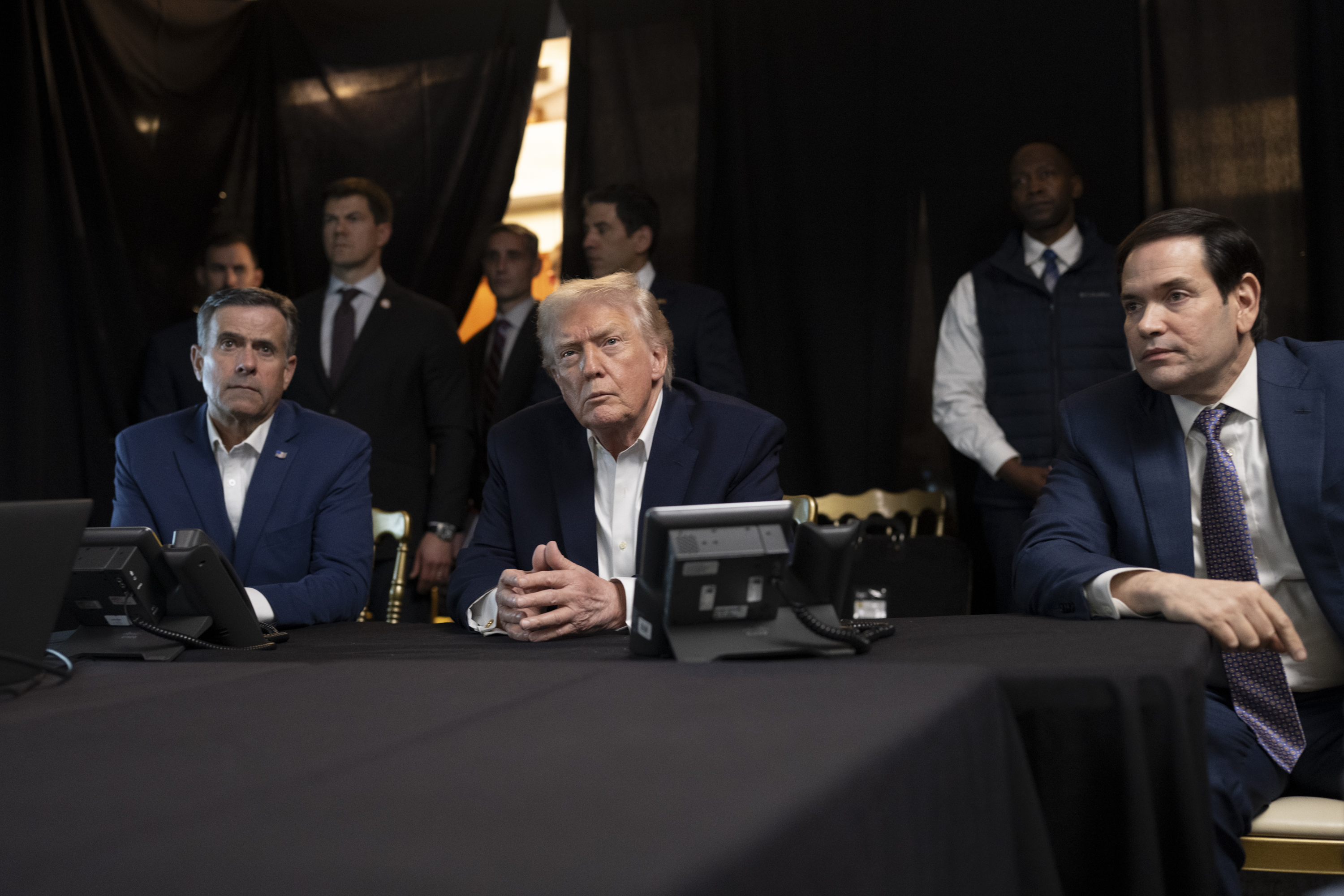
- Clockwise from top-left: Graph showing Venezuela's economic stagnation and the annual decline of GDP per capita; Protests against Nicolás Maduro in Maracaibo; Hundreds of Venezuelans waiting to stamp their passports in an Ecuadorian customs house; Supermarket shelves empty due to shortage; María Corina Machado leading a protest after the results of the 2024 election; US president Donald Trump with members of his cabinet at Mar-a-Lago during Operation Absolute Resolve
- Date: 2 June 2010 – present (16 years, 5 months, 2 weeks and 4 days)
- Location: Venezuela
- Caused by: Continued decline in oil prices since the 2008 financial crisis; Economic policies of the Chávez and Maduro governments; Economic sanctions
- Goals: Regime change and removal of Bolivarian Republic of Venezuela; Restoration of diplomatic relations with the United States
- Status: Ongoing: President Nicolás Maduro captured by US forces in 2026; Delcy Rodríguez assumes presidency in an acting capacity, Maduro loyalists are purged, Chavismo government remains in place

Parties
Venezuelan opposition; MUD / PU; National Assembly of Venezuela (IV Legislature); Supreme Tribunal of Justice of Venezuela in exile; National Armed Forces of Venezuela (defected); Venezuelan Army (defected); Venezuelan Air Force (defected); Venezuelan Navy (defected); Venezuelan National Guard (defected); Venezuelan National Police (defected); Supporting parties: Vente Venezuela; Justice First; Popular Will; Radical Cause; Project Venezuela; National Convergence; Copei (de jure); Democratic Action (de jure); A New Era; Fearless People's Alliance; Red Flag Party (de jure); Communist Party of Venezuela (since 2020); Ecological Movement of Venezuela; Neighborhood Force; Progressive Advance; Student Movement; Episcopal Conference of Venezuela; Resistance groups; United States	Government of Venezuela; GPPSB; National Assembly of Venezuela (III, V and VI Legislature); Constituent National Assembly (2017–2020); Supreme Tribunal of Justice; National Electoral Council; National Bolivarian Armed Forces of Venezuela; Bolivarian National Police; SEBIN; GDMC; Cartel of the Suns (Note: Alleged by the United States. While the involvement of various Venezuelan government and military officials with drug cartels has been documented, independent experts dispute the existence of an organised cartel run by these officials.); Supporting parties: United Socialist Party of Venezuela; Fatherland for All; Tupamaro; For Social Democracy; Republican Bicentennial Vanguard; Venezuelan Popular Unity; Alliance for Change (since 2015); People's Electoral Movement; We Are Venezuela Movement; Networks Party; Authentic Renewal Organization; Venezuelan Revolutionary Currents; Communist Party of Venezuela (until 2020); Pro-Maduro groups: Colectivos; La Piedrita; Wagner Group; National Liberation Army; Units of Battle Hugo Chávez

Lead figures
(Venezuela) María Corina Machado; (Venezuela) Edmundo González; (Venezuela) Leopoldo López; (Venezuela) Juan Guaidó; (Venezuela) Juan Pablo Guanipa; (Venezuela) Henrique Capriles; (Venezuela) Óscar Pérez †; (Venezuela) Juan Requesens; (Venezuela) Roberto Marrero; (Venezuela) Henry Ramos Allup; (Venezuela) Julio Borges; (Venezuela) Delsa Solórzano; (Venezuela) Antonio Ledezma; (Venezuela) Lilian Tintori; (Venezuela) Manuel Rosales; (Venezuela) Henrique Salas Römer; (Venezuela) Lorenzo Mendoza; (Venezuela) Domingo Hernández Larez; (Venezuela) Manuel Cristopher Figuera; (Holy See) Baltazar Porras; (Holy See) Raúl Biord Castillo; (Venezuela) Juan Caguaripano; (Venezuela) Freddy Superlano; (Venezuela) Jesús Torrealba; (Venezuela) Tomás Guanipa; (Venezuela) Carlos Ocariz; (Venezuela) Andrés Velásquez; (Venezuela) Yon Goicoechea; (Venezuela) Miguel Pizarro; (United States) Donald Trump (United States) Marco Rubio (United States) Dan Caine (United States) Pete Hegseth	(Venezuela) Hugo Chávez #; (Venezuela) Nicolás Maduro (until 2026); (Venezuela) Delcy Rodríguez; (Venezuela) Diosdado Cabello; (Venezuela) Yván Gil; (Venezuela) Jorge Rodríguez; (Venezuela) Vladimir Padrino López; (Venezuela) Tarek William Saab; (Venezuela) Elvis Amoroso; (Venezuela) Iván Hernández Dala; (Venezuela) Gustavo González López; (Venezuela) Tareck El Aissami (until 2023); (Venezuela) Cilia Flores (until 2026); (Venezuela) Nicolás Maduro Guerra; (Venezuela) Jorge Arreaza; (Venezuela) Elías Jaua; (Venezuela) Héctor Rodríguez Castro; (Venezuela) Aristóbulo Istúriz #; (Venezuela) Néstor Reverol; (Venezuela) Carmen Meléndez; (Venezuela) Luisa Ortega Díaz (until 2017); (Venezuela) Tibisay Lucena #; (Venezuela) Jorge García Carneiro #; (Venezuela) Pedro Tellechea (until 2024); (Venezuela) Alex Saab; (Venezuela) Iris Varela; (Venezuela) Ernesto Villegas; (Venezuela) Freddy Bernal; (Venezuela) Caryslia Rodríguez; (Venezuela) Maikel Moreno; (Venezuela) Gladys Gutiérrez

Casualties and losses
- 374+ deaths in protests 12,620+ detentions 9,100,000+ displaced as of 17 May 2025

An ongoing socioeconomic and political crisis began in Venezuela during the presidencies of Hugo Chávez, Nicolás Maduro as well as Delcy Rodríguez. It has been marked by hyperinflation, starvation, disease, crime, and mortality rates, resulting in massive emigration. Food shortages and hyperinflation have ended, but inflation remains high. It is the worst economic crisis in Venezuela's history and considered by some sources as more severe than the Great Depression in the United States, the 1985–1994 Brazilian economic crisis, or the 2008–2009 hyperinflation in Zimbabwe. In 2019, the Institute of International Finance called it the single largest economic collapse outside of war in 45 years. Writers have compared aspects, such as unemployment and GDP contraction, to Bosnia and Herzegovina after the 1992–95 Bosnian War, and those in Russia, Cuba and Albania following the Revolutions of 1989.

In 2010, Chávez declared an "economic war" due to increasing shortages in Venezuela. The crisis intensified under the Maduro government, growing more severe as a result of low oil prices, and a drop in oil production from lack of maintenance and investment. In 2016, the opposition-led National Assembly declared a "health humanitarian crisis." The government failed to cut spending in the face of falling oil revenues, denying the existence of a crisis, and violently repressed opposition. Extrajudicial killings by the government became common, with the UN reporting 5,287 killings by the Special Action Forces in 2017, with another 1,569 killings in the first half of 2019, stating some were "a reprisal for participation in anti-government demonstrations."

The European Union, the Lima Group, the US and other countries have applied sanctions against officials and members of the military and security forces, as a response to human rights abuses, degradation of the rule of law, and corruption. In 2017, the US extended its sanctions. These blocked oil exports, paralyzed the Venezuelan economy, froze Venezuelan financial assets and blocked the country's access to international payments systems. According to a 2019 report by Mark Weisbrot and Jeffrey Sachs, sanctions caused Venezuela a loss of $38 billion between 2016 and 2019, prevented the government from resolving the crisis using fiscal and monetary policy changes, and in combination with preexisting negative trends resulted in an estimated 40,000 excess deaths between 2017 and 2018. The report's methodology and conclusions were criticized by other economists.

Supporters of Chávez and Maduro said the problems result from an "economic war" on Venezuela falling oil prices, international sanctions, and the business elite. Most observers cite anti-democratic governance, political corruption, authoritarianism, human rights violations, high dependence on oil, and gross mismanagement of the economy as causes. Others attribute the crisis to the "socialist", "populist", or "hyper-populist" nature of the government's policies, and the use of these to maintain political power.

The crisis has affected the life of the average Venezuelan at all levels. By 2017, hunger had escalated to the point where almost 75% of the population had lost an average of 9 kg (over 19 lbs), (Note: Venezuela's Living Conditions Survey (ENCOVI) found nearly 75% of the population had lost an average of at least 8.7 kg (19.4 lb) in weight due to a lack of proper nutrition.) and more than half did not have enough income to meet basic food needs. 20% of Venezuelans (5.4 million) had left the country by 2021, and 7.7 million had emigrated by 2024. In 2019, 25% of Venezuelans needed some form of humanitarian assistance. 95% of the population by 2021 was living in poverty, and 77% lived under extreme poverty, the highest ever recorded in the country. Following increased sanctions throughout 2019, the Maduro government abandoned policies established by Chávez such as price and currency controls, which resulted in the country seeing a temporary rebound from economic decline before COVID. By 2019, as a response to the devaluation of the official bolívar currency, the population increasingly relied on US dollars for transactions. In 2022, after the implementation of mild economic liberalization, poverty decreased slightly and the economy grew for the first time in 8 years. The reforms intensified inequality, with Venezuela reaching the highest level of inequality in the Americas.

The United States intervention in Venezuela on 3 January 2026 resulted in the capture of Maduro and the assumption of the Venezuelan presidency by Delcy Rodríguez. According to The New York Times, Venezuela has been a de facto puppet state since the intervention, with the US State Department under Marco Rubio exercising control over core aspects of Venezuela's governance, including its domestic finances, government appointments, revenues, foreign policy, and the distribution of its natural resources. Venezuela's quarterly GDP growth rate of 2.5% in the immediate aftermath of the attack was its lowest in five years.

== History ==
=== Chávez presidency ===
After attempting a coup d'état in 1992 and being pardoned by President Rafael Caldera, Hugo Chávez was elected president and maintained the presidency from 1999 until his death in 2013. After increasing oil prices in the early 2000s provided additional funds to Venezuela, Chávez established Bolivarian missions, aimed at providing public services to improve economic, cultural, and social conditions. The Missions entailed the construction of thousands of free medical clinics for the poor, and the enactment of food and housing subsidies. A 2010 OAS report indicated achievements in addressing illiteracy, healthcare and poverty, and economic and social advances. Quality of life for Venezuelans had also improved. While poverty declined more than 20 percent between 2002 and 2008, "aid was disbursed to some of the poor...in a way that ended up helping the president and his allies and cronies more than anyone else", according to Corrales and Penfold. Teresa A. Meade wrote that Chávez's popularity strongly depended "on the lower classes who have benefited from these health initiatives and similar policies."

The social works initiated by Chávez's government relied on oil exports. The nation's richness in natural resources hindered its industrial development and diversification. (Note: Javier Corrales says in Foreign Policy, "...excessive dependence on commodity exports can distort an economy in fundamental ways. One manifestation of this principle is what has come to be known as 'Dutch Disease' (named after the problems faced by the Netherlands as it reaped a windfall from North Sea oil in the 1970s). Dutch Disease occurs when a country that is excessively dependent on commodity exports experiences a price boom. The sudden inflow of foreign currency raises the demand for local currency, yielding an uncompetitive exchange rate. This overvalued exchange rate, if unaddressed, can kill the country's other exports as well as stimulating an avalanche of imports, which can hurt domestic producers.") By the early 2010s, economic actions taken by Chávez's government during the preceding decade, such as overspending and price controls, became unsustainable. Venezuela's economy faltered while poverty, inflation and shortages increased. On 2 June 2010, Chávez declared an "economic war" due to increasing shortages in Venezuela.

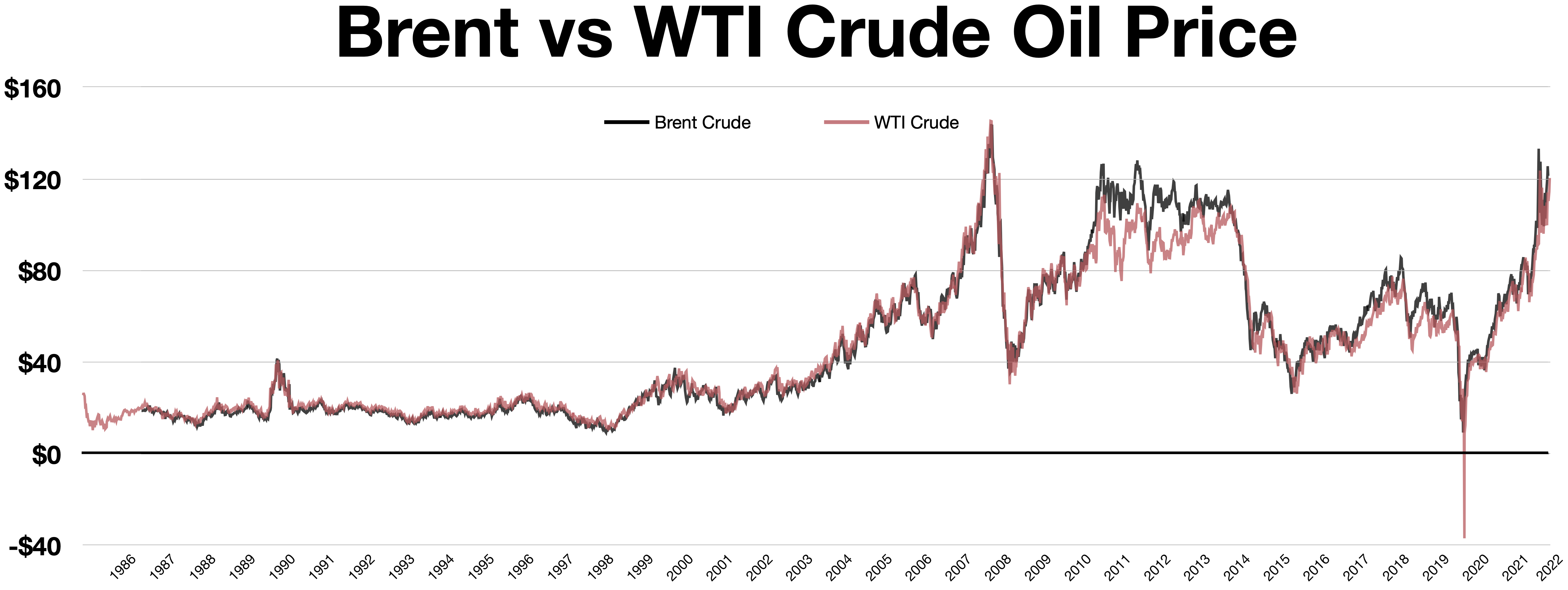
The world oil price had fallen to a historic low when Chavez was elected in December 1998 and rose over 1000% over the first ten years of his presidency. Major crisis events occur after the 2008 oil price collapse and ensuing period of volatility.

=== Maduro presidency ===
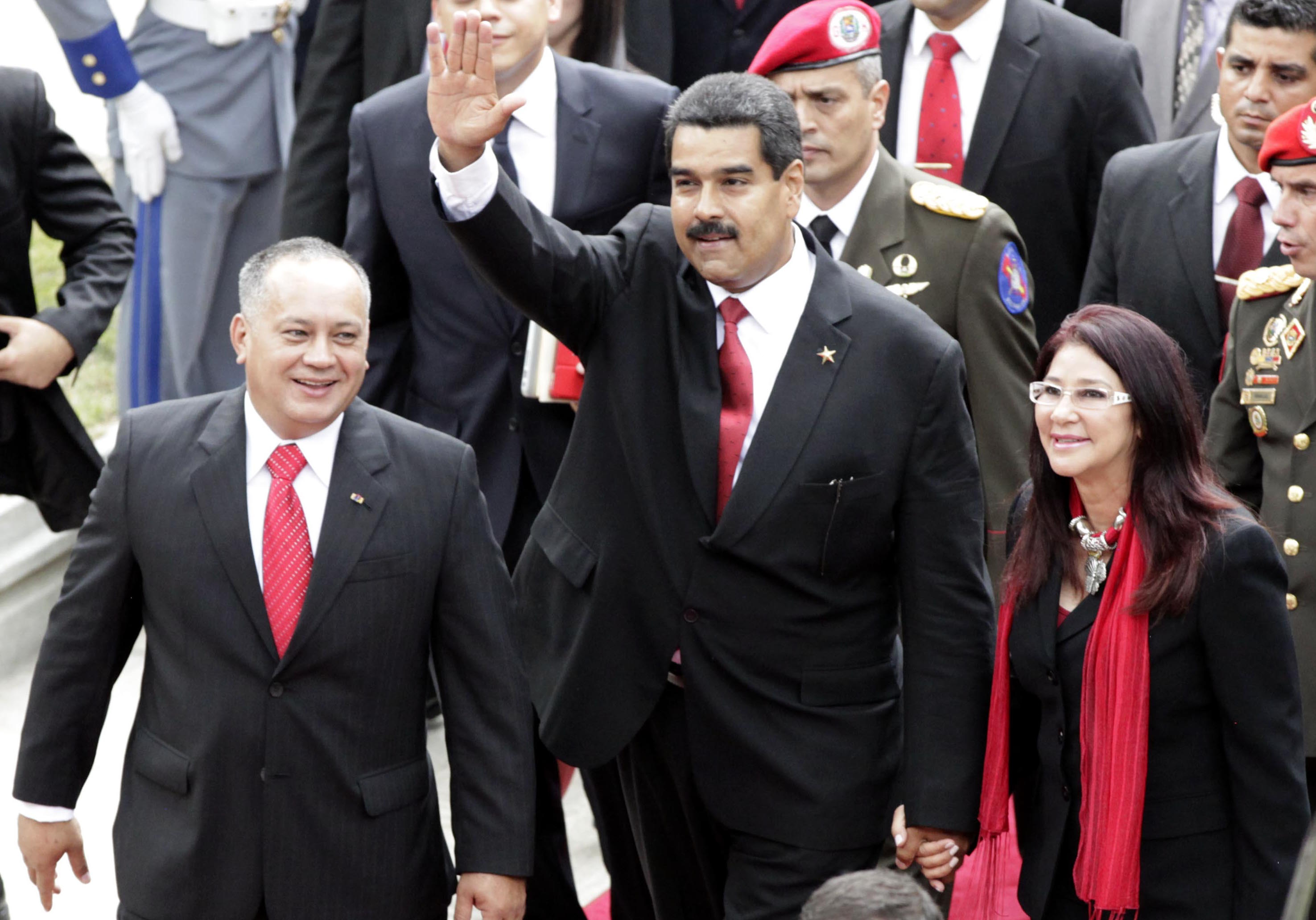
Diosdado Cabello beside Nicolás Maduro and his wife, Cilia Flores

Following Chávez's death in 2013, Nicolás Maduro became president after defeating his opponent Henrique Capriles by 235,000 votes, a 1.5% margin. Maduro continued most of the existing economic policies of Chávez. Upon entering the presidency, his administration faced a high inflation rate and large shortages of goods, problems left over from Chávez's policies.

Maduro said capitalist speculation had driven high rates of inflation and created widespread shortages of basic necessities. In September 2013, the government seized a toilet paper factory, saying that its owners had been hoarding goods in hopes of selling them later at a higher price. In November, the government seized an electronics store over allegations of price gouging, and imposed price controls on another. The imposition of price controls on certain industries led to a surge in demand for those goods. Though the price controls made goods more affordable for those who could obtain them, they could not meet overall demand. Maduro announced a three phase plan to alleviate the country's economic troubles. The goals of his "economic offensive" were to activate domestic production, break with "oil rentism", guarantee supply and fix prices at affordable levels. In 2014, The National Assembly granted him greater powers to impose price controls and seize businesses he accused of price gouging scarce goods.

By 2014, Venezuela had entered an economic recession. The economy contracted by 4.8%, 4.9% and 2.3% in the first three quarters of the year. 12-month inflation reached 63.6%. Oil exports fell by 14.2%. Despite poor GDP growth, some social indicators continued to improve. Extreme poverty was reduced to 5.4% and unemployment fell to 5.9%. The crisis intensified as a result of oil oversupply in early 2015, and a drop in Venezuela's oil production from lack of maintenance and investment. Between 2014 and 2016, real GDP declined by an estimated 24.3%. By 2016, the country had an inflation rate of 800%, the highest in its history.

In January 2016, the National Assembly declared a "health humanitarian crisis" given the "serious shortage of medicines, medical supplies and deterioration of humanitarian infrastructure", asking Maduro's government to "guarantee immediate access to the list of essential medicines that are basic and indispensable and that must be accessible at all times." In August, Secretary-General of the United Nations Ban Ki-moon declared that there was a humanitarian crisis in Venezuela caused by the lack of basic needs, including food, water, sanitation and clothing.

Extrajudicial killings by the Venezuelan government became common, with the United Nations (UN) reporting 5,287 killings by the Special Action Forces (FAES) in 2017, with at least another 1,569 killings recorded in the first six months of 2019. On the grounds that many of these killings constituted extrajudicial executions, the Venezuelan authorities responded with security operations aimed at "neutralizing, repressing and criminalizing political opponents and people critical of the government". The UN stated that the Special Action Forces "would plant arms and drugs and fire their weapons against the walls or in the air to suggest a confrontation and to show the victim had resisted authority" and that some of the killings were "done as a reprisal for [the victims'] participation in anti-government demonstrations."

The government failed to cut spending in the face of falling oil revenues, and has dealt with the crisis by denying its existence and violently repressing opposition.

Before the 2019 presidential crisis, the Maduro government denied several offers of aid, stating that there was not a humanitarian crisis and that such claims were used to justify foreign intervention. Maduro's refusal of aid worsened the effects of Venezuela's crisis.

In March 2019, The Wall Street Journal said that "Mr. Maduro has long used food and other government handouts to pressure impoverished Venezuelans to attend pro-government rallies and to support him during elections as the country's economic meltdown has intensified." In 2019, The Economist wrote that the Maduro government had obtained "extra money from selling gold (both from illegal mines and from its reserves) and narcotics".

==== Elections and protests ====
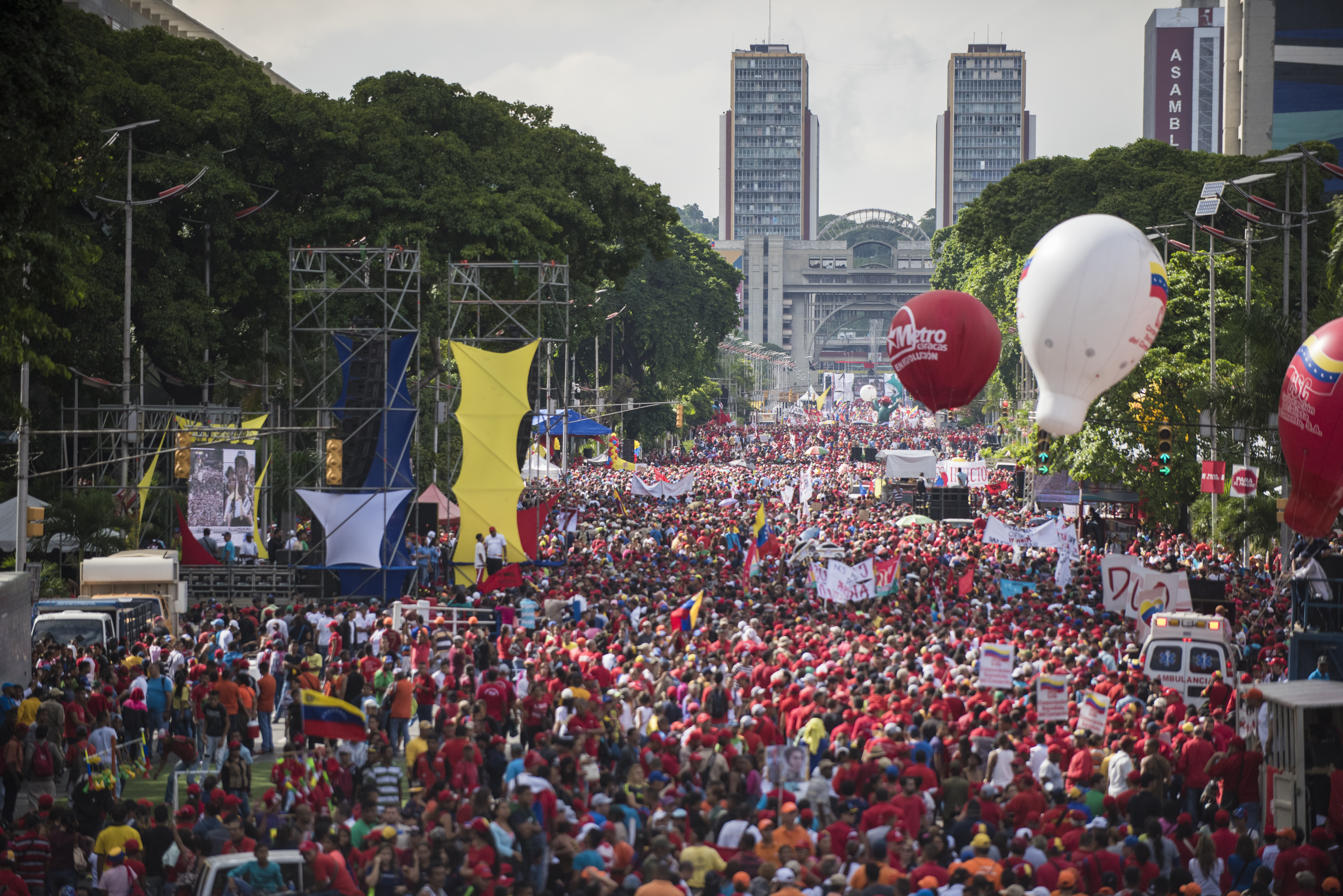
Venezuelans demonstrating during the 2016 Venezuelan protests

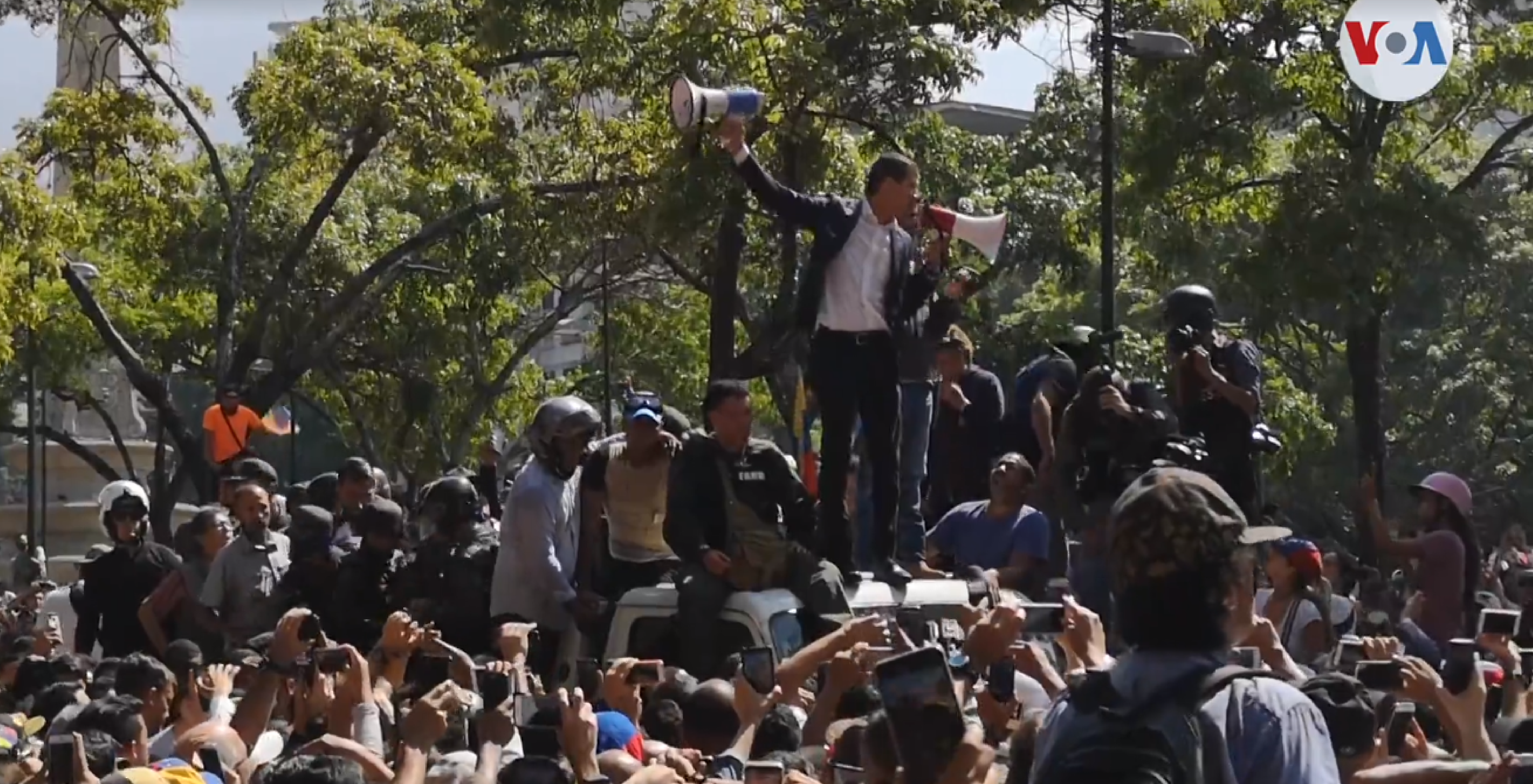
Juan Guaidó during the 2019 Venezuelan uprising

As a result of discontent with the government, in the 2015 parliamentary election the opposition was elected to the majority in the National Assembly, after which the outgoing (lame duck) National Assembly—consisting of Bolivarian officials—filled the Supreme Tribunal of Justice, the highest court in Venezuela, with Maduro allies.

Maduro disavowed the National Assembly in 2017 leading to the 2017 Venezuelan constitutional crisis; as of 2018, some considered the National Assembly the only "legitimate" institution left in the country, (Note: Sources reporting on claims of the National Assembly being the "only democratically elected" or "only legitimate" political body in Venezuela include: Financial Times, the BBC, Economic Times, CTV, Reuters agency, CBC, etc.) and human rights organizations said there were no independent institutional checks on presidential power. (Note: On unchecked power of the executive: Human Rights Watch 2018 report, Human Rights Watch 2017 report, Amnesty International, and Amnesty International on opposition.) Protests grew to their most "combative" since they began in 2014. On 1 May 2017, Maduro called for a constituent assembly that would draft a new constitution to replace the 1999 Venezuela Constitution. The members of the Constituent Assembly would not be elected in open elections, but selected from social organizations loyal to Maduro. It would also allow him to stay in power during the interregnum and skip the 2018 presidential elections.

Many countries considered these actions a bid by Maduro to stay in power indefinitely, and over 40 countries, along with NGOs, stated that they would not recognize the 2017 Constituent National Assembly (ANC). The Democratic Unity Roundtable—the opposition to the incumbent ruling party—boycotted the election, and the incumbent Great Patriotic Pole, dominated by the United Socialist Party of Venezuela, won almost all seats in the assembly by default.

The ANC was sworn in on 4 August 2017, and the next day declared itself to be the government branch with supreme power in Venezuela, banning the opposition-led National Assembly from performing actions that would interfere with the assembly.

In February 2018 Maduro called presidential elections, four months before the prescribed date. There were many irregularities, including the banning from standing of several major opposition parties. Maduro was declared the winner in May 2018. Many said the elections were invalid. Politicians both internally and internationally said Maduro was not legitimately elected, and considered him an ineffective dictator. In the months leading up to his 10 January 2019 inauguration, Maduro was facing pressure to step down by nations and bodies including the Lima Group (excluding Mexico), the United States, and the OAS; this pressure was increased after the new National Assembly of Venezuela was sworn in on 5 January 2019.

The 2019 presidential crisis came to a head when the National Assembly stated that the results of the May 2018 presidential election were invalid and declared National Assembly president Juan Guaidó to be the acting president, citing several clauses of the 1999 Venezuelan Constitution.

==== 2024 Venezuelan political crisis ====
The 2024 Venezuelan political crisis is the crisis that continued after the 2024 Venezuelan presidential election results were announced. Maduro ran for a third consecutive term, while former diplomat Edmundo González Urrutia represented the Unitary Platform (Spanish: Plataforma Unitaria Democrática; PUD), the main opposition political alliance, after the Venezuelan government barred leading candidate María Corina Machado from participating.

Academics, news outlets and the opposition provided "strong evidence" according to The Guardian to suggest that González won the election by a wide margin. The government-controlled National Electoral Council (CNE) announced results claiming a narrow Maduro victory on 29 July. A 6 August article in The New York Times stated that the CNE declaration that Maduro won "plunged Venezuela into a political crisis that has claimed at least 22 lives in violent demonstrations, led to the jailing of more than 2,000 people and provoked global denunciation." In the aftermath of the government's announcement of falsified results, protests broke out across the country, as the Maduro administration initiated Operation Tun Tun, a crackdown on dissent, and detained opposition political figures while refusing to relinquish power. Criminalization of protest was widely condemned by human rights organizations. Maduro did not acknowledge the results which showed him losing the election, and instead asked the Supreme Tribunal of Justice (TSJ) on 1 August to audit and approve the results. On 22 August, as anticipated, the TSJ described the CNE's statement of Maduro winning the election as "validated".

== Basic needs ==
=== Poverty ===
The Wall Street Journal reported in March 2019 that poverty was double that of 2014. A study from Andrés Bello Catholic University indicated that by 2019 at least 8 million Venezuelans did not have enough to eat. A UN report estimated in March 2019 that 94% of Venezuelans live in poverty, and that one quarter of Venezuelans need some form of humanitarian assistance.

According to the Living Conditions Survey by the Andrés Bello Catholic University (Encovi in Spanish, Encuesta de Condiciones de Vida), by 2021 94.5% of the population was in poverty based on income, out of which 76.6% lived under extreme poverty, the highest figure ever recorded in the country.

=== Food and water ===
More than 70% of Venezuela's food is imported; Venezuela became overly dependent on food imports which the country could no longer afford when the price of oil dropped in 2014. Chávez gave the military control of food, and nationalized much of the industry, which was then neglected, leading to production shortages. With a "diminished food supply", Maduro put "generals in charge of everything from butter to rice". With the military in charge of food, food trafficking became profitable, bribes and corruption common, and food did not reach the needy. The government imports most of the food the country needs, it is controlled by the military, and the price paid for food is higher than justified by market prices. Venezuelans were spending "all day waiting in lines" to buy rationed food, "pediatric wards filled up with underweight children, and formerly middle-class adults began picking through rubbish bins for scraps".

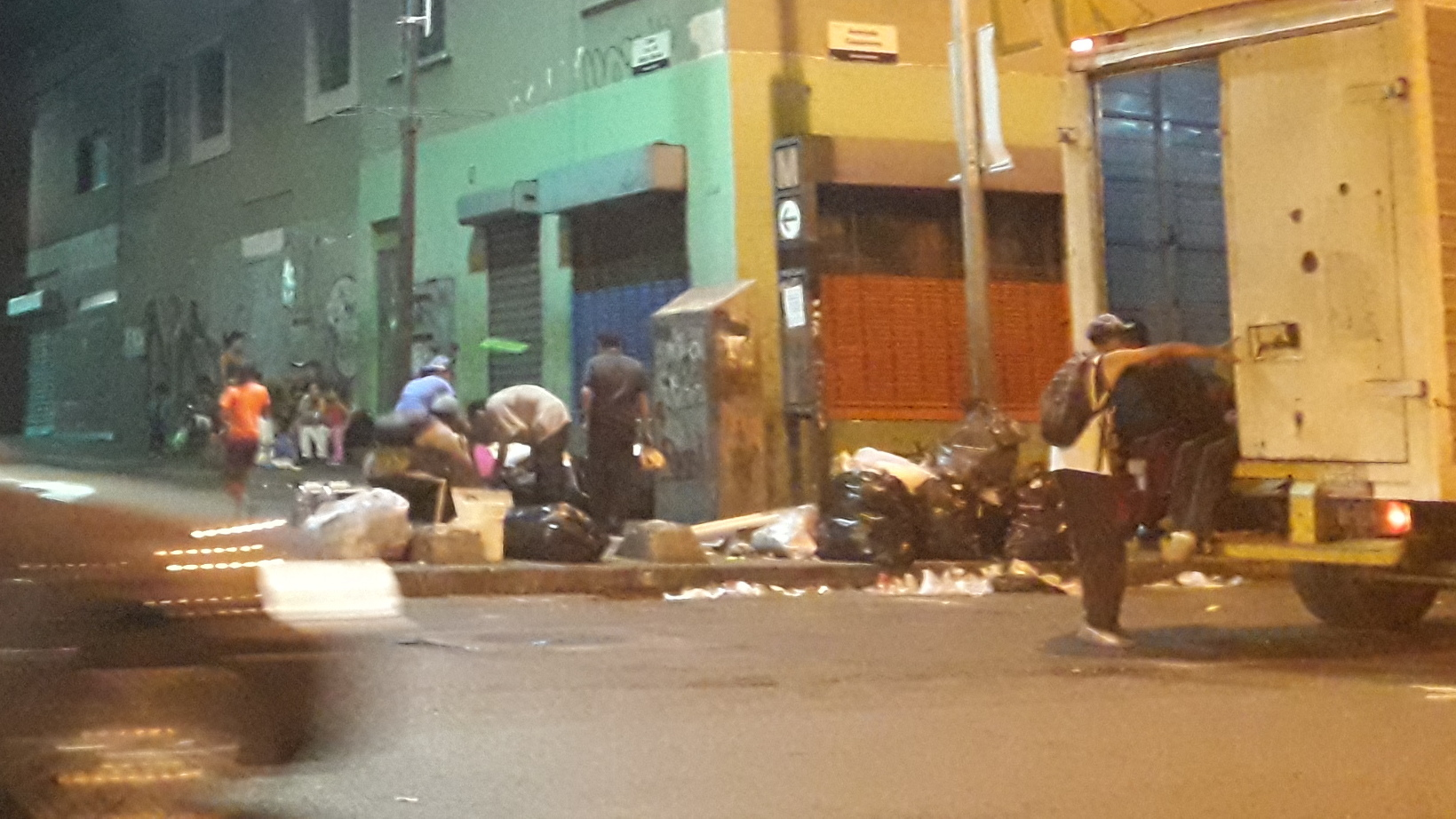
A group of Venezuelans eating garbage on the streets of Caracas in May 2018

Several other factors have led to shortages: imports over the two years until the end of 2017 declined by two-thirds; hyperinflation has made food too costly for many Venezuelans; and for those who depend on food boxes supplied by the government, "these do not reach all Venezuelans who need them, provision of boxes is intermittent, and receipt is often linked to political support of the government".

Corruption became a problem in the distribution of food. The operations director at one food import business says "he pays off a long roster of military officials for each shipment of food he brings in from ... the US. It's an unbroken chain of bribery from when your ship comes in until the food is driven out in trucks." A National Guard lieutenant denies this charge, saying corruption would be worse if the military were not involved; government and military officials say the opposition is overstating the corruption problem for their own benefit. Retired General Antonio Rivero said that "Maduro is trying to prevent soldiers from going hungry and being tempted to participate in an uprising against an increasingly unpopular government", adding that using the military to control food distribution has "drained the feeling of rebellion from the armed forces" by giving soldiers access to food denied others, with the resulting corruption increasing shortages for the general public.

The colectivos are also involved in food trafficking, selling food on the black market; a colectivo leader told InSight Crime that trafficking food and medicine is as profitable as drug-running, but carries less risk. With shadowy connections to the government, The Washington Post says "some have been put in charge of the distribution of government food packages in poor areas—giving them control over hungry neighborhoods."

The Associated Press reports that people gather every evening in downtown Caracas in search of food thrown out on a sidewalk; the people are typically unemployed, but are "frequently joined by small business owners, college students and pensioners—people who consider themselves middle class even though their living standards have long ago been pulverized by triple-digit inflation, food shortages and a collapsing currency". A waste collection official in Maracaibo reported that most of the trash bags he received had been gone through by people searching for food. One dump reports finding parts of dismembered animals, like "dogs, cats, donkeys, horses and pigeons" and there is evidence that people are eating wildlife such as anteaters, flamingos, vultures and lizards.

"Hunger, malnutrition, and severe food shortages are widespread in all Venezuela", according to Human Rights Watch. Doctors at 21 public hospitals in 17 Venezuelan states told The New York Times in 2017 that "their emergency rooms were being overwhelmed by children with severe malnutrition—a condition they had rarely encountered before the economic crisis began", and that "hundreds have died". The government has responded with "a near-total blackout of health statistics, and by creating a culture in which doctors are often afraid to register cases and deaths that may be associated with the government's failures".

The Food and Agriculture Organization of the UN said that less than 5% of Venezuelans were undernourished between 2008 and 2013, but that number had more than doubled, to almost 12% from 2015 and 2017, representing 3.7 million people. A 2016 survey found that almost three-quarters of the population said that, because of improper nutrition, they had lost on average 8.7 kg (19.4 lbs) and 64% said they lost 11 kg (24 lbs) in 2017. A 2016 Venebarometro poll of 1,200 Venezuelans found almost half are no longer able to eat three daily meals; the government blames this on an "economic war" they say is waged by the opposition.

A UN report said that because of lack of water and sanitation, 4.3 million Venezuelans needed assistance in 2019.

During the 2019 Venezuelan blackouts which started on 7 March, the water distribution system also had shortages. Analysts said that two-thirds of Venezuela's population (20 million people) were without water, partially or completely, in the weeks after the blackouts. The head of the infectious disease department at the University Hospital of Caracas, María Eugenia Landaeta said that, without access to clean water, the chance of people contracting bacterial infections increased, and that doctors had seen during the blackouts "surges in diarrhea, typhoid fever and hepatitis A", while non-sterile water and lack of hygiene was contributing to postpartum infections.

By 2017, hunger had escalated to the point where almost seventy-five percent of the population had lost an average of over 8 kg (over 19 lbs) in weight (Note: Venezuela's Living Conditions Survey (ENCOVI) found nearly 75% of the population had lost an average of at least 8.7 kg (19.4 lb) in weight due to a lack of proper nutrition.) and more than half did not have enough income to meet their basic food needs. An UN report estimated in March 2019 that 94% of Venezuelans lived in poverty, and by 2021 almost twenty percent of Venezuelans (5.4 million) had left their country. The UN analysis estimates in 2019 that 25% of Venezuelans need some form of humanitarian assistance. Venezuela led the world in murder rates, with 81.4 per 100,000 people killed in 2018, making it the third most violent country in the world. Following increased international sanctions throughout 2019, the Maduro government abandoned policies established by Chávez such as price and currency controls, which resulted in the country seeing a temporary rebound from economic decline before COVID-19 entered Venezuela the following year. As a response to the devaluation of the official bolívar currency, by 2019 the population increasingly started relying on US dollars for transactions. Maduro described dollarization as an "escape valve" that helps the recovery of the country, the spread of productive forces in the country and the economy. However, Maduro said that the Venezuelan bolívar remained as the national currency.

=== Health care ===
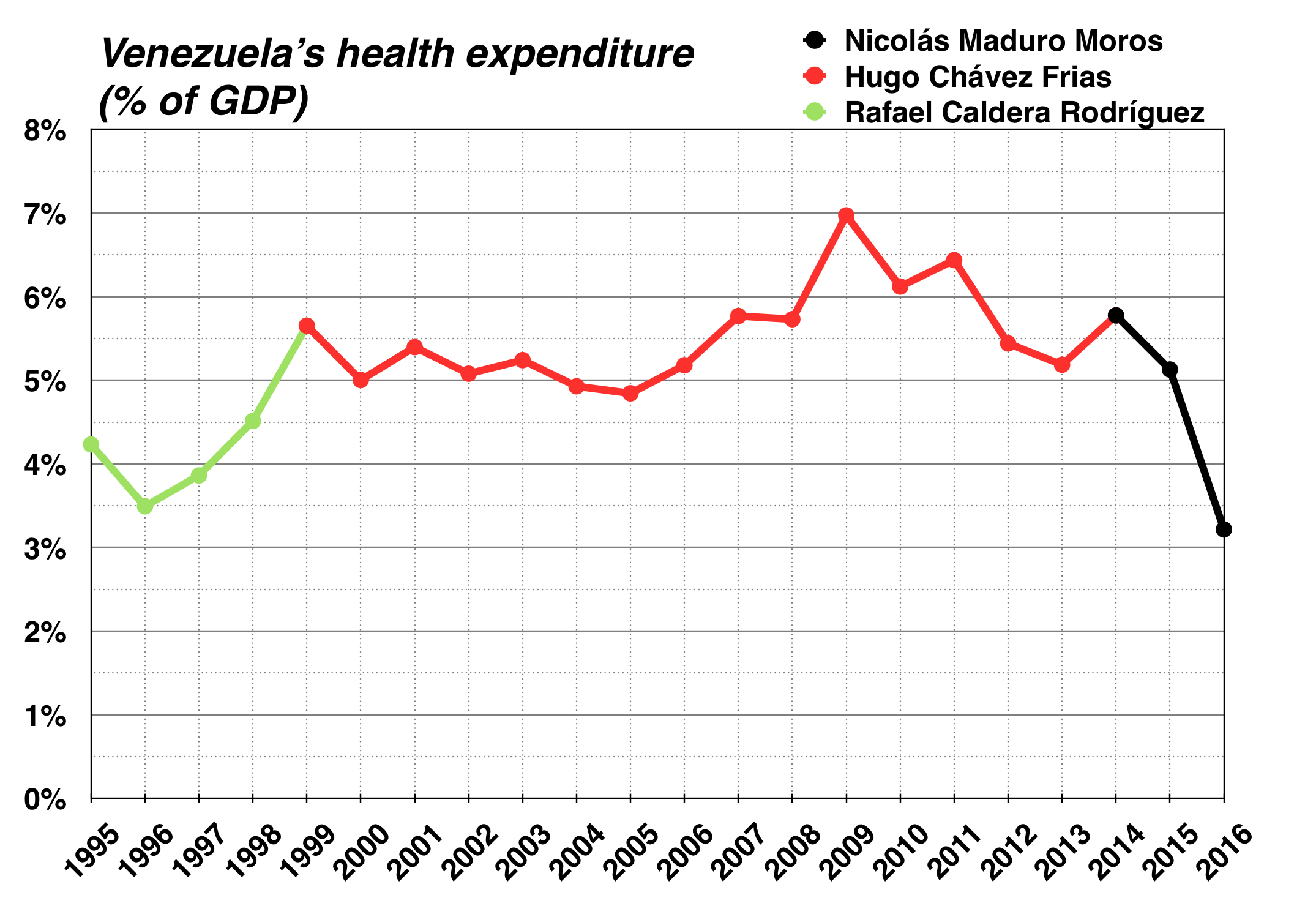
Healthcare spending by percentage of Venezuela's GDP

During the Bolivarian Revolution, the government began providing free healthcare, with Cuban medical professionals providing aid. The government's failure to concentrate on healthcare and a reduction in spending on healthcare, along with unchecked government corruption resulted in avoidable deaths due to severe shortages of medical supplies and equipment, and the emigration of medical professionals to other countries.

Venezuela's reliance on imported goods and the complicated exchange rates initiated under Chávez led to increasing shortages during the late 2000s and into the 2010s that affected the availability of medicines and medical equipment in the country. Associated Press says the government stopped publishing medical statistics in 2010. The Health Minister changed multiple times during Chávez's presidency. According to a high-ranking official of Venezuela's Health Ministry, the ministers were treated as scapegoats whenever issues with public health arose in Venezuela. He also said that officials of the Health Ministry engaged in corruption to enrich themselves by selling goods intended for public healthcare to others.

Early in the Maduro presidency, the government could not supply enough money for medical supplies among healthcare providers, with the president of the Venezuelan Medical Federation saying that 9 of 10 large hospitals had only 7% of required supplies and private doctors reporting numbers of patients that are "impossible" to count "dying from easily treatable illnesses when Venezuela's downward economic slide accelerated after Chávez's death". Many Venezuelans died avoidable deaths with medical professionals having scarce resources and using methods that were replaced decades ago. In February 2014, doctors at the University of Caracas Medical Hospital stopped performing surgeries due to the lack of supplies, even though nearly 3,000 people required surgery.

By early 2015, only 35% of hospital beds were available and 50% of operating rooms could not function due to the lack of resources. In March 2015, a Venezuelan NGO, Red de Medicos por la Salud, reported that there was a 68% shortage of surgical supplies and a 70% shortage of medicines in Venezuelan pharmacies. In 2018, the Pan American Health Organization (PAHO) reported that approximately one-third (22,000 of 66,138) of registered physicians left Venezuela as of 2014. Rosemary DiCarlo from the UN said that 40% of medical professionals had left Venezuela and supplies of medicine were at 20% of levels needed. The Venezuelan Medical Federation said that doctors were leaving the public health care system because of shortages of drugs and equipment and poor pay. In August 2015 Human Rights Watch said "We have rarely seen access to essential medicines deteriorate as quickly as it has in Venezuela except in war zones." In 2015, the government reported that a third of patients admitted to public hospitals died. The medications of individuals who die are re-distributed through small-scale and local efforts, with the help of the families of the deceased, to try to supply surviving patients.

One study of 6,500 households by three of the main universities in Venezuela found that "74% of the population had lost on average nineteen pounds in 2016". In April 2017 Venezuela's health ministry reported that maternal mortality jumped by 65% in 2016 and that the number of infant deaths rose by 30%. It also said that the number of cases of malaria was up by 76%. Shortly after Minister of Health Antonieta Caporale released in 2017 this data, and health statistics showing increases in 2016 infant and maternal mortality and infectious diseases, Maduro fired her and replaced the physician with a pharmacist close to vice-president Tareck El Aissami, Luis López Chejade. The publications were removed from the Ministry's website, and no further health data has been made available, although the government had produced health bulletins for several decades.

In March 2019, The Wall Street Journal reported that the "collapse of Venezuela's health system, once one of the best in Latin America, has led to a surge in infant and maternal mortality rates and a return of rare diseases that were considered all but eradicated. Health officials say malaria, yellow fever, diphtheria, dengue and tuberculosis are now spreading from Venezuela to neighboring countries as Venezuelan refugees surge over borders." The United Nations estimated in 2019 that 2.8 million Venezuelans have healthcare needs, 300,000 are at risk of dying with cancer, diabetes or HIV as they have not had access to medicine for more than a year, and preventable diseases like diphtheria, malaria, measles and tuberculosis are rising in 2019, along with hepatitis A, because of sanitation and lack of access to water. The April 2019 HRW/Johns Hopkins report showed this rise in infectious and preventable diseases, as well as increasing malnutrition, infant and maternal death, and undertreatment of HIV. Inflation and medicine shortages have meant that patients are asked to bring their own food, water and soap, and medical supplies including scalpels and syringes. In August 2019, as part of regional efforts to help Venezuelan migrants, the United States promised that it will provide thousands of doses of HIV medication to prevent the spread of HIV/AIDS and to treat those who have it.

==== 2019 Human Rights Watch/Johns Hopkins report ====
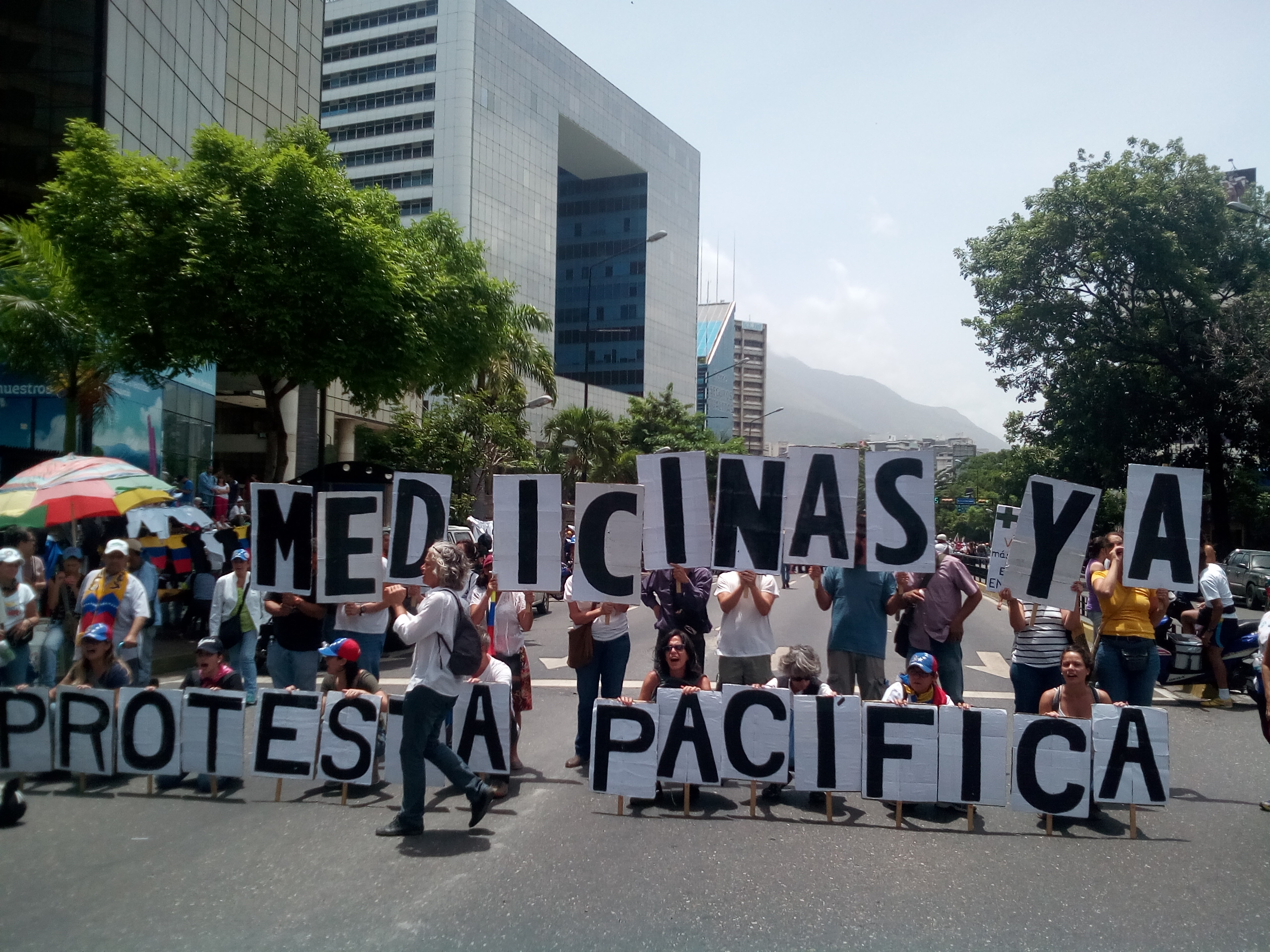
Venezuelans protesting in 2017 for medicine due to the shortages in Venezuela

In April 2019, Human Rights Watch (HRW) and Johns Hopkins Bloomberg School of Public Health published the results of a joint, year-long research project in a report entitled "Venezuela's humanitarian emergency: Large-scale UN response needed to address health and food crises". Combined with data from the World Health Organization (WHO), the PAHO and Venezuelan sources, the report was based on 156 interviews with Venezuelan emigrants to Colombia and Brazil, officials from relief and humanitarian organizations, Venezuelan health care professionals, and UN and government officials from Brazil and Colombia. Most of the interviews occurred in July or August 2018 in visits by the experts to the Venezuelan border towns of Cúcuta, Colombia and Boa Vista or Pacaraima, Brazil.

The Washington Post stated that the HRW/Johns Hopkins report "paints an extremely grim picture of life in Venezuela, whose once-prosperous economy has imploded because of mismanagement and corruption under Maduro"; it documents rising maternal and infant death, spread of preventable diseases, food insecurity, and child malnutrition. HRW declared that the "combination of severe medicine and food shortages ... with the spread of disease ... amounts to a complex humanitarian emergency that requires a full-scale response by the United Nations secretary-general." The Washington Post states that the report describes a healthcare system that is in "utter collapse", with diseases that are preventable via vaccination spreading, and "dramatic surges" in infectious diseases once eradicated in Venezuela.

The economic crisis in Venezuela started around 2010, and the health crisis followed by two years and significantly worsened in 2017, but the situation in 2019 "is even more dismal than researchers expected". Paul Spiegel, MD, who was the editor and reviewer of the report said, "Venezuela is a middle-income country with a previously strong infrastructure, so just to see this incredible decline ... in such a short period of time is quite astonishing." Alberto Paniz-Mondolfi, a doctor in Barquisimeto, Venezuela who is a member of the Venezuelan National Academy of Medicine, told NPR that the report gave an accurate, thorough and timely depiction of the medical situation in his country; he had no affiliation with the report, but said that he had seen cases where there were not even catheters for hooking up children who appeared to have malnutrition for intravenous therapy. Spiegel adds that, because of the infrastructure and trained personnel in Venezuela, aid can be distributed quickly once delivered to Venezuela.

Maduro administration response

Maduro administration on humanitarian crisis

On May 16, 2018, President Maduro said that "everything [that has been said] about measles and diphtheria is a lie, we vaccinate the whole community for free" and that "with regards to food, Venezuela has unique policies, which have enabled us to carry on with a program allowing us to maintain levels of food that are necessary for the people." Days later, the undersecretary of health, Indhriana Parada, gave a speech at WHO highlighting the "achievements" of the Venezuelan health system. She said that "in Venezuela there is no humanitarian crisis" and that "Venezuela guarantees access to basic medicines to the most vulnerable groups through distribution policies." In the case of malaria, she said that government measures had "reduced incidence by 50 percent".

— "Venezuela's humanitarian emergency: Large-scale UN response needed to address health and food crises".

The Maduro administration does not publish health statistics, but rather it "paint[s] a rosy picture of its health care system". The Guardian reported Maduro's response to the country's health care crisis as "inadequate". "Because of the intransigence of President Nicolás Maduro—who has blamed deprivations on US sanctions and refused to allow anything beyond a trickle of assistance to enter the country"—aid has not been delivered quickly enough. Reuters reported that "Maduro says there is no crisis and no need for humanitarian aid, blaming U.S. sanctions for the country's economic problems." Venezuela's foreign minister Jorge Arreaza did not respond to a letter asking for Venezuela's "views regarding the extent of the crisis and the policies it was implementing to address it" before the HRW/Johns Hopkins report was published.

The HRW summary of the HRW/Johns Hopkins report said, "The Venezuelan authorities during the presidency of Nicolás Maduro have proven unable to stem the crisis, and have in fact exacerbated it through their efforts to suppress information about the scale and urgency of the problems." The Associated Press said Maduro "suppress[es] information" and has made the problem worse. The Americas director for HRW, José Miguel Vivanco said, "Venezuelan authorities publicly minimise and suppress information about the crisis, and harass and retaliate against those who collect data or speak out about it, while also doing far too little to alleviate it." The report discusses a teaching physician who said "residents are threatened with being expelled from the program or their hospital if they include a malnutrition diagnosis in medical records", causing malnutrition to be understated in Venezuelan data.

The report states that "many analysts have argued that the government's own policies have played a role in causing the economic crisis ... However, under the presidency of Nicolás Maduro, the Venezuelan government has denied the crisis, hidden health statistics and data, harassed health professionals who speak out about the reality on the ground, and made it harder for sufficient humanitarian assistance to reach the Venezuelan people. Through these policies and practices, authorities have contributed to the worsening humanitarian crisis documented in this report." The International Covenant on Economic, Social and Cultural Rights (ICESCR) is a multilateral treaty ratified by Venezuela; it commits its parties to "the enjoyment of the highest attainable standard of physical and mental health", and the right to an adequate "standard of living" and "adequate food". The Constitution of Venezuela provides for the right to health. (Note: Article 83: Health is a fundamental social right and the responsibility of the State, which shall guarantee it as part of the right to life. The State shall promote and develop policies oriented toward improving the quality of life, common welfare and access to services. All persons have the right to protection of health, as well as the duty to participate actively in the furtherance and protection of the same, and to comply with such health and hygiene measures as may be established by law, and in accordance with international conventions and treaties signed and ratified by the Republic.) The HRW/Johns Hopkins report states that, facing deteriorating health conditions, the government's suppression of information and actions against those speaking about the crisis "represent a violation of Venezuela's obligations to respect, protect, and fulfill the right to health" to which Venezuelans are entitled from both the ICESCR treaty and their Constitution.

Following the April HRW/Johns Hopkins report, and amid announcements from the United Nations about the scale of the humanitarian crisis, along with increasing international pressure, Maduro met with the Red Cross, and it announced it would triple its budget for aid to Venezuela. The increased aid would focus in four areas: the migration crisis, the health care system collapse, water and sanitation, and prisons and detention centers. Maduro, for the first time, indicated he was prepared to accept international aid—although denying a humanitarian crisis exists. The Wall Street Journal said that the acceptance of humanitarian shipments by Maduro was his first acknowledgement that Venezuela is "suffering from an economic collapse", and The Guardian reported that Maduro's stance has softened in the face of increasing pressure. Guaidó said the acceptance of humanitarian aid was the "result of our pressure and insistence", and called on Venezuelans to "stay vigilant to make sure incoming aid is not diverted for 'corrupt' purposes".

==== Infectious and preventable diseases ====
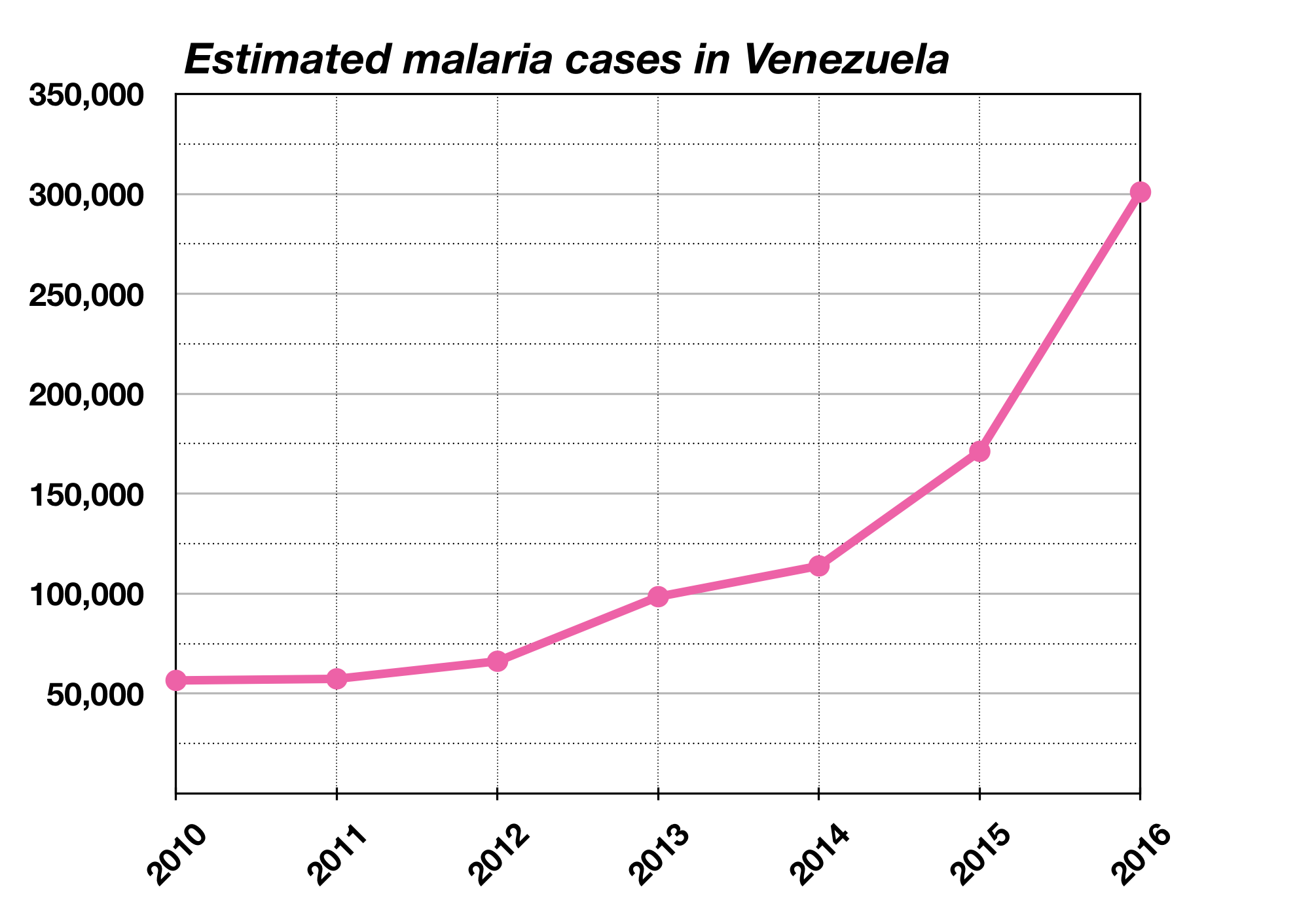
From less than 36,000 cases in 2009, to 414,000 cases of malaria in Venezuela in 2017

In 1961, Venezuela was the first country declared free of malaria. In 2009, the WHO reported there were less than 36,000 cases of malaria in Venezuela. In 2013, Venezuela registered a new high in the number of cases of malaria in the past 50 years, and by 2014, was the only country in Latin America where the incidence of malaria was increasing, allegedly in part due to illegal mining; (Note: Illegal mining creates pools of standing water that encourage mosquito breeding, a partial cause of the increase in malaria seen in Venezuela.) and medical shortages in the country which hampered treatment. By 2016, Venezuela's malaria-prevention program had collapsed, and there were more than a hundred thousand cases of malaria yearly. In 2017, there were 414,000 confirmed cases of malaria, according to the WHO.

Other preventable diseases that "were rare or nonexistent before the economic crisis, have surged", including diphtheria, measles, and tuberculosis. "Venezuela did not experience a single case of diphtheria between 2006 and 2015"; according to the HRW/Johns Hopkins report, since mid-2016, 1,500 of the 2,500 suspected cases have been confirmed. Between 2008 and 2015, there was one recorded case of measles, in 2012; since June 2017, 6,200 of the 9,300 reported cases have been confirmed. The highest rate of tuberculosis in four decades was reached in 2017. In 2014, there were 6,000 reported cases of tuberculosis; preliminary data shows more than 13,000 for 2017.

In 2014, shortages of antiretroviral medicines to treat HIV/AIDS affected about 50,000 Venezuelans, potentially causing thousands of Venezuelans with HIV to develop AIDS. In 2018, PAHO estimated that 90% of Venezuelans who had HIV and were registered by the government—69,308 of the 79,467 registered—were not receiving antiretroviral treatment. The PAHO report estimated that in six years, new HIV cases grew by 24% through 2016, after which the government stopped providing data. NPR reported: "New HIV infections and AIDS-related deaths have increased sharply, in large part because the vast majority of HIV-positive Venezuelans no longer have access to antiretroviral medications." Because of a shortage of HIV test kits, there may be more people who have HIV but are not aware. The HRW/Johns Hopkins report says: "Venezuela is the only country in the world where large numbers of individuals living with HIV have been forced to discontinue their treatment as a result of the lack of availability of antiretroviral (ARV) medicines."

In late 2014, Venezuelans began saying that due to shortages of medicines, it was hard to find acetaminophen to help alleviate symptoms of the newly introduced chikungunya virus, a potentially lethal mosquito-borne disease. In September 2014, the Venezuelan government stated that 400 Venezuelans were infected with chikungunya; the Central University of Venezuela stated that there could be between 65,000 and 117,000 Venezuelans infected. In August 2015 independent health monitors said that there were more than two million people infected with chikungunya while the government said there were 36,000 cases.

===== COVID-19 pandemic =====
As a result of the COVID-19 pandemic, which reached Venezuela in March 2020, costs for services such as internet and telephone lines rose between 80% and 749%, further limiting access to these utilities. Shortages of beds and essential medical equipment, such as latex gloves and antibiotics, have severely limited the capabilities of the country's medical infrastructure.

In April 2020 the Venezuelan government asked the Bank of England to sell $US1.02 billion of the Venezuelan gold reserves held by the bank to help the government fund its response to the COVID-19 pandemic. This was followed on 14 May by a legal claim by the Venezuelan Central Bank (BCV) asking the Bank of England to send the proceeds of the sale of gold to the United Nations Development Programme. The claim stated that the funds would then be used to buy healthcare equipment, medicine, and food to address the country's "COVID-19 emergency". The UK Foreign Office had previously agreed to a request from the Trump administration to block the release of Venezuela's gold. In July 2020, the UK High Court ruled that the gold could not be released to the BCV because the UK government recognised Juan Guaidó as the "constitutional interim president of Venezuela". However, in October 2020, an appeals court overturned the High Court decision and asked the UK Foreign Office to clarify who it recognised as president of Venezuela. The Guardian wrote that the position of the UK government was unclear as it "maintains full consular and diplomatic relations with the Venezuela government". In early 2026 following the Capture of Nicolas Maduro, a report in the Guardian claimed the UK holds at least $1.95bn (£1.4bn).

==== Women, maternal and infant ====
In 2016, infant mortality increased 30% in one year, to 11,466 deaths of children under the age of one. By 2019, the UN reported that infant mortality had "soared". "Venezuela is the only South American country where infant mortality has returned to levels last seen in the 1990s", according to the HRW/Johns Hopkins report. Maternal mortality also increased 65% in one year, to 756 deaths.

Abortion is illegal in Venezuela; the director of a large family planning clinic in Venezuela indicated that more women are arranging for permanent sterilization, and that more are presenting with "complications from clandestine abortions". One of the causes, according to the Venezuelan Association for Alternative Sexual Education, is the severe shortage of oral and injectable contraceptives and intrauterine devices.

The HRW/Johns Hopkins report states that the more than 454,000 Venezuelan women who have emigrated to Colombia face 'threats of sexual exploitation and abuse, trafficking, and sexual and reproductive rights violations"; violence based on gender accounted for more than 12% of 2018 health-care events, and indigenous women may be at higher risk.

Venezuelan women emigrating are at risk for becoming sex trafficking targets virtually anywhere they flee to. Cases of trafficking in Peru, the United States, Spain, and Colombia display the highest numbers.

===== Pregnancy and motherhood =====
Due to lack of medical supplies, food and medical care in Venezuelan hospitals, many pregnant women in Venezuela are crossing the border into neighboring countries to give birth. Lack of basic medicine and equipment is causing preventable deaths and maternity is a very high risk for women, especially since there are no blood banks in the event of excessive bleeding. Hospitals frequently have water and electricity outages and only 7% of emergency services are fully operative. Maternal mortality is estimated to have increased by 65% from 2013 to 2016, and unsafe abortions have contributed to 20% of preventable maternal deaths. According to Amnesty International, causes of the increase in maternal deaths include a lack of medical personnel and supplies like anticoagulants, scar healing cream, painkillers, antibiotics, antiseptics, and other tools and equipment.

===== Statelessness =====
Cúcuta, a city on the Colombian-Venezuela border, has received 14,000 Venezuelan patients at the Erasmo Meoz University Hospital since 2016 and is expecting to receive even more. In this hospital, 75% of the newborns born in the first two months of the year 2019 were Venezuelans. The situation has strained the budget of these hospitals, putting Erasmo Meoz 14 million dollars into debt. While Colombia is the most impacted since it shares a border, women are also traveling to Brazil to give birth. The number of births of Venezuelan babies attended to in Boa Vista, Brazil, has increased from 700 in 2014 to 50,000 in 2017. Venezuelan mothers have also been fleeing to neighboring Peru and Ecuador. For Colombian citizenship it is required that Colombian citizens be born to at least one Colombian parent or be born to foreign parents who meet residence requirements and are eligible to become citizens. Due to the influx of Venezuelan babies being born in Colombia and the Venezuelan government's inability to issue citizenship, Colombia has introduced a new measure that will give these Colombian-born newborns Colombian citizenship to avoid 'statelessness'. The measure went into effect August 2019 and includes babies of Venezuelan parents born in Colombia starting in January 2015, having given citizenship to approximately 27,000 babies born in Colombia over the past four years.

==== Mental health ====
Following the Bolivarian Revolution, the rate of suicide among Venezuelans quadrupled over two decades. As a result of the crisis, stressors resulting in suicide included economic burden, hunger and loneliness due to the emigration of relatives.

In 2015, concerns about shortages and inflation overtook violent crime as Venezuelans' main worry for the first time in years according to pollster Datanálisis. The chief executive of Datanálisis, Luis Vicente Leon, said that Venezuelans had greater concerns over shortages and became preoccupied with the difficulties surrounding them instead. Eldar Shafir, author and American behavioral scientist, said that the psychological "obsession" with finding scarce goods in Venezuela is because the rarity of the item makes it "precious".

In 2016, reporters from The New York Times visited six psychiatric wards across the Venezuela at the invitation of doctors; all reported shortages of medicine and even food. In the investigation, they reported that El Pampero Hospital had not employed a psychiatrist in two years, and that it only had running water for only a few hours a day. The hospital, the article said, also suffered from shortages of basic personal-care and cleaning supplies, such as soap, shampoo, toothpaste or toilet paper. The nurses declared that without sedatives, they had to restrain patients or lock them in isolation cells to keep them from harming themselves. The reporters also noted that the government had denied that its public hospitals were suffering from shortages, and had refused multiple offers of international medical aid.

Despite the threat of violent protests, the economic crisis affected children more than violence. Abel Saraiba, a psychologist with children's rights organization Cecodap said in 2017, "We have children from a very early age who are having to think about how to survive", with half of her young clients requiring treatment because of the crisis. Children are often forced to stand in food lines or beg with their parents, while the games they play with other children revolve around finding food. Friends of the Child Foundation psychologist Ninoska Zambrano said that children are offering sexual services for food. Zambrano said "Families are doing things that not only lead them to break physically, but in general, socially, we are being morally broken".

In 2017, suicide increased by 67% among the elderly and 18% among minors; by 2018, reports emerged of a rapidly increasing suicide rate due to the stressors surrounding the crisis.

==== Medical care and elections ====
Mission Barrio Adentro was a program established by Chávez to bring medical care to poor neighborhoods; it was staffed by Cubans that were sent to Venezuela in exchange for petroleum. The New York Times interviewed sixteen Cuban medical professionals in 2019 who had worked for Barrio Adentro prior to the 2018 Venezuelan presidential elections; all sixteen revealed that they were required to participate in voting fraud. Some of the Cubans said that "command centers" for elections were placed near clinics to facilitate "dispatching doctors to pressure residents". Some tactics reported by the Cubans were unrelated to their profession: they were given counterfeit cards to vote even though they were not eligible voters, they witnessed vote tampering when officials opening ballot boxes and destroyed ballots, and they were told to instruct easily manipulated elderly patients in how to vote.

But they also "described a system of deliberate political manipulation"; their services as medical professionals "were wielded to secure votes for the governing Socialist Party, often through coercion", they told The New York Times. Facing a shortage of supplies and medicine, they were instructed to withhold treatment–even for emergencies–so supplies and treatment could be "doled out closer to the election, part of a national strategy to compel patients to vote for the government". They reported that life-saving treatment was denied to patients who supported the opposition. As the election neared, they were sent door-to-door, on house visits with a political purpose: "to hand out medicine and enlist voters for Venezuela's Socialist Party". Patients were warned that they could lose their medical care if they did not vote for the socialist party, and that, if Maduro lost, ties would be broken with Cuba, and Venezuelans would lose all medical care. Patients with chronic conditions, at risk of death if they couldn't get medicine, were a particular focus of these tactics. One said that government officials were posing as doctors to make these house calls before elections; 'We, the doctors, were asked to give our extra robes to people. The fake doctors were even giving out medicines, without knowing what they were or how to use them," he said.

=== Housing ===
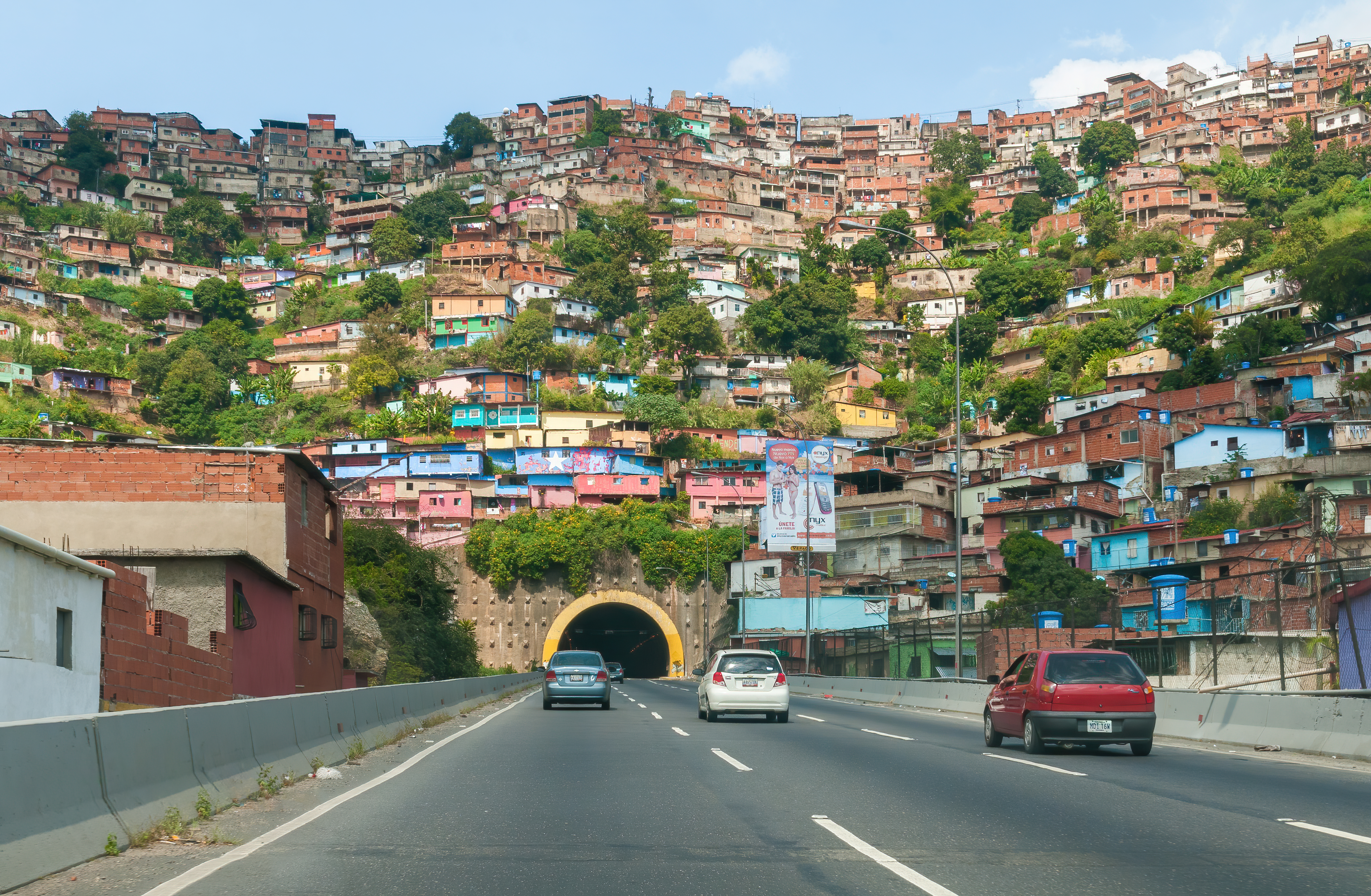
Slums in Caracas seen above El Paraíso tunnel

Since the mid-2000s during Chávez's presidency, Venezuela has had a housing crisis. In 2005, the Venezuelan Construction Chamber (CVC) estimated that there was a shortage of 1.6 million homes, with only 10,000 of 120,000 promised homes constructed by Chávez's government despite billions of dollars in investments. Poor Venezuelans attempted to construct homes on their own despite structural risks.

By 2011, there was a housing shortage of 2 million homes, with nearly twenty prime developments being occupied by squatters following Chávez's call for the poor to occupy "unused land". Up to 2011, only 500,000 homes were constructed during the Chávez administration, with over two-thirds of the new housing developments being built by private companies; his government provided about the same amount of housing as previous administrations. Housing shortages were further exacerbated when private construction halted due to the fear of property expropriations and because of the government's inability to construct and provide housing. Urban theorist and author Mike Davis said in July 2011 to The Guardian, "Despite official rhetoric, the Bolivarianist regime has undertaken no serious redistribution of wealth in the cities and oil revenues pay for too many other programmes and subsidies to leave room for new housing construction." By 2012, a shortage of building materials also disrupted construction, with metal production at a 16-year low. By the end of Chávez's presidency in 2013, the number of Venezuelans in inadequate housing had grown to 3 million.

Under the Maduro government, housing shortages continued to worsen. Maduro announced in 2014 that due to the shortage of steel, abandoned cars and other vehicles would be acquired by the government and melted to provide rebar for housing. In April 2014, Maduro ruled by decree that Venezuelans who owned three or more rental properties would be forced by the government to sell their rental units at a set price or they would face fines or have their property possessed by the government. By 2016, residents of government-provided housing, who were usually supporters of the government, began protesting due to the lack of utilities and food.

== Social ==
=== Corruption ===
Corruption is high in Venezuela according to the Transparency International Corruption Perceptions Index and is prevalent at many levels of society. While corruption is difficult to measure reliably, in 2018 Transparency International ranked Venezuela among the top 13 most corrupt countries out of 180 measured, tied with Iraq, but ahead of Afghanistan, Burundi, Equatorial Guinea, Guinea, North Korea, Libya, Somalia, South Sudan, Sudan, Syria and Yemen. A 2016 poll found that 73% of Venezuelans believed their police were corrupt. Latinobarómetro's 2018 report said that 65% of Venezuelans believed their president was involved in corruption, and 64% believed that government officials were corrupt. Discontent with corruption was cited by opposition-aligned groups as one of the reasons for the 2014 Venezuelan protests. A once wealthy country, Venezuela's economy was driven into political and economic crisis by corruption and mismanagement.

=== Crime ===
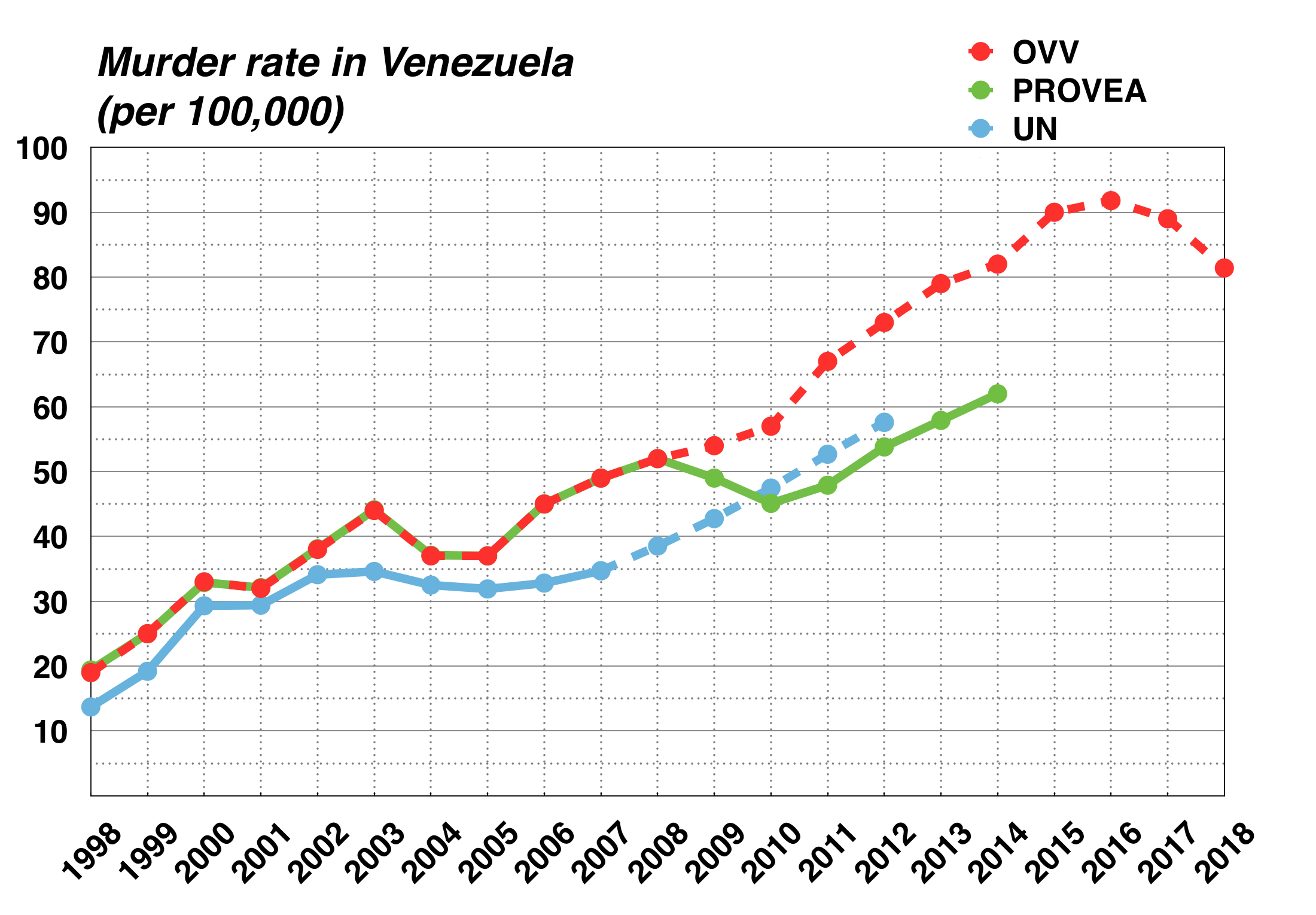
Murder rate (murder per 100,000 citizens) from 1998 to 2018. Sources: OVV, PROVEA, UN; UN data is extrapolated between 2007 and 2012 because of missing data

Escalating violent crime, especially murder, had been called "perhaps the biggest concern" of Venezuelans during the crisis. Venezuela had "by various measures, the world's highest violent-crime rate" in 2017, and almost none of crimes that were reported were prosecuted. InSight Crime says the crisis has "all too often been obscured by the government's reluctance to release damning crime statistics". The New Yorker reporter found that even stairwells in a public hospital were not safe from robbers, who preyed on staff and patients despite the large number of security forces guarding the hospital, saying this was because the police were assigned to contain journalists who might embarrass the government with exposés on the state of the hospital; they were not assigned to protect its occupants. The police allegedly collaborated with the robbers receiving a cut of what they stole.

According to The U.S. Bureau of Diplomatic Security, street gang violence, "corrupt" underpaid police officers, "an inefficient and politicized judicial system", an extremely troubled prison system, and an increased widespread of weaponry has resulted in the majority of criminal activity in Venezuela, with murder being the crime committed the most. The bureau states that there were 73 daily violent deaths in 2018, and that the government "often attempts to refute or repudiate reports of increasing crime and murder rates; however, independent observers widely reject" the Venezuelan government's claims. The government says there were 60 daily homicides in 2016, and 45 daily in 2015, corresponding with Venezuela's downward economic spiral; the OVV says the numbers are higher.

For 2015, the government says the rate of homicides was 70.1 per 100,000 people. The Venezuelan Observatory of Violence (OVV) says the rate was 91.8 homicides per 100,000 people (in 2015, the comparative U.S. number was 4.9 per 100,000 inhabitants). According to the World Bank, the 2016 homicide rate was 56 per 100,000, making Venezuela third in the world, after El Salvador and Honduras. OVV data has 23,047 homicides committed in Venezuela in 2018, a rate of 81.4 per 100,000 people, with the decline being attributed to emigration.

According to the Los Angeles Times,

... carjack gangs set up ambushes, sometimes laying down nail-embedded strips to puncture tires of vehicles ferrying potential quarry. Motorists speak matter-of-factly of spotting body parts along roadways. ... While most crime victims are poor, they also include members of the middle and upper classes and scores of police and military personnel killed each year, sometimes for their weapons. ... "Before the thieves would only rob you," is a common refrain here in the capital. "Now they kill you."

Venezuela led the world in murder rates, with 81 per 100,000 people killed in 2018; the third most violent country.

As a response to the high rate of crime, the Venezuelan government banned private ownership of firearms by some individuals in 2012. El País reported in 2014 that Chávez had years earlier assigned colectivos to be "the armed wing of the Bolivarian Revolution" for the Venezuelan government, giving them weapons, communication systems, motorcycles and surveillance equipment to exercise control in the hills of Caracas where police are forbidden entry. In 2006, they received arms and funding from the state when they were brought under the government's community councils. Chávez eliminated the Metropolitan Police in 2011, turning security over to the colectivos in some Caracas barrios. Some weapons given to the groups include assault rifles, submachine guns and grenades. Despite the Venezuelan government's statements saying that only official authorities can carry weapons for the defense of Venezuela, colectivos are armed with automatic rifles such as AK-47s, submachine guns, fragmentation grenades, and tear gas.

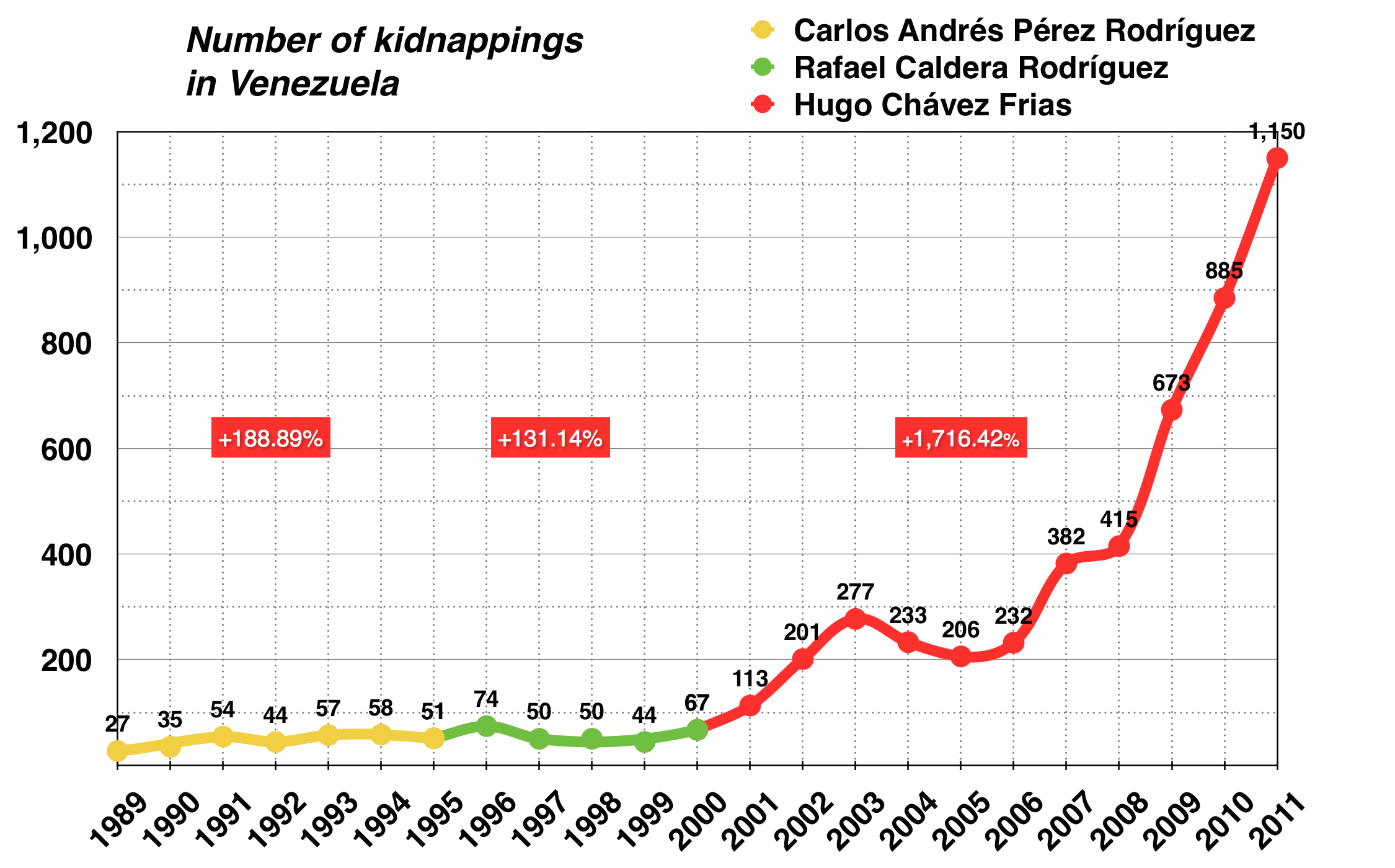
Number of kidnappings in Venezuela 1989–2011. Source: CICPC Note: Express kidnappings may not be included in data.

During the 2014 Venezuelan protests against Maduro, colectivos acted against the opposition protesters. As the crisis intensified, armed gangs have taken control of cities. The Civil Association for Citizen Control said that more than half of those killed during the protests were killed by colectivos. Human Rights Watch described colectivos as "armed gangs who use violence with impunity" to harass political opponents of the Venezuelan government. Amnesty International calls them "armed pro-government supporters who are tolerated or supported by the authorities". During the 2019 Venezuelan blackouts in March, Maduro called on the armed paramilitary gangs, saying, "The time has come for active resistance". As blackouts continued, on 31 March, citizens protested the lack of electricity and water in Caracas and other cities; Maduro called again on the colectivos, asking them "to defend the peace of every barrio, of every block". Videos circulated on social media showing colectivos threatening protesters and shooting in the streets; two protestors were shot.

There is no reliable data on kidnapping in Venezuela and available data is considered an underestimate; it is against the law to pay ransom, and according to criminologists, at least 80% of kidnappings are not reported for fear of retaliation, or because relatives prefer to negotiate, hoping the hostage will be released and fearing they will be killed if authorities are contacted. Available data underestimates the amount of express kidnapping, where victims are typically released in less than two days after relatives pay a quick ransom. Most express kidnapping victims are released, but in 2016, 18 were killed. At least 80% of kidnappings occur in a limited area around Caracas and including Miranda State. In the areas where most kidnappings occur, the government set up so-called "peace zones" where official police withdrew and gangs took over; "experts say the government has armed these groups ... [who] ... control large territories, financed through extortion and the drug trade".

Illegal mining creates pools of standing water that encourage mosquito breeding, a partial cause of the increase in malaria seen in Venezuela.

The murder rate in Venezuela had also decreased significantly between 2017 and 2019. In 2018, Venezuela's murder rate–described as the highest in the world–had begun to decrease to 81.4 per 100,000 people according to the Venezuelan Violence Observatory (OVV), with the organization stating that this downward trend was due to the millions of Venezuelans that emigrated from the country at the time. The murder rate declined even further to 60.3 in 2019.

=== Human rights ===
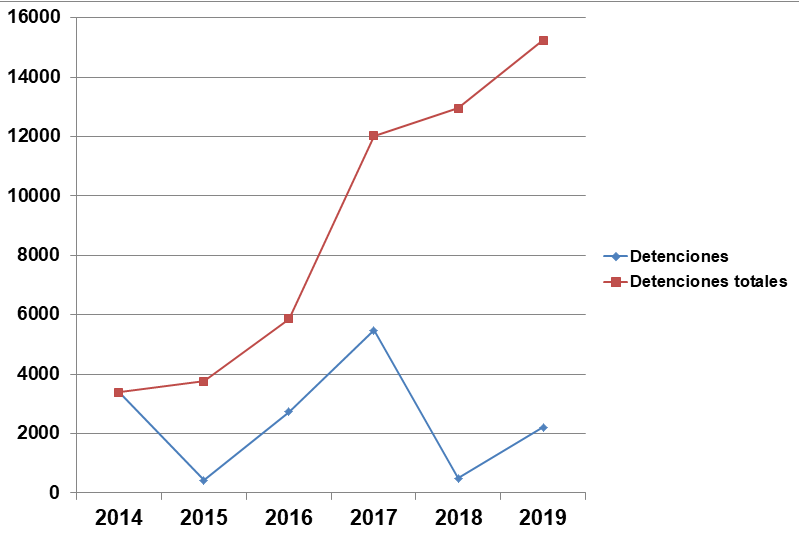
Arbitrary detentions in Venezuela between 2014 and 2019 according to Foro Penal. Arrests by year in blue and total arrests in red.

Repression and politically motivated detentions have risen to record levels in 2019. Foro Penal states that Venezuela has at least 900 political prisoners as of April 2019, with more arrests of people being held longer in poor conditions and on dubious charges. The human rights organization has documented more than 50 instances that include "sexual abuse, strangulation using plastic bags and the use of razor blades to cut detainees' feet". In the first three months of 2019, Foro Penal says 1,712 people were arrested and about two-thirds of those were held for more than 48 hours, the threshold used to classify a detainee as a political prisoner. Maduro calls those arrested members of "terrorist groups" and says his government will not hesitate to send them to prison. Juan Requesens and Roberto Marrero are examples of "purely political" arrests, according to their attorney. Increasingly high numbers of the detainees are working-class people, who have been driven to protest by the crisis.

The final published report addressed the extrajudicial executions, torture, forced disappearances and other human rights violations reportedly committed by Venezuelan security forces in the recent years. Bachelet expressed her concerns for the "shockingly high" number of extrajudicial killings and urged for the dissolution of the FAES. According to the report, 1,569 cases of executions as consequence as a result of "resistance to authority" were registered by the Venezuelan authorities from 1 January to 19 March. Other 52 deaths that occurred during 2019 protests were attributed to colectivos. The report also details how the Venezuelan government "aimed at neutralising, repressing and criminalising political opponents and people critical of the government" since 2016.

On 16 September 2020, the United Nations Fact Finding Mission on Venezuela accused the Maduro government of crimes against humanity.

On 15 February 2024, the Maduro government closed the UN High Commissioner for Human Rights office in Caracas after High Commissioner Volker Türk condemned the detention of activist Rocío San Miguel, demanding "her immediate release and respect for her right to legal defense". Maduro's government expelled its officials, giving them 72 hours to leave the country.

=== Emigration ===
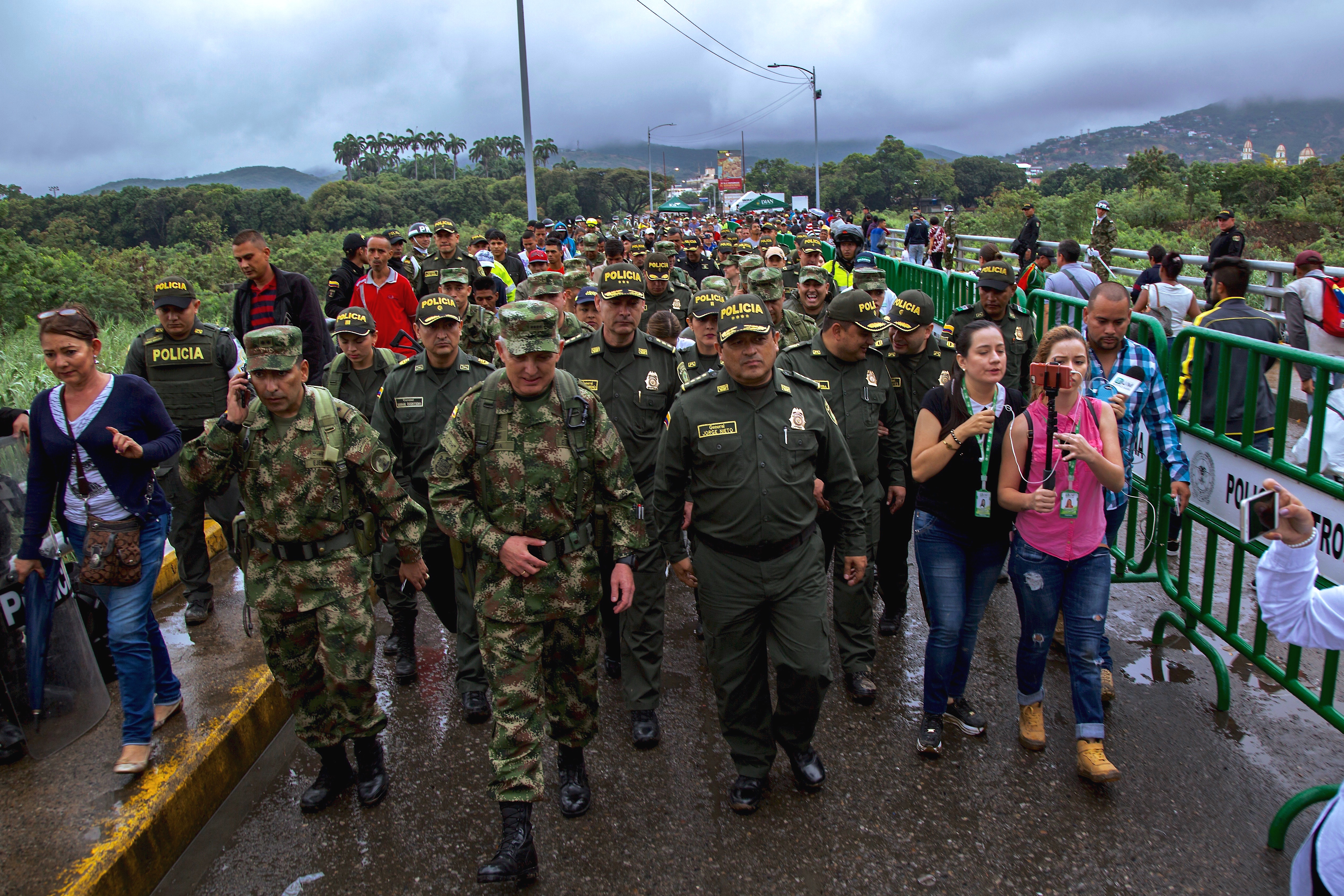
National Police of Colombia accompanying Venezuelans to Cúcuta

The exodus of millions of desperate impoverished Venezuelans to surrounding countries has been called "a risk for the entire region". Millions of Venezuelan people have voluntarily emigrated from Venezuela during the Chávez and Maduro presidencies. The crisis started during the Chávez presidency, but became much more pronounced during Maduro's term. Emigration has been motivated by economic collapse, expansion of state control over the economy, high crime, high inflation, general uncertainty, a lack of hope for a change in government, a failing public sector, and "shortages of basic necessities". The PGA Group estimates more than 1.5 million Venezuelans emigrated in the 15 years between 1999 and 2014; an estimated 1.8 million left in ten years through 2015.

The UN said that in the first part of 2018, about 5,000 Venezuelans were leaving Venezuela daily. A February 2019 UN report estimated that 3.4 million Venezuelans have emigrated, and they expect another 1.9 million may emigrate in 2019. The UN estimates 2.7 million have gone to the Caribbean and Latin America. Most have gone to Colombia; estimates of Venezuelans emigrating to Colombia are 1.1 million, Peru 506,000, Chile 288,000, Ecuador 221,000, Argentina 130,000, and Brazil 96,000. This is in contrast to Venezuela's high immigration rate during the 20th century. Kevin Whitaker, the U.S. ambassador in Colombia, says, "Colombians, in their tens and hundreds of thousands, migrated to Venezuela in the '60s and '70s and '80s, when Venezuela was a wealthy country and Colombia was not so much. Now, more than 1 million Venezuelans, many of them since 2015, have gone to live in Colombia."

Those who leave by foot are known as los caminantes (the walkers); the walk to Bogotá, Colombia is 560 kilometres (350 mi), and some walk hundreds of kilometres further, to Ecuador or Peru. Alba Pereira, who helps feed and clothe about 800 walkers daily in Northern Colombia, said in 2019 she is seeing more sick, elderly and pregnant among the walkers. The Colombian Red Cross has set up rest tents with food and water on the side of the roads for Venezuelans. Venezuelans also cross into northern Brazil, where UNHCR has set up 10 shelters to house thousands of Venezuelans. Images of Venezuelans fleeing the country by sea have raised symbolic comparisons to the images seen from the Cuban diaspora.

In 1998, only 14 Venezuelans were granted U.S. asylum, and by September 1999, 1,086 Venezuelans were granted asylum according to the U.S. Citizenship and Immigration Services. The first wave of Venezuelan emigrants were wealthy and middle class Venezuelans concerned by Chávez's rhetoric of redistributing wealth to the poor; the early exodus of college-educated people with capital caused a brain drain.

Emigration especially increased during the Maduro presidency. This second wave of emigration consisted of lower class Venezuelans suffering directly from the economic crisis facing the country; thus, the same individuals whom Chávez attempted to aid were now seeking to emigrate, driven by worsening economic conditions, scarcity of food and medicine, and rising rates of violent crime. Tomás Pérez, who studies the Venezuelan diaspora at the Central University of Venezuela, said in 2018 that because "now everyone is poor", it is mostly poor leaving the country. Carlos Malamud, from a Spanish think tank, said Maduro is "using migration as a political weapon against the opposition". The scale of the crisis has surpassed in four years the Cuban exodus, in which 1.7 million emigrated over a period of sixty years; Malamud says "Latin American societies aren't prepared for such wide-scale arrivals".

Impacting the health care crisis in Venezuela, health care professionals are emigrating; a primary factor driving emigration to Colombia is the lack of "medicines, supplies, health providers, and basic health services" in Venezuela. Since 2017, the banking sector has seen 18,000 employees leave the country.

==== Migration crisis ====
The Organization of American States (OAS) and spokespersons for the United Nations refugee agency, UNHCR, have described it as the largest exodus in the history of the Western Hemisphere in the last 50 years.

== Economic ==
Maduro's government stopped releasing social and economic indicators, so most data rely on estimates. The Institute of International Finance (IIF) stated in March 2019 that "Venezuela's economic collapse is among the world's worst in recent history". A chief economist of the IIF said the crisis resulted from "policy decisions, economic mismanagement, and political turmoil", saying it is on a scale that "one would only expect from extreme natural disasters or military confrontations". The April 2019 International Monetary Fund (IMF) World Economic Outlook described Venezuela as being in a "wartime economy". For the fifth consecutive year, Bloomberg rated Venezuela last on its misery index in 2019. The government's main source of income is oil, with output "plummeting due to lack of investment, poor maintenance and neglect", from which consultant Eduardo Fortuny expects will take 12 years to recover.

As of 2020 the Venezuelan government has liberalized many socialist or redistributive economic policies—price and currency controls, stringent labor laws—and brought a rapprochement with members of the local business community—especially Lorenzo Mendoza of the iconic Empresas Polar conglomerate (who is no longer denounced as a "thief," a "parasite" and a "traitor"), in exchange for an abandonment of political opposition by Mendoza. However, a "slight recovery" in economic activity in January 2020 reportedly "evaporated in February and March" due to "the fall in global oil prices and the coronavirus pandemic".

=== Business and industry ===
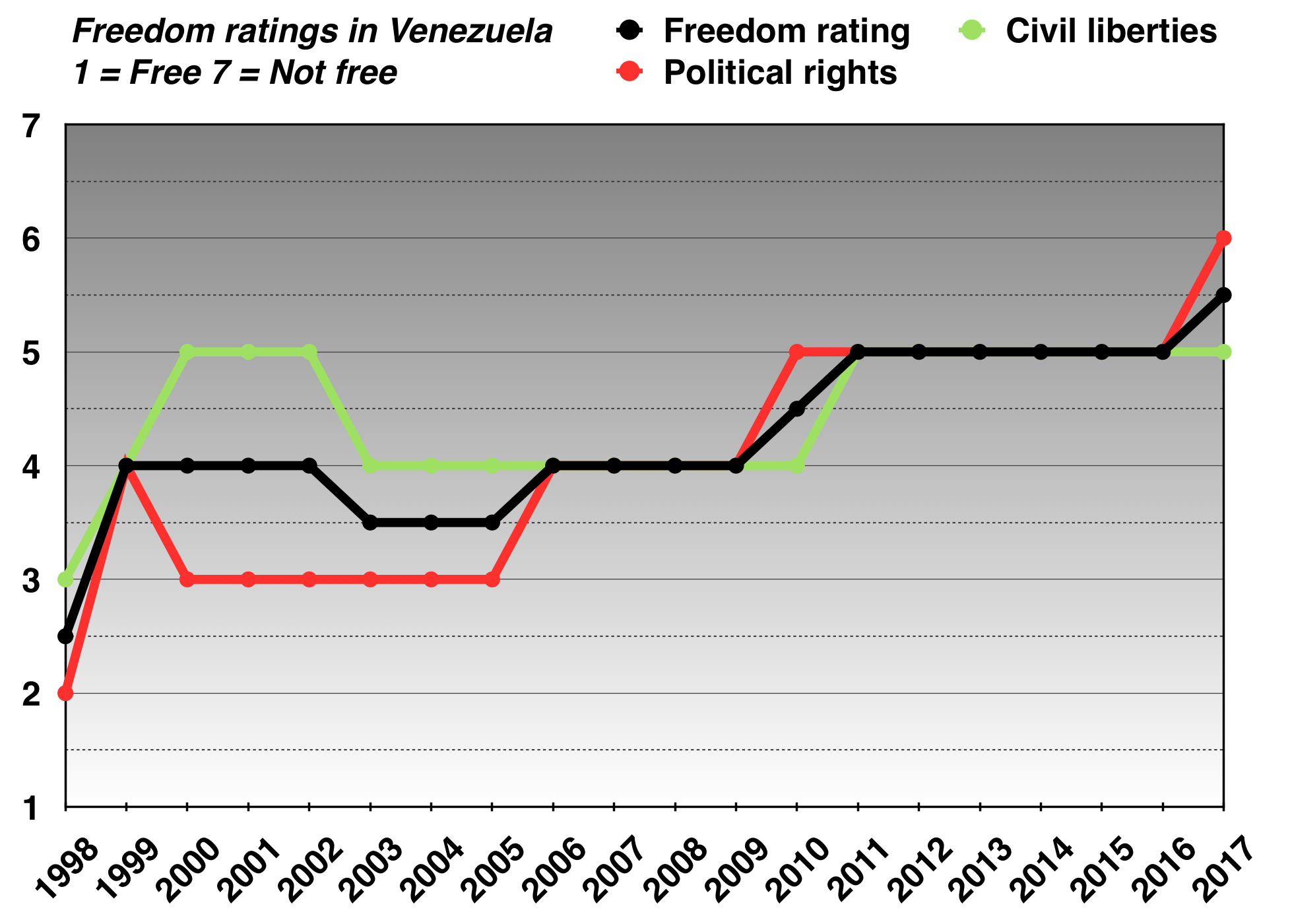
Ratings for Venezuela from 1998 to 2017 by the U.S. Government-funded NGO Freedom House (1 = free, 7 = not free)

A number of foreign firms have left the nation—often due to quarrels with the socialist government—including Smurfit Kappa, Clorox, Kimberly Clark and General Mills; the departures aggravate unemployment and shortages. Before the effects of the 2019 Venezuelan blackouts, the number of multinational companies in the industrial city of Valencia in Carabobo State had dropped from 5,000 when Chávez became president to a tenth of that.

==== Airline industry ====
Domestic airlines are having difficulties because of hyperinflation and parts shortages, and most international airlines have left the country. Airlines from many countries ceased operating in Venezuela, making travel to the country difficult: Air Canada became the first international airline to cease Venezuela operations in March 2014 and was followed by Alitalia in April 2015.

Other airlines that have left are Aeroméxico, Avianca, Delta, Lufthansa, LATAM, and United Airlines. According to the International Air Transport Association (IATA), the government of Venezuela has not paid US$3.8 billion to international airlines in an issue involving conversion of local currency to U.S. dollars. Airlines have left for other reasons, including crime against flight crews and foreign passengers, stolen baggage, and problems with the quality of jet fuel and maintenance of runways. Aerolíneas Argentinas left in 2017, citing security reasons, and American Airlines, the last U.S. airline serving Venezuela, left on 15 March 2019, after its pilots refused to fly to Venezuela, citing safety issues. Currently, the only North American airline flying to Venezuela is Sunwing Airlines, with seasonal service to Margarita Island and Punto Fijo.

Following the increasing economic partnership between Venezuela and Turkey in October 2016, Turkish Airlines started offering direct flights from December 2016 connecting between Caracas to Istanbul (via Havana, Cuba) in an effort to "link and expand contacts" between the two countries.

Iranian airline Mahan Air (blacklisted by the U.S. government since 2011) began direct flights to Caracas in April 2019, "signifying a growing relationship between the two nations" according to Fox News.

In May 2019, the United States Department of Transport and Department of Homeland Security suspended all flights between Venezuela and the United States, due to safety and security concerns. The suspension affects mainly Venezuelan airlines flying to Miami, which are Avior Airlines, LASER Airlines and Estelar Latinoamérica.

=== Gross domestic product ===
Estimated to drop by 25% in 2019, the IMF said the contraction in Venezuela's GDP—the largest since the Libyan Civil War began in 2014—was affecting all of Latin America.

In 2015 the Venezuelan economy contracted 5.7% and in 2016 it contracted 18.6% according to the Venezuelan central bank; after that, the government stopped producing data. Ecoanalítica, a Venezuelan consultant, told The Wall Street Journal that output had halved between 2016 and 2019. The IMF and AGPV Asesores Económicos, a consulting firm based in Caracas, estimate that GDP shrunk to $80 billion in 2018 from $196 billion in 2013, making the economy smaller than Guatemala's or Ethiopia's.

=== Inflation ===
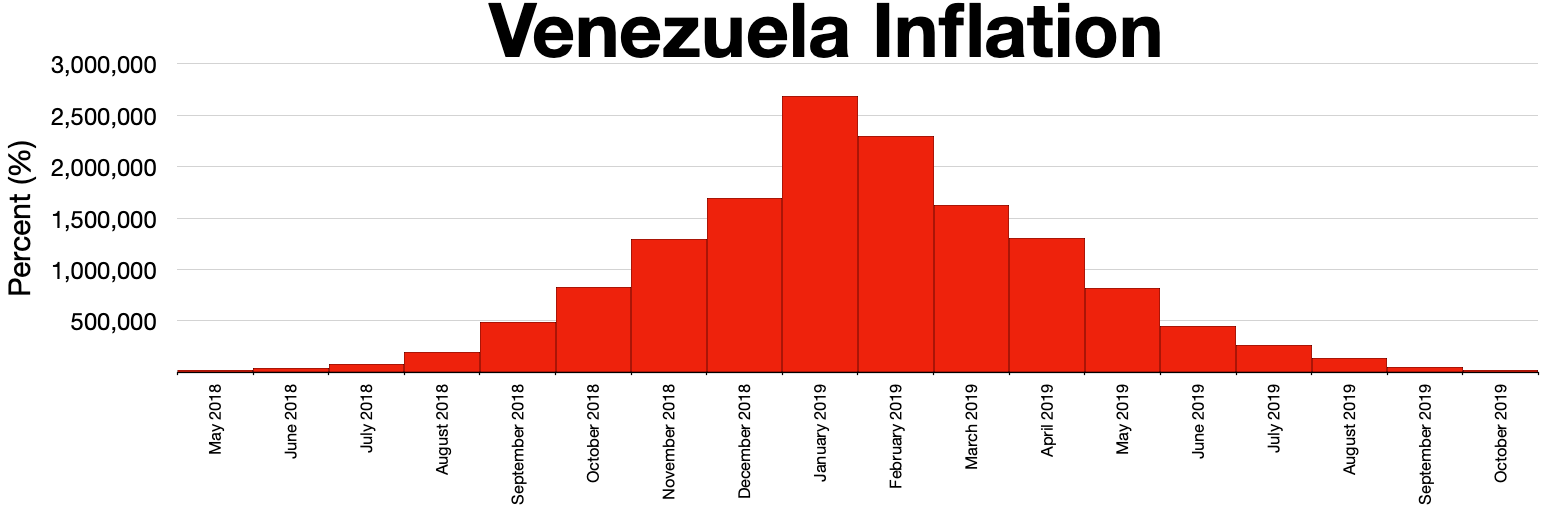
Venezuela hyperinflation (May 2018 – October 2019)

The annual inflation rate for consumer prices has risen hundreds of thousands of percent during the crisis. Inflation in Venezuela remained high during Chávez's presidency. By 2010, inflation removed any advancement of wage increases, and by 2014 at 69% it was the highest in the world. In November 2016, Venezuela entered a period of hyperinflation, with inflation reaching 4,000% in 2017; the Venezuelan government "essentially stopped" producing inflation estimates in early 2018. At the end of 2018, inflation had reached 1.35 million percent.

In the 2017 Christmas season, some shops stopped using price tags since prices would inflate so quickly. From 2017 to 2019, some Venezuelans became video game gold farmers and could be seen playing games such as RuneScape to sell in-game currency or characters for real currency; players could make more money than salaried workers by earning only a few dollars per day. Some of these "gold farmers" will use cryptocurrencies as an intermediary currency before converting into Bolivares, as indicated in this interview.

In October 2018, the IMF estimated that inflation would reach 10,000,000% by the end of 2019.

In early 2019, the monthly minimum salary was the equivalent of US$5.50 (18,000 sovereign bolivars)—less than the price of a Happy Meal at McDonald's. Ecoanalitica estimated that prices jumped by 465% in the first two-and-a-half months of 2019. The Wall Street Journal stated in March 2019 that the "main cause of hyperinflation is the central bank printing money to increase money supply, thus boosting domestic spending.", reporting that a teacher can buy a dozen eggs and two pounds of cheese with a month's wages.

In May 2019, the Central Bank of Venezuela released economic data for the first time since 2015. According to the release, Venezuela's inflation rate was 274% in 2016, 863% in 2017 and 130,060% in 2018. The new reports imply a contraction of more than half of the economy in five years, according to the Financial Times "one of the biggest contractions in Latin American history". Sources quoted by Reuters, said that China may have asked Venezuela to release the data to bring Venezuela into compliance with the IMF and make it more difficult for the IMF to recognise Juan Guaidó during the presidential crisis. The IMF said it was not able to assess the quality of the data as it had no contact with the Venezuelan government.

=== Shortages ===
Shortages in Venezuela became prevalent after price controls were enacted according to the economic policy of the Hugo Chávez government. Under the economic policy of the Nicolás Maduro government, greater shortages occurred due to the Venezuelan government's policy of withholding United States dollars from importers with price controls. Some Venezuelans must search for food—occasionally resorting to eating wild fruit or garbage—wait in lines for hours and sometimes settle without having certain products.

=== Unemployment ===
"Wartime economy"

[Venezuela's wartime economy has the] world's highest unemployment since end of Bosnian War in world's biggest contraction since 2014 start of Libyan Civil War

In January 2016 the unemployment rate was 18.1 percent and the economy was the worst in the world according to the misery index. Venezuela has not reported official unemployment figures since April 2016, when the rate was at 7.3 percent.

Unemployment was forecasted to reach 44% for 2019; the IMF stated that this was the highest unemployment seen since the end of the Bosnian War in 1995.

=== Venezuelan debt ===
In August 2017, President of the United States Donald Trump imposed sanctions on Venezuela which banned transactions involving Venezuela's state debt including debt restructuring. The technical default period ended 13 November 2017 and Venezuela did not pay coupons on its dollar eurobonds, causing a cross-default on other dollar bonds. A committee consisting of the fifteen largest banks admitted default on state debt obligations which in turn entailed payments on CDS on 30 November.

In November 2017, The Economist estimated Venezuela's debt at US$105 billion and its reserves at US$10 billion. In 2018, Venezuela's debt grew to US$156 billion and as of March 2019, its reserves had dropped to US$8 billion.

With the exception of PDVSA's 2020 bonds, as of January 2019, all of Venezuela's bonds are in default, and Venezuela's government and state-owned companies owe nearly US$8 billion in unpaid interest and principal. As of March 2019, the government and state-owned companies have US$150 billion in debt.

=== Oil industry ===
By 2018 the political and economic troubles facing Venezuela had engulfed the El Tigre-San Tomé region, a key region for oil production in eastern Venezuela. Oil workers were fleeing the state-owned oil company as salaries could not keep up with hyperinflation, reducing families to starvation. Workers and criminals stripped vital oil industry equipment of anything valuable, ranging from pickup trucks to the copper wire within critical oil production components. Oil facilities were neglected and unprotected, crippling oil production and leading to environmental damage. As noted petroleum historian, expert, and former San Tomé resident Emma Brossard stated in 2005, "Venezuelan oil fields had a depletion rate of 25 per cent annually [and] there had to be an investment of US$3.4 billion a year to keep up its production." "But since Chávez has become president there has been no investment."

As of 2020 there were no longer any oil rigs searching for oil in Venezuela, and production has been "reduced to a trickle". Oil exports are expected to total $2.3 billion for 2020, continuing a decline of more than a decade. Pollution from crude oil leaking from abandoned underwater wells and pipelines has caused serious damage to fishing and human health.

In 2022, rising oil prices caused by the Russian invasion of Ukraine led the World Oil Commission to start meetings with the Venezuelan Government to push oil production to have a control over the price. As a consequence of the energy crisis caused by the war, the United States allowed the American oil and gas company Chevron to resume limited operations in Venezuela again.

== Foreign involvement ==
=== Economic sanctions ===
Targeted sanctions against Venezuelan individuals and businesses began as early as 2005, over what the United States said were insufficient efforts by Venezuela to cooperate with its drug enforcement and anti-terrorism efforts. In 2011, the United States sanctioned Venezuela's state-owned oil company Petróleos de Venezuela. On 9 March 2015, Barack Obama signed and issued an executive order declaring Venezuela a national security threat and ordered sanctions against Venezuelan officials. The sanctions did not affect Venezuela's oil company and trade relations with the US continued. In 2017, Trump's administration imposed additional economic sanctions on Venezuela. The new sanctions prohibited Venezuela from borrowing from US financial institutions. The European Union, the Lima Group, the United States and other countries have applied individual sanctions against government officials and members of both the military and security forces. The United States would later extend its sanctions to the petroleum sector. According to The Wall Street Journal, the new 2019 sanctions aimed at depriving the Maduro government of petroleum revenues. During the COVID-19 pandemic, world leaders called for a suspension of economic sanctions, including against Venezuela and Iran, that have "increasingly become the pursuit of war by other means". The US responded by intensifying the sanctions against Venezuela. In June 2021, US banks blocked Venezuela's payments for COVID-19 vaccinations through the Covax program, delaying the first shipment of the vaccines until September.

==== Impact ====
According to executives within the company as well as the Venezuelan government, the 2011 United States sanctions were mostly symbolic and had little effect (if any) on Venezuela's trade with the US since the company's sale of oil to the US and the operations of its US-based subsidiary Citgo were unaffected.

The 2017 US sanctions prevented Venezuela from restructuring PDVSA's debt, because it could not exchange its existing debts for newly issued bonds. Because debt restructuring "is negotiated with groups of bondholders, which would invariably include US bondholders" and because non-US financial institutions feared retaliation from the US, the impact of this restriction went beyond the US financial institutions officially covered by the sanctions. The 2017 sanctions also prevented Citgo from repatriating its profits to Venezuela, blocking the country from receiving billions in dividends.

Sachs and Weisbrot argue that the 40,000 excess deaths measured between 2017 and 2018 are largely attributable to the impact of the 2017 US sanctions. The report was criticized by other economists, who said the impact of the sanctions could not be adequately separated from pre-existing negative trends when determining excess deaths. Sachs and Weisbrot concede that the outcome in a counterfactual scenario without sanctions in but argue that the sanctions "lock Venezuela into a downward economic spiral" by making policies that would ordinarily resolve a similar crisis impossible to implement.Sachs and Weisbrot analyze past instances of hyperinflation in Latin America and note that in historical cases, hyperinflation was brought under control using Exchange Rate Based Stabilization (ERBS) – "creating a new exchange rate system with full convertibility and a managed float of the currency." They argue that sanctions made pursuing an ERBS program impossible "because a peg to the dollar would require access to the dollar-based financial system, which the sanctions have cut off as much as possible." They also argue that sanctions made it impossible for Venezuela to securitize its oil reserves as collateral for a debt restructuring. They conclude that "the counterfactual possibility in the absence of sanctions is not just zero excess deaths, but actually a reduction in mortality and other improvements in health indicators. That is because an economic recovery could have already begun in the absence of economic sanctions."

Michelle Bachelet updated the situation in a 20 March oral report following the visit of a five-person delegation to Venezuela, saying that the social and economic crisis was dramatically deteriorating, the government had not acknowledged or addressed the extent of the crisis, and she was concerned that although the "pervasive and devastating economic and social crisis began before the imposition of the first economic sanctions", the sanctions could worsen the situation.

An October 2020 report published by the Washington Office on Latin America (WOLA) by Venezuelan economist Luis Oliveros found that "while Venezuela's economic crisis began before the first U.S. sectoral sanctions were imposed in 2017, these measures 'directly contributed to its deep decline, and to the further deterioration of the quality of life of Venezuelans' ". The report concluded that economic sanctions "have cost Venezuela's government as much as $31 billion since 2017"

==== Legality ====
In 2019, former UN rapporteur Alfred de Zayas said that US sanctions on Venezuela were illegal as they constituted economic warfare and "could amount to 'crimes against humanity' under international law". In February 2019, Jorge Arreaza, Maduro's Minister for Foreign Affairs, said he was forming a coalition of diplomats who "believe the U.S. and others are violating the U.N. charter against non-interference in member states". During the announcement, he was surrounded by diplomats from 16 other countries, including Russia, China, Iran, North Korea, and Cuba. Arreaza said the cost to the Venezuelan economy of the US blockade was over $30 billion. Reporting on Arreaza's statements, the Associated Press said that Maduro was blocking aid, and "saying that Venezuelans are not beggars and that the move is part of a U.S.-led coup". Alena Douhan, United Nations Special Rapporteur on the negative impact of unilateral coercive measures, was due to visit Venezuela in August 2020 to investigate the impact of international sanctions. Before her visit, 66 Venezuelan NGOs (including PROVEA) asked Douhan in an open letter to consider the harmful impact of sanctions in the context of years of repression, corruption and economic mismanagement that predate the sanctions, and requested she meet independent press and civil society researchers. She arrived on 31 January, and was welcomed on arrival by a government minister and the Venezuelan ambassador to the UN. She declared on her preliminary findings as she left on 12 February: that sanctions against Venezuela have had a "devastating" noticeable impact in both the economy and the population. She said "the increasing number of unilateral sanctions imposed by United States, the European Union and other countries have exacerbated the economic and humanitarian calamities in Venezuela" but that Venezuela's economic decline "began in 2014 with the fall in oil prices" and that "mismanagement and corruption had also contributed." The government welcomed the report, while the opposition accused her of "playing into the hands of the regime" of Maduro. Douhan was harshly criticized by the Venezuelan civil society, and several non-governmental organizations pronounced themselves in social media with the hashtag "#Lacrisisfueprimero" (The crisis came first).

==== Responsibility for the crisis ====
Some US-based economists have argued that the significance of US sanctions on Venezuela is minimal because shortages and high inflation in Venezuela began before US sanctions were directed towards the country. The Wall Street Journal said that economists place the blame for Venezuela's economy shrinking by half on "Maduro's policies, including widespread nationalizations, out-of-control spending that sparked inflation, price controls that led to shortages, and widespread graft and mismanagement." The Venezuelan government has stated that the United States is responsible for its economic collapse. The HRW/Johns Hopkins report noted that most sanctions are "limited to canceling visas and freezing assets of key officials implicated in abuses and corruption. They in no way target the Venezuelan economy." The report also stated that the 2017 ban on dealing in Venezuelan government stocks and bonds allows exceptions for food and medicine, and that the 28 January 2019 PDVSA sanctions could worsen the situation, although "the crisis precedes them". The Washington Post stated that "the deprivation long predates recently imposed US sanctions".

=== Military involvement ===
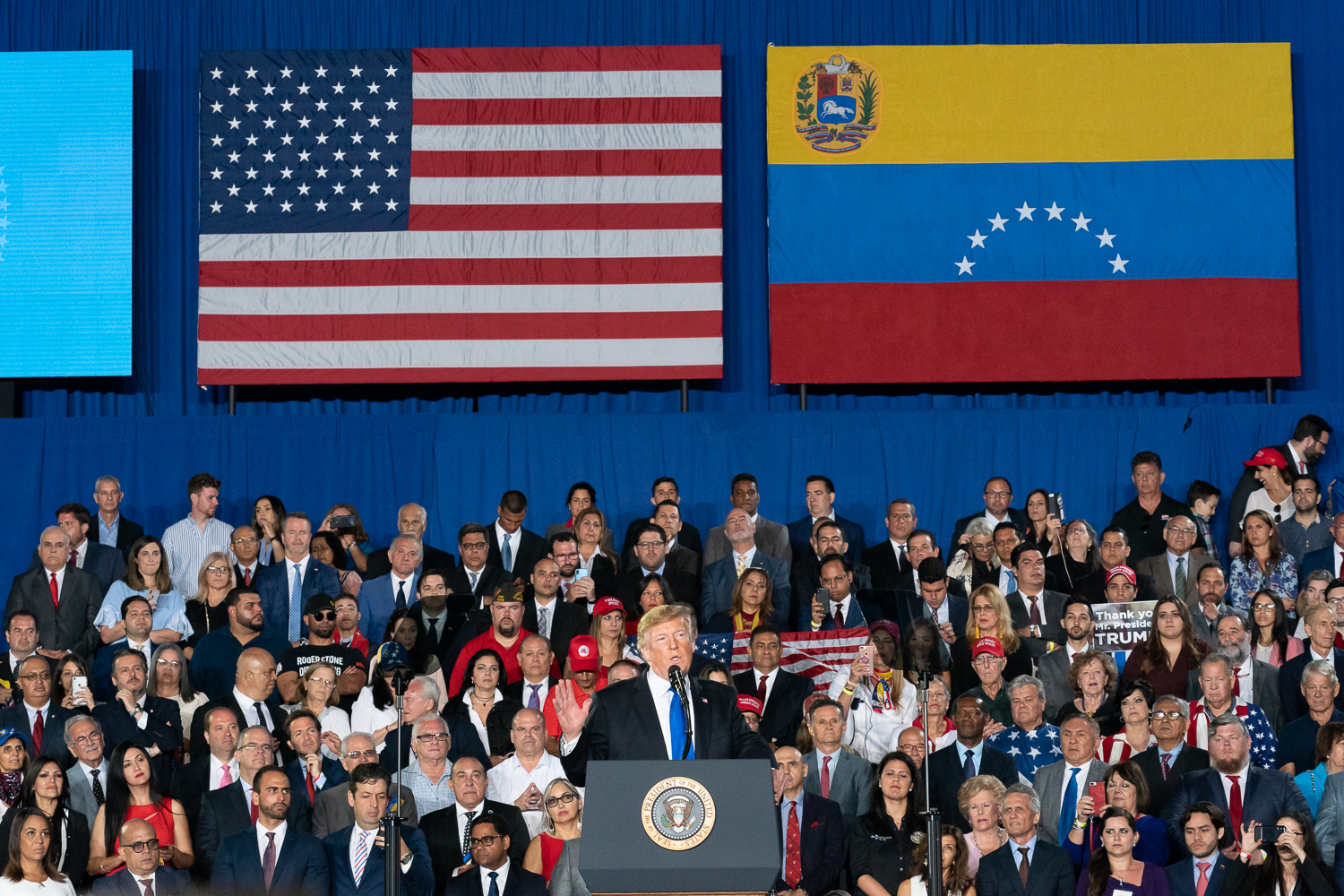
At a 18 February rally in Doral, Florida, President Trump urged Venezuela's military to abandon Nicolás Maduro or 'lose everything'.

On 11 August 2017, President Trump said that he is "not going to rule out a military option" to confront the autocratic government of Nicolás Maduro and the deepening crisis in Venezuela. Military Times said the unnamed aides told Trump it was not wise to even discuss a military solution due to the long history of unpopular intervention in Latin America by the United States. Venezuela's defense minister Vladimir Padrino criticized Trump for the statement, calling it "an act of supreme extremism" and "an act of madness". The Venezuelan communications minister, Ernesto Villegas, said Trump's words amounted to "an unprecedented threat to national sovereignty".

Representatives of the United States were in contact with dissident Venezuelan military officers during 2017 and 2018 but declined to collaborate with them or provide assistance to them. The opinion of other Latin American nations was split with respect to military intervention. Luis Almagro, the Secretary General of the Organization of American States, while visiting Colombia, did not rule out the potential benefit of the use of military force to intervene with the crisis. Canada, Colombia and Guyana, which are members of the Lima Group, refused to sign the organization's document rejecting military intervention in Venezuela.

During the 2019 Venezuelan presidential crisis, allegations of potential United States military involvement began to circulate, with military intervention in Venezuela was already being executed by the governments of Cuba and Russia. According to professor Erick Langer of Georgetown University, while it was being discussed whether the United States would militarily intervene, "Cuba and Russia have already intervened". Hundreds or thousands of Cuban security forces have allegedly been operating in Venezuela while professor Robert Ellis of United States Army War College described the between several dozen and 400 Wagner Group mercenaries provided by Russia as the "palace guard of Nicolás Maduro". Kremlin spokesman Dmitry Peskov denied the deployment of Russian mercenaries, calling it "fake news". On 2 April 2019, the Russian Foreign Ministry rejected Trump's call to "get out" saying their 100 military servicemen now in Venezuela will support Maduro "for as long as needed". In May 2020, Venezuelan dissidents backed by Silvercorp USA attempted to infiltrate Venezuela by sea and overthrow Maduro in Operation Gideon. The raid failed, and the dissidents and mercenaries were killed or captured. The owner of Silvercorp, an ex-US special operations sergeant, said he met with Trump administration officials about the plan.

=== Humanitarian aid ===
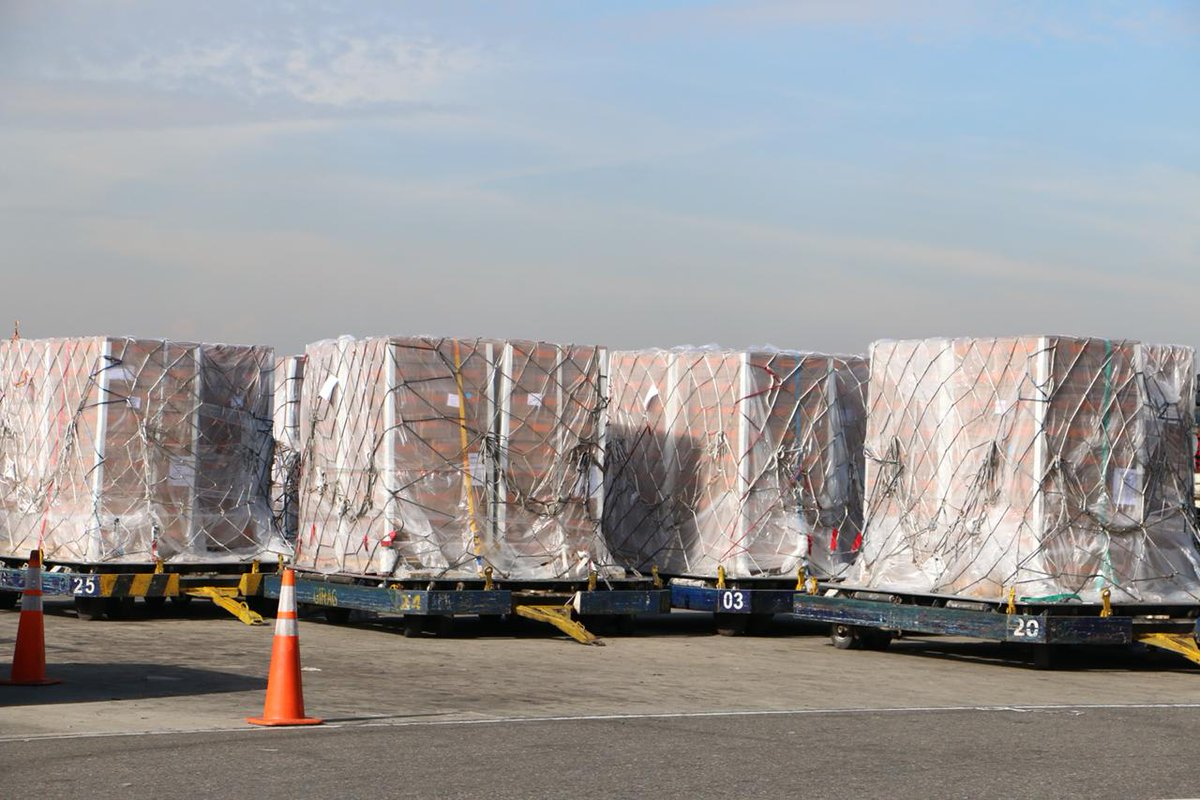
Aid for Venezuela sent by the United States to Colombia

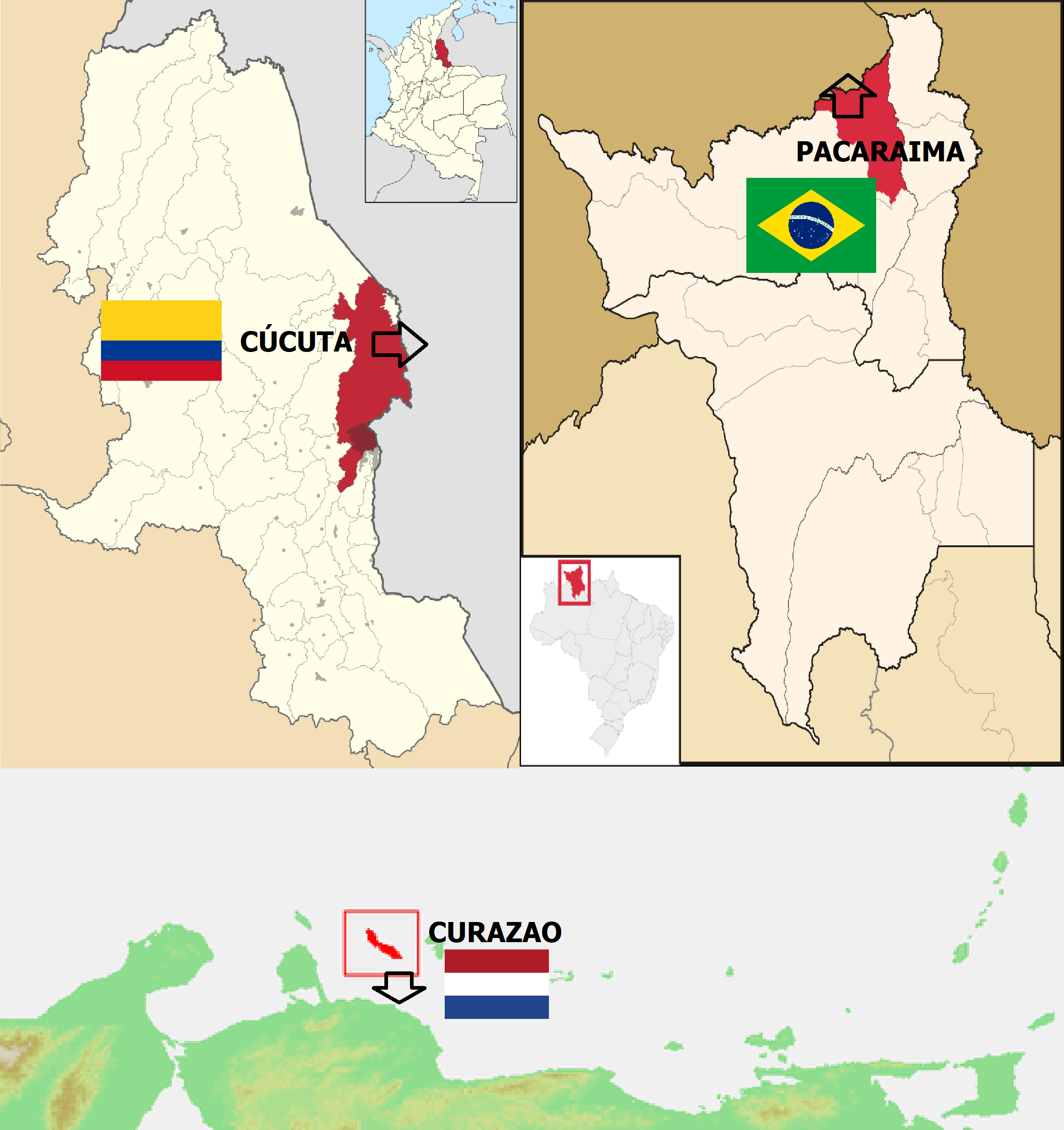
Location of the humanitarian aid points outside of Venezuela

Throughout the crisis, humanitarian aid was provided to Venezuelans in need both within Venezuela and abroad. In October 2018, the USNS Comfort departed for an eleven-week operation in Latin America, with a primary mission being to assist countries who received Venezuelan refugees who fled the crisis in Venezuela. The main goal was to relieve health systems in Colombia, Ecuador, Peru and other nations which faced the arrival of thousands of Venezuelan migrants.

At the end of January 2019, as the US prepared to bring aid across the border, the International Committee of the Red Cross warned the United States about the risk of delivering humanitarian aid without the approval of the government's security forces. The UN similarly warned the US about politicising the crisis and using aid as a pawn in the power struggle. Other humanitarian organisations also raised risks.

On 23 February 2019, 14 trucks carrying 280 tons of humanitarian aid attempted to bring aid across the Simon Bolivar and Francisco de Paula Santander bridges from Colombia. There were clashes, with Venezuelan security forces reported to use tear gas attack in attempt to maintain a blockade of the border. Colombia said around 285 people were injured and at least two trucks set on fire. CNN reported that the Venezuela government accused Guaidó supporters of burning the trucks and noted that "While a CNN team saw incendiary devices from police on the Venezuelan side of the border ignite the trucks, the network's journalists are unsure if the trucks were burned on purpose." In March, The New York Times reported that footage showed that it was anti-Maduro protestors rather than Venezuelan security forces who were responsible for the burning trucks. The New York Times reported that the trucks had been set on fire by anti-Maduro protester who threw a Molotov cocktail that hit one of the trucks. Colombian foreign minister Carlos Holmes Trujillo rejected the claims by The New York Times that the Colombian government manipulated the video of the burning of the aid truck, insisting that Nicolás Maduro was responsible. Responding when asked about the claims in a BBC interview, Juan Guaidó stressed that its findings suggested only a possible theory, that it was the newspaper's point of view and that a total of three trucks were burned, while the footage focused on one. Journalist Karla Salcedo Flores denounced state-run Telesur for plagiarism and the manipulation of her photos for propaganda purposes after the network claimed protesters poured gasoline on the trucks. Agence France-Presse published an investigation disproving Telesur's claims with the photos. Bellingcat reported that since the open source evidence examined for its investigation does not show the moment of ignition, it is not possible to make a definitive determination regarding the cause of the fire.

Franceso Rocca, president of the International Federation of Red Cross and Red Crescent Societies, announced on 29 March 2019 that the Red Cross was preparing to bring humanitarian aid to the country to help ease both the chronic hunger and the medical crisis. The Guardian reported that Maduro had "long denied the existence of a humanitarian crisis, and on 23 February blocked an effort led by Guaidó to bring aid into the country", and that the Red Cross had "brokered a deal" between the Maduro and Guaidó administrations "indicating a seldom-seen middle ground between the two men".

The Red Cross aid shipments were expected to begin within a few weeks, and the first shipment would help about 650,000 people; simultaneously, a leaked UN report estimated that seven million Venezuelans were likely in need of humanitarian assistance. During what The Wall Street Journal called "Latin America's worst humanitarian crisis ever", the "operation would rival Red Cross relief efforts in war-torn Syria, signaling the depth of Venezuela's crisis." Rocca said the efforts would focus first on hospitals, including state-run facilities, and said the Red Cross was open to the possibility of delivering aid products stored on the Venezuelan borders with Colombia and Brazil. He warned that the Red Cross would not accept any political interference, and said the effort must be "independent, neutral, impartial and unhindered".

Maduro and Arreaza met with representative of Red Cross International on 9 April to discuss the aid effort. The Wall Street Journal said that the acceptance of humanitarian shipments by Maduro was his first acknowledgement that Venezuela is "suffering from an economic collapse", adding that "until a few days ago, the government maintained there was no crisis and it didn't need outside help". Guaidó said the acceptance of humanitarian aid was the "result of our pressure and insistence", and called on Venezuelans to "stay vigilant to make sure incoming aid is not diverted for 'corrupt' purposes".

The first Red Cross delivery of supplies for hospitals arrived on 16 April, offering an encouraging sign that the Maduro administration would allow more aid to enter. Quoting Tamara Taraciuk—an expert at Human Rights Watch on Venezuela—who called the situation "a completely man-made crisis", The New York Times said the aid effort in Venezuela presented challenges regarding how to deliver aid in an "unprecedented political, economic and humanitarian crisis" that was "caused largely by the policies of a government intent on staying in power, rather than war or natural disaster". Armed pro-government paramilitaries fired weapons to disrupt the first Red Cross delivery, and officials associated with Maduro's party told the Red Cross to leave.

An April 2021 report by the inspector general at United States Agency for International Development found that the Trump administration had politicized the early 2019 humanitarian aid package and was motivated by regime change in Venezuela more so than ameliorating the humanitarian situation there.

== Public opinion ==
A November 2016 Datincorp survey that asked Venezuelans living in urban areas which entity was responsible for the crisis, 59% blamed chavismo or the presidents (Chávez, 25%; Maduro 19%; Chavismo 15%) while others blamed the opposition (10%), entrepreneurs (4%) and the United States (2%).

A September 2018 Meganálisis survey found that 85% of Venezuelans wanted Maduro to leave power immediately. A November 2018 Datanálisis poll found that 54% of Venezuelans opposed a foreign military intervention to remove Maduro, while 35% supported an intervention. Instead, 63% supported a "negotiated settlement to remove Maduro".

An 11–14 March 2019 survey of 1,100 people in 16 Venezuelan states and 32 cities by Meganálisis found that 89% of respondents wanted Maduro to leave the presidency. A Datanálisis poll on 4 March 2019 found Maduro's approval rating at an all-time low of 14%.

According to Datanálisis, in early 2019, 63% of Venezuelans believed that a change of government was possible. Fourteen months later, in May 2020, after the Macuto Bay raid, the percentage decreased to 20%.

According to economists interviewed by The New York Times, the situation is by far the worst economic crisis in Venezuela's history, and is also the worst facing a country in peace time since the mid-20th century. The crisis is also more severe than that of the United States during the Great Depression, the 1985–1994 Brazilian economic crisis, or the 2008–2009 hyperinflation in Zimbabwe. Other writers have also compared aspects of the crisis, such as unemployment and GDP contraction, to that of Bosnia and Herzegovina after the 1992–1995 Bosnian War, and those in Russia, Cuba and Albania following the collapse of the Eastern Bloc in 1989 and the dissolution of the Soviet Union in 1991.

== See also ==
- Fuel shortages in Venezuela
- Guaire miners
- Pemon conflict – a theatre of the Venezuelan crisis
