= 2024 Venezuelan blackouts =

Nationwide series of power outages

- Part of Energy crisis in Venezuela
- Date: 27 August 2024 – ongoing
- Time: (VET)
- Location: Venezuela (nationwide)
- Type: Power outage
- Cause: Energy crisis in Venezuela
- Outcome: Total and partial blackouts in all Venezuelan states

The 2024 Venezuelan blackouts were a series of interruptions to Venezuela's electrical service nationwide. The interruptions began on 27 August with a blackout that affected 12 states in the country at around 7:12 pm VET, lasting until service restorations began at approximately 8:30 pm. On 30 August, another blackout was recorded that left more than 20 states in the country without electricity, beginning at 4:50 am and leaving a significant portion of the nation without power for 12 hours, with harder-hit areas not having power for 20 hours. Outages were again reported in Caracas on 1 September, continuing as of 3 September and through 5 September.

Highly dependent on the hydroelectric plant at Guri Dam, Venezuela has experienced frequent electrical outages for at least a decade; the administration of Nicolás Maduro often attributes blackouts to those who oppose him, while experts and the opposition attribute them to poor maintenance and a lack of infrastructure investment, official corruption and incompetence, and a loss of talented workers due to the Venezuelan refugee crisis.

The Maduro administration attributed the blackouts to an alleged sabotage against the country's electrical system, without specifying the culprits and without giving more information. In the context of the political crisis following the 2024 Venezuelan presidential election, Diosdado Cabello—recently appointed by Maduro as Minister of the Interior, Justice and Peace—claimed that the government already had information about alleged attacks and would enforce justice based on its findings. On 4 September, without revealing any other information, Cabello said 11 people had been arrested.

== History ==
An energy crisis in Venezuela has resulted in blackouts for a decade in most of the country, and 15 years in the western state of Zulia. Several Venezuelan states experience blackouts frequently, and outages occur daily in the western part of the country. Infobae stated in August 2024 that "unofficial estimates" are that Venezuela has about 200 daily power outages, with frequent complaints to Corpoelec, the state-run power company.

Much of Venezuela's electrical power comes from a very large hydroelectric plant at Guri Dam that was built in the 1960s; according to the Associated Press, that system "has been burdened by poor upkeep, a lack of alternative energy supplies and a drain of engineering talent as an estimated 8 million Venezuelan migrants have fled economic misery in recent years". Agence France-Press stated that "many experts attribute" frequent electrical outages "to official corruption and a lack of investment in distribution networks".

The largest nationwide outages occurred in 2019, with multiple blackouts lasting days. According to Infobae, the Maduro administration stated in September 2023 that an unnamed Chinese company would modernize the power network, but the problems since the 2019 blackouts have not been resolved as of 2024.

The frequent and common blackouts in all parts of the country result in telephone and internet service interruptions, and problems with access to drinking water, leading to citizen protests over disruptions in daily activities. There were at least 416 such protests in 2023 according to the NGO Venezuelan Observatory of Social Conflict (Observatorio Venezolano de Conflictividad Social, OVCS). In February 2024, OVCS stated in its annual report that power outages have led to daily complaints from citizens; the human rights organization PROVEA said the deterioration should not continue to become accepted and "normalized".

=== 27 August ===
The electrical blackout reportedly began at around 7:12 pm VET. As of 7:30 pm, through social networks and mainly on Twitter/X, users reported a blackout that left several areas of Caracas without electricity and totally or partially affected the states of Zulia, Falcón, Lara, Carabobo, Mérida, Táchira, Miranda, Nueva Esparta, Sucre, Guárico, Bolívar, Aragua, La Guaira, Trujillo, Anzoátegui, and Yaracuy.

El Carabobeño, a newspaper in the Central Region of Venezuela, reported that an electrical fluctuation occurred at 7:15 pm VET on 27 August in several Venezuelan states and in the capital Caracas. Power returned briefly before a second fluctuation occurred at 7:30 pm VET, lasting longer than the first in many of the affected regions.

=== 30 August ===
At around 4:50 am VET on 30 August, another blackout caused severe power disruptions in several states and Caracas; Minister of Communications Freddy Ñáñez said on state-run Venezolana de Televisión that all of Venezuela's states were at least partially affected.

By roughly 1 pm VET, power began to return to some sections of Maracaibo, Valencia, Puerto Ordaz, and Caracas, but reports on social networks indicated that power was not restored to the harder-hit western states of Zulia, Falcón and Lara for a full 20 hours.

=== 1 September ===
Several neighborhoods in Caracas were again without electricity several hours after power was restored from the 30 August blackout. No explanation for the outages was provided as of 2 September, but heavy rainfall was reported to have led to outages in Caracas as well as other states.

=== 2 September ===
The states of Miranda and Aragua experienced power outages on 2 September, with El Hatillo Municipality particularly affected; users complained that Corpoelec was not responding.

=== 3 September ===
A power outage affected Caracas and 16 states at 1:25 pm on 3 September.

Maturín, the capital city of the state of Monagas, was still experiencing unscheduled and unannounced daily blackouts as of 3 September lasting between three and four hours.

=== 5 September ===
Users from Caracas and 8 states reported power outages at 2:50 pm on 5 September.

== Effects ==
=== Oil industry and other commerce ===
Operations impacted by the 30 August blackout included the state oil company PDVSA and its largest terminal that handles roughly 70% of Venezuelan oil exports, as well as its headquarters in Caracas. Blackouts also impacted the operations of oil upgrader company Petropiar, the main Venezuelan crude oil export terminal for Chevron.

Caracas workers gathered outside their office buildings while awaiting instructions from leadership on whether to stay or go home.

=== Media access ===
According to VE Sin Filtro, a non-governmental organization that monitors internet censorship, 86% of Internet connectivity was affected by the 27 August outages.

=== Transportation ===
Minister of Transport Ramon Velasquez reported that Caracas Metro service was stopped due to the outages, and that over 250 buses would replace the trains until power returned.

=== Hospitals ===
Venezuela's health ministry reported that roughly 79 public hospitals were still operational.

Citizens reported on social media that hospitals without generators had to limit services, as did some hospitals who limited services to emergencies due to the limited capacity of their power plants, with some patients on dialysis affected. El Diario de Caracas reported that "Humiades Urbina, director of the National Academy of Medicine, said that between 30 and 40 health centers in the interior of the country do not have functioning emergency and intensive care units during blackouts."

=== Stockpiling ===
Despite reassurances from newly appointed Interior Minister Diosdado Cabello that power would gradually return, Al Jazeera stated on 30 August that residents in cities such as Barquisimeto began to stockpile food and gasoline in anticipation of further blackouts, with eyewitnesses reporting that gas station lines extended to about 5 kilometres (3.1 miles).

== Causes ==
Maduro's administration attributed the cause of the 30 August outage to "electrical sabotage". Communications Minister Ñáñez stated that "Nobody will take away the peace and tranquility of the Venezuelan people"; he called the attack a "desperate" attempt to remove Maduro from power by the opposition, stating: "The entire national government has been activated to overcome this new aggression." In an interview on state channel Venezolana de Televisión, he directly attributed the problem to sabotage and named opposition leaders María Corina Machado and Edmundo González as responsible, claiming the "sabotage" was part of a "coup plan". According to the news media site Infobae, these accusations could lead to an escalation of persecution and repression against anti-Maduro political opposition.

Maduro stated on social media that "desperate fascism" was attacking the government and its people, and he vowed to "remain alongside the people on the front lines in the battle against this criminal attack". A Reuters article stated on 30 August: "Maduro, who is locked in a dispute with the opposition over the outcome of a July 28 presidential election, has often held his political rivals responsible for what he says are 'attacks' on the power grid, accusations the opposition has always denied."

During the 2019 Venezuelan blackouts, authorities of the Maduro administration also claimed that the hydroelectric plant at Guri Dam had been sabotaged, and also blamed "the opposition and the governments of the United States and Colombia", according to Spain's EFE news agency. Argentina's La Nación states that "opposition leaders and experts, contrary to the theory of sabotage, blame the government for lack of investment, incompetence and corruption." The Associated Press also compared the 2024 outages to the 2019 blackouts: "Venezuela in 2019, during a period of political unrest, suffered from regular power outages that the government almost always blamed on its opponents, but that energy experts said were the result of brush fires damaging transmission lines and poor maintenance of the country’s hydroelectric infrastructure."

Two electrical engineers were interviewed by El Diario de Caracas in September 2024: Víctor Poleo, who was Venezuela's Vice Minister of Energy and Mines between 1999 and 2001, and José Aguilar, an international consultant on energy risks. Both said the 2019 and 2024 blackouts were caused by lack of maintenance, management failures, and misallocation of the more than US$100 billion spent on electricity between 1999 and 2017. Aguilar criticized the administration's lack of transparency about the power situation in Venezuela. He told Efecto Cocuyo that the 30 August "failure occurred during a time of low electricity demand, which should have made the system easier to manage, but instead exposed its vulnerability", adding that the administration "has not provided public data on the state of the system in more than 5,000 days, which prevents an accurate assessment of the situation".

== Reactions ==
In the context of the political crisis following the 2024 Venezuelan presidential election, Cabello claimed that the cause of the 30 August blackout was an alleged "terrorist attack" on a transmission tower of line 765, which includes Valle de La Pascua and Valencia, Carabobo, and accused the Venezuelan opposition of being the authors of the attack, without presenting evidence or giving further information to support the claim.

Opposition member Juan Pablo Guanipa dismissed accusations by Maduro and his government officials that terrorism or sabotage by the opposition caused the blackouts, retorting on Twitter/X that "This narrative isn't believed by even the most radical Chavistas."

On 4 September, without revealing any other information, Cabello said 11 people had been arrested.

== See also ==
Venezuela

- Energy policy of Venezuela
- Roberto Marrero § Arrest and detention – opposition attorney imprisoned and accused of being involved in the 2019 Venezuelan blackouts
- Things Are Never So Bad That They Can't Get Worse – New York Times journalist book covering the 2019 Venezuelan blackouts
- Zulia energy collapse

Other

- List of major power outages
- 2024 Lebanon blackout
- 2024 Cuba blackout
