= Energy crisis in Venezuela =

Venezuela has experienced a marked deficit in the generation of electrical energy. The immediate cause of the energy crisis was a prolonged drought that caused the water in the reservoir of the Simón Bolívar Hydroelectric Plant to reach very low levels. Although various measures were taken to overcome the crisis, one of the most controversial was the implementation of a program of electrical rationing throughout the country, except in the capital Caracas, which was ultimately officially suspended in June 2010, due to the recovery of reservoirs due to the rains, and not to interrupt the transmission of the 2010 FIFA World Cup. Power cuts have continued to occur in the interior of the country, although with less frequency and duration, this time driven by failures in other parts of the system. The situation of "electrical emergency" decreed by the government on 21 December 2009 was suspended on 30 November 2010; however, on 14 May 2011, after the country experienced two national blackouts, the government of Hugo Chávez announced a temporary rationing plan and acknowledged that the electricity system continued to face "generation weaknesses" that they did not expect to surpass until the end of the year.

The energy problem was widely politicized in Venezuela: in addition to the drought, the Chávez government also blamed wealthy sectors of the population of the crisis, assuring that they wasted electricity. The Venezuelan opposition responded by holding the government itself responsible, accusing it of not having made the necessary investments to keep pace with the country's electricity consumption growth, as well as having neglected the electricity infrastructure, which was completely nationalized a few years before.

According to United Nations Economic Commission for Latin America and the Caribbean (ECLAC), the electricity crisis was one of the factors that contributed to the economic crisis that Venezuela experienced since 2009, which in turn is credited with giving way to the ongoing crisis in Venezuela. Furthermore, this crisis also influenced the notable increase in votes that the Venezuelan opposition experienced in the 2010 parliamentary elections.

== Causes and characteristics ==
Venezuela, the main oil exporter in South America, suffered from a long drought that significantly reduced the volume of water in the dams of hydroelectric plants. For 2009, 73% of the electric energy consumed by Venezuelans depended on these plants. Additionally, the country's electricity consumption has been increasing by 6% per year, a percentage that exceeds the growth rate in the electrical supply that has been installed.

Most of Venezuela's power comes from one of the largest hydroelectric dams in the world, Guri Dam in Bolívar State, Venezuela on the Caroni River; as of 2019, 70–80% of Venezuela's power comes from Guri. Venezuela has a history of electrical blackouts dating at least to 2010; Juan Nagel wrote in Foreign Policy in 2016 that the problems resulted from "massive government corruption [...] and the country’s disastrous energy policies". Univision also reported that the problems in the energy sector resulted from corruption and "lack of maintenance and investment". A report from Transparency Venezuela said that maintenance was abandoned for twenty years beginning in 1998. The aging infrastructure made the problems worse, and critics were silenced; a union leader for state power workers was arrested in 2018 by the Bolivarian Intelligence Service for warning that a blackout was likely.

The private company, Electricidad de Caracas was owned by the United States' AES Corporation until 2007; according to The Wall Street Journal, "Venezuela's power grid was once the envy of Latin America". Then-President Hugo Chávez created the state-run Corpoelec by nationalizing the electric sector and expelling private industry in 2007; hence, the state has been solely responsible for energy supply for over ten years. Univision says Chávez "admitted failures (...) such as the 'insufficient' availability of the thermoelectric generation plant and the limitations of the national electric power transmission network and distribution systems"; he signed a decree in 2010 declaring a "State of Emergency of the National Electric Service". Chávez had Corpoelec speed up projects, and bypassing the process of public bidding for projects, he "authorized 'contracting by direct award'," which facilitated corruption.

=== Low level of the Guri reservoir ===
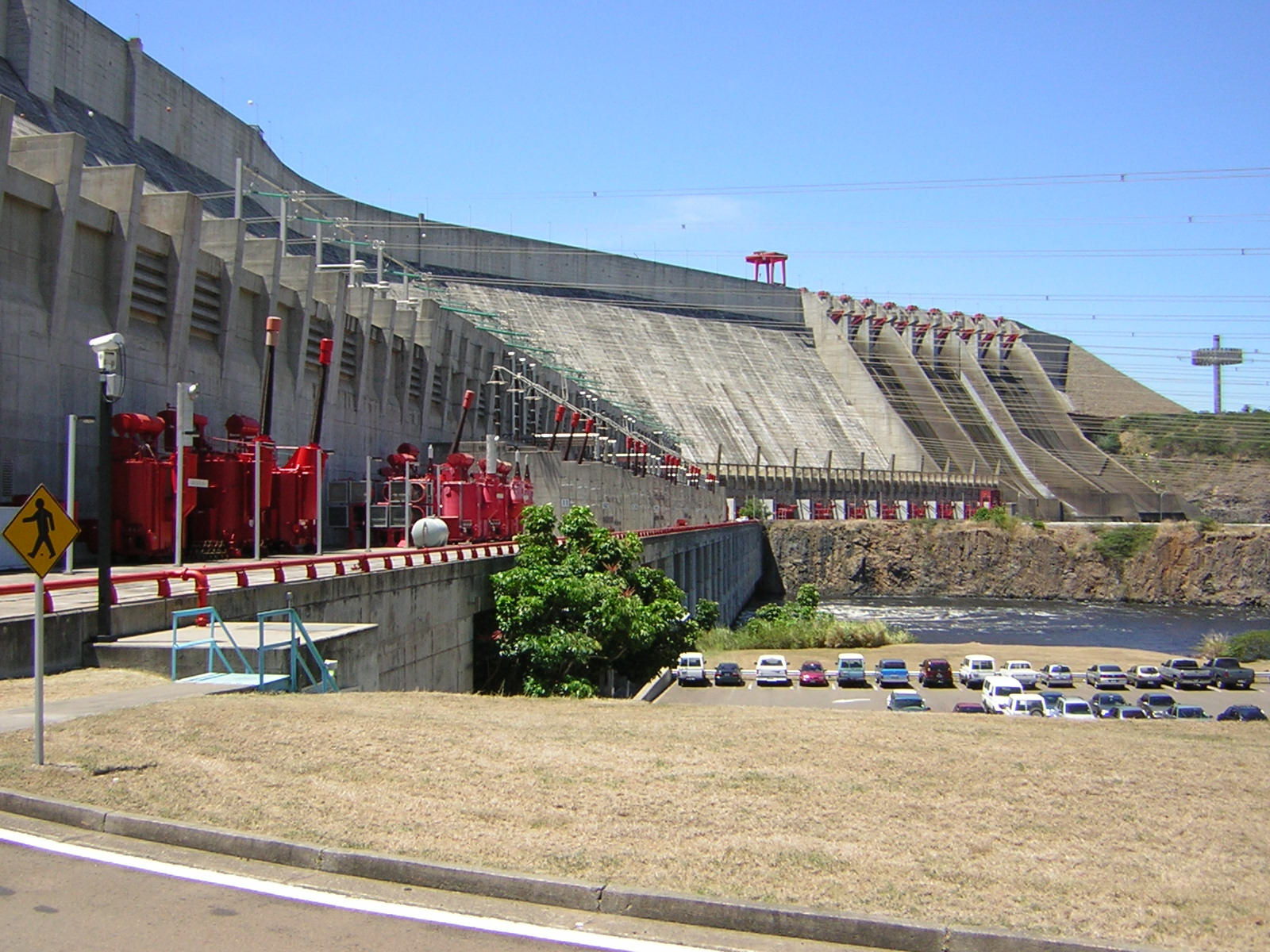
Simón Bolívar Hydroelectric Plant, on the Guri Dam

The main power plant of the hydroelectric system is the Simón Bolívar Hydroelectric Plant, with a generation capacity of 10,000 MW, but which generated only 5,000 MWh after being affected by the drought, and by the beginning of February 2010, the level of the dam had dropped nine meters below its optimum level. If the level of the Guri reservoir falls below 240 masl, some turbines in the plant could not work, and the country's electricity supply would decrease. The government foresaw that if nothing were done, this level would be reached in May 2010, so it began to execute a series of measures that seek to reduce electricity demand and minimize Venezuela's dependence on hydroelectric power plants. By the end of March 2010, this date had been postponed to June 2010.

The possibility that the Guri reservoir reached the critical level was first seen by President Hugo Chávez on 31 January 2010, by ensuring that if the companies did not reduce their electricity consumption "70% of the country would be left without electric service". On 9 March, Chávez was more emphatic about it, declaring:

The Guri is 13 meters away from what they call the collapse level. If these parameters were reached, the Guri plants would have to be turned off, which generate electricity for half of Venezuela. That is the reality.

— Hugo Chávez, 9 March 2010

Subsequently, on 18 March, the Minister of Electric Power, Alí Rodríguez Araque, accused the Venezuelan opposition of causing fear in the population by talking about a "collapse." Operating below this level is dangerous because steam could enter the turbines, a phenomenon known as cavitation, that can cause mechanical damage to them.

By April 15, 2010, the Guri reservoir reached 8.79 meters above the collapse level; however, the next day its level increased by one centimeter, the first increase reported in months. On 23 April, the Minister of the Environment, Alejandro Hitcher, assured that the Guri would reach a normal growth rate within fifteen or twenty days. However, according to Miguel Lara, former general manager of the Interconnected Systems Operation Office, the crisis continued due to problems in the thermal generation park and transmission lines, although he recognized that it is unlikely that the Guri will collapse.

=== Thermal park deficiency ===
The National Electric Corporation, the public body that manages all electricity generating companies, acknowledged that by the end of 2008, 79% of thermoelectric plants were more than 20 years old, and that 30% were unavailable due to technical problems. In addition, of the plants that were working, many did not do so at full capacity: 3,800 MW were generated, when the installed capacity was 9,051 MW.

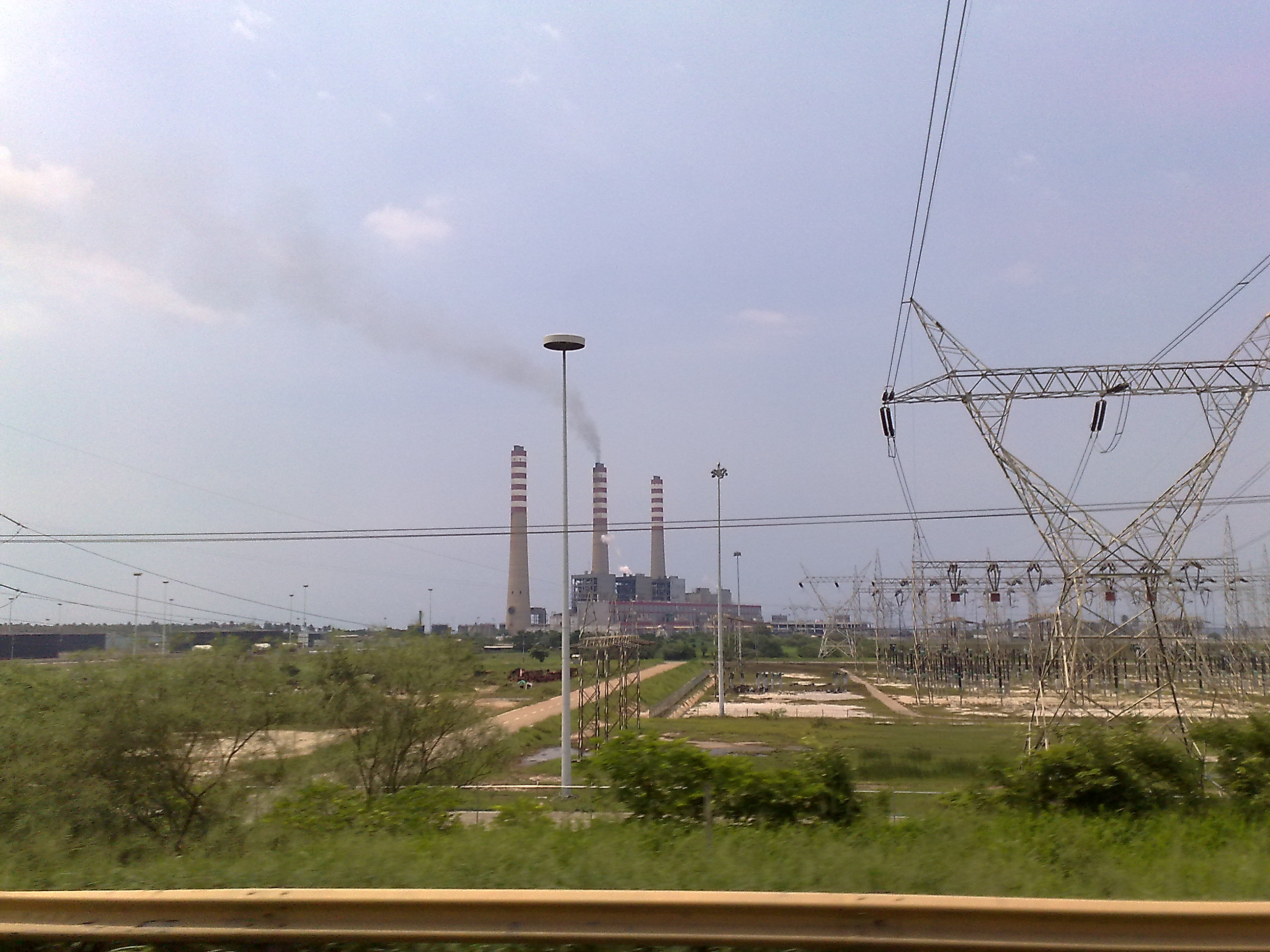
Planta Centro, Carabobo

One of the main thermoelectric plants in the country, Planta Centro, has an installed capacity of 2,000 MW, divided into five units of 400 MW each. In the last few months only two units were operational, generating about 450 MW. Although the funds to reactivate an additional unit were delivered months before, for the start of the crisis the work was 21 months behind. Subsequently, on 27 March, a unit was stopped for maintenance. By the beginning of April 2010, Planta Centro operates only with a unit of 400 MW, which is only generating 250 MW. Electrical specialists believe that Planta Centro is unlikely to recover in the short term, claiming lack of maintenance in recent years as the main cause.

Other plants presented similar situations: the Pedro Camejo plant produced 50% of its capacity "for reasons of fuel and associated transmission"; and the Josefa Camejo plant operated at 33% of its capacity. Additionally, operating plants have reduced their generation since the beginning of the crisis: Plant Tacoa in Vargas had to shut down a unit of 377 MW in April, and plant Ramon Laguna stopped two machines that generated 253 MW in Zulia.

=== Disparity in the increase in demand and electric supply ===
Even before the 2009-2010 drought, there was already a disparity between the increase in supply and demand for electricity in Venezuela; the latter had been increasing at a rate of 7% per year since 2005. This deficit has been criticized by the opposition, alleging that in previous years the Venezuelan government did not make the necessary investments to increase power generation capacity at the same rate as the increase in demand. On the other hand, the government has accused sectors of the population of "wasting" electricity, and has highlighted the fact that Venezuela is the country with the highest electricity consumption per capita in Latin America.

According to figures from the Office of Operation of Interconnected Systems, the Chávez government completed less than half of the investments in thermoelectric energy generation planned in 2005. Alí Rodríguez has denied that the government has not made the necessary investments, although he acknowledged that there are delays in the execution of projects.

=== Saturation of distribution and transmission lines ===
On 21 April 2010, a power cut was reported from the east to the west of the country, affecting 15 of the 24 states of Venezuela. Due to the distribution of the fault, Ciro Portillo, former vice president of Enelven, has assured that it is due to overload in one of the three transmission lines that start from the Guri. Before the crisis, the transmission lines were transmitting 1,000 MW over their capacity during the peak hours. The high temperatures Venezuela experiences between April and May also influence the saturation of these lines. The company Enelven, responsible for the affected areas, has not reported on the causes of this energy slump. For its part, the National Management Center has reported that Cadafe-Occidente overloads transmission lines daily.

== Responses ==
=== Investments ===
In 2009, the Chávez administration declared a national electric emergency and invested $100 billion US dollars towards solving it. The Chávez administration "distributed million-dollar contracts without bidding that enriched high officials of his government and the works were never built", according to Univision. The Wall Street Journal stated that the government awarded electrical contracts to companies with little experience in the energy sector. Billions of dollars were awarded in contracts for projects that were never completed, leading to international investigations of "high officials of the Chavez regime today persecuted for plundering the coffers of the Bolivarian Republic". Critics say that one company, Derwick Associates, was given projects although they had no previous experience; Derwick denies any bribes were involved. Of 40 energy projects approved between 2010 and 2014 analyzed by Transparency Venezuela, 17 are not completed as of March 2019, none are operating at capacity, and overcharging by billions of dollars was identified. In 2017, the National Assembly investigated the $100 billion dollars invested in the electrical system and determined that over $80 billion was embezzled, that more than 14 thermoelectric stations were not functioning, and that neither the electrical transmission nor the distribution system had adequate maintenance.

=== Installation of thermoelectric plants ===
President Chávez set a goal of installing 6,000 MW in 2010 through thermoelectric plants, an increase in the electricity supply greater than what has been installed during his then-eleven years in office. In addition, the estimated cost of the plan was of more than US$5,000 million.

=== Rationing in Caracas ===
Initially, an electric rationing plan was implemented in Caracas, the Venezuelan capital, but it was suspended days later amid protests, which also led to the departure of then-Minister of Electric Energy Ángel Rodríguez, who was replaced by Rodríguez Araque. A new electricity service charge scheme was implemented for users who consume more than 500 kWh per month, who have been identified as "high consumers" by the government. In addition, industries were ordered to reduce by 20% its electricity consumption, with a penalty of temporary interruption of the service in case they did not reach the goal. According to the director of the Chamber of Commerce of Caracas, this last measure was an attempt by the government to "blame the companies for the crisis".

=== Rationing in the rest of the country ===
In the rest of Venezuela, an electric rationing system was implemented by zones. Before Holy Week in 2010, the power supply was cut by about 3 hours at a frequency of 3 or 4 days. On average, outside of Caracas, Venezuela experienced an interruption in electrical service of between 9 and 12 hours a week.

However, the results were not as expected; between January and February, a reduction in demand of 3% was experienced, while the goal set by President Chávez was 20%. After Easter, the frequency and duration of electricity supply cuts would increase in all of Venezuela except in Caracas: The Venezuelan inside the country experienced daily cuts of four hours, that is, more than 20 hours per week.

The Venezuelan government ruled out interrupting the electricity supply in Caracas, even if the Guri reservoir reaches the emergency level. In this case, rationing would be accentuated in the Venezuelan territory corresponding to the Guiana Shield, eastern Venezuela, and the Central-Falcón zone. The Venezuelan opposition criticized the idea of applying rationing to the rest of Venezuela except the capital as "discriminatory".

At the end of April, Corpoelec ordered greater rationing, this time without prior notice and at night. Blackouts due to this cause have been reported in the states of Aragua, Anzoátegui, Mérida, Sucre, Táchira and Zulia.

=== Reduction of activities in basic industries ===
SIDOR's basic industries in Venezuela's side of the Guiana Shield have been hit hard by the crisis, whose production had already fallen by 40% in December 2009, after the Electricity Ministry set a 300 MW consumption limit; before the crisis, SIDOR consumed 800 MW. By February 2010, SIDOR operated at only 45% of its capacity, and 30,000 tons of metal billets were imported to Brazil to meet national demand.

The government did not rule out paralyzing the activities of these industries completely, due to the high energy consumption that their processes require. In addition, three power plants were acquired to allow SIDOR to generate its own energy. It was expected that by the end of May 2010, the first of these plants would start generating the first 175 MW out of a total of 425 MW.

=== Import of electric power from Colombia ===
In 2011, due to the crisis and electricity deficit, electrical energy began to be imported from Colombia. The transfer is made through Cuestecitas-Cuatricentenario, through the exclusive commercial representative Isagen. Electric exports to Venezuela are also made from Norte de Santander through the San Mateo-Corozo circuit, with which Isagen has a connection contract through which 27.52 GWh have been exported.

== Official suspension of rationing and new blackouts ==
On 22 May, the Venezuelan government announced the suspension of rationing on weekends and holidays, and off-peak hours throughout the country. Rationing would then be maintained only on weekdays during peak hours, due to the partial recovery of the reservoirs thanks to the arrival of rains and the inauguration of some electrical works.

On 10 June, President Chávez ordered the suspension of rationing, although he acknowledged that if peak hours were to exceed the limit of the transmission lines, rationing could be applied in that period. In addition, the state of electrical emergency would be maintained, as well as the rationing schedule in the public offices, at least until 30 July 2010. Chávez also acknowledged that the production of the basic companies of Guayana "went to the ground, but the worst is over". On 17 June, the Minister for Electric Power, Alí Rodríguez, declared that the electricity crisis had not ended, but that "the worst has happened." The suspension of rationing was carried out due to the recovery of the reservoirs for the rains and not to interrupt the transmission of the 2010 FIFA World Cup.

However, despite the fact that the Guri reservoir reached its maximum level at the end of August 2010, power cuts have continued to happen. According to the newspaper El Tiempo, Barcelona and Puerto la Cruz, two cities of Anzoátegui state, went almost 62 hours without electricity in a period of six days, due to faults in circuits and substations. In other parts of the country, the blackouts would be driven by faults in the transmission lines, and because several units of the Simón Bolívar Hydroelectric Plant is under maintenance. Chavismo spokespeople also hinted that there was "sabotage", claiming that they believed it was "very suspicious" that the blackouts intensified when the Guri reservoir reached its peak, others have accused the Venezuelan opposition directly, and even the United States of sabotage. However, there has also been recognition of inefficiency on the part of the government:

There is inefficiency too, many of us are learning to govern ... It takes at least 20 years for us to learn to govern.

— Perfecto Abreu, spokesman of the Communist Party of Venezuela

== Consequences ==
Venezuela presented a GDP contraction of 3.3% in 2009, leading the energy crisis to prolong the recession in 2010. Additionally, the transfer of power generation from hydroelectric to thermoelectric increased domestic consumption of petroleum products and natural gas, causing a drop in Venezuelan exports, that had already experienced a 17% drop in 2009. The Minister of Energy and Mines, Rafael Ramírez, calculated that Venezuela would need 100,000 barrels of diesel fuel a day to maintain the thermoelectric plants working, once they are all operational.

Although the government has blamed the El Niño phenomenon exclusively for the crisis, several polls indicate that the majority of Venezuelans blamed the Chávez government, accusing him of not having invested enough to offset the demand. For his part, Chávez accused the opposition of seeking political gains from the energy crisis.

There were two major blackouts in 2013. In 2016, Venezuela had a severe electricity crisis that caused blackouts, industry shutdowns, and the decision by then-President Nicolás Maduro to cut back on government employees' work hours. Maduro's administration has put rationing in place several times, and changed the country's clocks to accommodate a daytime commute. Nagel wrote in 2016, "... there are two main reasons for the crisis: excessive electricity consumption and insufficient production. And the root of both of these problems is bad governance: populism, poor planning, inflexible ideology, and overwhelming corruption." In 2017, there were more than 18,000 power outages nationwide.

== See also ==
- 2024 Venezuelan blackouts
- 2019 Venezuelan blackouts
- Zulia energy collapse
- Energy crisis
