= Alejandro Betancourt López =

Venezuelan businessman

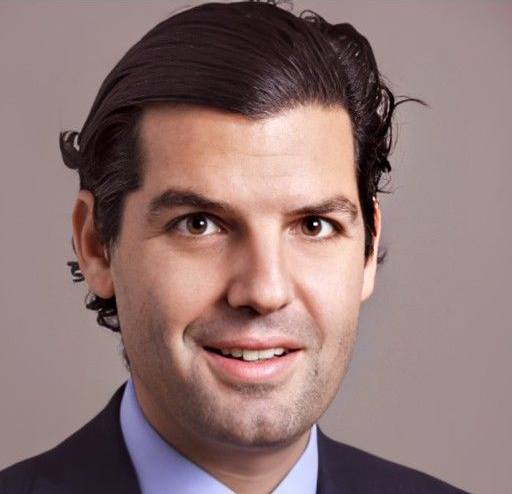
- Alejandro Betancourt
- Born: 1980 (age 45–46); Caracas, Venezuela
- Education: Suffolk University; Oxford University
- Occupations: Chairman and CEO of Derwick Associates; President of Hawkers
- Spouse: Andreína Rojas (m. 2012)
- Website: Personal website

Leopoldo Alejandro Betancourt López (born 1980) is a Venezuelan billionaire businessman. He is chairman and CEO of Derwick Associates and leads the international investment group O'Hara Administration. Betancourt is the director of Pacific Exploration & Production Corporation, a petroleum company. He controls North American Blue Energy Partners (NABEP), the second-largest private oil company in Venezuela, which entered into a joint venture deal with the second Trump administration to control roughly a fifth of Venezuela’s oil reserves. He is also president of Hawkers, a Spanish sunglasses company, Betancourt has been linked to corruption Venezuela since 2003 and as of 2026 is investigated for money laundering and tax fraud investigations in Switzerland and Spain, while United States officials of the second Trump Administration lobbied during 2026 to resolve the money-laundering investigation to avoid criminal charges.

== Early life and education ==
Betancourt was born in Caracas.

He obtained a double major in Economics and Business Administration from Suffolk University of Massachusetts and an Executive MBA from Oxford University.

== Career ==
Betancourt started his career at a company specializing in the exploration, production and trade of oil and its derivatives. The company has presence in the U.S., Europe, Middle East, South America and Africa. There, he served as business manager for Latin America.

He later worked at Guruceaga Group, a company dedicated to international trade in goods, finance, real estate and farm, in which he was manager of new business. He also worked at BGB Energy, a company that was responsible for representing, in joint venture with the old GESCA GAS in Venezuela, international corporation Kawasaki Heavy Industries.

=== Derwick ===
Betancourt was the co-founder, along with Pedro Trebbau López, of Derwick Associates Corp., a Venezuelan company working in the energy sector and co-founded eponymous companies in Panama, the United States, Spain, and Barbados.

Since it started operations in 2003, the company has obtained eleven contracts for the construction of power plants in Venezuela; five contracts awarded by Electricidad de Caracas (to join Corpoelec in December 2011), five by Petroleos de Venezuela SA (PDVSA negotiated with Bariven, a PDVSA division), and one by Corporación Venezolana de Guayana (CVG).

Betancourt has been linked to corruption scandals in Venezuela since before 2006. Derwick was reportedly awarded government projects despite having limited experience in the electricity sector. Derwick denies the allegations.

In 2014 Thor Leonardo Halvorssen Mendoza sued Derwick and Betancourt. Banco Banesco and Derwick Associates claimed that the accusations were false; the lawsuit was dismissed. A 2021 Miami Herald investigation reported that funds tied to an alias identified by several sources as Betancourt had allegedly been transferred by his cousin Francisco Convit, though Betancourt was not charged, since investigators found no evidence he participated in or was aware of the alleged scheme.

In 2025, Betancourt was investigated by judge Santiago Pedraz of the Audiencia Nacional (Spain's High Court), following a complaint filed by Spain’s Anti-Corruption Prosecutor’s Office in connection with an alleged money-laundering scheme involving funds from PDVSA. The case, originated from a legal-assistance request sent by the Zurich prosecutor's office on September 2024. On 17 June 2025 the Office of the Prosecution Ministry filed a complaint against six Venezuelan businessmen, including Betancourt. Betancourt was detained in London in September 2025 under a Spanish arrest warrant and released hours later after questioning. The secrecy order on the proceedings was lifted on 11 November 2025.

In March 2026, Pedraz dismissed the case, finding that Venezuelan courts had already examined the origin of the funds and determined that no crime had occurred. However in June 2026, the Criminal Chamber (Sala de lo Penal) of the Audiencia Nacional overturned Pedraz's dismissal as "premature" and ordered the investigation reopened, siding with the Anti-Corruption Prosecutor's Office, which argued several aspects of the alleged scheme, said to involve a fraud of approximately $4.85 billion, remained unresolved.

=== Pacific Exploration & Production ===
In May 2015, O'Hara Administration, an international investment group led by Betancourt, became the largest shareholder of the Pacific Exploration & Production Corporation, a petroleum company by controlling 19.5 percent of its shares. By the end of August 2015 Betancourt increased his control over the shares of Pacific to 19.95% , was appointed director and member of the board.

In August 2016, O’Hara together with the Mexican investor Fernando Chico Pardo presented a restructuring bid for Pacific worth $575 million. Betancourt fought off potential shareholders in a bid "to gain control of the company themselves", though when a deal with Mexico's ALFA fell through, Betancourt and his group lost 70% of their investment.

=== BDK Financial Group ===
In June 2015 the BDK Financial Group, of which Alejandro Betancourt is a major shareholder, inaugurated the Banque de Dakar headquarters in Senegal. The objective of the financial group is to offer banking services in French-speaking Africa. In March 2016 the group appointed Alfredo Sáenz Abad as president of the bank.

=== Hawkers ===
In October 2017, Betancourt led a €50 million Series A funding round for the company, which was one of the largest financings in Spanish history at the time. Hawkers appointed Alejandro Betancourt as its new president one month later. By 2018, he began opening physical stores for the brand, resulting in 60 brick-and-mortar locations by 2025.

As of 2019 Betancourt was the largest shareholder of Hawkers. He has overseen the company’s plan for expansion and its adjustment to the recession in Spain.

=== Auro ===
As of 2022, Betancourt participated as a shareholder in the founding of Auro New Transport, a vehicle for hire company in Spain. In November 2022, Uber and Cabify placed competitive bids of around 200 million euros to buy the company.

=== North American Blue Energy Partners ===
Betancourt controls North American Blue Energy Partners (NABEP), which The Washington Post described in 2026 as the second-largest private oil company in Venezuela. The newspaper reported that NABEP had increased output from 18,000 barrels per day to nearly 200,000 barrels per day over the preceding two years, and that Betancourt had become a key intermediary between the United States and Venezuela, helping to broker early contracts to restart oil production in the country.

On 28 August 2026, President Donald Trump announced an agreement under which the United States would take a controlling stake in a joint venture holding long-term contracts over a share of Venezuela's oil reserves. According to The Washington Post, NABEP would be the principal private Venezuelan participant in the arrangement. The newspaper also reported that United States officials had lobbied during 2026 to resolve the Swiss money-laundering investigation into Betancourt in a way that would avoid criminal charges and end travel restrictions on him, that the United States had not acted on a Swiss warrant for his arrest, and that he had been permitted to enter the country repeatedly for meetings with the Trump administration. Betancourt has not been charged, and his attorney denied that he was involved in money laundering. The New York Times reported that NABEP is controlled by Betancourt's family, is registered in Barbados and produces around 200,000 barrels per day, and that it planned to take on up to $5 billion in debt to raise output to one million barrels per day within five years. The company's holdings originated in Petrozamora, a producer in mature fields in Lake Maracaibo in which Betancourt had acquired a stake, with further fields added later. Under the announced arrangement, the Office of Strategic Capital of the United States Department of War would support development of 17 oil fields and take a 35 per cent equity stake while NABEP led operations, and the State Department said the United States would purchase 20 per cent of the joint venture's output at production cost and maintain a right of first refusal to the remaining 80%; the United States would also hold the right to acquire shares in NABEP or a related entity through a warrant. The newspaper reported that State Department officials had during 2026 pressed the Swiss government over its investigations into Betancourt and asked the British government to lift travel restrictions on him, and that the department had issued him a multiple-entry visa. It reported that his personal bank accounts had been under investigation by prosecutors in Zurich for more than a decade without his being formally charged, and quoted Sara Chouraqui, NABEP's general counsel, as saying that Betancourt "has never been charged with a crime in any jurisdiction".

== Controversies ==
Betancourt, as recently as September 2026, has been the focus of money laundering and tax fraud investigations in Switzerland and Spain. In October 2026, shortly before her return to Venezuela from US exile, María Corina Machado had accused Betancourt of "obscene corruption", which Betancourt denied, insisting he had not been charged with any crimes.

== Personal life ==
In 2024, Alejandro Betancourt was appointed Knight of the Order del Camino de Santiago.
