= Electricity sector in Venezuela =

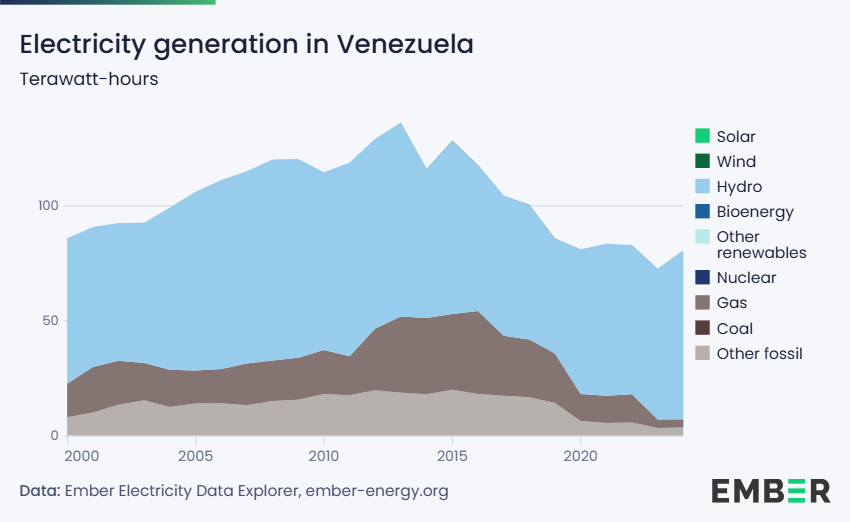
Electricity generation in Venezuela in terawatt-hours

The electricity sector in Venezuela is heavily dependent on hydroelectricity, with this energy source accounting for 64% of the country's electricity generation in 2021. The country relies on six hydroelectric plants, with Central Hidroeléctrica Guri providing the majority of this capacity. In 2021, natural gas and petroleum contributed 25% and 11% to electricity generation, respectively. Managed by CORPOELEC, the sector has declined due to outdated infrastructure and insufficient investment, reducing generation from 120 billion kWh in 2013 to 95 billion kWh in 2021. Despite a 99% electrification rate in 2019, frequent power outages have worsened, peaking with a nationwide blackout in 2019 and increasing by 22% from 2021 to 2022. Fuel shortages have also hampered power plant operations.

== History ==
Generation of electricity started end of the 19th century by the construction of small-scale hydroelectric power plants. In the first half of the 20th century, the electricity sector was in hands of private companies, which built local and regional supply schemes. The first high-voltage power line of 69 kV was built for the power supply of Caracas when the hydroelectric power plants of Curupao and Izcaragua went into service in 1932. In the late 1940s, a large thermal central was inaugurated in Tacoa. In 1948 and 1954, several companies formed the Cooperación Venezolana de Fomento (CVF) to connect the isolated regional and local power grids with a network of 115 kV power lines. Though political unrest and economic instability hampered the further development of electrification. The national grid was created in 1969.

== Electricity production ==
The electricity sector in Venezuela is heavily dependent on hydroelectricity, which accounted for 64% of the nation's electricity generation in 2021. Besides hydroelectric power, Venezuela also relies on natural gas and petroleum, contributing 25% and 11%, respectively, to the total electricity output that year. The country operates six hydroelectric plants, totaling a capacity of 16,010 megawatts (MW), with the Central Hidroeléctrica Guri in Orinoco being the most significant, accounting for 64% of Venezuela's hydroelectric capacity. This reliance on hydroelectricity highlights the grid's vulnerability to fluctuations in water availability.

From 1980 to 2000, Venezuela's electricity consumption almost tripled from about 30 to 88 terawatt hours (TWh), primarily met through hydroelectric expansion, while thermal capacity stayed flat. By 2002/03, electricity theft and drought-induced shortfalls led to a mid-2000s policy shift towards enhancing thermal plant capacity, which nearly doubled. Despite the regional trend towards solar and wind energy since 2015, Venezuela's efforts to establish wind energy, with a projected 50 MW capacity, failed to result in operational facilities.

In 2015, Venezuela produced 75 TWh of hydropower, which accounts 1.9% of world's total, a small increase over the production of 2004 of 70 TWh . The installed capacity had however in 2012 reached 26 GW from a total of 13.76 GW at the end of 2002, where 4.5 GW were under construction and 7.4 GW planned. The World Energy Council energy resource report of 2010 estimates the gross theoretical hydropower production could reach 731 TWh per annum, of which 100 TWh are economically exploitable, an increase over the 320 TWh estimates of 2004.

Electricity generation 2011-2021 (Terawatt-hours)
2011	2012	2013	2014	2015	2016	2017	2018	2019	2020	2021
122.9	127.9	132.6	130.9	125.3	114.7	110.3	95.4	80.1	74.5	76.7

Hydroelectricity production is concentrated on the Caroní River in Guayana Region. Today it has 4 different dams. The largest hydroplant is the Guri dam with 10,200 MW of installed capacity, which makes it the third-largest hydroelectric plant in the world. Other hydroelectric projects on the Caroní are Caruachi Dam, Macagua I, Macagua II and Macagua III, with a total of 15.910 MW of installed capacity in 2003. A new dams, Tocoma (2 160 MW) and Tayucay (2 450 MW), was under construction between Guri and Caruachi in 2003. With a projected installed capacity for the whole Hydroelectric Complex (upstream Caroni River and downstream Caroni River), between 17.250 and 20.000 MW were planned for 2010.

== Organizations ==
The largest power companies are state-owned CVG Electrificación del Caroní (EDELCA), a subsidiary of the mining company Corporación Venezolana de Guayana (CVG), and Compania Anonima de Administracion y Fomento Electrico (CADAFE) accounting respectively for approximately 63% and 18% of generating capacities. Other state-owned power companies are Energía Eléctrica de Barquisimeto (ENELBAR) and Energía Eléctrica de Venezuela (ENELVEN) and Energía Eléctrica de la Costa Oriental (ENELCO) or ENELVEN-ENELCO (approximately 8% of capacities). In 2007, PDVSA bought 82.14% percent of Electricidad de Caracas (EDC) from AES Corporation as part of a renationalization program. Subsequently, the ownership share rose to 93.62% (December 2008). EDC has 11% of Venezuelan capacity, and owns the majority of conventional thermal power plants. The rest of the power production is owned by private companies.

The national transmission system (Sistema Interconectado Nacional, SIN) is composed by four interconnected regional transmission systems operated by EDELCA, CADAFE, EDC and ENELVEN-ENELCO. Oficina de Operación del Sistema Interconectado (OPSIS), jointly owned by the four vertical integrated electric companies, operate the SIN under an RTPA regime.

== See also ==
- Energy crisis in Venezuela
- 2019 Venezuelan blackouts
