= Zulia energy collapse =

Energy collapse in the state of Zulia, Venezuela

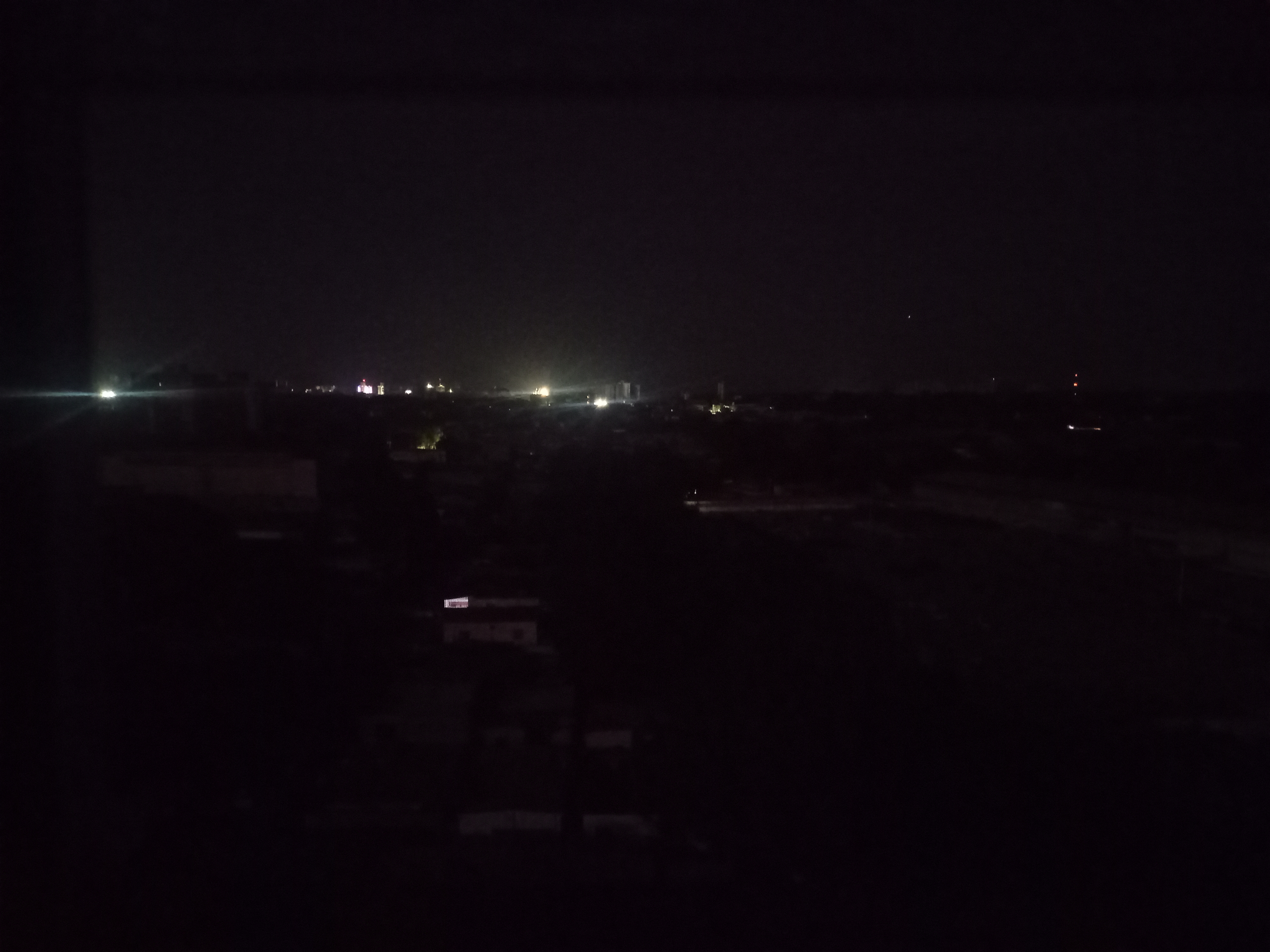
View of the city of Maracaibo without electricity service in the early morning hours of January 31, 2026.

An energy collapse in the state of Zulia, Venezuela occurred as a result of the country's ongoing general crisis, and it is the largest of its kind in the history of the state. With previous events in 2015 and 2016, the collapse intensified in 2017, when in September an alleged theft of cables left the city of Maracaibo (considered the second most important municipality in the country) and its surroundings without electricity. Since then long and short-term blackouts have been reported, which also cause the suspension of water supply, failures in cable television, telephone coverage and Internet access, among other services, as well as difficulty conducting business transactions, caused by the scarcity of banknotes and the dependence on the large-scale use of the point of sale terminals as well as electronic payments (such as wire transfers) that are deficient in the absence of electricity and the Internet, resulting in closing of establishments, absence of work, damage of food and electrical appliances, the decrease in quality of life, among other factors, which added to the high temperatures suffered by citizens, affect the normal development of the population. Authorities such as the national government and the government of Zulia (headed by governor Omar Prieto) have attributed these failures to an alleged sabotage, but the opposition and experts denounce that it is due to lack of maintenance, also arguing that only less than half of what is consumed regularly is produced, reason for which there is "cargo administration" (rationing). The National Assembly of Venezuela, of opposition majority, declared the region in a state of electrical emergency. The service has also been interrupted but to a lesser extent in other states such as Bolívar, Carabobo, Falcón, Mérida, Miranda, Nueva Esparta, Táchira, Vargas and the country's capital Caracas.

The Minister of Electric Power and president of the National Electric Corporation (Corpoelec) threatened with the maximum penalty (25 to 30 years in prison) those who commit acts of sabotage. On 28 September 2018, the minister announced the suspension of the rationing. However, power cuts in the year 2019 regained strength, again registering rationing in different areas of the entity.

== Blackouts ==
=== 2017 ===
According to the Association of Engineers of Zulia, there were 25 blackouts in two days in Zulia, between 17 and 18 October, because only 2,000 of the 3,000 megawatts needed to satisfy the electricity demand are produced, while an official of Corpoelec affirmed that the blackouts were due to the high temperatures, affecting several municipalities, including Maracaibo.

On 29 November, during the baseball game between the Navegantes del Magallanes and the Águilas del Zulia at the Estadio Luis Aparicio El Grande, the electricity went out from 7:45 p.m. until 9:15 p.m., due to an alleged sabotage.

On 24 December, there was a blackout that lasted approximately 21 hours, in response to this, the Bolivarian Intelligence Service (SEBIN) stated "they are sabotaging, maximum alert", also, several Twitter users said "Nochebuena en penumbra" ("Christmas Eve in twilight"), the blackout started at 5:00 p.m. approximately.

=== 2018 ===
On 11 January, the Llano Alto and Juan de Ávila sectors of Maracaibo were without electricity for 12 hours, and absence of telephone service was also reported.

On 15 January, a three-hour blackout occurred in the Raúl Leoni Parish of Maracaibo.

On 22 February, in the east of the city of Maracaibo and the eastern communities of Lake Maracaibo, there was no electricity service from 10 pm until 3 am, the affected sectors were Circunvalación 3, Sabaneta, Lago Azul, La Paragua, El Milagro, La Floresta, Veritas, and La Rotaria; also, there was the absence of electric service in La Cañada, San Francisco, Cabimas and Ciudad Ojeda.

Due to explosions in transformers, on 7 March a blackout occurred from 1 am. until 6:30 a.m. For twelve minutes there were several fluctuations.

On 18 April, a 12-hour blackout took place in 9 municipalities in the state of Zulia, including in the south of the state, in Moralito, 40 km from El Vigía, due to three destroyed substations, object of an alleged sabotage; the governor Omar Prieto affirmed that an "exhaustive investigation" would be carried out.

On 23 April, a second explosion of a substation left without electricity for 19 hours in several areas of Maracaibo.

For six hours, sectors of eastern Maracaibo were without electricity on 3 May; when electricity was restored, several slumps and failures occurred.

On 11 July, great part of the city of Maracaibo and its surroundings were left without electricity. The deposed governor-elect of the entity, Juan Pablo Guanipa, called the inhabitants to protest against said failure.

In August, the capital of the state of Zulia, Maracaibo, spent up to a week without electricity due to a fire that occurred in the warehouses of an electrical transmission wiring located in the General Rafael Urdaneta Bridge, the main communication channel in that region. After the restoration, rationing was applied for four hours a day.

On 31 August, at dawn, there was an explosion at the Las Tarabas substation that caused the suspension of service in the northern part of the city for more than 18 hours.

At the end of August, the government again denounced wire theft.

In September, the capital was again in the dark for more than two days after a reported failure in Sur del Lago de Maracaibo.

Although the governor of Zulia announced that the electric system was stabilized, multiple sectors of the entity were left without service on 29 September 2018.

On 24 October 2018, part of the state suffered a blackout that Corpoelec attributed to a fault in the Yaracuy-El Tablazo line, but citizens reported that the failure could be due to the explosion at the Punta Iguana electric substation in Santa Rita, located near the bridge over the lake, which had to be closed.

On 28 October another breakdown occurred, this time on the Arreaga Central line after the fall of a tree, according to authorities, which caused electrical failures in several sectors of Maracaibo.

On 23 December, the government reported that there was a new cutting of cables and damage to the towers of the Las Peonias substation, which according to the governor of the entity affected approximately 200MW of the electricity system, causing blackouts in various sectors.

=== 2020 ===
According to statements made in April by state Congresswoman Nora Bracho, 92% of residents in Zulia continue to suffer frequent power outages. The average duration of the outages is between 6 and 8 hours and only 6% receive water. According to the committee of those affected by blackouts in Venezuela, 32,000 power outages occurred in Zulia in 2020.

=== 2021 ===
In January, Zulia was the Venezuelan state with the highest number of power outages. At least 210 with almost 7 outages per day, according to Aixa López, female President of the Committee of Victims of Blackouts.

== Rationing ==
Until 23 September, the entity was under heavy rationing from the end of 2017 with regular hours of 4 to 6 hours a day, which according to circumstances could increase to 8, 10 and up to 12 hours divided into several rounds a day (early in the morning, morning, afternoon and/or evening). People from Zulia have repeatedly denounced that the schedules did not notify or respect them, as well as that the constant fluctuations could damage their electronic equipment. The Minister of Electric Energy, Luis Motta Domínguez, announced the suspension of the rationing on 23 September 2018, informing that the sublacustrine cable was reconnected and a turbo generator with 150 megawatts (MW) entered service for the Zulia state. Despite the announcements, blackouts have continued to occur, to which the authorities have responded that it is due to breakdowns.

== See also ==
- 2024 Venezuelan blackouts
- 2019 Venezuelan blackouts
- Energy crisis in Venezuela
