= Venezuelan crisis (disambiguation) =

Venezuelan crisis or Venezuela crisis may refer to:

- Venezuelan crisis of 1895, between Venezuela and the United Kingdom
- Venezuelan crisis of 1902–03, between Venezuela and Britain, Germany and Italy
- Dutch–Venezuelan crisis of 1908, between Venezuela and the Netherlands
- Venezuelan banking crisis of 1994
- Venezuelan refugee crisis (1999–present)
  - Venezuela–Colombia migrant crisis (2015)
- 2005 Mexico–Venezuela diplomatic crisis
- Venezuelan banking crisis of 2009–10
- 2010 Colombia–Venezuela diplomatic crisis
- Crisis in Venezuela (2010–present)
  - 2013–present economic crisis in Venezuela
  - Energy crisis in Venezuela
  - 2019 Venezuelan presidential crisis
- 2023 Guyana-Venezuela crisis
- 2024 Venezuelan political crisis
- 2026 United States strikes in Venezuela
