= Derwick Associates =

Venezuelan energy company

Derwick
- Native name: Derwick Associates de Venezuela SA
- Industry: Energy
- Founded: 2003
- Founder: Alejandro Betancourt López; Pedro Trebbau López
- Headquarters: Venezuela
- Products: Electrical power Natural gas
- Services: Engineering; Power-plant construction
- Website: derwickassociates.com

Derwick is a Venezuelan energy company specializing in the construction of turn-key power plant projects. According to The Wall Street Journal, Derwick Associates "was awarded hundreds of millions of dollars in contracts in little more than a year to build power plants in Venezuela shortly after the country's power grid began to sputter in 2009".

== History and clients ==
Derwick's first project was the Engineering Procurement and Construction (EPC) of Picure Power Plant in Vargas state for 156 MW, awarded by the state-owned Electricidad de Caracas in 2009. It was followed by 11 more contracts from the Venezuelan government through PDVSA, CVG and Corpoelec during the 2009–2010 energy crisis in Venezuela. Four contracts were awarded by state-owned Electricidad de Caracas (part of Corpoelec since 2007), five by state-owned Petróleos de Venezuela SA (PDVSA, with the contract negotiated by Bariven, a division of PDVSA), and one by state-owned Venezuelan Guayana Corporation (CVG). The company's directors are: Edgard Romero Lazo, Iker Candina, Alejandro Betancourt López and Pedro Trebbau López.

== Projects and actions ==
=== Venezuelan Engineering Procurement and Construction ===
- Picure (Completed).
- La Raisa I (Completed).
- La Raisa II (Completed).
- Guarenas I (Completed).
- Guarenas II (Completed).
- Adecuación Dual, Planta Juan Bautista Arismendi (Completed).
- Sidor Planta A (Completed).
- El Furrial (over 97% completion).
- Barinas (over 97% completion).
- Morichal (over 97% completion).

=== Turbine Technology Center (TTC) ===
Derwick´s Turbine Technology Center (TTC) was started by Derwick in 2011 and conceived as a quick response to the technical assistance needs of the country.

In December 2013, Derwick Associates received an award for "The Best Latin-American Initiative", given by Capital, a Spanish financial magazine. The award recognized the TTC as an important initiative that has helped to improve Venezuela's power system.

== Controversy and litigation ==
=== Independent investigations ===
In 2011, César Batiz of Venezuelan newspaper Ultimas Noticias published an investigative series alleging overbilling and odd transactions between BARIVEN and Derwick Associates. The articles alleged that the company had no experience building power plants when it was contracted to build them. A deputy to the National Assembly called for an investigation of how the Derwick contracts were awarded. Ultimas Noticias won an award for investigative journalism in 2012 for its investigation. According to Reporters Without Borders and to the Institute of Press and Society, reporters received "threats, pressures, bribe offers" or were banned on Venezuela's internet. In 2012, Batiz told IPYS he was offered a bribe to stop writing about the Venezuelan electricity industry.

According to claims by energy expert José Aguilar, the 40 contracts awarded to various companies, including Derwick, to address the Venezuelan energy crisis were overbilled by billions of dollars. Derwick director Edgard Romero Lazo claimed that allegations of overbilling and bribery were "part of a defamation campaign" against the company. The company claims that all contracts are available to the public through the National Contractors Registry (RNC).

=== Lawsuits ===
In 2013, Derwick was sued in the New York Federal Court by Washington businessman and ex-ambassador Otto Reich, who alleged that Derwick's executives defamed him and caused his consulting business to suffer financial losses, accusing Derwick of falsely stating that he consulted for them. In a separate legal action, Thor Leonardo Halvorssen Mendoza, a human rights lawyer, alleged defamation and sued Derwick and its partners.

Both suits have been dismissed.

=== US Department of Justice investigations ===
In August 2014, it was reported in The Wall Street Journal that Derwick was under preliminary investigations by the United States Department of Justice and Manhattan prosecutors due to bribery allegations and possible banking infractions. ProEnergy Services, an energy company based in Missouri, was also said to be under investigation due to its relationship with Derwick. Manhattan prosecutors were specifically investigating Derwick and ProEnergy Services due to potential violations of New York banking laws. Federal prosecutors are investigating the two companies for potential breaches of the Foreign Corrupt Practices Act, "which prohibits offering foreign government officials improper payments in exchange for a business advantage", with prosecutors suspicious of the potentially inflated prices used by Derwick and ProEnergy Services for the Venezuelan government that possibly showed raised prices to cover acts of bribery.

In March 2016, Derwick's activities were investigated by U.S. Attorney Preet Bharara in New York. Switzerland's Federal Office of Justice confirmed that 18 Swiss banks, following the measures of mutual assistance, agreed to turn over any existing bank records they would have involving representatives of the company, the first official statement acknowledging the investigation against Derwick by the United States Department of Justice. According to a Derwick spokesman, the investigation was suspended after the Justice Department reviewed its bank records, though the Department of Justice did not confirm this.

== 2019 Venezuelan power outages ==
When the largest blackout in Venezuela's history occurred in March 2019, The Wall Street Journal wrote that "Venezuela's power grid slowly has decayed over the past decade due to what economists and former officials say is mismanagement, corruption and Latin America's deepest economic crisis on record, leading the government to virtually abandon public investment." The article highlighted past Derwick contracts with state companies, saying "One company, Derwick Associates, formed by a number of well connected young businessmen with scant experience in the power business, received about $1.8 billion in contracts from Venezuelan state companies to buy and install turbines, paying a U.S. company about $1 billion to do the work." Derwick denies that any bribes were taken, saying the prices reflect the costs in Venezuela.
