= Things Are Never So Bad That They Can't Get Worse =

2022 book by William Neuman

- Author: William Neuman
- Language: English
- Genre: Politics, non-fiction
- Publisher: St. Martin's Press
- Publication date: March 15, 2022
- Publication place: United States
- Media type: Hardcover
- Pages: 337
- ISBN: 9781250266163
- Dewey Decimal: 987.06/42
- LC Class: F2329 .N48 2022

Things Are Never So Bad That They Can't Get Worse: Inside the Collapse of Venezuela was written by William Neuman, a correspondent of The New York Times. The book chronicles Neuman's experiences and reporting from his time spent in Venezuela between 2012 and 2019, with a particular focus on the 2019 Venezuelan blackouts.

== Background and development ==
New York Times correspondent William Neuman first arrived in Venezuela in 2012 and observed the unfolding crisis in Venezuela until his departure in 2016. He returned to Venezuela in 2019 to cover the Venezuelan presidential crisis and experienced the 2019 Venezuelan blackouts.

The title of the book came from a conversation Neuman had with a Venezuelan who opined that things could still get worse after having seen her country deteriorate.

== Structure ==
The book is structured in three parts; the history of Venezuela and rise of Hugo Chávez, the presidency of Nicolás Maduro and finally the efforts of Juan Guaidó and the United States during the Venezuelan presidential crisis.

The first part discusses Chávez's populism and the context with which it applied within the history and economy of Venezuela. Neuman writes on the history of the Venezuelan oil industry and how in the 1970s during the period following the Puntofijo Pact, a state of clientelism existed in Venezuela with an economy and political order centered on oil. The section then details that after Chávez was elected, oil sales during the 2000s commodities boom were nearly twice as large as during the 1970s commodities boom, with Chávez using his celebrity-like status to enact empty socialist policies, which Neuman describes as "showcialismo".

Part two covers Maduro's early presidency, his response by cracking down on dissent and the economic failures at the time. It argues that the blackouts in 2019 were the culmination of the systemic mismanagement of Venezuela. The second part provides the account of an attorney saying that he nearly died while being tortured by the Special Action Forces.

The third part details the efforts of the United States and its policymakers to assist Guaidó with his effort to lead Venezuela, interviewing American and Venezuelan opposition officials. Neuman writes that in their effort to overthrow Maduro, the United States conspired with opposition politicians to promote Guaidó's ascension to the disputed presidency, that many of their actions were improvised and how futile the opposition was, resulting with Maduro maintaining power.

== Reception ==
Newsweek listed the book among "22 Books to Look Forward to in 2022", stating that "Neuman draws on profound interviews he conducted and his deep knowledge of the country and its history to starkly detail how the country got to where it is today."

Tim Padgett's review in The New York Times says that "Neuman skillfully explains" the issues, describing the book as "richly reported"; Publishers Weekly agreed it was "deeply reported" and Richard Feinberg describes it in Foreign Affairs as a "well-sourced account". Writing in India's The Week, R. Viswanathan says "Neuman has given a full account of the omissions and commissions of [Hugo] Chavez, he has ignored the fact that Chavez was a creation of his predecessors and opposition leaders." Scott B. MacDonald reviewed the book for Global Americans, stating that it "provides one of the more comprehensive profiles of Nicolás Maduro, who succeeded Hugo Chávez and remains in power", and explaining how Maduro was chosen. MacDonald identifies what he calls a "few weaknesses" in the coverage: "the Cuban, Chinese and Russian roles in Venezuela's decline are limited to near-cameo appearances (despite the billions of dollars the two extra-regional actors pumped into the country and Havana's security role)" and "the criminal activities of the Venezuelan elite (including the military) are at times glossed over".

On the tone of the book and subject matter, Michael Rodriguez wrote in the Library Journal that Neuman's accounts were a "riveting personal exploration". Viswanathan states that "Neuman has given names and faces to the victims of the Chavista misrule and mismanagement." Kirkus Reviews characterized the tome as "heartbreaking yet authoritative", and Publishers Weekly likewise described some of the material as "heartbreaking". Feinberg opined that the book was an "unrelentingly depressing requiem", and that it contains individuals caught "in a polarized polity rife with vitriol, paranoia, and conspiracy theories".

Reviewers commented on Neuman's coverage of the trajectory of Venezuelan history. In his review for ReVista, Harvard Review of Latin America, Gabriel Hetland wrote that he initially had "low expectations" for the book "precisely because of Neuman's affiliation with the Times" saying that the newspaper focused on the shortcomings of the Venezuelan government instead of its achievements, though said that the book, to his "pleasant surprise", focused on "how government policies under Chávez, and to a much lesser degree Maduro, benefited Venezuela's poor." Kirkus Reviews describes the book as a "necessary look at a ruined nation", and Rodriguez mentions the coverage of "Venezuela's slow-moving collapse". Publishers Weekly characterizes it as an "account of the ongoing crisis in Venezuela" that depicts "the country's downward spiral since 2014–driven by a collapse in oil prices, U.S. sanctions, and hyperinflation—from the perspectives of political leaders and ordinary citizens." Padgett praises the description of the "insane economic malpractice and malfeasance" in Venezuela, as "a thorough and important history" on the Dutch disease Venezuela experienced since it discovered oil through the nation's more contemporary history with the Bolivarian Revolution. MacDonald describes the book as a "welcome addition to the chronicles of Venezuela's Chavista experiment", comparing it to Crude Nation: How Oil Riches Ruined Venezuela written in 2016 by Raul Gellegos about the "economic mismanagement" of Venezuela's oil resources.

Commenting on Neuman's coverage of the administrations of Juan Guaidó and Donald Trump, Viswanathan writes that "Neuman gives new details on the self-proclamation of Juan Guaido as interim president and Guaido's involvement in the attempt to invade Venezuela from the sea with a bunch of mercenaries in 2019", noting Neuman's ability to speak to American and Venezuelan officials about the May 2020 Venezuelan Operation Gideon. Feinberg states that "U.S. politicians come off poorly" in the book, writing that "Neuman reveals a Trump administration shockingly ill informed and reckless, its disastrous improvisations writing a distressingly dark chapter in inter-American relations." MacDonald finds the coverage of this aspect lacking, writing that "Neuman portrays the U.S. role as negative, without much discussion beyond the ham-fisted nature of the Trump administration." Hetland says that "Neuman's analysis of Juan Guaidó's rise and fall is invaluable. Neuman leaves no doubt that Guaidó was more a product of the Trump administration than of Venezuela's opposition" and concludes that "Neuman has done some fine reporting and he shows courage in directing his attention towards the profoundly foolish and damaging actions of Guaidó and the U.S. government."

== Television adaptation ==
Sunset Lane Media optioned the book in September 2022 after producer Kip Azzoni approached CEO and founder of Sunset David Beaubaire to create the project. Neuman stated "I'm excited to work with David and Kip on a project that will shine a light on the tragic crisis in Venezuela and the suffering of ordinary people there. ... Venezuela is a cautionary tale for showing how extreme political polarization can be used to gain and hold onto power, while tearing down the institutions that make democracy work."
