= ProEnergy Services =

American energy company

ProEnergy Services is an American, Missouri-based energy company that provides third party services for energy and manufacturing firms, including construction, management, operations, maintenance, and repair services for energy generation facilities, and equipment in several industries. ProEnergy offers over 200 energy and industrial related services with clients in forty nations around the world, including Argentina, Venezuela, Brazil, Panama, Pakistan and Angola.

== History ==
ProEnergy was founded in 2002 and currently employs about a thousand employees in its three US locations: Sedalia, Missouri, Houston, Texas, and Fort Collins, Colorado. In addition it has numerous employees in its international locations, including Venezuela, Argentina, Panama, Pakistan, Brazil, Angola, and Canada.

== Investigation ==
ProEnergy was under investigation by the US Department of Justice and Manhattan District authorities for its involvement in developing plants with Derwick Associates in Venezuela. The investigations were probing for possible violations of New York banking laws and possible violations of the Foreign Corrupt Practices Act. Cryptome published 14,000 internal documents from ProEnergy Services in response to the investigation. ProEnergy has never been formally charged but the investigation has never been closed.
