= Hawkers (company) =

Spanish brand that sells sunglasses

- Industry: Retail, Online shopping
- Founded: December 2013; 11 years ago, in Elche, Valencian Community, Spain
- Founders: Iñaki Soriano; Pablo Sánchez; Alejandro Moreno; David Moreno
- Area served: Worldwide
- Key people: Alejandro Betancourt (President); Hugo Arévalo (Vice president)
- Products: Sunglasses
- Revenue: 40 million euros in 2015
- Website: www.hawkersco.com

Hawkers is a Spanish brand based in Elche that sells sunglasses using the Internet as its distribution channel. Hawkers was founded in December 2013 by Iñaki Soriano, Pablo Sánchez and the brothers Alejandro and David Moreno. Hawkers is part of the Saldum Ventures group and its current President is Alejandro Betancourt.

== History ==
Hawkers was founded in December 2013 by Iñaki Soriano, Pablo Sánchez, Alejandro Moreno, and David Moreno; each had experience in a different area: programming, graphic design and business. These four had previously created Saldum, an online second hand webstore, in 2012. That project did not receive any external financing, and after a year and a half low sales forced them to find other sources of income. To raise money they started developing online stores for external clients. Noticing the platforms they developed for their clients were profitable, they decided to start their own online business. They started selling sunglasses of the American brand Knockaround with an initial investment of only $300. They followed that with the espadrilles brand, Miss Hamptons. The success of these two products led them to create their own sunglasses brand, and outsource its manufacturing.

In 2014 the company's revenue exceeded 15 million euros, increasing to 40 million the following year, and in 2016 Hawkers projected 70 million euros in sales.

In October 2016, Hawkers opened its first financing round to external investors, raising 50 million euros (56 million dollars) in its first round. In November the company announced the appointment of Alejandro Betancourt as Hawker's new president substituting the previous president Alejandro Moreno and that Hugo Arevalo joined as member of the board and vice president.

== Product ==
Hawkers models are based on other more well-known brands with expired licenses, such as Oakley and Ray-Ban sunglasses, with a variety of lens and frame combinations. The company has collaborated to produce specific styles of sunglasses with a number of notable brands and individuals, including the Los Angeles Lakers, Mercedes-Benz, Usher, Lewis Hamilton, and others.

The majority of the company's sales are direct-to-consumer sales conducted through the company's website. The sunglasses are produced by manufacturers in China, Italy, and Spain.

== Business model ==
According to Bloomberg Hawkers business is based on using the Internet and social media, specially Facebook and Twitter, as the main channel to grow its sales, following a strategy of marketing through influencers, celebrities and sponsorings.
