= Ricardo Zuloaga =

Venezuelan engineer, businessman and philanthropist

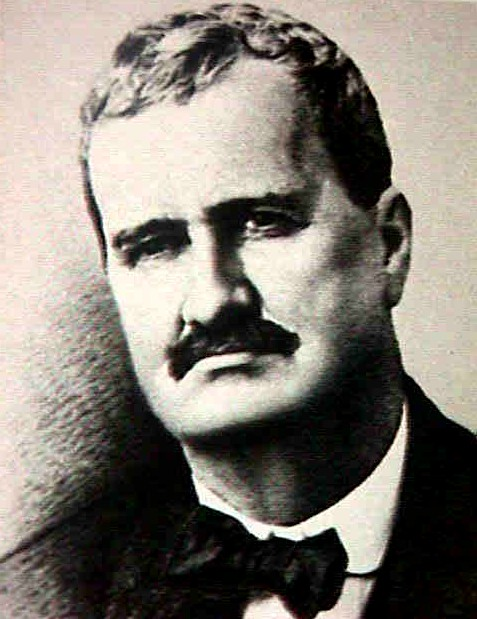
- Born: September 22, 1867; Caracas, Bolívar State (1864-1881), Venezuela
- Died: December 15, 1932 (aged 65); Caracas, Federal District, Venezuela
- Education: Central University of Venezuela
- Occupations: Businessman and Engineer
- Parent(s): Nicomedes Zuloaga Aguirre; Anita Tovar y Tovar

Ricardo Zuloaga (1867-1932) was a Venezuelan engineer, businessman and philanthropist.

== Early life ==
Zuloaga was born on September 22, 1867, in Caracas, Venezuela. He graduated from the Central University of Venezuela, where he studied engineering.

== Career ==
Zuloaga was the founder and CEO of Electricidad de Caracas.

== Death ==
Zuloaga died on December 15, 1932, in Caracas, Venezuela.
