= Luis Motta Domínguez =

Venezuelan politician

Luis Motta Dominguez
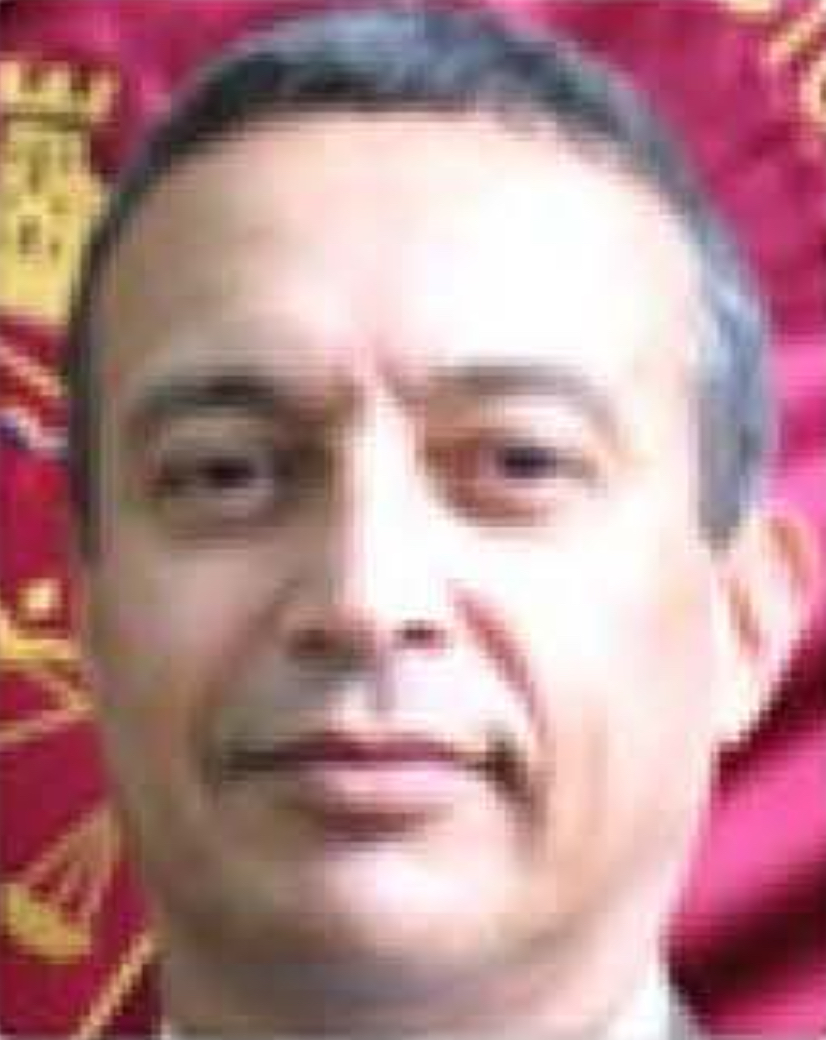

Minister of Popular Power for Electric Power
- In office 20 August 2015 – 1 April 2019
- President: Nicolás Maduro
- Preceded by: Jesse Chacón
- Succeeded by: Igor Gavidia

Personal details
- Born: Luis Alfredo Motta Dominguez; 2 July 1952 (age 73) Venezuela

Luis Alfredo Motta Dominguez (born July 2, 1958) is a Venezuelan politician and military officer who has previously served as a Minister of Electric Power during the 2015–2019 period and as president of the National Electricity Corporation (Corpoelec).

He was dismissed by President Nicolás Maduro in April 2019, following a series of blackouts that occurred in March.

== Sanctions ==
In November 2017, Canada sanctioned Domínguez and other Venezuelan officials under the Justice for Victims of Corrupt Foreign Officials Act, stating: "These individuals are responsible for, or complicit in, gross violations of internationally recognized human rights, have committed acts of significant corruption, or both."

The United States sanctioned Domínguez on 27 June 2019 for engaging in significant corruption and fraud to the detriment of the people of Venezuela. The Miami US attorney's office said during a news release that the Motta is indicted on seven counts of money laundering and one count of money laundering conspiracy, after awarding US$60 million in contracts to three Florida-based companies in return for bribes.

On 30 September 2020, the Drug Enforcement Administration (DEA) published a poster on its Twitter account offering up to US$5 million for information that could lead to the capture of Motta Domínguez.
