= Corpozulia =

- Type: State-owned enterprise (Public)
- Founded: 1969
- Headquarters: Zulia State, Venezuela
- Revenue: ▲ Bs. ? billion (2006) ▲$ ? billion (2006)
- Operating income: ▲ Bs. ? billion (2006) ▲$ ? billion (2006)
- Net income: ▲ Bs. ? billion (2006) ▲$ ? billion (2006)
- Parent: Venezuelan government Zulia State government
- Website: Corpozulia Website (in Spanish)

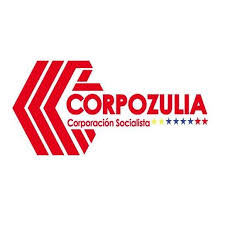

Corpozulia is a Venezuelan government organization that works in the area of economic development in Zulia State. Its mission is to make Zulia one of the economically strongest states of Venezuela. It also contributes to cultural development.
