= Lake Guri =

Lake Guri may refer to:

- Lake Guri in Madang Province of Papua New Guinea
- Lake created by Guri Dam on the Caroni River in Venezuela
