= Freddy Ñáñez =

Venezuelan politician

Freddy Alfred Nazareth Ñáñez Contreras (born April 15, 1976) is a Venezuelan politician, singer and poet. He currently serves as the Minister for Communication and Information in the Government of Venezuela. He was appointed Minister on 4 September 2020, by President Nicolás Maduro. He has also been president of Venezolana de Televisión (Venezuela's state television channel) and served as Minister of Culture from 2016 to 2017.

== Biography ==
Ñáñez was born in the Petare, Miranda. He was one of the founders of the Punk Rock group from Tachi "Los Residuos". He came into the political scene in 2010 as president of the Foundation for Culture and the Arts (Fundarte). During his tenure, he founded the Stefanía Mosca Literature Prize, the Caracas Book Fair and other large-scale Festivals such as El Suena Caracas, he also reissued the International Theatre Festival. On January 6, 2016, he was designated by President Nicolás Maduro as the new Minister for Culture of Venezuela. Under his watch as minister, the Venezuelan system of museums was entirely dismantled and sacked, only to be partially restored recently.

In November 2017, he was appointed as president of Venezolana de Televisión.
