= Roberto Marrero =

Venezuelan attorney and political figure

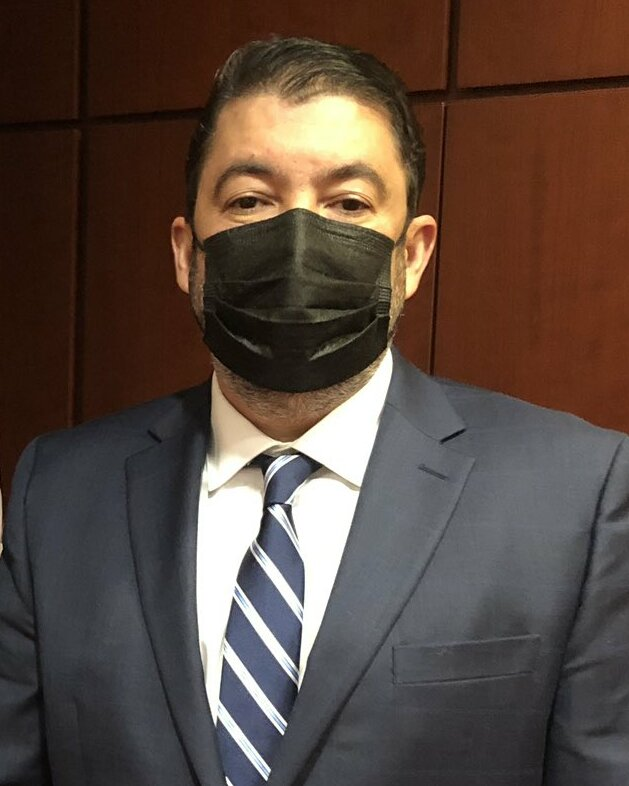
Roberto Marrero in 2020.

Roberto Eugenio Marrero Borjas is a Venezuelan attorney, politician, and chief of staff to Juan Guaidó; he was arrested by SEBIN during a raid on his home in the early morning hours of 21 March 2019, and detained in El Helicoide, a prison run by SEBIN and "considered the country's largest torture center" according to Clarín. Marrero is also an attorney for Leopoldo López; López is Guaidó's mentor and a political prisoner.

Néstor Reverol, Interior Minister, said Marrero was part of a "terrorist cell" that was planning to attack government officials. On 28 March, a judge ruled that Marrero would remain in prison while evidence is gathered; the prosecutor has 45 days to present evidence. He was charged with "conspiracy, money laundering, association to commit a crime and concealment of weapons and explosives".

During the 2019 Venezuelan presidential crisis, the US had repeatedly warned Nicolás Maduro not to go after Guaidó; Haaretz reported that the arrest of Guaidó's number-two person was a test of the US.

== Personal life ==
Roberto Eugenio Marrero Borjas founded the Human Rights Chair at Santa Maria University. He was a councilor for the Baruta Municipality. As of March 2019, he was 49 years old.

== Political career ==
When Carlos Vecchio was prohibited from running in the 2015 Venezuelan parliamentary elections, the Democratic Unity Roundtable (Spanish: Mesa de la Unidad Democrática, MUD) solicited the National Electoral Council to accept Marrero as the candidate for Monagas state. Representing the Popular Will (Spanish: Voluntad Popular) political party, Marrero served as secretary in 2016 for the Venezuelan National Assembly.

According to El Tiempo, Marrero has been working for "years behind the big names of the Venezuelan party Popular Will (VP), outlawed and fiercely persecuted by the regime of Nicolás Maduro." A personal friend of the founder of the Popular Will party, political prisoner Leopoldo López, Marrero was a member of the party's leadership. El Tiempo says he "is considered, by his party colleagues, as one of its main political operators, one of the channels of information closest to Lopez and appointed by him to be a right-hand man, caretaker and advisor to ... Juan Guaidó".

== Arrest and detention ==
External audio
- Marrero audio message during his arrest, from El País, retrieved on 22 March 2019

In the early morning of 21 March 2019, SEBIN officials first broke into the home of Marrero's neighbor, National Assembly deputy Sergio Vergara. Vergara tweeted that there were at least 40 SEBIN officials with long arms in 12 vehicles; The Wall Street Journal reports 15 SEBIN officials. They had Vergara on the floor, asking him where Marrero lived, a question he says he did not answer. Vergara reported that the agent's faces were covered; they held him for several hours although he informed them that he had parliamentary immunity. Vergara said he heard the officials breaking into Marrero's apartment next door. After about three hours between both apartments, the officials took Marrero and Vergara's driver, Luis Alberto Páez Salazar. Vergara says that as he was being taken away, Marrero shouted to him that the officials had planted a grenade and two rifles.

Marrero was able to send an audio message before he was taken away, saying:

"They are in my house right now. SEBIN is here. Unfortunately they came for me. Continue the fight, do not stop, take care of the president (Juan Guaidó) and let it be what God wants. God bless you. Strength and faith. The people should not stop because of this. Let us understand that the one who gets tired, loses."

Translation:

"En estos momentos están en mi casa. El Sebin está aquí. Lamentablemente llegaron a mí. Sigan la lucha, no se detengan, cuiden al presidente (Juan Guaidó) y que sea lo que Dios quiera. Dios los bendiga. Fuerza y fe. El pueblo no debe detenerse por esto. Demos a entender que el que se cansa pierde."

Marrero was accused of involvement in the 2019 blackout and terrorism. Guaidó said on 21 March that Marrero's whereabouts were not known. The Guardian says Marrero was taken to El Helicoide; Joel Garcia, Marrero's attorney, said that although he had not been able to see Marrero, he was certain that Marrero was at El Helicoide.

El Tiempo said that, because of his closeness to both Guaidó and López, there was concern for Marrero's life; opposition politician Fernando Albán Salazar died after being detained by SEBIN in what his party says was a result of torture, while officials labeled it a suicide. Opposition lawmakers were concerned he would be given psychotropic substances to induce false testimony.

By noon on 22 March, there had been no contact with Marrero, and lawmakers who went to El Helicoide were denied access. In the evening of 22 March, attorneys were able to see Marrero and Paez when they were taken to court for a hearing; they both appeared well "psychically and physically".

Manuel Cristopher Figuera, former director of the Bolivarian National Intelligence Service (SEBIN) who defected to the US after the failed 2019 Venezuelan uprising, told the Associated Press in July 2019 that, before focusing on Marrero, Maduro had targeted Guaidó's mother; Figuera says that because Guaidó's mother had cancer, they opted instead to accuse Maduro. Figuera said that Maduro told him, "Plant some weapons on him. Do what you have to do"; "And that's what we did", said Figuera.

=== Charges ===
Jorge Rodríguez, Maduro's Communications Minister, alleged on state television that "Marrero was the ringleader of a plot to bring hitmen from Central America to Venezuela to carry out assassinations". Rodríguez alleged that Leopoldo López was the head of the "terrorist organization" that included Marrero, Vergara and Freddy Guevara, Carlos Vecchio, Freddy Superlano and two other unnamed persons. As evidence, he offered screen shots from Marrero's cell phone, which Rodríguez claims show that Marrero was arranging payment for these hitmen. Maduro alleged that phone conversations about attempts to assassinate him had been recorded; the opposition denies these allegations.

Several days later, attorney Juan Planchart Márquez, Guaidó's cousin, was arrested and was being held at SEBIN headquarters; Rodríguez claimed Planchart was the "financial operator" of the network that allegedly plotted to assassinate Maduro.

On 28 March, a judge ruled that Marrero would remain in prison while evidence is gathered; the prosecutor has 45 days to present evidence. He was charged with "conspiracy, money laundering, association to commit a crime and concealment of weapons and explosives".

Marrero's brother said Marrero would be held at El Helicoide. Páez was released on the condition that he is prohibited from leaving the country and must present regularly before the court. Planchart was also to remain in prison.

=== Reactions ===
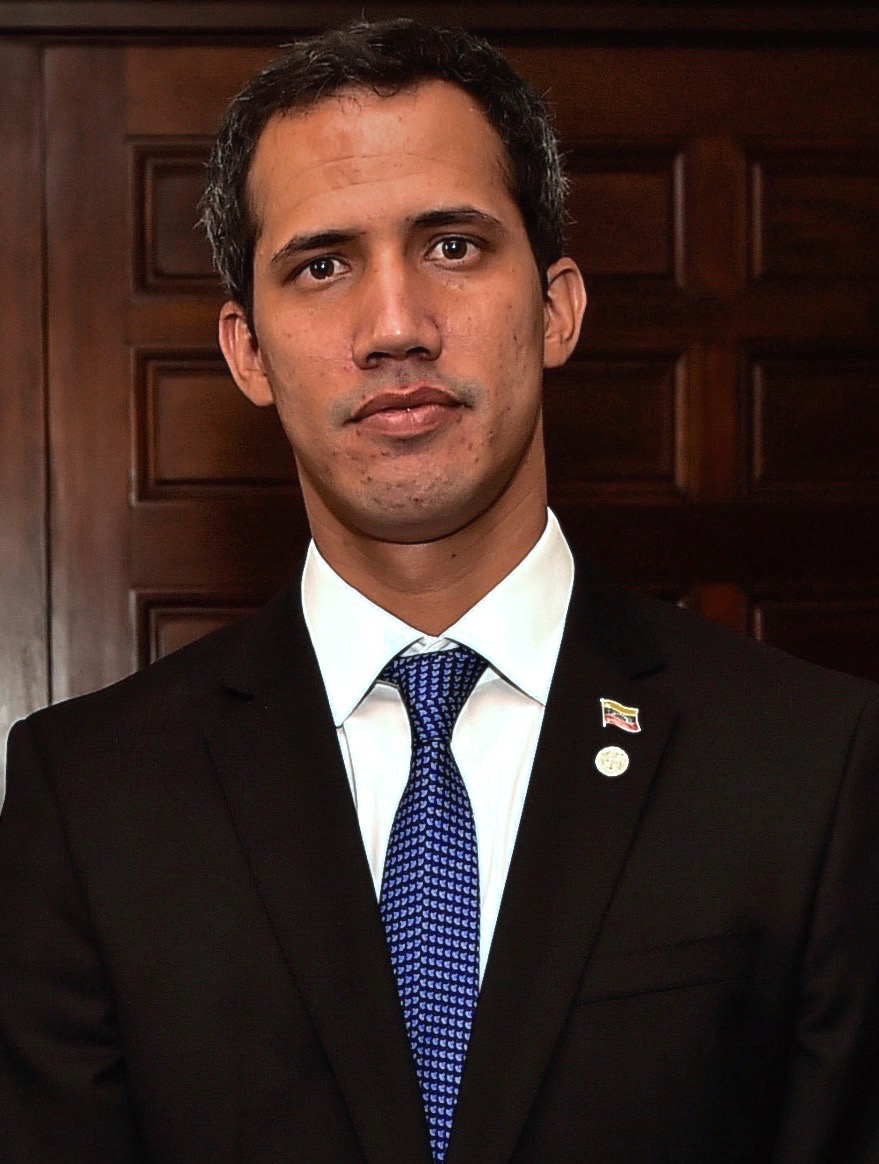
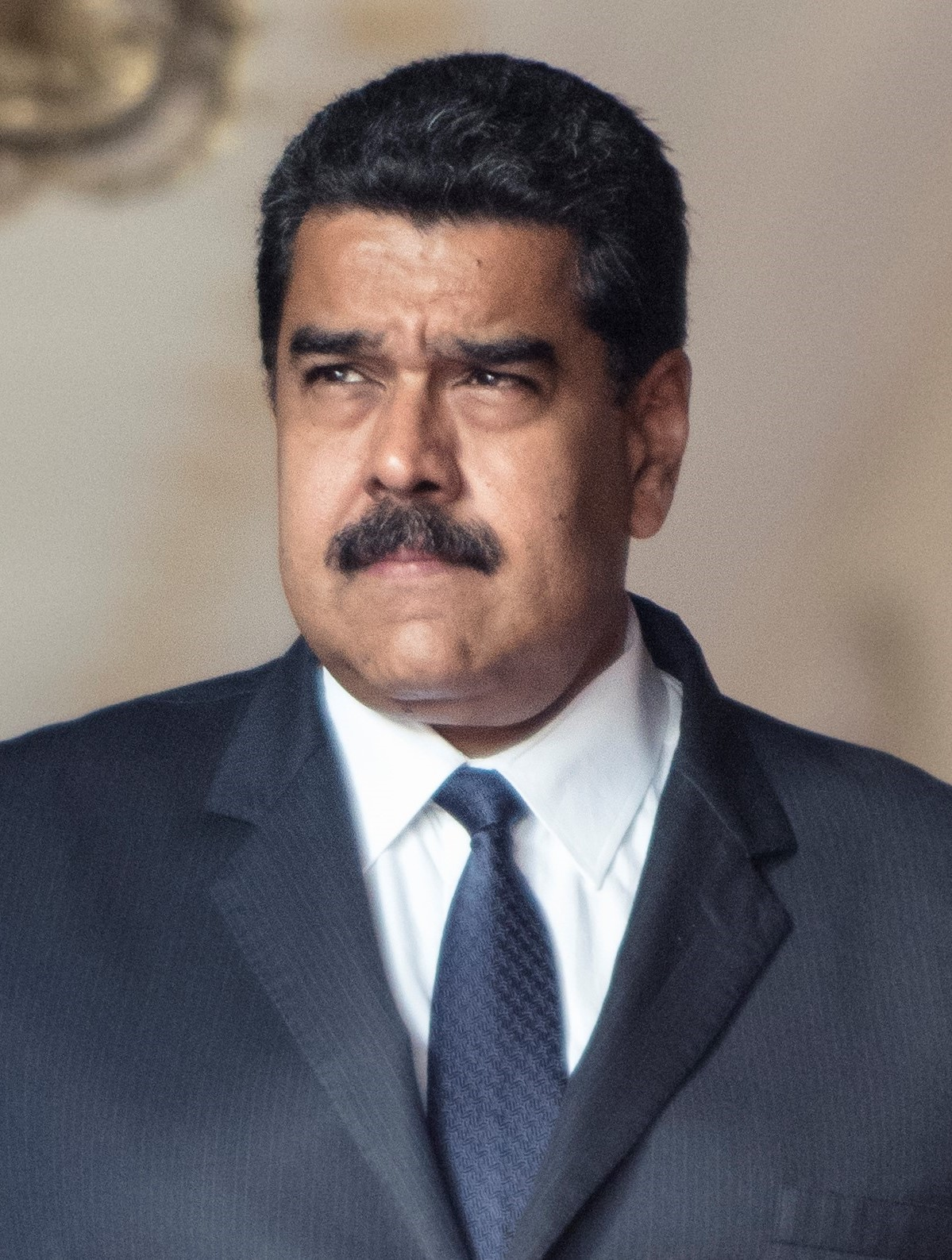
Juan Guaidó and Nicolás Maduro

Guaidó called it a "vile and vulgar kidnapping", adding "Either Nicolas Maduro doesn't dare to arrest me, or he's not the one giving orders." According to The Wall Street Journal, Guaidó said he had received calls from security force officials disclaiming any involvement in the arrest; he replied that they need say no more, per the 2019 Venezuelan Amnesty Law; he said the "incident was indicative of divides within the Maduro regime".

Hugo Carvajal, the head of Venezuela's military intelligence for ten years during Hugo Chávez's presidency and "one of the government's most prominent figures", said that Maduro had two objectives with the "political kidnapping": 1) to "test the international threats against the dictatorship", and 2) to create a distraction to cover the recent revelations from Ronald Dugarte. Dugarte was formerly with Venezuela's military counterintelligence, and told the Organization of American States (OAS) that political prisoners – both civilians and members of the armed forces – are tortured, and that intelligence work is directed by Cubans in Venezuela.

US special envoy for Venezuela Elliott Abrams said there will be consequences for the five individuals involved in Marrero's arrest. (Note: The BBC names them as Carol Padilla, prosecutors Farid Mora Salcedo and Dinora Bustamante, and SEBIN officials Dani Contreras and Ángel Flores. El Universal names the same people as Carol Padilla, Farik Mora and Dinorah Bustamante.) US Secretary of State Pompeo tweeted that the US "will hold accountable those involved". US Senator Marco Rubio said that Maduro's forces were testing the international response, "to calculate how & when to arrest Guaido". US national security advisor John Bolton stated that "Maduro has made another big mistake" that "will not go unanswered". The United States Department of State issued a statement in April 2019 highlighting Marrero's case as an example of the Maduro administration human rights abuses, alleging that "SEBIN has a record of using cruel and inhumane treatment to coerce confessions".

After the arrest of several people around Guaidó, OAS Secretary-General Luis Almagro described it as a "totalitarian attack" and called for "more forceful actions" from other countries. The Lima Group – including Argentina, Brazil and Canada – condemned the arrest. Paraguay's Chancellery tweeted that it condemned the illegal detention and demanded an end to human rights violations in Venezuela. Juan Carlos Varela, President of Panama, said the country would take concrete measures against Maduro's regime if Marrero is not released. Iván Duque Márquez, Colombia's President, called the incident a "vile aggression" and said the international community should "condemn the criminal persecution of the dictatorship". Costa Rica and Peru also condemned the act. Canada's Chrystia Freeland said Marrero had been "illegally detained by the Maduro regime. Intimidation and fear will not stop the return of democracy to #Venezuela. Those responsible must be held accountable."

Michelle Bachelet, chief of the Office of the United Nations High Commissioner for Human Rights (OHCHR), called on Maduro to reveal Marrero's location. Venezuela's bishops condemned the arrest.

The European Union called for the immediate and unconditional release of Marrero. France insisted that the repression against opposition members has to stop. Germany expressed repudiation for the arbitrary detention, saying it only intensified the conflict, and asked for guarantees of Marrero's safety.

Reuters described the arrest and detention as part of "an escalating crackdown by President Nicolas Maduro against his opponents". USA Today described it as a kidnapping. The New York Times said the arrest resulted in a "significant escalation of the country's political crisis". Bloomberg said Maduro was pressuring Guaidó, and "testing the commitment of foreign governments to protecting him".

Luis Salamanca, a Central University of Venezuela political scientist told The New York Times that Maduro was "raising the government's bargaining power in any future negotiations over the transfer of power ... but at the same time they are preparing escape routes if their ability to govern deteriorates further." A risk consultant for London's IHS Markit, Diego Moya-Ocampos, said to Bloomberg that "the regime is testing the international community and its repeated warnings against laying a hand on Maduro's rival [Guaidó] ... if they can't touch him, they'll go after those close to him." Nicholas Watson of Teneo Intelligence told The Wall Street Journal that "Marrero's arrest looks like a desperate attempt to break Guaidó's momentum .. The weakness in the regime's position is visible in the fact that arresting Guaidó himself would be seen as a step too far." Phil Gunson, analyst at the think tank International Crisis Group, said: "Maduro is essentially calling Trump's bluff ... [he has] concluded that the military option is a very remote possibility. If he doesn't see a meaningful response, he would be tempted to take the next step and jail Mr. Guaidó himself."

An April survey of 1,000 voters by Hercon Consultores found that 71% of Venezuelans surveyed disagreed with Marrero's detention.

=== Banking sanctions ===
Just hours after Marrero's detention, the United States Department of the Treasury responded on 22 March 2019 by placing sanctions on BANDES, the Venezuelan Economic and Social Development Bank (Spanish: Banco de Desarrollo Económico y Social de Venezuela) and four of its subsidiaries, that are based in Venezuela, Uruguay and Bolivia. The sanctioned subsidiaries are Banco Bandes Uruguay, Banco Bicentenario del Pueblos, Banco Universal SA Banco de Venezuela, and Banco Prodem SA, of Bolivia. The sanctions mean that "all property and interests in property of these entities, and of any entities that are owned, directly or indirectly, 50 percent or more by this entity, that are in the United States or in the possession or control of U.S. persons are blocked" and they "prohibit all dealings by U.S. persons or within (or transiting) the United States that involve any property or interests in property of blocked or designated persons."

US National Security Advisor John Bolton tweeted, "BANDES bank is to Venezuela's financial sector what PDVSA is to its oil sector. This action will severely affect any attempted currency movements by Maduro and his cronies moving forward." Bolton told Univision the sanctions were a direct response to Marrero's arrest, and that "Our aim is to bring this crisis to a conclusion quickly for the benefit of the Venezuelan people to get the Maduro regime to peacefully transition to the Guaido regime so that we can have free and fair elections." Univision said this action "put 'the entire banking sector' on notice" that "persons operating in Venezuela's financial sector may be subject to sanctions."

Treasury Secretary Steven Mnuchin said, "The willingness of Maduro's inner-circle to exploit Venezuela's institutions knows no bounds. Regime insiders have transformed BANDES and its subsidiaries into vehicles to move funds abroad in an attempt to prop up Maduro. Maduro and his enablers have distorted the original purpose of the bank, which was founded to help the economic and social well-being of the Venezuelan people, as part of a desperate attempt to hold onto power." Mnuchin warned, "The regime's continued use of kidnapping, torture, and murder of Venezuelan citizens will not be tolerated by the U.S. or the international coalition that is united behind President Guaido. Roberto Marrero and other political prisoners must be released immediately."

=== Release ===
Maduro pardoned 110 individuals who opposed his administration on 31 August 2020, including mostly politicians from the Venezuelan opposition along with union leaders, journalists, and others. Some of those individuals rejected the "pardon", on the grounds that they had committed no crime, and "that the decree excludes military and police officers, some of whom have been in prison for more than a decade on charges of rebellion and treason, which their lawyers and relatives deny", according to Reuters.

After one-and-half years in El Helicoide, Marrero was released as part of the pardon.

== See also ==
- Detention of Juan Requesens
- Detention of Maria Lourdes Afiuni
- Political prisoners in Venezuela
