= 2019 Venezuelan blackouts =

Nationwide power outages

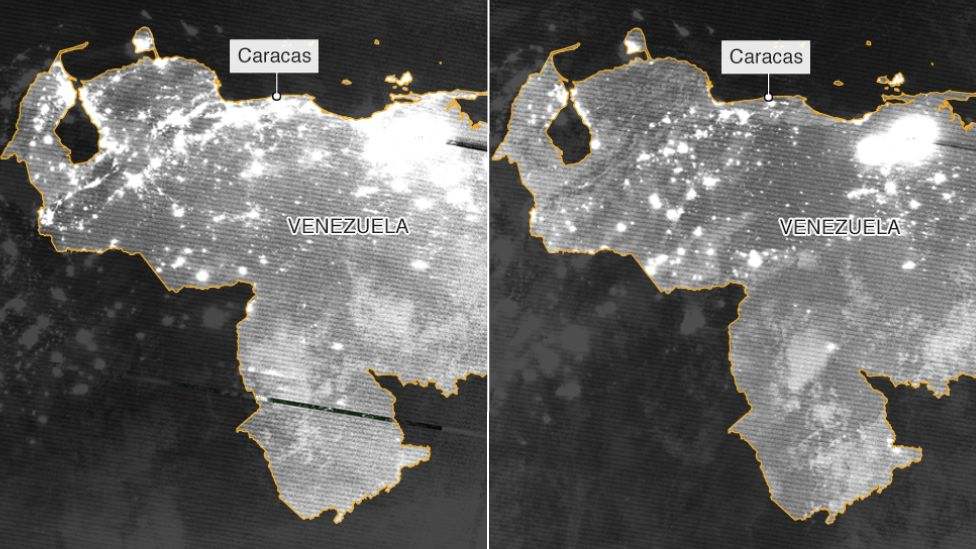
A light map of Venezuela on the night of 7 March 2019 and the night of 8 March 2019. (Note: The map also shows the world's largest gas flare (as of 2016) at Punta de Mata, in the upper right quadrant.)

Nationwide recurring electrical blackouts in Venezuela began in March 2019. Experts and state-run Corpoelec (Corporación Eléctrica Nacional) sources attribute the electricity shortages to lack of maintenance and to a lack of technical expertise in the country resulting from a brain drain. Nicolás Maduro's administration attributes them to sabotage. Since March 2019, various nationwide blackouts occurred in the country.

The first widespread blackout began on 7 March 2019 at 4:56 pm VET (GMT−4); it lasted through 14 March, when power was restored to much of the country. It was the largest power outage in the country's history, and affected the electricity sector in Venezuela in most of its 23 states, as well as the Brazilian border state of Roraima, causing serious problems in hospitals and clinics, industry, transport and in water service. At least 43 deaths resulted. On 12 March, power returned to some parts of the country, but Caracas remained only partially powered and western regions near the border with Colombia remained dark. Power outages persisted in some areas for many days after 14 March.

Between 14 and 16 of Venezuela's 23 states were again without power from 25 March to 28 March; at least four people died as a result of the three-day lack of power. Another blackout started in the evening of 29 March, followed by another 24 hours later. During the month of March, Venezuela was without power for at least 10 days overall.

The ongoing power outages have worsened the crisis in Venezuela and "suffering, cutting off water supplies and leaving hospitals and airports in the dark". On 31 March, Maduro announced a 30-day plan to ration power. Another major national blackout occurred on 22 July.

== History ==
Most of Venezuela's power comes from one of the largest hydroelectric dams in the world, Guri Dam in Bolívar State, Venezuela on the Caroni River; as of 2019, 70–80% of Venezuela's power comes from Guri. Venezuela has a history of electrical blackouts dating at least to 2010; Juan Nagel wrote in Foreign Policy in 2016 that the problems resulted from "massive government corruption [...] and the country's disastrous energy policies". Univision also reported that the problems in the energy sector resulted from corruption and "lack of maintenance and investment". A report from Transparency Venezuela said that maintenance was abandoned for twenty years beginning in 1998. The aging infrastructure made the problems worse, and critics were silenced; a union leader for state power workers was arrested in 2018 by the Bolivarian Intelligence Service for warning that a blackout was likely.

The private company, Electricidad de Caracas was owned by the United States' AES Corporation until 2007; according to The Wall Street Journal, "Venezuela's power grid was once the envy of Latin America". Then-President Hugo Chávez created the state-run Corpoelec by nationalizing the electric sector and expelling private industry in 2007; hence, the state has been solely responsible for energy supply for over ten years. Univision says Chávez "admitted failures (...) such as the 'insufficient' availability of the thermoelectric generation plant and the limitations of the national electric power transmission network and distribution systems"; he signed a decree in 2010 declaring a "State of Emergency of the National Electric Service". Chávez had Corpoelec speed up projects, and bypassing the process of public bidding for projects, he "authorized 'contracting by direct award'," which facilitated corruption.

In 2009, the Chávez administration declared a national electric emergency and invested $100 billion US dollars towards solving it. The Chávez administration "distributed million-dollar contracts without bidding that enriched high officials of his government and the works were never built", according to Univision. The Wall Street Journal stated that the government awarded electrical contracts to companies with little experience in the energy sector. Billions of dollars were awarded in contracts for projects that were never completed, leading to international investigations of "high officials of the Chavez regime today persecuted for plundering the coffers of the Bolivarian Republic". Critics say that one company, Derwick Associates, was given projects although they had no previous experience; Derwick denies any bribes were involved. Of 40 energy projects approved between 2010 and 2014 analyzed by Transparency Venezuela, 17 are not completed as of March 2019, none are operating at capacity, and overcharging by billions of dollars was identified.

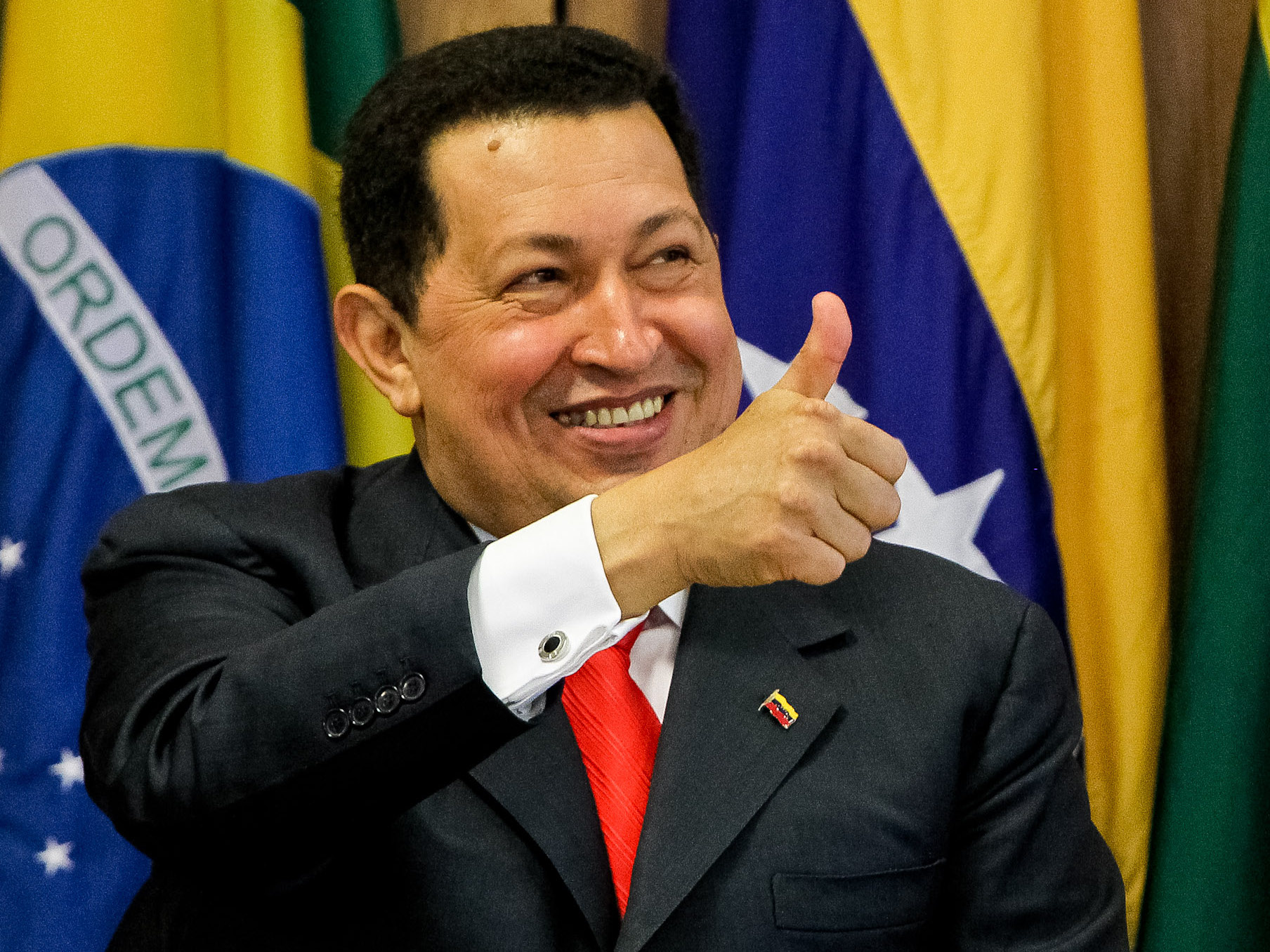
Hugo Chávez in Brasilia in 2011

Further complicating the technical matters, the administration of Corpoelec was handed over to a Venezuelan National Guard Major General, Luis Motta Domínguez, who had admitted to a lack of experience in the energy industry. Restarting an aging power grid requires specialists and equipment that may no longer be available in Venezuela, as a result of a brain drain; thousands of workers have left the country, or have left Corpoelec because of "meager wages and an atmosphere of paranoia fed by Mr. Maduro's ever-present secret police", according to experts cited by The New York Times.

There were two major blackouts in 2013. In 2016, Venezuela had a severe electricity crisis that caused blackouts, industry shutdowns, and the decision by then-President Nicolás Maduro to cut back on government employees' work hours. Maduro's administration has put rationing in place several times, and changed the country's clocks to accommodate a daytime commute. Nagel wrote in 2016, "... there are two main reasons for the crisis: excessive electricity consumption and insufficient production. And the root of both of these problems is bad governance: populism, poor planning, inflexible ideology, and overwhelming corruption." And in 2017, there were more than 18,000 power outages nationwide.

In 2017, the National Assembly investigated the $100 billion invested in the electrical system and determined that over $80 billion was embezzled, that more than 14 thermoelectric stations were not functioning, and that neither the electrical transmission nor the distribution system had adequate maintenance.

Attempts to explain the ongoing power failures, despite the billions of dollars spent, have led to public scorn and ridicule on social media; in 2018, Motta Dominguez said on Instagram, "Comrades! In some cases, faults in the electrical system are produced by animals such as: rats, mice, snakes, cats, squirrels, rabbits, turkey vultures, etc., that are looking for burrows, nests or hiding places, and are introduced into the system's equipment causing the failure." In March 2019, two Venezuelan citizens—Jesús Ramón Veroes and Luis Alberto Chacín Haddad, who live in the US and have long associations with Corpoelec's Motta Domínguez—were charged in Florida District Court with money laundering, violating the Foreign Corrupt Practices Act, and "misappropriation, theft and embezzlement of public funds by or for the benefit of a public official"; the complaint alleges millions of dollars were transferred from Corpoelec to their Florida bank accounts in 2016 and 2017.

== Causes ==
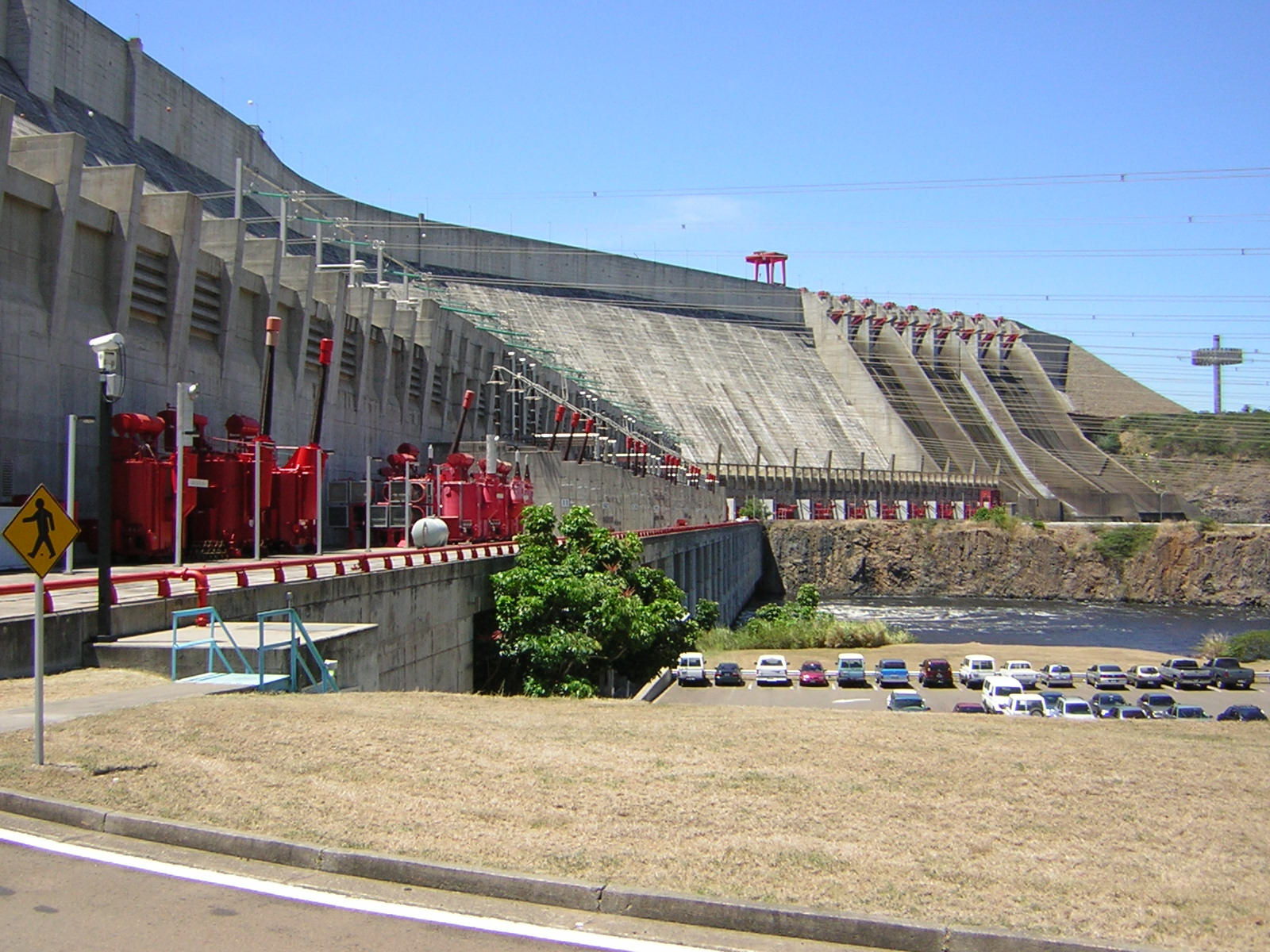
Guri Dam

Most of Venezuela's largest cities are powered from the San Geronimo B substation, connected to the hydroelectric power plant at the Gurí Dam "via one of the longest high-voltage lines in the world". Sources cited by Corpoelec indicated a vegetation fire occurred on three lines of 765 kV between the dam and the Malena and San Gerónimo B substations. The fire overheated the lines, triggering load rejection mechanisms that protect the lines connected to the dam. According to the School of Electrical Engineering of the Central University of Venezuela, the momentary loss of power at the Gurí Dam caused the turbines to increase their speed, creating an overload on electrical systems. The university further stated that the safety control systems in Gurí were activated to reduce the increased energy input, but the system became uncontrollable and forced operators to disconnect the generators in the dam. When the generators were disconnected, the electrical frequency could not be regulated and overloaded power plants located in Caruachi and Macagua. Because thermal power plants in Venezuela are not being operated due to the shortages of fuel provided by PDVSA, fluctuations in electrical frequencies exacerbated the power grid and contributed to continued blackouts.

Satellite images by NASA show that the vegetation fire in the Guri started a day before the blackout. Vegetation near power lines in Venezuela had not been pruned since 2018 – a particularly serious situation because of the dry season. Engineers and analysts quoted by The Guardian say the cause is underfunding and mismanagement, including the deployment of soldiers to operate electrical substations instead of electricians. A fault affected three large cables from the Simón Bolívar Hydroelectric Plant, which supply 80% of Venezuela's power. One cable lost power between the Malena and San Gerónimo B substations on the main network, which caused the other two to also lose power. The engineer Miguel Lara, ex-manager of the Office of Planning of the Interconnected System, quoted by El Pitazo, declared the thermal plants did not start and that the rapid response generation plants did not work, so the electric service during the blackout was restored only in some areas. The New York Times quoted José Aguilar, a Chicago-based Venezuelan power industry expert and consultant for reinsurance companies, who reviewed country-wide power levels during the blackout and said the government had attempted to restart Guri multiple times, leading to an explosion at a nearby substation. Aguilar said these restart attempts had damaged "something else in the system, destabilizing the grid yet further (...) Obviously, they are hiding something from us." The blackout occurred on Thursday 7 March; The New York Times said Corpoelec workers and a manager said no date had been set by 11 March for restart; that they were asked not to report to work that Monday; and the Times added, "[t]heir names have been withheld to protect them from government reprisals."

Another backup substation, San Geronimo A, is connected to a smaller plant at Matagua, and was able to send a weaker, intermittent current during the blackout. The government had built over a dozen backup plants powered by diesel or natural gas; none of them functioned during the outage. The New York Times said the supply of fuel required to run thermal power plants has been affected by US sanctions.

The administration of Nicolás Maduro blamed US sabotage for the outage without providing any evidence, according to the BBC and The New York Times. Maduro alleged that the US had used advanced technology for a cyberattack on the grid. Jorge Rodríguez, communications minister for the Maduro administration, pointed to Twitter posts by US Senator Marco Rubio, Secretary of State Mike Pompeo, and acting president Juan Guaidó, alleging that they demonstrated inside information about the blackout.

Guaidó said Maduro's administration had failed to maintain the electrical grid. Venezuelan energy experts cited by El Pitazo have rejected the theory that the blackout was caused by sabotage, since the area of the Gurí Dam is heavily guarded by members of the Armed Forces, where it operates a special command and the internal security of Corpolec. These specialists have also pointed out that Gurí was constructed before the Internet existed, does not use the Internet, hence does not allow for hacking. A risk management consultant cited by El Nacional dismissed the statement by government officials and assured that the design of the hydroelectric plant system does not allow "attacks" of that type. He said, "These systems can not be attacked remotely. They are closed control systems designed for generating turbines to work synchronously," and that would be "like hacking a refrigerator or a blender."

The term "electromagnetic attack" often used, for a blackout of this magnitude, to refer an electromagnetic pulse (EMP) generated by a high-altitude nuclear explosion, similar to those tested by the US in Starfish Prime or by Soviet Union's Project K. Sharon Burke from New America, a non partisan think tank, consider that such an event would be noticeable by other nations. David Weinstein, chief security officer at Claroty, a security company that specializes in protecting infrastructure, considers unlikely the use of electromagnetic bursts to knock out the Venezuelan electric grid and states that "the power fails easily in Venezuela anyway, so it's almost like a waste of the capability".

Lisandro Cabello, secretary of the state of Zulia governorship from the PSUV party, said the explosions in electrical substations in that state were caused by kites.

== Effects ==
The most vulnerable sectors of society were affected, with power, water, food, transportation and medical shortages. France 24 reported that the country lost US$200 million daily according to Carlos Larrazabal, the head of Fedecámaras; he said the biggest losses were in the food sector. Torino Capital investment bank estimated that US$1 billion was lost from Venezuela's GDP as a result of the power outages.

=== Food and water ===
With the blackout, already existing shortages of food and medicine were aggravated; refrigerated food products were damaged, and meat, fish and dairy retailers without refrigeration had to close. With ongoing disruption in refrigeration, Fedecameras said that production of meat, milk and vegetables were cut in half. One bakery said it had lost all bread dough for one day, which was equivalent in value to 56 times the monthly minimum wage.

Due to the lack of electricity, the water distribution system also had shortages. José de Viana, an engineer and former president of Hidrocapital, the municipal water company in Caracas, said that the 20,000 liters per second of water that Caracas needs fell to 13,000 during the blackouts, and later completely stopped. He said that 90% of the thermoelectric plants that work as a backup if power fails are not operational because of lack of maintenance, or they have been simply disconnected, and that "the most important population centers in the country [had] zero water supply for more than four days. Not a single drop of new water has been entering Caracas since Thursday, 7 March". According to The Washington Post, analysts said that two-thirds of Venezuela's population (20 million people) were without water, partially or completely, in the weeks after the blackouts.

In Caracas, beginning 11 March, hundreds of people swarmed the polluted Guaire River in the center of Caracas to fill plastic containers with contaminated water, or collected water from streams at El Ávila National Park. Others tried to catch water from the city's sewer drains. Hundreds of people lined up at the foot of El Ávila hill to collect water from its streams. Long lines were reported in the state of Carabobo to buy water, ice and fuel, while in the state of Lara people bathed in the sewers.

The head of the infectious disease department at the University Hospital of Caracas, Maria Eugenia Landaeta said that, without access to clean water, the chance of people contracting bacterial infections increased, and that doctors had seen during the blackouts "surges in diarrhea, typhoid fever and hepatitis A", while non-sterile water and lack of hygiene was contributing to postpartum infections. The University Hospital goes months without dependable water or power supply, and depends on water tanks and power generators.

=== Telecommunications and banking ===
An explosion occurred at an unidentified power station in the state of Bolívar on 9 March, causing additional, concurrent outages that disabled 96% of Venezuela's telecommunications infrastructure. With most of telecommunications unavailable, both access to news in Venezuelan and reports on the situation abroad were significantly reduced.

Shortages of the Venezuelan bolívar have been aggravated by the blackout. During the first days of the blackout the use of payment cards was not possible, as electricity and internet were not available, and some banks were closed. This problem, with the scarcity of cash, pushed some shops to accept only foreign currency, mostly the US dollar. The need to use hard currency frequently led to the US dollar becoming dominant for transactions whilst banking was unavailable, overriding fears of the Maduro government's loose currency controls theoretically banning foreign currency, which supposedly accelerated the process of the popular currency defaulting to US dollars. After the blackout ended, many shops and other transactions kept prices in dollars, with people publicly using and talking about the spending; about 30% of all transactions in Venezuela were being done in dollars at the time.

=== Hospital conditions and deaths ===
As of 13 March, there have been at least 43 reported deaths. At least 26 were as a direct result of a prolonged loss of electricity, though doctor Julio Castro clarified that this was based on the records of 40 primary medical centers, and the number is certainly higher. Withholding his name for fear of government reprisals, The New York Times cited a "top medical official" who said there were 47 deaths in the main hospital in Maracaibo, half of which he attributed to the blackout.

The Coalition of Organizations for the Right to Health and Life (Codevida) announced that 15 patients on renal dialysis died because these services were unavailable. El Pitazo reported that six deaths were registered in the hospital of Acarigua-Araure, in Portuguesa, two of which were direct results of blackout. The hospital was not able to work at full capacity because of fuel shortages.

Several patients with gunshot wounds – who could have received treatment – had amputations instead, for concern of "fatal complications if the blackout continued". Efecto Cocuyo reported that an 86-year-old man fell and died after fracturing his skull in Lara. Patients were robbed on two floors of a hospital that had lighting only in the emergency room from a generator when an armed group gained access to the hospital. With no light, pregnant women in another hospital had to be sent outside.

The government denied any deaths caused by the blackout; the health minister said that reports linking deaths to the blackout were false.

=== Infrastructure and industry ===
The blackout caused the Caracas Metro to shut down and public transportation to come to a standstill; the lack of transportation affected the ability of personnel to get to their jobs, for example, in the medical industry.

Restarting a power grid requires technical expertise that may no longer be present in Venezuela, and requires planning to balance and "handle the power surges and fluctuations involved in bringing power back online". Since the original outage, there have been ongoing electrical substation explosions, causing further outages, including one in southeastern Caracas, and a chain of explosions at substations in Maracaibo.

According to Conindustria, the industrial sector lost about $220 million during March due to the blackouts.

The blackout damaged elements of petroleum delivery, operations were disrupted, and some damaged installations cannot be brought back online quickly; Venezuela's long-term oil production capacity could be affected. Ali Moshiri, who oversaw Chevron operations in Venezuela, said he had warned the government for years that the oil fields needed independent power supplies, but his advice had not been heeded; he said, "All of the oil field production is tied into the public grid and if the public grid goes down, those fields get shut in." The International Energy Agency says that because of the economic situation in Venezuela, and problems with the electricity supply, the entire Venezuelan industry is at risk of collapsing.

Venezuela was once one of the three top producers of OPEC crude oil; ten years ago, it produced over 3 million barrels per day (BPD), and in February 2018, 2 million BPD. Production "has been declining for years due to economic collapse"; in March, Venezuela lost another 150,000 barrels per day in production. An oil expert told France 24 that production completely ceased at one point during the blackouts. The lack of power caused most of Venezuela's oil rigs to be shut down, and for a short time, cut the country's production in half. Unnamed sources told Bloomberg that, because of the power outages, output had dipped as low as 600,000 BPD, although Bloomberg says that production averaged 890,000 BPD for the month of March, and Venezuela told OPEC it produced 960,000 BPD. Wills Rangel, a former director of PDVSA, said the Orinoco Belt has not yet recovered from the blackouts; cleaning or repairing pipes that clogged while the heating system that helps the heavy crude move through pipelines was down could take months. Four upgraders—"facilities that convert the extra-heavy oil to more commercial blends"—require power and have not resumed production as of 5 April 2019, as the power grid has not been stabilized. By April, Venezuela's exports were steady at a million barrels daily, "partially due to inventory drains".

Five days without power "wiped out what little was left of Venezuela's heavy industry" in steel, aluminum and iron, according to The New York Times. Because of the blackout, equipment used to make aluminum at the state-run Venalum, a subsidiary of Corporación Venezolana de Guayana, was damaged and the entire industry shut down. Venezuela's largest steelmaker SIDOR ceased operating permanently after the blackout. Its production had been gradually decreasing since the company was nationalized in 2008 by Hugo Chávez. A former director said that Chávez had "received it as a productive and solvent company; but management coming from the military world, unaware of 'steel manufacturing' activity, together with the 'absence of strategic planning and investments, led to a sustained fall in production'." The Alcasa aluminum plant and at least three other iron smelters also shut down. Many of the heavy industry plants had been operating at low capacity because of poor management, with laborers reporting to work because free meals were offered.

=== Education ===
Classes in primary schools, high schools and universities were suspended.

=== Looting ===
During the night of 9 March and the early morning of 10 March, there was looting at Avenida San Martín in Caracas; locals tried to drive away the looters. Later that night, tanks of the Bolivarian National Police (PNB) traveled through the area without stopping the attempted looting. At 1:30 in the morning, two tanks arrived in the area and fired tear gas bombs at the looters then remained to guard the area. In the early hours, people were looting a supermarket in La Florida, mostly taking liquor and personal hygiene items. A worker at the store said that they found leftover candles, which were presumably used to find entrance to the building. On 10 March, another group tried to loot the supermarket at the La Pirámide shopping center in Baruta Municipality. National Police officers arrested at least 50 people.

According to Fedecámaras, in only two days, more than 350 stores were looted in the state of Zulia, and The New York Times said 523 stores were looted during the week in Maracaibo. Authorities either responded late or ignored the looting in many cases, and withdrew from most places except one area in the west of Maracaibo, where around 400 people tried to loot until soldiers of the Venezuelan National Guard (GNB) arrived. Hundreds of buildings were looted in the city, not only because of a lack of electricity but also a lack of supply of gasoline and drinking water; 70% of the Delicias Norte shopping center was looted, 30 stores in Centro Sambil were looted, and the Curva de Molina sector was completely destroyed. At a bakery in the center of the city a group of people threw a tear gas bomb before looting.

Businesses in Barcelona, Anzoátegui were looted on 11 March and 29 people were arrested.

=== Power rationing ===
On 31 March, Maduro announced a 30-day plan to ration power. The president of Venezuela's Electrical and Mechanical Engineering Association said the power grid was " barely generating between 5,500 and 6,000 megawatts, when it has the capacity to generate 34,000 megawatts". Maduro's administration announced that the workday would be shortened to 2:00 pm, that schools would remain closed, and that access to water would be a priority. On 5 April, Corpoelec published a power rationing schedule, indicating that Caracas and part of Miranda state would not be rationed, and rationing would be implemented in five three-hour blocks for at least 30 days.

The governor Omar Prieto announced on 9 April that the electricity rationing in the Zulia state would last up to 12 hours per day.

== Investigation and arrests ==
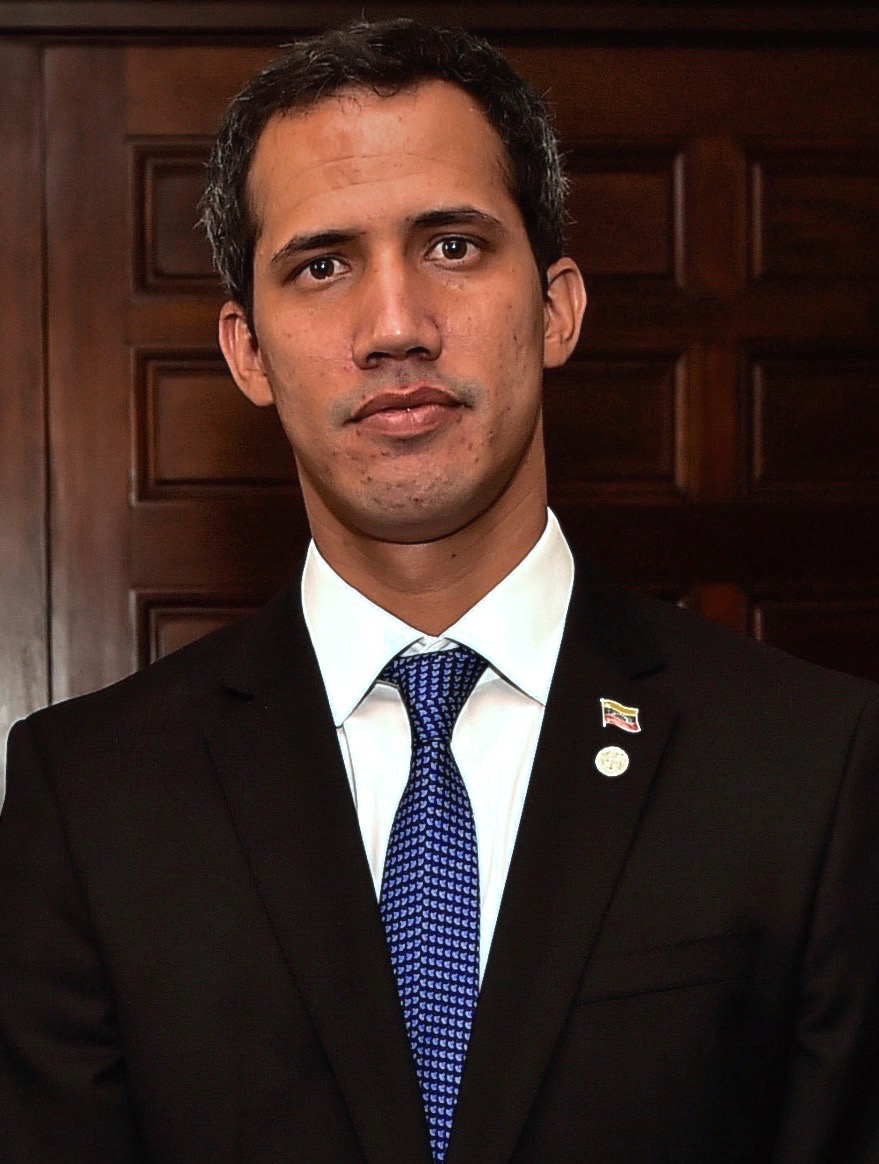
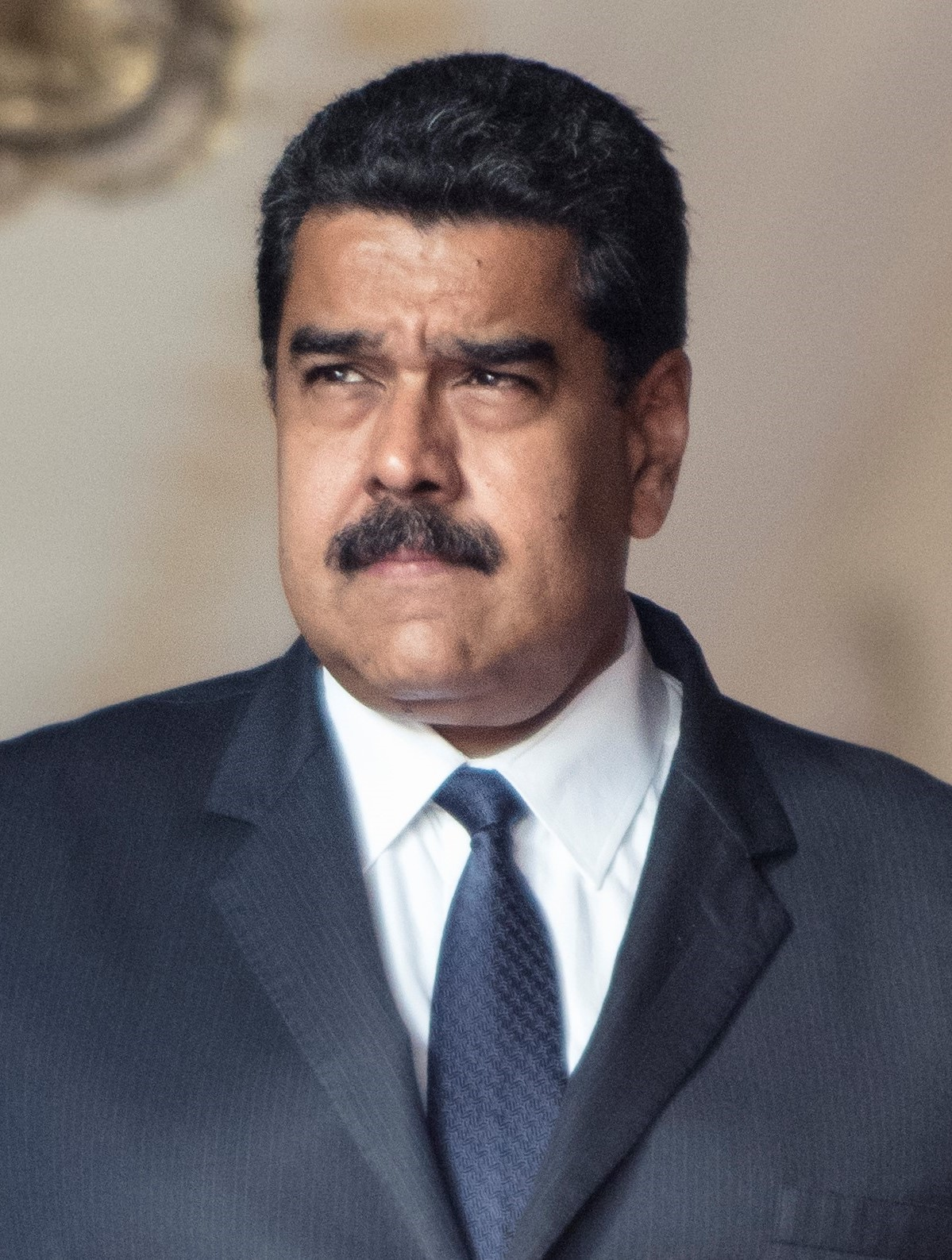
Juan Guaidó and Nicolás Maduro

The blackout came in the midst of the 2019 Venezuelan presidential crisis, that started when the National Assembly declared that Nicolás Maduro's 2018 reelection was invalid and the body declared its president, Juan Guaidó, to be acting president of the nation. Maduro's Prosecutor General Tarek William Saab announced an investigation of Guaidó for sabotage of the power grid, alleging he was an "intellectual author" of the "attack".

Maduro called on the colectivos, saying, "The time has come for active resistance". US State Department special envoy to Venezuela Elliott Abrams labeled this a "breakdown in law and order", and said, "That's calling for armed gangs to take over the streets (...) Perhaps it is a sign of Maduro's lack of confidence in his own security forces." The United States withdrew all embassy personnel from Venezuela.

National Assembly deputy Juan Andrés Mejía announced that the legislature had communicated with and sought assistance from Brazil, Colombia, Germany, Spain, the United States and several Caribbean island countries, and asked that OLADE (Latin American Organization for Energy) send a commission to investigate the cause. Maduro said he would ask Russia, China, Iran and Cuba for help in investigating the cyberattack on the power grid, and that two people had been arrested in connection with the attack.

Between the evening of 11 March and the morning of 12 March, Bolivarian Intelligence Service agents raided the Caracas residence of journalist Luis Carlos Díaz, arrested him, and detained him at El Helicoide, accusing him of instigating the blackout. He was released after a hearing, and was charged with "instigation to commit a crime", was obligated to appear before the courts every eight days, and was prohibited from leaving the country, making declarations to the media or participating in public demonstrations.

Roberto Marrero, Guaidó's chief of staff, was arrested by SEBIN during a raid on his home in the early morning hours of 21 March. He was accused of terrorism and involvement in the blackout. During the 2019 Venezuelan presidential crisis, the US had repeatedly warned Maduro not to go after Guaidó; Haaretz reported that the arrest of Guaidó's number-two person was a test of the US. A risk consultant for London's IHS Markit, Diego Moya-Ocampos, said to Bloomberg that "the regime is testing the international community and its repeated warnings against laying a hand on Maduro's rival [Guaidó] ... if they can't touch him, they'll go after those close to him." Nicholas Watson of Teneo Intelligence told The Wall Street Journal that "Marrero's arrest looks like a desperate attempt to break Guaidó's momentum .. The weakness in the regime's position is visible in the fact that arresting Guaidó himself would be seen as a step too far."

== Sequels ==
=== Second ===
Two weeks after power was restored from the 7 March blackout, Venezuela was still enduring ongoing power outages; on 25 March, another widespread blackout occurred. The Guardian reported that half the country was affected, and other media sources said 14 to 16 of Venezuela's 23 states were without power. The Caracas Metro shut down, shops closed early to avoid looting, private and government workers were sent home, and 91% of telecommunications were down. Oil exports in Puerto José were halted due to lack of electricity.

The BBC reported that Information Minister Jorge Rodríguez "had gone on state TV earlier to repeat the now-familiar assertion that opposition sabotage rather than a lack of maintenance had caused the afternoon blackout, saying hackers had attacked computers at the country's main hydroelectric dam." Maduro later claimed that the blackout was caused by a rifle, "probably by a sniper hired by the opposition", causing ridicule from Venezuelans. Guaidó said, "despite the persecution and intimidation, there are honest people in Corpoelec" who inform us about the cause of the outage, which he said was an electrical fault in the San Jerónimo – La Horqueta – La Arenosa line that caused an overload in the substations.

Rodríguez stated that most of the service was reestablished in record time; power was restored in the evening but went out again during the night. As the blackout continued, businesses were closed for three days, and school and universities were cancelled.

In the hospitals monitored by the group Physicians for Health (Medicos por la Salud), four patients died because of the blackout. Three were elderly women in Caracas and Maracay, who could not be moved in time to an emergency room because elevators were not working due to the power outage, and one was an elderly man who died in San Cristóbal. Of the hospitals that were monitored, 71% were without water, and 53% had power from generators.

Most cities had recovered from the blackout by 28 March, and oil exports in Puerto José were restarted.

=== End of March–Early April ===
Intermittent service continued after the first two widespread blackouts. Another blackout started in the evening of 29 March. A fourth blackout occurred on 30 March, at the same time in the evening (7:10 pm local time) as the third, affecting at least 20 states. Classes in schools and universities restarted on 3 April.

On 9 April, power was again out in parts of Caracas and in more than 20 states of the country; this blackout occurred even after a rationing plan was put in place and at places and times where and when the plan called for power to be on. About 90% of the country's telecommunications infrastructure went offline.

=== July ===
Another major national blackout occurred on the evening of 22 July. Nineteen states were affected. NetBlocks measurements, indicate that only 6% of the country telecommunications remained active. Non-stop state TV transmissions were off the air. Subway transportation was also affected on rush hour traffic. Work and schools were suspended the following day. Maduro's administration reiterated the "electromagnetic attack" allegations as the cause of the blackout. This blackout happened on the eve of an expected public assembly by Juan Guaidó. "They tried to hide the tragedy by rationing supplies across the country, but their failure is evident: they destroyed the system and they don't have answers," said Guaidó during the blackout.

Power returned to Caracas the following day. According to the new energy minister, Freddy Brito, power had returned to five of the states on 23 July.

== Reactions ==
The National Assembly declared a state of emergency as an answer to the nationwide blackout.

The Lima Group held Maduro entirely responsible for the outage. Declaring that the Group stands in solidarity with "the Venezuelan people [who] have been suffering for years", the Group issued a statement saying the "situation only confirms the existence and magnitude of the humanitarian crisis that the Maduro regime refuses to recognize." The statement said, "Only a legitimate government that emerged from free and democratic elections can carry out the reconstruction of the institutions, infrastructure and economy of the country that Venezuelans need to recover their dignity, the exercise of civic freedoms and the respect of their human rights."

China offered to help restore the electrical system. A spokesperson for the Chinese Foreign Ministry said they hoped the cause could be found quickly; without further detail, he said that China had received reports that the power grid had gone down due to a hacking attack and that "China is willing to provide help and technical support to restore Venezuela's power grid."

Russian Foreign Ministry Spokeswoman Maria Zakharova said that Russia agrees with Maduro that Western sabotage caused the power outage in Venezuela. She alleged that "it was an attempt to remotely influence control systems at major electrical substations where Canadian-made equipment is installed". President of Bolivia Evo Morales labeled the outage "a cowardly act of terror" and rejected what he called the continuous meddling of the US in Venezuela's affairs. President of Cuba Miguel Díaz-Canel condemned the "aggression against Venezuela" and labeled the sabotage a "terrorist attack".

US special envoy for Venezuela, Elliott Abrams, denied any US responsibility, saying, "This is a multiyear decline in Venezuela. The situation there, due to the mismanagement, the economic policies and the sheer corruption of this regime, are the cause of those problems."

During the second blackout, on 26 March Guaidó said the "blackout shows that the dictator is incapable of finding a solution to the crisis". He criticized that after government officials claimed that the cause of the blackout was a cyberattack, they changed the narrative to claim it was produced by "sabotage", stressing that the electric facilities are heavily militarized. Following the fourth blackout, Guaidó said that he will enlist help from the Japanese government to address the blackouts, and that Japan's many electricity-related companies were prepared to invest in Venezuela to help improve the power situation.

Chavista deputy Eduardo Labrador, representing the Maduro government PSUV party in Zulia state, asked in mid-March that Motta Domínguez, in office since 2015, be dismissed as head of Corpoelec. On 1 April, Motta Domínguez was fired and replaced by a 65-year-old electrical engineer, Igor Gavidia León. In May, Gavidia León was replaced with engineer Freddy Brito.

=== Protests ===
Guaidó "took to the streets" to question Maduro's governance during the first two days of the blackout. According to The New York Times, "Maduro did not address the nation and his public silence has fed the tension gripping Caracas".

Protests against Maduro in Caracas and other cities were called for 9 March, and went on despite the closure of the Caracas Metro and the lack of social media. The rally headed by Guaidó, took place near the presidential palace in Miraflores; The Washington Post labeled the manifestation as "unusual" as it was held in a sector usually associated with Maduro supporters. Heavy police presence blocked the streets with anti-riot shields.

During the second nationwide blackout, Guaidó summoned new protests that would precede Operation Freedom (Spanish: Operación Libertad), a decisive massive rally through Caracas. According to Guaidó, the goal of the protests is to increase political pressure, but rehearsals are needed as the operation cannot be organized "from one day to the next". After Maduro's government talked about a cybernetic and electromagnetic attack, and about a sniper, Guaidó asked what would be the next version.

Thousands of Venezuelans participated in a rally on Saturday, 30 March, against the recurring blackouts. Guaidó toured around Miranda state and Caracas giving several speeches. A rival pro-Maduro march was held the same day to protest against "imperialism" and in "defense of liberty". Anti-riot police used tear gas against several opposition groups in areas where the Maduro supporters were active. Cacerolazos were reported in Caracas after blackouts resumed on Saturday night.

The next day, protests against the lack of electricity and water occurred in Caracas and other cities. Some of the protests occurred close to the presidential palace. Maduro called again on the colectivos, asking them "to defend the peace of every barrio, of every block". Videos circulated on social media showing colectivos threatening protesters and shooting in the streets; two protestors were shot. On Sunday night, police fired at protesters after they set burning barricades.

=== Public opinion ===
According to a March poll by Meganálisis, 84.3% of Venezuelans reject the electrical sabotage theory. A poll by Hercon Consultores of 1,000 voters surveyed between 26 March and 4 April 2019 found similar – that 87.5% of Venezuelans reject the theory.

== See also ==
Venezuela

- 2024 Venezuelan blackouts

Other

- List of major power outages
- 2019 Argentina, Paraguay and Uruguay blackout
- Manhattan blackout of July 2019
