= Electricidad de Caracas =

Electricity company serving greater Caracas, Venezuela

CA La Electricidad de Caracas
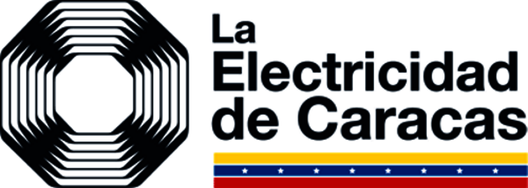
- Type: Public
- Traded as: BVC: EDC
- Industry: Electricity
- Founded: 1895
- Founder: Ricardo Zuloaga
- Defunct: July 31, 2007
- Fate: Absorbed into Corpoelec
- Successor: Corpoelec
- Headquarters: Caracas, Venezuela
- Area served: Gran Caracas
- Products: Electric power
- Services: Electric power distribution
- Revenue: ▲US$835.5 million (2008)
- Operating income: ▼ - US$140.1 million (2008)
- Number of employees: 2,900
- Subsidiaries: Electricidad de Guarenas y Guatire
- Website: www.laedc.com.ve

Electricidad de Caracas was the integrated electricity company for Caracas, Venezuela and surrounding areas, with more than 1 million connections. It was acquired by AES Corporation in 2000 and sold to the state-owned oil company PDVSA in 2007, which now owns 93.62%. Paul Hanrahan, president and CEO of AES said the deal had been a fair process that respected the rights of investors. Since 2007 and the nationalization of the electricity generation and transportation, it has been incorporated into Corpoelec.

For that year the president of Electricity of Caracas was Eng. Javier Alvarado Ochoa who would become vice minister to the Ministry of Popular Power for Electric Energy by presidential decree No. 7,241 on February 12, 2010 this would serve as a link with other public officials who would be implicated in the contracts of Derwick Associates without adequate experience and accused of receiving bribes.

== See also ==
- Energy policy of Venezuela
