= Corpoelec =

Venezuelan electricity company

Corporación Eléctrica Nacional, S.A.
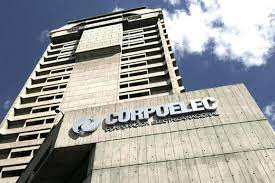
- Trade name: CORPOELEC
- Company type: State-owned enterprise
- Industry: Electricity
- Founded: July 31, 2007; 18 years ago
- Founder: Hugo Chávez
- Headquarters: Caracas, Venezuela
- Services: Electricity provider for all of Venezuela
- Owner: Government of Venezuela
- Subsidiaries: Corpoelec Industrial
- Website: www.corpoelec.gob.ve

Corporación Eléctrica Nacional, S.A., often known by its abbreviation Corpoelec, is a fully integrated state power corporation of Venezuela. It was created in 2007 by merging ten state-owned and six private-owned power companies. The former president of the company, from 2015 to 2019, was Luis Motta Domínguez, the Minister of Electricity and general of the Venezuelan Army. He was dismissed by President Nicolás Maduro in April 2019, following a series of blackouts that occurred in March 2019.

== See also ==
- Electricity sector in Venezuela
