= List of power stations in Venezuela =

This article lists all power stations in Venezuela. Although Venezuela has one of the world's largest hydroelectric generating plants, its energy consumption is dominated by oil and gas.

== Gas ==
Station	Locality	Coordinates	Capacity (MW)
Argimiro Gabaldón	Lara		135
Barinas	Barinas		100
Cardon Genevapca	Falcon		315
Castillito	Carabobo		85
El Furrial	Monagas		232
Guarenas	Miranda		156
Termozulia	Zulia		1,590

== Hydroelectric ==
Station	Locality	Coordinates	Capacity (MW)	Ref
Caruachi	Bolivar		2,280	
Guri	Bolivar		10,235	
Juan A Rodriguez	Barinas		80	
Peña Larga	Barinas		80	
Macagua I	Bolivar		384	
Macagua II	Bolivar		1,592	
Macagua III	Bolivar		176	
Masparro	Barinas		25	
Tocoma	Bolivar		2,320	under construction

== See also ==
- Energy policy of Venezuela
- List of power stations in South America
- List of largest power stations in the world
