= Energy policy of Venezuela =

Venezuela has the largest conventional oil reserves and the second-largest natural gas reserves in the Western Hemisphere. In addition Venezuela has non-conventional oil deposits (extra-heavy crude oil, bitumen and tar sands) approximately equal to the world's reserves of conventional oil. Venezuela is also amongst world leaders in hydroelectric production, supplying a majority of the nation's electrical power through the process.

== Development of energy policies ==
On 29 August 1975, during the tenure of President Carlos Andrés Pérez, "Law that Reserves the Hydrocarbon Industry to the State" was enacted and the state-owned company Petróleos de Venezuela (PDVSA) was created to control all oil businesses in the Venezuelan territory. The law came into effect on 1 January 1976, as well as the nationalization of the oil industry with it, after which PDVSA began commercial operations.

== Primary energy sources ==
=== Oil ===
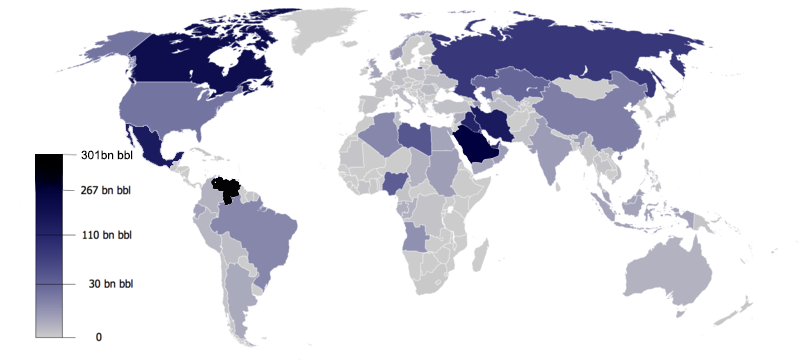
A map of world oil reserves according to OPEC, 2013

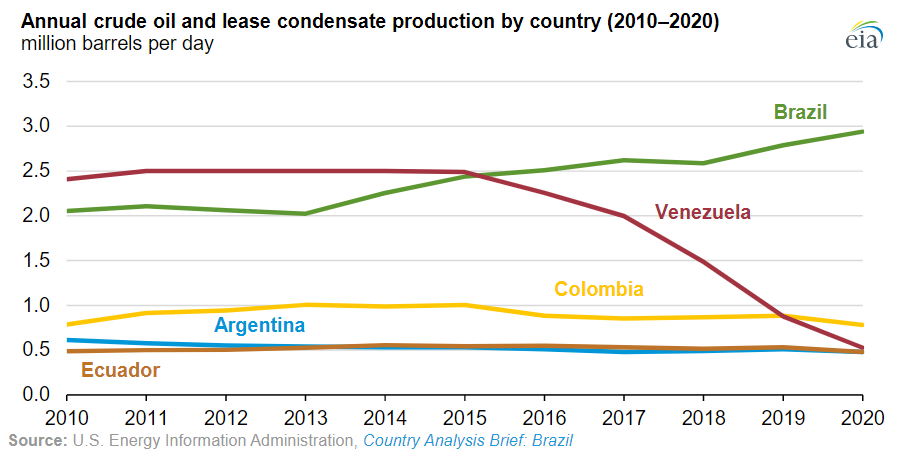
Oil production in Venezuela (red) fell markedly between 2015 and 2020

Venezuela has been producing oil for nearly a century and was an OPEC founding member. In 2005, Venezuela produced 162 million tons of oil, which is 4.1% of world's total production. Venezuela ranks seventh in the world for oil production. Venezuela is the world's eight oil exporter and fifth largest net exporter. In 2012, 11 percent of US oil imports came from Venezuela.

Since 2010, when the heavy oil from the Orinoco Belt was considered to be economically recoverable, Venezuela has had the largest proved reserves of petroleum in the world, about 298 billion barrels.

Oil accounts for about half of total government revenues. The leading oil company is Petróleos de Venezuela S.A. (PDVSA), which according to Venezuelan authorities produces 3.3 million barrels per day (520,000 m^{3}/d). However, oil industry analysts and the U.S. Energy Information Administration believe it to be only 2.8–2.9 million barrels per day (460,000 m^{3}/d). Venezuela's main oil fields are located at four major sedimentary basins: Maracaibo, Falcón, Apure, and Oriental. PdVSA has 1.28 million barrels per day (204,000 m^{3}/d) of crude oil refining capacity. The major facilities are the Paraguaná Refining Center, Puerto de la Cruz, and El Palito.

=== Natural gas ===
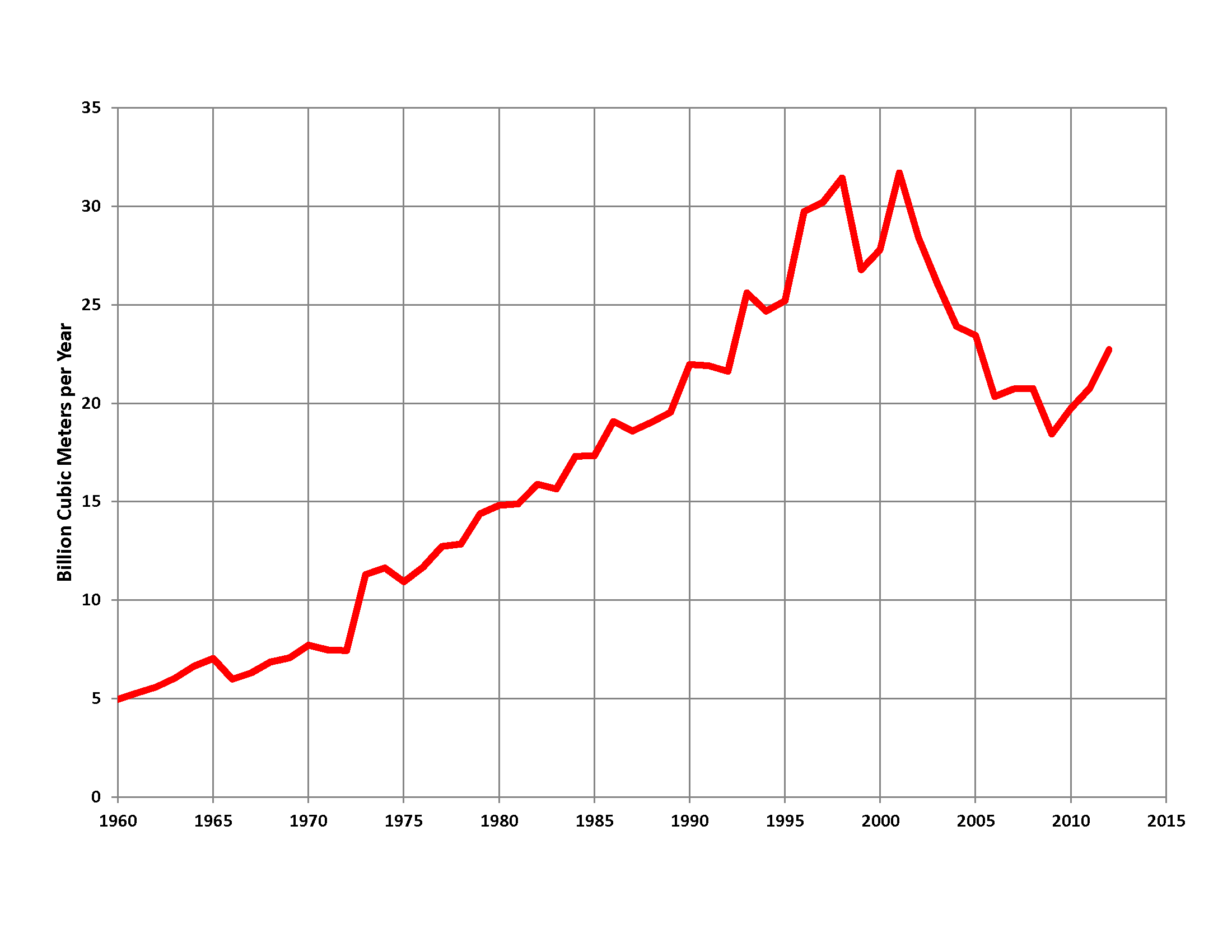
Venezuela natural gas production (OPEC)

Countries by natural gas proven reserves (2014), based on data from The World Factbook

As of 2013, Venezuela has the eighth-largest proved natural gas reserves in the world and the largest in South America. Proved reserves were estimated at 5.5 trillion cubic meters (tcm). However, inadequate transportation and distribution infrastructure has prevented it from making the most of its resources. More than 70% of domestic gas production is consumed by the petroleum industry. Nearly 35% of gross natural gas output are re-injected in order to boost or maintain reservoir pressures, while smaller amounts (5%) are vented or flared. About 10% of production volumes are subject to shrinkage as a result of the extraction of NGLs. The 2010 estimate is 176 trillion cubic feet (5,000 km^{3}), and the nation reportedly produced about 848 billion cubic feet (2.40×10^{10} m^{3}) in 2008.

The leading gas company is PdVSA. The largest private natural gas producer is Repsol-YPF, who supplies 80-megawatt (MW) power station in Portuguesa, and plans to develop a 450-MW power plant in Obispos.

=== Tar sands and heavy oils ===
Venezuela has non-conventional oil deposits (extra-heavy crude oil, bitumen and tar sands) at 1,200 billion barrels (1.9×10^{11} m^{3}) approximately equal to the world's reserves of conventional oil. About 267 billion barrels (4.24×10^{10} m^{3}) of this may be producible at current prices using current technology. The main deposits are located in the Orinoco Belt in central Venezuela (Orinoco tar sands), some deposits are also found in the Maracaibo Basin and Lake Guanoco, near the Caribbean coast.

=== Coal ===
Venezuela has recoverable coal reserves of approximately 528 million short tons (Mmst), most of which is bituminous. Coal production was at 9.254 million short tons as of 2007. Most coal exports go to Latin American countries, the United States and Europe.

The main coal company in Venezuelas is Carbozulia, a former subsidiary of PdVSA, which is controlled by Venezuela's state development agency Corpozulia. The major coal-producing region in Venezuela is the Guasare Basin, which is located near the Colombian border. The coal industry development plans include the construction of a railway linking coal mines to the coast and a new deepwater port.

== Electricity ==
The main electricity source is hydropower, which accounts for 71% in 2004. A gross theoretical capability of hydropower is 320 TWh per annum, of which 130 TWh per annum is considered as economically feasible. In 2004, Venezuela produced 70 TWh of hydropower, which accounts 2.5% of world's total. At the end of 2002, total installed hydroelectric generating capacity accounted 13.76 GW with additional 4.5 GW under construction and 7.4 GW of planned capacity.

Hydroelectricity production is concentrated on the Caroní River in Guayana Region. Today it has 4 different dams. The largest hydroplant is the Guri dam with 10,200 MW of installed capacity, which makes it the third-largest hydroelectric plant in the world. Other facilities on the Caroní are Caruachi, Macagua I, Macagua II and Macagua III, with a total of 15.910 MW of installed capacity in 2003. New dams, Tocoma (2 160 MW) and Tayucay (2 450 MW), are currently under construction between Guri and Caruachi. With a projected installed capacity for the whole Hydroelectric Complex (upstream Caroni River and downstream Caroni River), between 17.250 and 20.000 MW in 2010.

The largest power companies are state-owned CVG Electrificación del Caroní (EDELCA), a subsidiary of the mining company Corporación Venezolana de Guayana (CVG), and Compania Anonima de Administracion y Fomento Electrico (CADAFE) accounting respectively for approximately 63% and 18% of generating capacities. Other state-owned power companies are ENELBAR and ENELVEN-ENELCO (approximately 8% of capacities). In 2007, PDVSA bought 82.14% percent of Electricidad de Caracas (EDC) from AES Corporation as part of a renationalization program. Subsequently, the ownership share rose to 93.62% (December 2008). EDC has 11% of Venezuelan capacity, and owns the majority of conventional thermal power plants. The rest of the power production is owned by private companies.

The national transmission system (Sistema Inrterconectado Nacional- SIN) is composed by four interconnected regional transmission systems operated by EDELCA, CADAFE, EDC and ENELVEN-ENELCO. Oficina de Operacion de Sistema Interconectados (OPSIS), jointly owned by the four vertical integrated electric companies, operate the SIN under an RTPA regime.

== Environmental issues ==
Prolonged oil production has resulted in significant oil pollution along the Caribbean coast. Hydrocarbons extraction has resulted also in the subsiding of the eastern shore of Lake Maracaibo, South America's largest lake. Venezuela is also the region's top emitter of carbon dioxide.

== Regional cooperation ==
Venezuela has pushed the creation of regional oil initiatives for the Caribbean (Petrocaribe), the Andean region (Petroandino), and South America (Petrosur), and Latin America (Petroamerica). The initiatives include assistance for oil developments, investments in refining capacity, and preferential oil pricing. The most developed of these three is the Petrocaribe initiative, with 13 nations signed agreement in 2005. Under Petrocaribe, Venezuela would offer crude oil and petroleum products to Caribbean nations under preferential terms and prices. The payment system allows for a few nations to buy oil on market value but only a certain amount is needed up front; the remainder can be paid through a 25-year financing agreement on 1% interest. The deal allows for the Caribbean nations to purchase up to 185 million barrels (29,400,000 m^{3}) of oil per day on these terms. In addition it allows for nations to pay part of the cost with other products provided to Venezuela, such as bananas, rice, and sugar.

In 2000, Venezuela and Cuba signed an agreement, which grants Venezuelan oil supplies to Cuba.

In 2006, the construction of the Trans-Caribbean gas pipeline, which wpiñd connect Venezuela and Colombia with extension to Panama (and probably to Nicaragua) began. The pipeline would pump gas from Colombia to Venezuela and, after 7 years, from Venezuela to Colombia. Venezuela has also proposed the project of Gran Gasoducto del Sur, which would connect Venezuela with Brazil and Argentina. There has been some discussion about constructing an oil pipeline to Colombia along the Pacific Ocean.

Venezuela also exports electricity to neighboring countries. Santa Elena/Boa Vista Interconnector permits electricity export to Brazil, and Cuatricenternario/Cuestecitas Interconnector and EI Corozo/San Mateo Interconnector to Colombia.

Venezuela may suffer a deterioration of its power in international affairs if the global transition to renewable energy is completed. It is ranked 151 out of 156 countries in the index of Geopolitical Gains and Losses after energy transition (GeGaLo).

As of 2019, PetroCaribe has mostly dried up because of Venezuela's eroded domestic production and refining, but political and commercial ties in some prominent cases have endured. Critics say PetroCaribe suppressed the development of renewable energy, burdened these small nations with billions of dollars in debt – and spurred corruption. Venezuela oil industry is in turmoil. Venezuela's oil rigs, which had been producing nearly 3 million barrels of crude oil a day in 2014, produce now less than a million barrels a day. In addition to the economic collapse of Venezuela, U.S. sanctions against the country made it almost impossible to route bank payments to Venezuela. The only country receiving crude oil from Venezuela at this type of preferential treatment is Cuba. It is still getting some oil through Petrocaribe and Cuba doesn't have the debt problems because it brokered a deal to pay for its oil by sending doctors to Venezuela.

== See also ==
- Petroleos de Venezuela S.A. (PDVSA)
- Renewable energy
- Trans-Caribbean pipeline
