= Llovizna Falls =

Waterfall in Venezuela

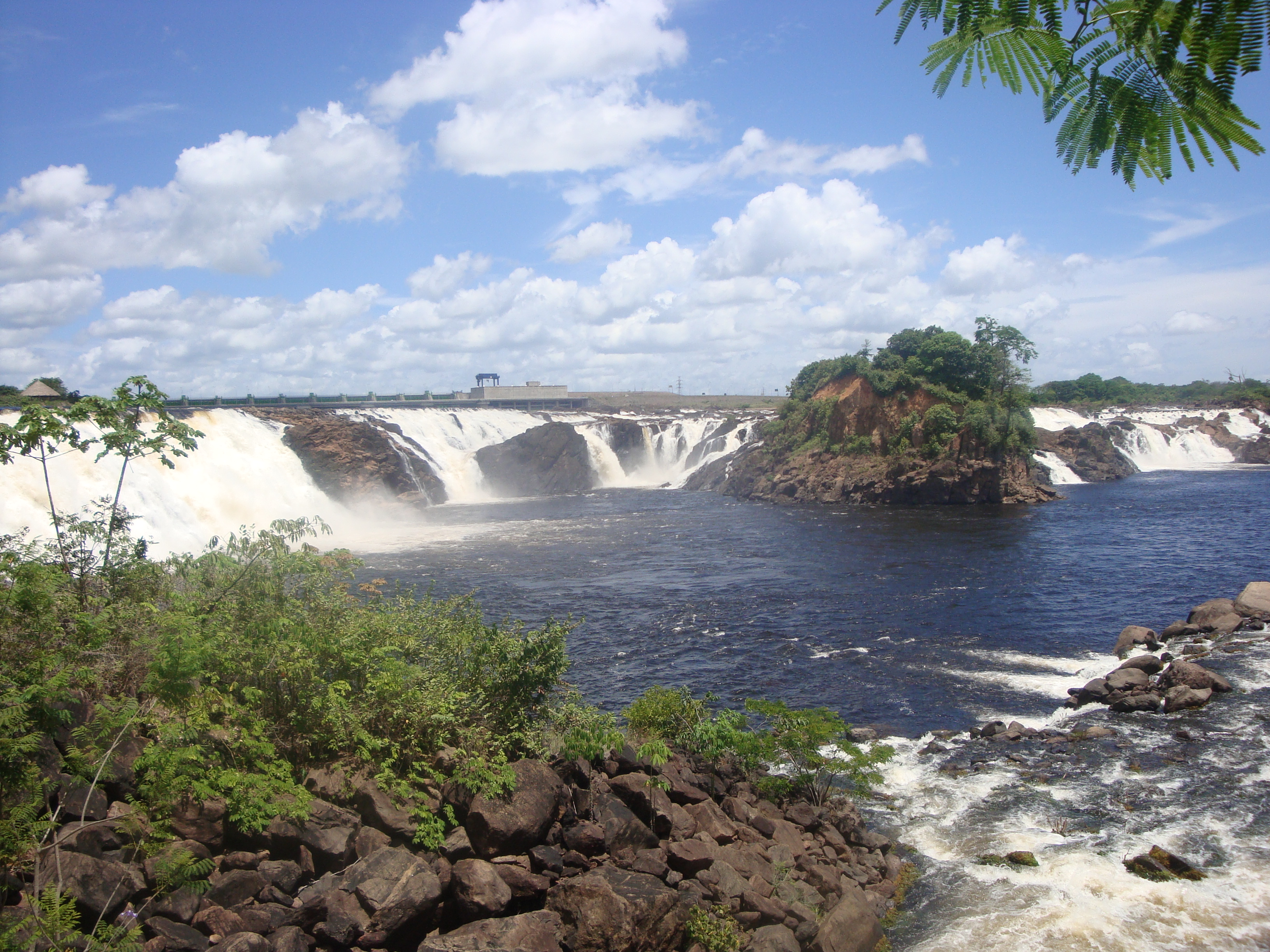
- Interactive map of Llovizna Falls
- Location: Puerto Ordaz, Bolívar, Venezuela
- Coordinates: 8°18′36.1516″N 62°40′37.2072″W
- Watercourse: Caroní River

Llovizna Falls is a waterfall on the Caroní River, close to its confluence with the Orinoco, located in the Llovizna Park, Puerto Ordaz, Venezuela. The nearby Macagua Dam has reduced the flow over the waterfall in recent years, but the cascade continues to be spectacular and returns to its former glory several times a year when the floodgates of the dam are opened.

(Llovizna - "yoviz-nah", is Spanish for mist, drizzle, spray).

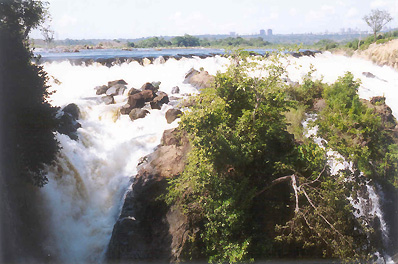
Llovizna Falls, Puerto Ordaz, Venezuela (2004)

== Activities ==
The Llovizna Park has many green areas and benches where people can spend time. In the stone theater, located close to the entrance of the park, visitors can enjoy the different shows and plays that locals do to entertain the community and increase tourism. The park has a restaurant that sells the typical plates from the state such as arepas, empanadas, tequeños, and many other things. The park offers wide walkaways used by people to ride bicycles, run, jog, or walk. There are also training machines that are free for visitors. The park offers a bus tour that takes the visitors to the most frequented parts of the park such as the Stone Theater, the waterfall, the iron bridge.

=== Recommendations for visitors ===
Visitors are advised to wear athletic footwear and lightweight clothing suitable for warm, humid conditions. Navigating the terrain requires traversing rocks and bridges. Precautionary measures include remaining cautious of wildlife, keeping children supervised, and inspecting resting areas. Because Venezuela experiences distinct wet and dry seasons, the park is accessible throughout the year.

== Biodiversity ==
With Venezuela being one of the top most biodiverse nations on earth, the park is naturally full of flora and fauna, with many endemic species being found there. One of the most common animals in the park is the tufted capuchin; although these monkeys may appear curious and display a mischievous interest in park visitors, humans are not authorized to touch or feed the monkeys (or any wild animals), as they carry disease and have large, sharp canine teeth, which they are liable to use. Monkeys are notoriously ill-tempered and can become possessive of the most benign of objects (such as food, hats, sunglasses, etc), and will retaliate quickly if they feel offended or manipulated. Feeding them makes the monkeys lose their fear of humans, leading to future potential conflicts and even monkey deaths.

The park is also home to a wide variety of invertebrates, including large spiders, such as the tarantulas Psalmopoeus irminia and Epicadus. The park also has a wide variety of reptiles and amphibians, including several species of the diminutive poison arrow frogs, considered to be the ‘jewels’ of the forest. These tiny amphibians are so small they must eat tiny insects, notably ants and certain beetles, which produce elements such as formic acid; the frogs are able to retain these compounds in their bodies, effectively rendering them deadly if consumed by a potential predator (captive poison arrow frogs lose this capability due to an altered diet of crickets and fruit flies). Their vivid coloration is a warning signal, in nature, that translates as “poisonous”. The largest and most recognized reptile is likely the green anaconda.

The natural biodiversity of the park is largely due to two the rivers flowing through the area, one of them being the second-longest on the continent (the Orinoco). The park is located in the Guayana natural region.

== Stories and folklore ==
=== The Tragedy of the Teachers ===
In August 1964, a tragedy happened in the park. The iron chain bridge used to be a wood chain bridge. A group of about 300 teachers from different states of the country met to celebrate the Teachers Convention and they were all excited to see the bridge that has a view to the waterfalls and the Caroní River. When the teachers started to cross the bridge, the bridge could not resist it and it broke. The teachers fell down the rocky river and many of them died because of the many rocks that the river has. Around 50 people died and some of the bodies have not been found yet.

=== The Girl Eaten by an Anaconda ===
This is the folklore of the park. The people from the city of Ciudad Guayana tell a story of a little girl who was sitting under a tree and an Anaconda that was hanging in the tree ate her. Even though this story is fake, it has made people be more careful with their children. However, there have been Anaconda attacks in the park, and animal control works to keep these snakes out of the park.

== See also ==
- List of waterfalls
