= Carrizal seedeater =

Scientific classification
- Kingdom: Animalia
- Phylum: Chordata
- Class: Aves
- Order: Passeriformes
- Family: Cardinalidae
- Genus: Amaurospiza
- Species: A. carrizalensis

Binomial name
- Amaurospiza carrizalensis Lentino & Restall, 2003

Species of bird

The Carrizal seedeater (Amaurospiza carrizalensis) is a species of bird in the family Cardinalidae, the cardinals or cardinal grosbeaks. It is endemic to Venezuela.

== Taxonomy and systematics ==
The Carrizal seedeater was described based on three specimens collected in 2001. The researchers who determined that it was a new species, Miguel Lentino and Robin L. Restall, named it Carrizal blue seedeater, but the "blue" was dropped by taxonomic organizations to avoid conflict with what was then the blue seedeater (Amaurospiza concolor).

== Description ==
The Carrizal seedeater is 12 cm (4.7 in) long and weighs 12 to 14 g (0.42 to 0.49 oz). The male is a glossy dark slaty blue that is darker on the face and underparts. The female's upperparts are warm brown and the underparts yellow-buff, darker on the flanks.

== Distribution and habitat ==
The specimens of Carrizal seedeater were collected on Isla Carrizal in the Caroni River of northern Venezuela. Construction of the Tocoma Dam, which began in 2006, flooded the island. The species has since been found elsewhere in the Caroni River watershed. It is known only from stands of spiny Guadua and Ripidocladus species of bamboo in deciduous forest.

== Behavior ==
=== Feeding ===
The crops of the Carrizal seedeater specimens contained beetles and vegetable matter.

=== Breeding ===
No information has been published about the Carrizal seedeater's breeding phenology.

=== Vocalization ===
The Carrizal seedeater's song is "a pleasant whistled warble, 'sweet sweet pit-swee pit-swoo'" .

== Status ==
The IUCN has not assessed the Carrizal seedeater. However, researchers consider it Critically Endangered. It is known from fewer than 20 locations across a very small area. "Effective protection of potentially suitable habitat is considered essential if this species is to survive in the future."
