= Ciudad Guayana =

- City
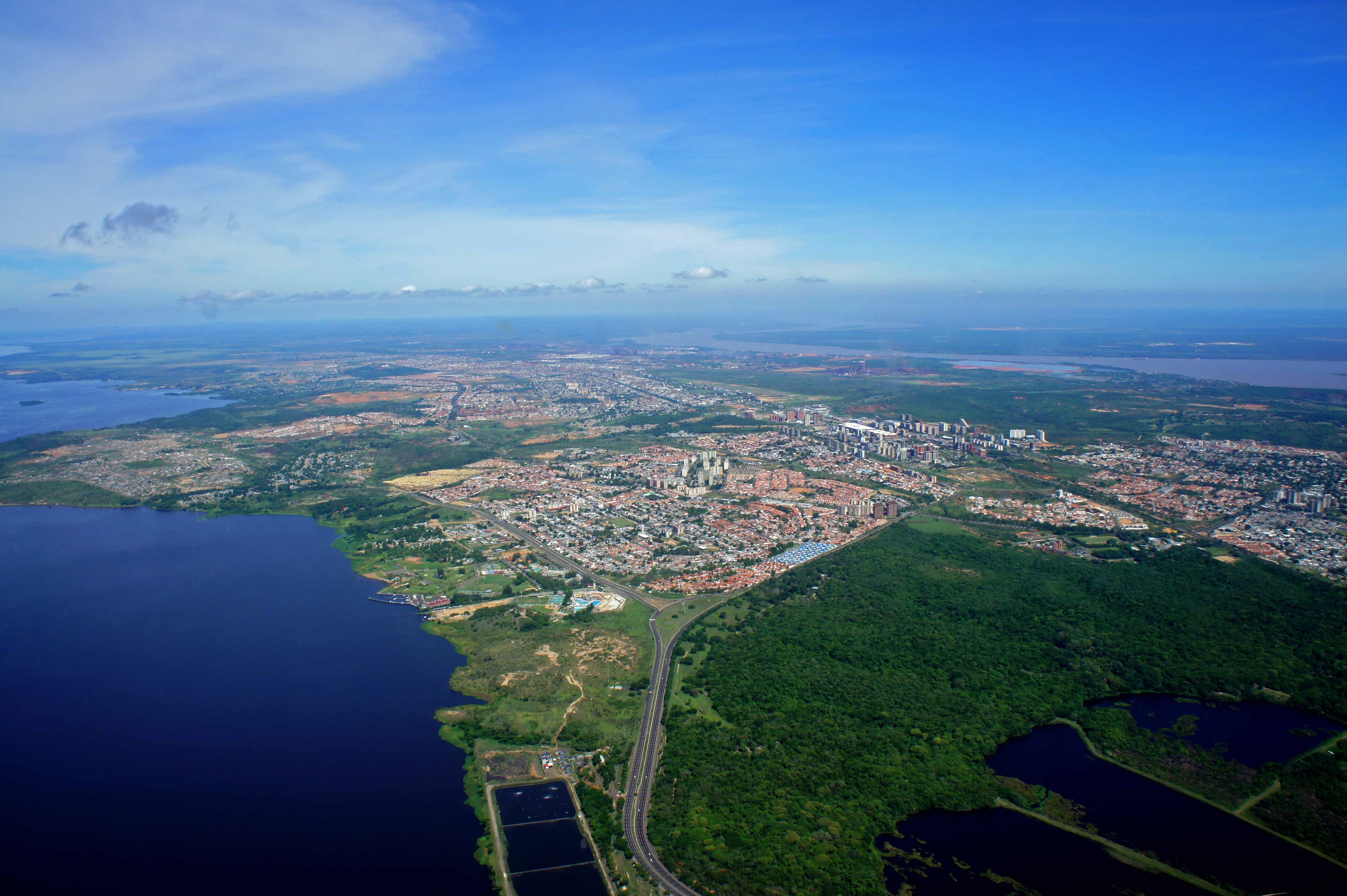
- Aerial view of Ciudad Guayana

- Coat of arms

- Location in Venezuela
- Coordinates: 8°22′N 62°39′W
- Country: Venezuela
- State: Bolívar
- Municipality: Caroní
- Founded: July 2, 1961

Government
  - Mayor: Tito Oviedo

Area
  - Total: 378.59 km^{2} (146.17 sq mi)

Population (2022)
  - Total: 978,202
  - Rank: 6th
  - Density: 2,583.8/km^{2} (6,692.0/sq mi)
  - Demonym: guayanés
- Time zone: UTC−4 (VET)
- Area code: 0286
- Climate: Aw

Ciudad Guayana (Spanish pronunciation: [sjuˈðað ɣwaˈʝana]) (English: Guayana City) is a city in Bolívar State, Venezuela. It stretches 40 kilometers along the south bank of the Orinoco river, at the point where it is joined by its main tributary, the Caroní River. The Caroní flows through the city from south to north, dividing it into its predominant halves — the old town of San Félix, to the east, and the newer area of Puerto Ordaz (Spanish pronunciation: [ˈpweɾto oɾˈðas]), to the west.

Ciudad Guayana was officially founded in 1961 by the unification of two former settlements, but the modern history of San Félix can be traced back to the eighteenth century. Located within the city limits are Cachamay Falls (part of Parque Cachamay) and Llovizna Falls. There are three bridges across the Caroní, and another crossing over the Orinoco, the Orinoquia Bridge, which was inaugurated in 2006. With approximately one million people in the greater metro area, Ciudad Guayana is Venezuela's fastest-growing city with its important iron, steel, aluminum and hydroelectric industries. Additionally, Ciudad Guayana is one of Venezuela's top-five most vital shipping locations (especially for most of the goods produced in Bolívar state), as ships and barges can easily access the port from the Atlantic Ocean via the Orinoco River.

Due to its planned nature, the city has a drastically different feel from many other South American cities. The towers of the Alta Vista district recall Barranquilla, and many of the residential neighborhoods have architecture and landscaping that are similar to suburbs in the United States from the 1950s through 1980s, such as subdivisions and 'cookie-cutter' homes, neatly-paved sidewalks, and manicured, patterned lawns. This is partly due to the presence, in the 1960s and early 1970s, of US Steel, an American company with ironworks operations in the region. US Steel built housing for hundreds of its American immigrant workers and their families, who lived in Puerto Ordaz (and other communities) until the nationalization of the Venezuelan steel industry forced the company and its workers to cease operations.

Ciudad Guayana is located in a strategic spot for the country of Venezuela. Many international visitors have traveled there throughout its history, including Pope John Paul II to several former American presidents, such as G.W. Bush; various musicians, artists, and filmmakers, like Steven Spielberg, have visited.

Ciudad Guayana is served by Manuel Carlos Piar International Airport in Puerto Ordaz.

== History ==
The first explorations of Diego de Ordaz were organized in 1531. An expedition led by Juan González Sosa discovered previously unknown jungles and plains on the banks of the Orinoco River. In 1535, another expedition into the region was led by Lieutenant Alfonso Herrera. It was after the movements of conquest and colonization, when in 1591 Antonio de Berrio founded Santo Tome de Guayana at the confluence of the Caroni and Orinoco, in the country of Carapana near the Indian village of Cachamay.

The city was founded multiple times in different places, due to the continuous attacks of pirates and conquerors which destroyed it as they went down the Orinoco River in search of El Dorado.

In 1618, when he was near the old Guiana, an English expedition sent by Walter Raleigh sacked and destroyed the city entirely. In 1764, the residents were relocated to Angostura, now Ciudad Bolivar, due to the continuous attacks of English and Dutch pirates. The last foundation took place at its original site on July 2, 1961 and was called Ciudad Guayana. West of the city is the Matanzas Industrial Zone, the urban area of Puerto Ordaz in the middle east and San Felix.

For the design and city planning Corporacion Venezolana de Guayana requested the participation of the then Harvard–MIT Joint Center for Urban Studies (USA). The large and extensive program of building highways and avenues, residential areas, schools, hospitals and recreational facilities, continues with the same intensity since its inception, ready to house 2.5 million people in 2020. Since 1961, the city has been known as one of the fastest growing in the world.

Ciudad Guayana and the surrounding site have special interest to visitors. Within the city, the Caroni park consists of Drizzle, Cachamay and Loefling, which are a representative sample of the majesty and beauty of the Rio Caroni. Other amusement park attractions include the Foundation and Paseo Malecon San Felix. For those interested in the basic industries of Venezuela some of these have a visitation schedule that could be found through their respective managements of Public Relations. Nearby, less than 100 kilometers away it is Ciudad Bolívar, the historic site of Bolivar state. On the other side of the river is the Mission of Caroni (Caroni ruins), the Castillos de Guayana and forest plantations.

The Puerto Ordaz area was built and planned by the Companies Orinoco Mining Company and the Venezuelan Corporation of Guayana in the mid-twentieth century.

On November 13, 2006 the Orinoquia Bridge, the second largest in the country, opened. This facilitates communication between Ciudad Guayana and the opposite bank of the Orinoco in Anzoátegui and Monagas states.

== Geography ==
The city is located at the confluence of the Caroní and Orinoco River on a high plain situated approximately 200-300 feet above sea level.

Ciudad Guayana is hot and humid most of the year, having a tropical savanna climate (Köppen: Aw) with a dry season from January to March.

Climate data for Ciudad Guayana
| Month | Jan | Feb | Mar | Apr | May | Jun | Jul | Aug | Sep | Oct | Nov | Dec | Year |
|---|---|---|---|---|---|---|---|---|---|---|---|---|---|
| Record high °C (°F) | 35.5 (95.9) | 36.5 (97.7) | 39.3 (102.7) | 40.4 (104.7) | 38.7 (101.7) | 38.8 (101.8) | 37.6 (99.7) | 37.2 (99.0) | 39.5 (103.1) | 41.0 (105.8) | 39.5 (103.1) | 38.4 (101.1) | 41.0 (105.8) |
| Mean daily maximum °C (°F) | 31.8 (89.2) | 33.1 (91.6) | 34.3 (93.7) | 34.9 (94.8) | 33.6 (92.5) | 31.7 (89.1) | 31.0 (87.8) | 31.8 (89.2) | 32.9 (91.2) | 34.2 (93.6) | 35.4 (95.7) | 33.8 (92.8) | 33.2 (91.8) |
| Mean daily minimum °C (°F) | 22.2 (72.0) | 22.3 (72.1) | 22.9 (73.2) | 23.7 (74.7) | 25.2 (77.4) | 25.5 (77.9) | 26.1 (79.0) | 25.6 (78.1) | 25.9 (78.6) | 25.3 (77.5) | 23.8 (74.8) | 22.6 (72.7) | 24.3 (75.7) |
| Record low °C (°F) | 17.0 (62.6) | 15.2 (59.4) | 15.9 (60.6) | 15.4 (59.7) | 16.3 (61.3) | 17.1 (62.8) | 19.6 (67.3) | 18.1 (64.6) | 17.5 (63.5) | 16.7 (62.1) | 16.2 (61.2) | 15.7 (60.3) | 15.2 (59.4) |
| Average rainfall mm (inches) | 27.9 (1.10) | 17.8 (0.70) | 12.7 (0.50) | 83.8 (3.30) | 243.84 (9.60) | 305.8 (12.04) | 210.2 (8.28) | 162.6 (6.40) | 132.1 (5.20) | 73.6 (2.90) | 78.7 (3.10) | 53.3 (2.10) | 1,402.34 (55.22) |
| Average relative humidity (%) | 77.4 | 74.6 | 72.8 | 74.5 | 78.8 | 81.2 | 80.4 | 78.1 | 76.0 | 75.9 | 74.6 | 75.7 | 76.7 |
Source: Instituto Nacional de Meteorología e Hidrología (INAMEH)

== Economy ==
Many of Venezuela's prime industries are based in Puerto Ordaz. These include Alcasa, Venalum, Bauxilum, Carbonorca (primary aluminium manufacturers and anode suppliers for the aluminium industry), Ferrominera (iron ore processing), and SIDOR (Orinoco Steelmaking). The country's main electricity producer, Corpoelec, and the regional development office, CVG (Corporación Venezolana de Guayana), are also located in Puerto Ordaz.

=== Port ===
The port of Puerto Ordaz is a combination of piers (muelles), all under the control of CVG, of which only one is allocated for public use. The others are directly related to the CVG production companies; primarily all for aluminum-related endeavors, nine in-total. Two of the most frequently-used piers are Ferrominera (at the mouth of the Caroní river) and Ternium Sidor (recently nationalised into a CVG company, and the only steel works) at mile 197.

=== Hydroelectricity ===
The city hosts the headquarters of CVG Electrificación del Caroní (CVG Edelca), Venezuela's main electricity producer, which manage several hydroelectric power plants along the Caroní river basin. Two of them, Macagua and Caruachi, are located within city limits. The easy of access to Macagua from the city center makes it a tourist and educational destination, and a public park and museum were added to the complex.

Edelca also builds and administers two more dams upstream from the city: Tocoma and Guri. The latter is currently (as of 2018) the fourth-biggest hydroelectric power station in the world in terms of generation capacity, and gave origin to the Guri reservoir, the second biggest lake in Venezuela.

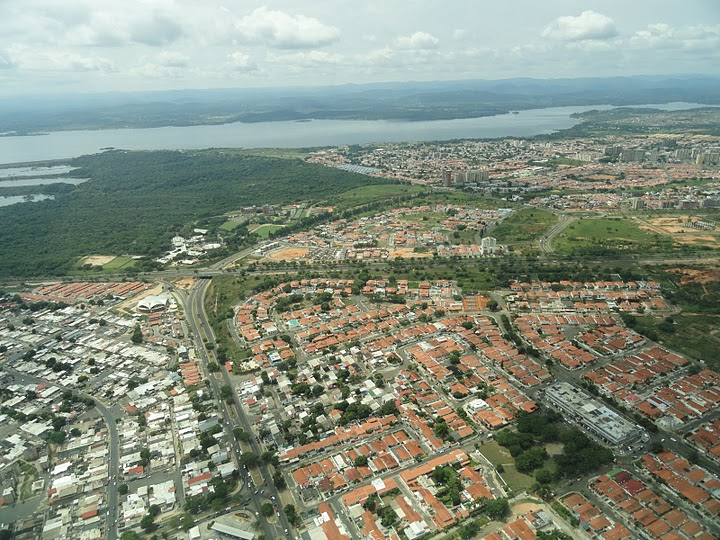
Puerto Ordaz City view from sky

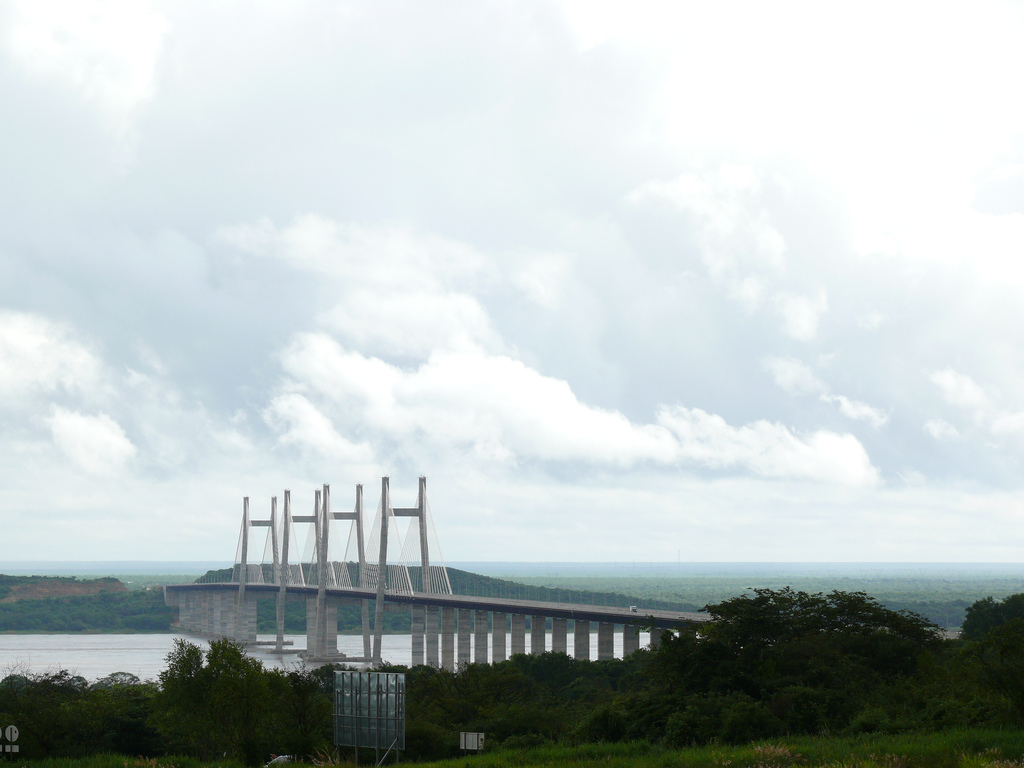
Orinokia bridge

== Transportation ==
Puerto Ordaz is criss-crossed from north to south and east to west by numerous avenues. Some of them are:

- Guayana Avenue — the main thoroughfare of the city, it crosses the city from start to end. It begins at the toll on the Ciudad Bolívar-Ciudad Guayana Highway and goes all the way through Puerto Ordaz, including the industrial zones, airport, commercial zones, residential areas, and Parque Cachamay.
- Atlántico Avenue runs through Puerto Ordaz from west to east on the south side of the city. It intersects with Las Americas Avenue and Leopoldo Sucre Figarella Ave. This gives a high importance to this thoroughfare.
- Las Américas Avenue connects the Altavista sector (north of the city) with the city centre.
- Paseo Caroní Avenue starts on the west side of the city and ends at Atlántico Avenue.

On December 3, 2006, the Orinoquia Bridge, which crosses the Orinoco river, was inaugurated.

The area is served by Manuel Carlos Piar Guayana Airport.

== Recreation ==
In Puerto Ordaz the principal recreation centers are:

- Natural: Llovizna park, Cachamay park, Loefling park.
- Shopping centers: Orinokia Mall, Altavista Mall, Atlántico Mall.
- Family: Macagua Eco Museum, Christmas Park and the Italian-Venezuelan Club.

Ciudad Guayana is home to two football clubs that play in the Venezuelan Primera División, namely LALA FC and Mineros de Guayana. Both clubs play their home games in the CTE Cachamay stadium, which also hosts games of the national team and numerous concerts.

== Notable people ==
- Kervin Andrade (born 2005), Venezuelan footballer
- Eugenio Suárez (born 1991), Major League Baseball player
- Freddy Fermin (born 1995), Major League Baseball player
- Lenyn Sosa (born 2000), Major League Baseball player

== Education ==
Puerto Ordaz is also well known for having one of the best engineering schools in Latin America. The main universities are:

Regional hubs:

- Andrés Bello UCAB (Catholic University)
- UDO (East University)
- Gran Mariscal de Ayacucho (UGMA) University
- Bicentenaria de Aragua (UBA) University

Puerto Ordaz is headquarters of colleges like:

- UNEXPO (National Experimental Polytechnic University)
- UNEG (National Experimental University of Guayana)

Technical Institutes

- U.E.E.T.I. Fundación "La Salle" (San Félix)
- I.U.T. Antonio José de Sucre
- I.U.T. Pedro Emilio Coll
- I.U.P. Santiago Mariño

== Tourism ==
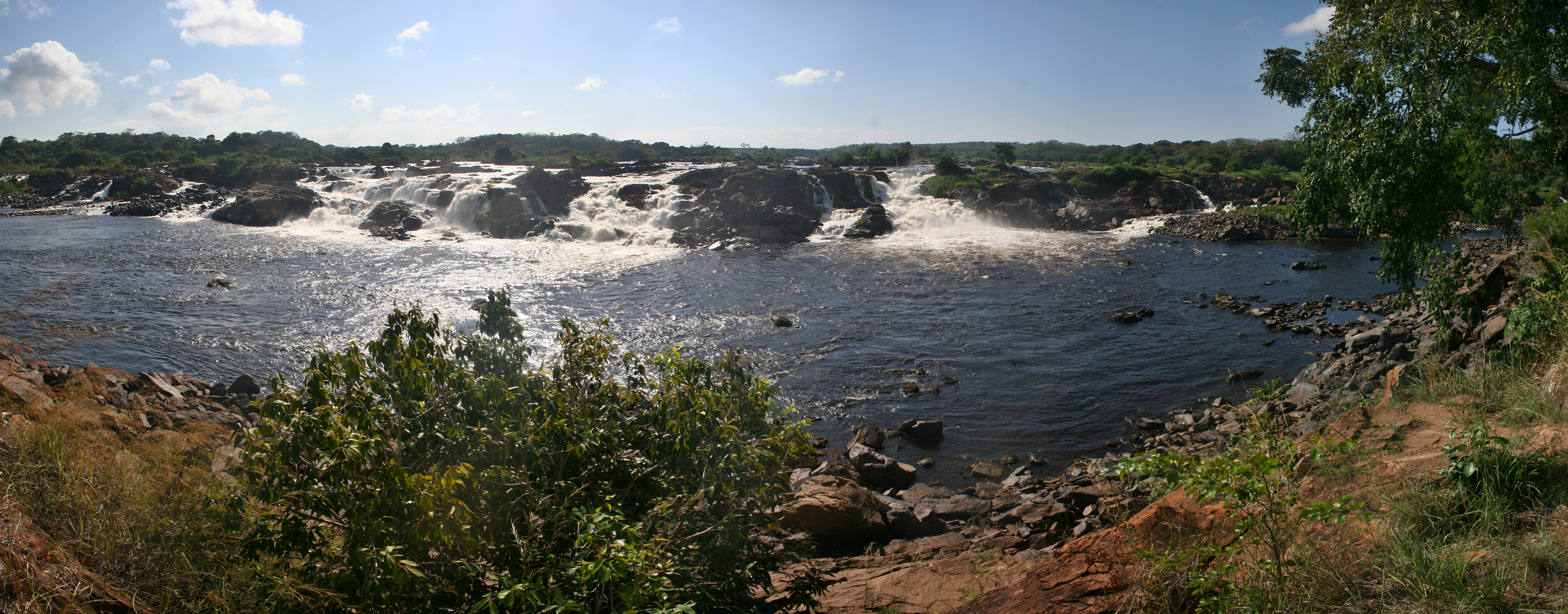
The Cachamay falls of the Caroní River

Inside the city both the Llovizna and Cachamay Parks are located displaying their picturesque waterfalls. Other local attractions are the Caroní Ecomuseum located at the Macagua Dam. Near the city from the Angosturita bridge to the San Félix port the union of the Caroní and Orinoco rivers can be seen; the different colors of the water of both rivers make a very distinct demarcation line. Taking Puerto Ordaz as a starting point, the Orinoco Delta can be visited as well as Canaima's National Park and Guri's reservoirs. Other points of interest are the colonial castles at the Orinoco riverside and the "Cerro del Elefante" (Elephant's hill) which can be reached in a 4x4 vehicle. The Castles of Guayana are located at the right side of the Orinoco River, about 35 kilometers from San Félix.

== Gallery ==
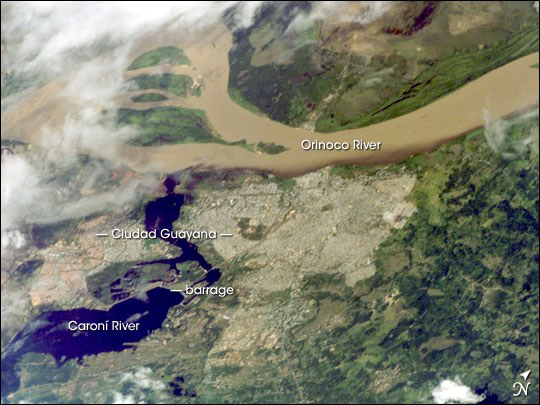
Guayana City from space

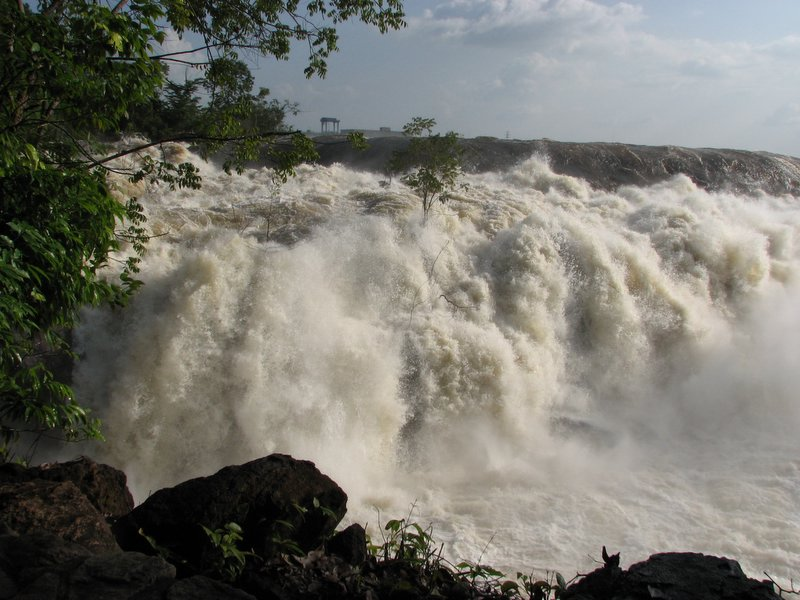
La Llovizna Falls

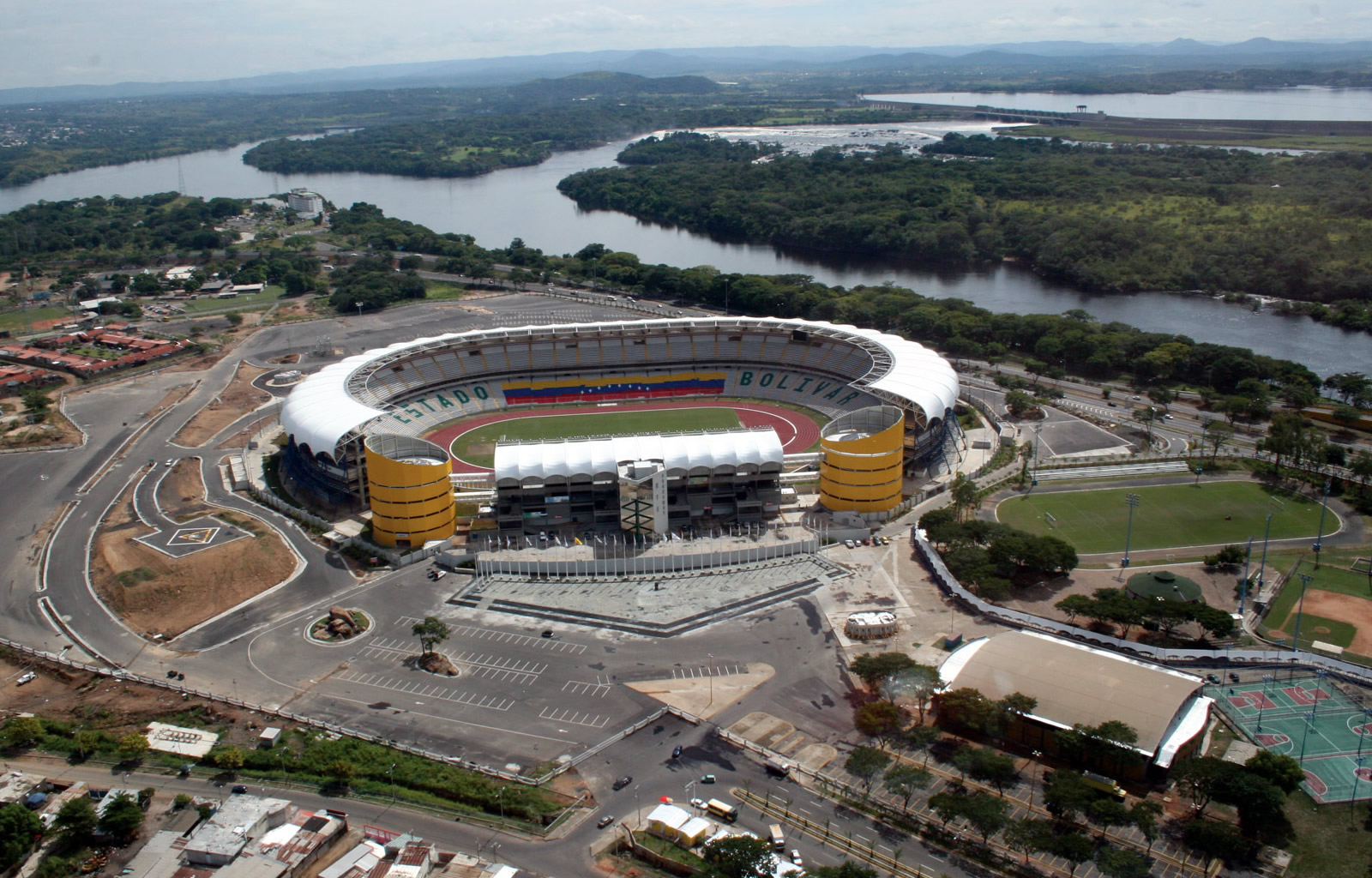
Football stadium Polideportivo Cachamay

== See also ==
- List of cities in Venezuela
- Railway stations in Venezuela
