= Trans Caribbean =

Trans Caribbean can refer to:

- Trans Caribbean Airways
- Trans-Caribbean pipeline
