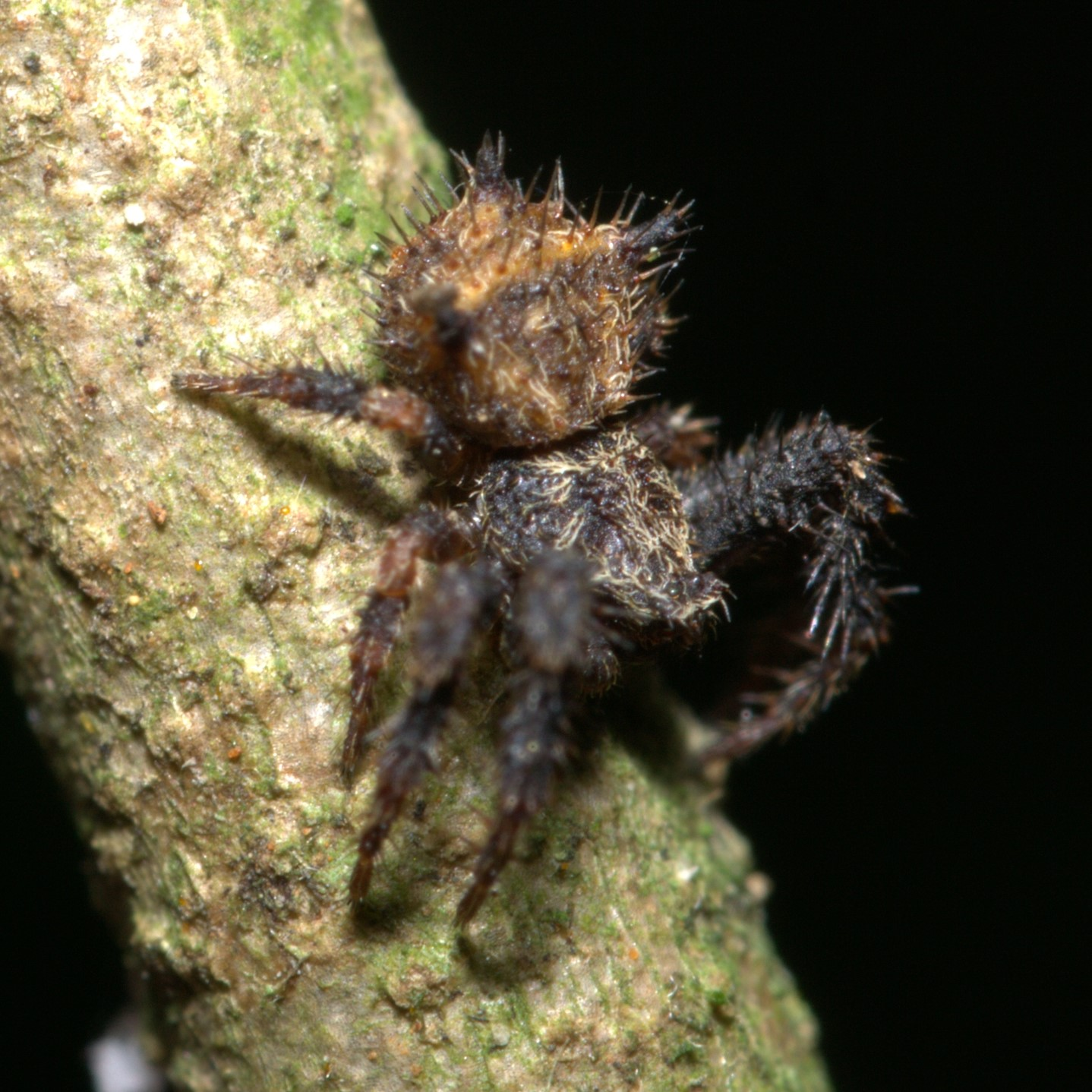
- Epicadinus villosus

Scientific classification
- Kingdom: Animalia
- Phylum: Arthropoda
- Subphylum: Chelicerata
- Class: Arachnida
- Order: Araneae
- Infraorder: Araneomorphae
- Family: Thomisidae
- Genus: Epicadinus; Simon, 1895

Type species
- E. trispinosus (Taczanowski, 1872)

Species
- 4, see text

= Epicadinus =

Genus of spiders

Epicadinus is a genus of crab spiders that was first described by Eugène Louis Simon in 1895.

== Species ==
As of September 2020 it contains four species found from Mexico to Brazil:

- Epicadinus biocellatus Mello-Leitão, 1929 – Brazil
- Epicadinus spinipes (Blackwall, 1862) – Brazil
- Epicadinus trispinosus (Taczanowski, 1872) (type) – Mexico, Panama, Ecuador, Peru, Bolivia, Trinidad and Tobago, French Guiana, Brazil
- Epicadinus villosus Mello-Leitão, 1929 – Brazil, Paraguay, Uruguay, Argentina

Formerly included:

- E. tuberculatus Petrunkevitch, 1910 (Transferred to Epicadus)

In synonymy:

- E. albimaculatus Mello-Leitão, 1929 = Epicadinus spinipes (Blackwall, 1862)
- E. cornutus (Taczanowski, 1872) = Epicadinus trispinosus (Taczanowski, 1872)
- E. gavensis Soares, 1946 = Epicadinus spinipes (Blackwall, 1862)
- E. helenae Piza, 1936 = Epicadinus villosus Mello-Leitão, 1929
- E. marmoratus Mello-Leitão, 1947 = Epicadinus villosus Mello-Leitão, 1929
- E. trifidus (O. Pickard-Cambridge, 1893) = Epicadinus trispinosus (Taczanowski, 1872)

== See also ==
- List of Thomisidae species
