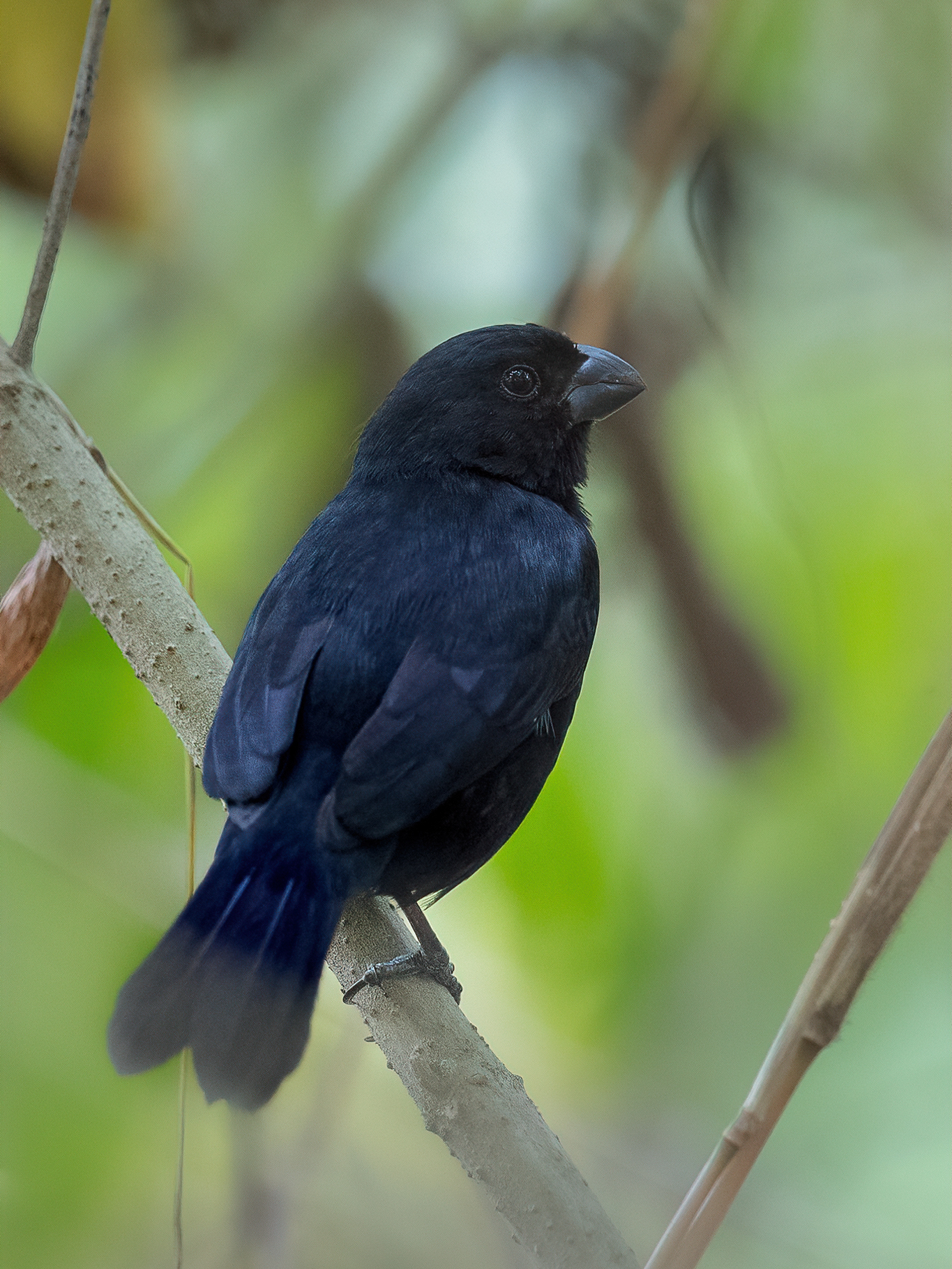

Scientific classification
- Kingdom: Animalia
- Phylum: Chordata
- Class: Aves
- Order: Passeriformes
- Family: Cardinalidae
- Genus: Amaurospiza
- Species: A. concolor

Binomial name
- Amaurospiza concolor Cabanis, 1861

= Blue seedeater =

Species of bird

The blue seedeater (Amaurospiza concolor) or Cabanis's seedeater is a species of bird in the cardinal family that is found in southern Mexico and Central America. The Ecuadorian seedeater (Amaurospiza aequatorialis) was formerly considered a subspecies of the blue seedeater.

== Taxonomy and systematics ==
The blue seedeater was formally described in 1861 by the German ornithologist Jean Cabanis based on a specimen that had been collected in Costa Rica. Cabanis placed the species in a new genus Amaurospiza and coined the binomial name Amaurospiza concolor. The specific epithet is Latin meaning "uniform", "similar in colour" or "plain".

The blue seedeater was formerly considered to be conspecific with the Ecuadorian seedeater. Most authorities now treat the Ecuadorian seedeateras a separate species. This is based largely on the results of molecular phylogenetic studies that were published in 2014 and 2023. Confusingly, as of January 2024, BirdLife International uses the scientific name A. moesta for blue seedeater. The BirdLife account encompasses what are now the blue, Ecuadorian, and blackish-blue seedeaters.

Two subspecies are recognised:

- A. c. relicta (Griscom, 1934) – southwest Mexico
- A. c. concolor Cabanis, 1861 – south Mexico, Belize, Honduras to Panama

== Description ==
The blue seedeater is 11.5 to 14 cm (4.5 to 5.5 in) long and weighs 12 to 15 g (0.42 to 0.53 oz). The nominate male is entirely slate blue. The female's upperparts are cinnamon and the underparts tawny. The male A. c. relicta is more slaty (less blue) than the nominate and has black lores; the female is a paler cinnamon.

The songs and calls have been transcribed in several ways. A song from Chiapas, Mexico, is . One from Panama is . A call from Puebla, Mexico, is and one from Panama is .

== Distribution and habitat ==
The nominate blue seedeater is found from Chiapas in southern Mexico through Central America to western and central Panama. A. c. relicta is found in six southwestern Mexico states, Jalisco, Colima, Morelos, Puebla, Guerrero and Oaxaca. The species inhabits openings in and edges of humid montane and secondary forest. It most often is found at sites with bamboo. In northern Central America it ranges in elevation from 600 to 2,500 m (2,000 to 8,200 ft) but in Costa Rica inhabits the narrower range of 1,700 to 2,200 m (5,600 to 7,200 ft).

== Behavior ==
=== Feeding ===
The blue seedeater's diet includes insects, seeds, and bamboo shoots.

=== Breeding ===
The only known blue seedeater nest was found in Mexico. It was a cup of coarse grass lined with finer grass placed in the fork of a slender branch. It contained two seedeater eggs and one of the brood parasite bronzed cowbird (Molothrus aeneus).

== Status ==
The IUCN has not assessed the blue seedeater.
