= Caruachi Dam =

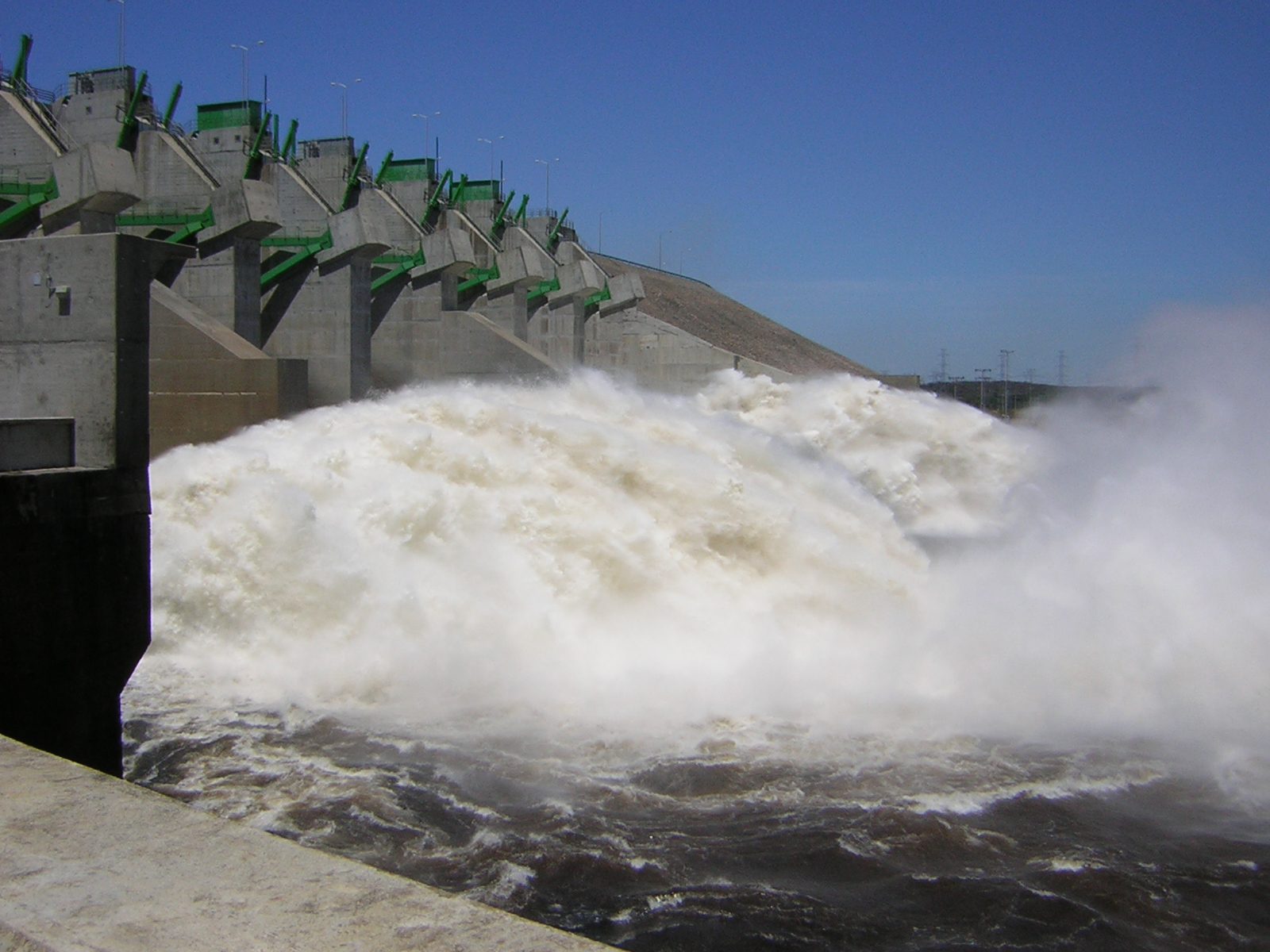

- Location of the dam in Venezuela
- Interactive map of Caruachi Dam
- Country: Venezuela
- Location: Bolívar
- Coordinates: 08°09′36″N 62°47′55″W
- Purpose: Power
- Status: Operational
- Construction began: 1998
- Opening date: 31 March 2006
- Construction cost: US$2.1 billion
- Owner: CVG Electrification del Caroni CA

Dam and spillways
- Type of dam: Gravity dam; with an embankment
- Impounds: Caroni River
- Height: 55 m (180 ft)
- Length: 5,728 m (18,793 ft)
- Dam volume: 11×10^{6} m^{3} (390×10^{6} cu ft)
- Spillway type: Service, gate-controlled
- Spillway capacity: 30×10^{3} m^{3}/s (1.1×10^{6} cu ft/s)

Reservoir
- Creates: Caruachi Reservoir
- Total capacity: 3,520 GL (2,850,000 acre⋅ft)
- Surface area: 238 km^{2} (92 sq mi)
- Normal elevation: 91.5 m (300 ft) AMSL

Caruachi hydroelectric plant (Spanish: Central Hidroeléctrica Caruachi)
- Coordinates: 8°09′39″N 62°48′00″W
- Operator: Corporación Eléctrica Nacional
- Commission date: 2003-2010
- Type: Conventional
- Turbines: 12 × 180 MW (240,000 hp) (all Kaplan-type)
- Installed capacity: 2,160 MW (2,900,000 hp)
- Annual generation: 12,000 GWh (43,000 TJ)

The Caruachi Dam is a concrete gravity dam across the Caroní River in Bolivar state, Venezuela. It supports a conventional hydroelectric power facility with 2,160 megawatts (2.90×10^{6} hp) of capacity. The dam is approximately 59 kilometres (37 mi) downstream from the Guri Dam belonging to the Central Hidroeléctrica Simón Bolívar, and approximately 35 kilometres (22 mi) from where the Caroni and Orinoco rivers meet at Ciudad Guayana.

== The hydroelectric plant ==
The Caruachi hydroelectric plant (Spanish: Central Hidroeléctrica Caruachi) was initially fitted with 180-megawatt (240,000 hp) Kaplan turbine-generators that General Electric supplied for the project and were commissioned in April 2003. The twelfth and final unit entered service on February 28, 2006, and entered into formal/fully commercial operation on 31 March 2006, when the project was officially inaugurated.

The total installed capacity is 2,160 megawatts (2,900,000 hp) and the power plant produces approximately 12 terawatt-hours (43 PJ) annually.

This project is formed jointly with the Central Hidroeléctrica Simón Bolívar in Guri, Antonio José de Sucre in Macagua and Manuel Piar in Tocoma (under construction), the development of Lower Caroní River hydroelectric resources and one of the world's largest hydro projects now in construction, that, when completed, EDELCA (Electrificación del Caroní CA) claims will save Venezuela the equivalent of 750,000 barrels of oil per day, compared to 300,000 currently.

=== Design and construction ===
The contract for the design, supply and installation of the main electro-mechanical equipment was awarded to a consortium of Kvaerner of Norway, GE Energy of the US, and Elin Transformatoren GmbH of Austria. Major work began on the project in 1998.

Following GE's acquisition of Kvaerner's hydro business in 1999, over 90% of the Caruachi contract was carried out by GE Hydro, including all aspects of the design, supply and installation of the turbines, generators, governors, exciters and cranes. A total of 12 Kaplan turbine-generator units, each capable of a power output of 180 MW, were supplied to the project.

ABB of Switzerland won three contracts to provide the power transmission system for the project. A 400 kV substation and four related 400 kV transmission lines connect the plant with the country's transmission network.

Alstom Power was awarded the contract for distributed control system and SCADA, and small electrical auxiliaries like UPS equipments and DC distribution boards.

The original GE Hydro and Elin contracts were, through several mergers and acquisitions, transferred to the 2005-created Andritz Hydro of Austria. While the original Alstom contract was in 2014 inherited by a new GE Renewable Energy entity.

== Features ==
A main concrete 360 metres (1,180 ft) gravity dam has a maximum height of 55 metres (180 ft) from its foundations, with an integrated intake structure and powerhouse. A 900-metre (3,000 ft) right-abutment rockfill closure dam has a concrete slab face and a maximum height of 50 metres (160 ft), and a 4,200-metre (13,800 ft) left-abutment earth and rockfill closure dam has a maximum height of 45 metres (148 ft). A spillway with nine spans and radial surface gates has an aggregate 30,000 cubic metres per second (1,100,000 cu ft/s) flow capacity.

A 470-metre (1,540 ft) powerhouse is integrated with the main dam with space for 12 generating units (360 metres (1,180 ft)) and an assembly bay of 110 metres (360 ft).

Two transition dams have a 50-metre (160 ft) intermediate buttress between the powerhouse and spillway. The 238-square-kilometre (92 sq mi) reservoir has a normal operating elevation of 91.5 metres (300 ft) above sea level.

== See also ==
- List of conventional hydroelectric power stations
