= Eastern Caribbean Gas Pipeline =

Roposed natural gas pipeline from Tobago to other eastern Caribbean islands

The Eastern Caribbean Gas Pipeline is a proposed natural gas pipeline from Tobago to other eastern Caribbean islands.

== History ==
The idea had its genesis with Patrick Manning, Prime Minister of Trinidad and Tobago, who announced in 2002 that his country was going to undertake one of the largest civil engineering projects in the Caribbean region.

The project suffered a brief setback when Venezuelan leader Hugo Chavez petitioned intensely that the pipeline should instead originate from Venezuela and reach further into the north, including Cuba and the United States.

In March 2010 the Barbados indicated after a two-year hiatus that it would seek to move toward the negotiations stage for the first stage of the pipeline from Tobago to Barbados.

== Network ==
The overall pipeline would be 596 miles (959 km) long, including shore approaches and the lateral line to Barbados. The first 177-mile (285 km) long stage would start from the Cove Point Estate in Tobago and run to Barbados. The second stage it would be expanded to Saint Lucia, Dominica, Martinique, and Guadeloupe.

== Project company ==
The project is developed by the Eastern Caribbean Gas Pipeline Company Limited (ECGPC). 60% of the company is jointly owned by the United States companies Beowulf Energy LLC and First Reserve Energy International Fund. Rest is owned by the Trinidad and Tobago companies Guardian Holdings (15%), Unit Trust Corporation (15%), and the National Gas Company of Trinidad and Tobago (10%).

== See also ==
- Puerto Rico – Virgin Islands pipeline
- Trans-Caribbean pipeline
