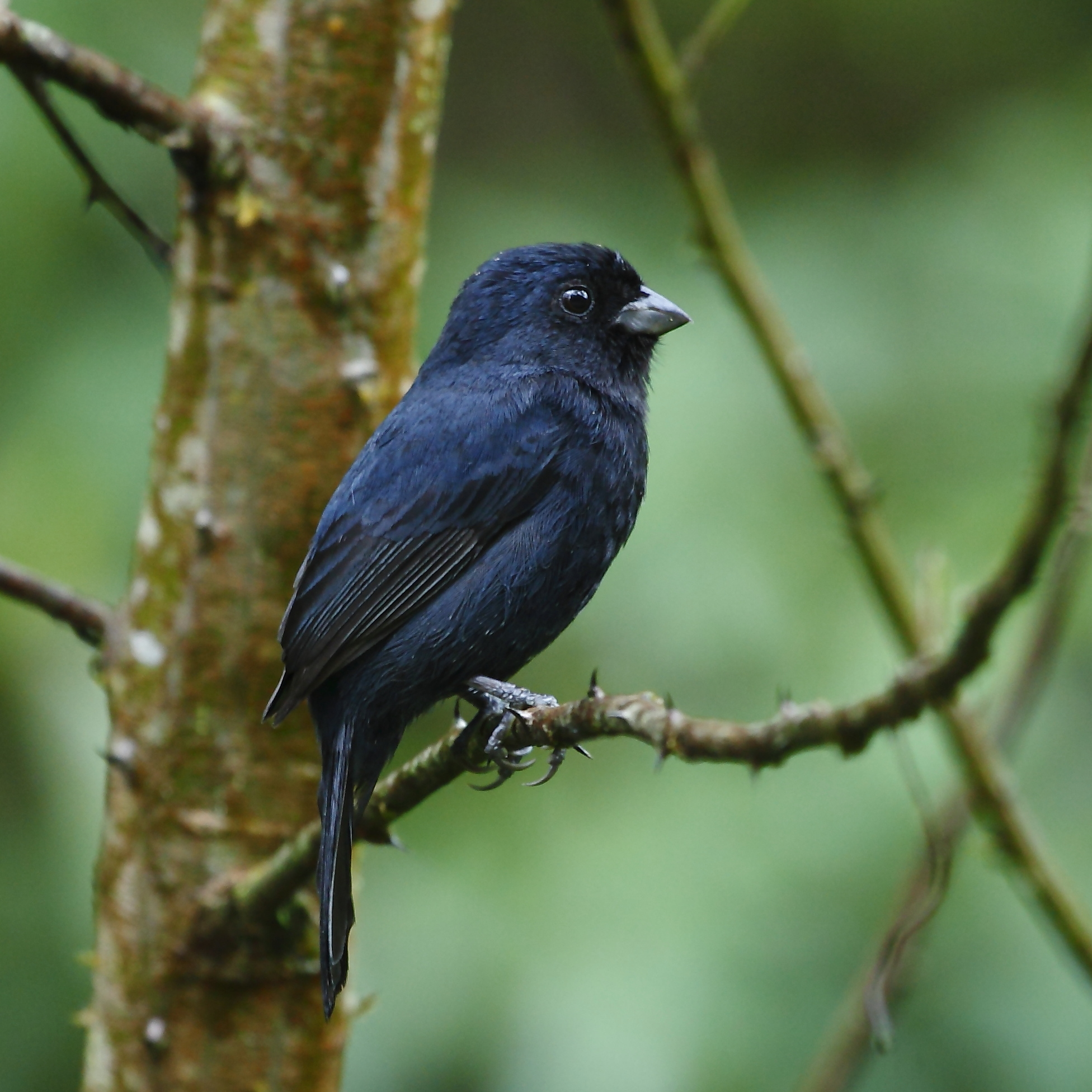
- A male blackish-blue seedeater at São Luiz do Paraitinga, São Paulo state, Brazil.

Scientific classification
- Kingdom: Animalia
- Phylum: Chordata
- Class: Aves
- Order: Passeriformes
- Family: Cardinalidae
- Genus: Amaurospiza
- Species: A. moesta

Binomial name
- Amaurospiza moesta (Hartlaub, 1853)

= Blackish-blue seedeater =

Species of bird

The blackish-blue seedeater (Amaurospiza moesta) is a species of bird in the family Cardinalidae, the cardinals or cardinal grosbeaks. It is found in Argentina, Brazil, and Paraguay.

== Taxonomy and systematics ==
The blackish-blue seedeater is monotypic.

It and the other members of genus Amaurospiza were traditionally placed in family Emberizidae. (At that time, the family included the New World sparrows, which are now in their own family Passerellidae.) Since approximately 2008 they have been placed in their current family.

== Description ==
The blackish-blue seedeater is 12 to 12.5 cm (4.7 to 4.9 in) long and weighs 12.5 to 14 g (0.44 to 0.49 oz). The male is entirely dark slaty blue that is darker on the face and underparts. The female is tawny brown, with the underparts paler than the upperparts.

== Distribution and habitat ==
The blackish-blue seedeater is primarily found in southeastern Brazil and adjoining eastern Paraguay and northeastern Argentina. However, there are also scattered records further north in Brazil. It inhabits the undergrowth and edges of woodland and is especially partial to Chusquea and Guadua bamboo. In elevation it ranges from sea level to 1,600 m (5,200 ft).

== Behavior ==
=== Feeding ===
The blackish-blue seedeater's diet is primarily bamboo seeds, and it probably eats other seeds and insects as well. It forages singly or in pairs from the ground up to about 3 m (9.8 ft) above it.

=== Breeding ===
Blackish-blue seedeaters in breeding condition or adults feeding young have been observed in April, August, September, November, and December. This suggests that breeding may not be seasonal but relies on the availability of bamboo seed.

=== Vocalization ===
The blackish-blue seedeater's song is "a pleasant warble" and its calls sound like "psit" or "pix".

== Status ==
The IUCN has not assessed the blackish-blue seedeater. However, "[It has] been suggested that this species’ population is in gradual decline owing to continuing habitat degradation and loss."
