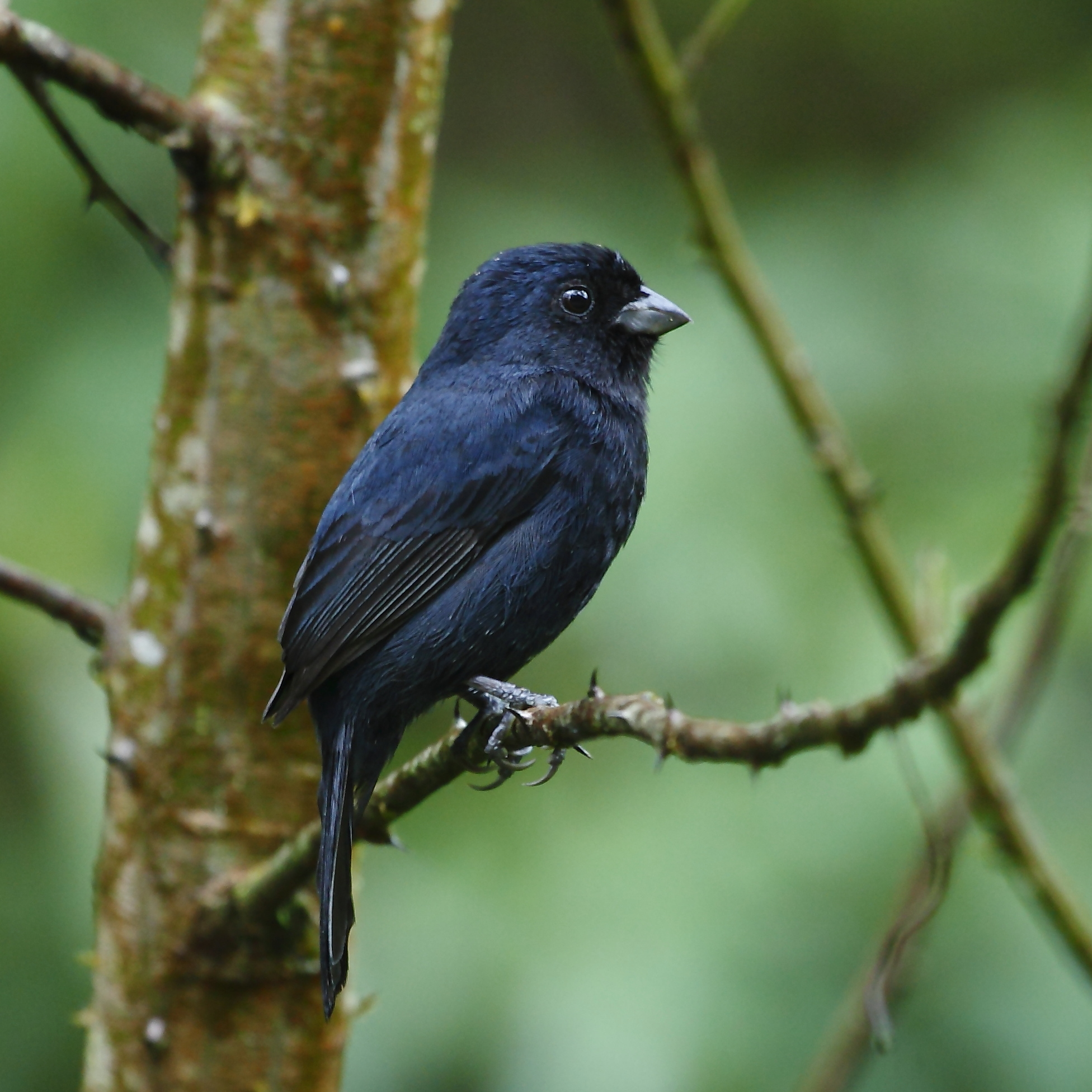
- Blackish-blue seedeater (Amaurospiza moesta)

Scientific classification
- Kingdom: Animalia
- Phylum: Chordata
- Class: Aves
- Order: Passeriformes
- Family: Cardinalidae
- Genus: Amaurospiza; Cabanis, 1861

Type species
- Amaurospiza concolor Cabanis, 1861

Species
- See text

= Amaurospiza =

Genus of birds

Amaurospiza is a genus of seed-eating birds in the cardinal family Cardinalidae that are found in Central and South America.

These blue seedeaters are allopatrically distributed and show only small differences in plumage coloration and body measurements. They are sexually dimorphic in plumage: the male is slaty blue while the female is tawny brown. They favour bamboo thickets where they feed on buds, shoots and insects.

== Taxonomy and species list ==
The genus Amaurospiza was introduced by the German ornithologist Jean Cabanis in 1861 with Cabanis's seedeater as the type species. The name is derived from the Ancient Greek amauros, meaning "dusky", and σπίζα (spíza), a catch-all term for finch-like birds.

This genus was formerly included in the tanager family Thraupidae. It was moved to the cardinal family Cardinalidae based on a molecular phylogenetic study published in 2007.

The following cladogram shows the phylogenetic relationships within the genus as determined by Juan Areta and collaborators in 2023.

- Amaurospiza
  - Blue seedeater (Amaurospiza concolor)
  - - Ecuadorian seedeater (Amaurospiza aequatorialis)
    - - Blackish-blue seedeater (Amaurospiza moesta)
      - Carrizal seedeater (Amaurospiza carrizalensis)

=== Extant Species ===
The following table lists the four species in the genus with their distribution.

Genus Amaurospiza – Cabanis, 1861 – four species
Common name	Scientific name and subspecies	Range	Size and ecology	IUCN status and estimated population
Blue seedeater	Amaurospiza concolor (Cabanis, 1861) Two subspecies: A. c. relicta (Griscom, 1934); A. c. concolor Cabanis, 1861	southern Mexico and Central America	Size: Habitat: Diet:	LC
Ecuadorian seedeater	Amaurospiza aequatorialis Sharpe, 1888	southwest Colombia through Ecuador to northern Peru	Size: Habitat: Diet:	LC
Blackish-blue seedeater	Amaurospiza moesta (Hartlaub, 1853)	Argentina, Brazil, and Paraguay	Size: Habitat: Diet:	LC
Carrizal seedeater	Amaurospiza carrizalensis Lentino & Restall, 2003	northern Venezuela	Size: Habitat: Diet:	LC
