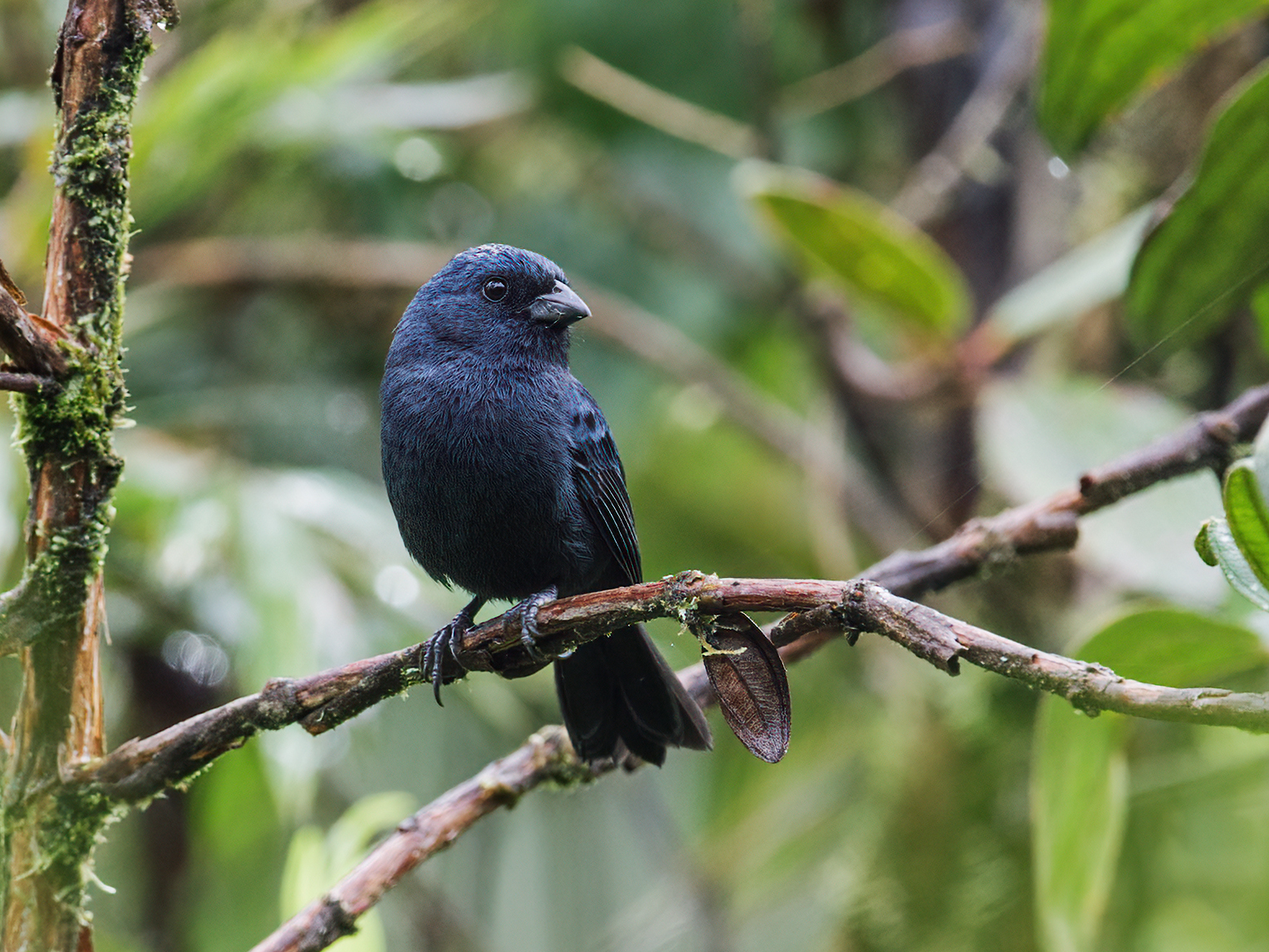

Scientific classification
- Kingdom: Animalia
- Phylum: Chordata
- Class: Aves
- Order: Passeriformes
- Family: Cardinalidae
- Genus: Amaurospiza
- Species: A. aequatorialis

Binomial name
- Amaurospiza aequatorialis Sharpe, 1888

= Ecuadorian seedeater =

Species of bird

The Ecuadorian seedeater (Amaurospiza aequatorialis) is a species of bird in the cardinal family Cardinalidae that the International Ornithological Committee (IOC) accepted as a species in 2015. (But see the taxonomy section below.) It is found in the Andes in southwestern Colombia through Ecuador to northern Peru.

== Taxonomy and systematics ==
The Ecuadorian seedeater was formally described in 1888 by the English ornithologist Richard Bowdler Sharpe based on specimens collected in Ecuador. He coined the binomial name Amaurospiza aequatorialis. The specific epithet is Late Latin for "equatorial", a name commonly used for species from Ecuador, ecuador means "equator" in Spanish.

In 2015 the IOC split the subspecies Amaurospiza concolor aequatorialis from the blue seedeater (Amaurospiza concolor sensu lato) as the Ecuadorian seedeater (Amaurospiza aequatorialis) and renamed A. concolor Cabanis's seedeater. The decision was based on a molecular phylogenetic study published in 2014. However, the South American Classification Committee of the American Ornithological Society (AOS) had previously rejected the split, and as of May 2021 the AOS North American Committee has not considered it and the Clements taxonomy has not adopted it. Confusingly, BirdLife International uses the scientific name A. moesta for blue seedeater, but the IOC, AOS, and Clements assign that binomial to blackish-blue seedeater. The BirdLife account encompasses what are now Cabanis's, Ecuadorian, and blackish-blue seedeaters.

The Ecuadorian seedeater is monotypic.

== Description ==
The male Ecuadorian seedeater is mostly a pale slate blue; its crown is a lighter indigo. The female's upperparts are cinnamon and the underparts tawny.

== Distribution and habitat ==
The Ecuadorian seedeater is found on the west slope of the Andes from southwestern Colombia's Nariño Department through western and central Ecuador into northern Peru, perhaps as far south as the Department of Piura. It inhabits openings in and edges of humid montane and secondary forest and is closely associated with bamboo. In elevation it ranges mostly from 1,100 to 2,300 m (3,600 to 7,500 ft) and locally as low as 800 m (2,600 ft).

== Behavior ==
=== Feeding ===
The Ecuadorian seedeater's diet includes insects, seeds, and bamboo shoots.

=== Breeding ===
No information about the Ecuadorian seedeater' breeding phenology has been published.

=== Vocalization ===
An example of the Ecuadorian seedeater's song is . Its call is .

== Status ==
The IUCN has not assessed the Ecuadorian seedeater.
