= Rejanellus =

Scientific classification
- Domain: Eukaryota
- Kingdom: Animalia
- Phylum: Arthropoda
- Subphylum: Chelicerata
- Class: Arachnida
- Order: Araneae
- Infraorder: Araneomorphae
- Family: Thomisidae
- Genus: Rejanellus; Lise

Type species
- Rejanellus venustus

Species
- Rejanellus granulatus (Bryant, 1940); Rejanellus mutchleri (Petrunkevitch, 1930); Rejanellus pallescens (Bryant, 1940); Rejanellus venustus (Bryant, 1948)

Genus of spiders

Rejanellus is a genus of spiders in the family Thomisidae. It was first described in 2005 by Lise. As of 2017, it contains 4 species.
