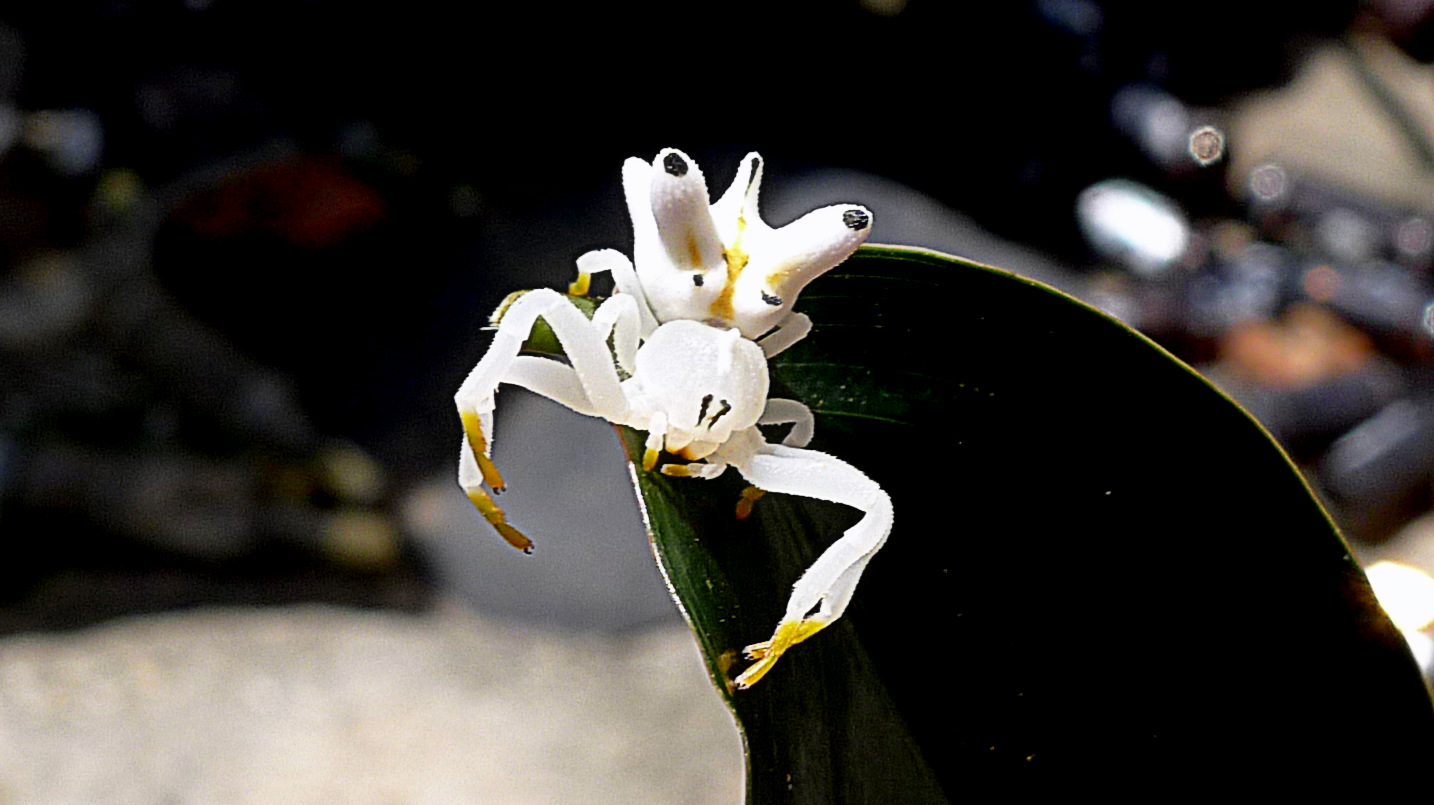
- E. heterogaster

Scientific classification
- Kingdom: Animalia
- Phylum: Arthropoda
- Subphylum: Chelicerata
- Class: Arachnida
- Order: Araneae
- Infraorder: Araneomorphae
- Family: Thomisidae
- Genus: Epicadus; Simon, 1895

Type species
- E. heterogaster (Guérin, 1829)

Species
- 11, see text

Synonyms
- Tobias Simon, 1895

= Epicadus =

Genus of spiders

Epicadus is a genus of crab spiders that was first described by Eugène Louis Simon in 1895. It is considered a senior synonym of Tobias.

== Species ==
As of December 2021 it contains eleven species, found in South and Central America:

- Epicadus camelinus (O. Pickard-Cambridge, 1869) – Peru, Bolivia, Brazil
- Epicadus dimidiaster Machado, Teixeira & Lise, 2018 – Colombia, Peru, Brazil
- Epicadus granulatus Banks, 1909 – Costa Rica, Peru, Brazil
- Epicadus heterogaster (Guérin, 1829) (type) – Costa Rica, Panama, Colombia, Venezuela, Guyana, Ecuador, Peru, Bolivia, Brazil, Paraguay, Argentina
- Epicadus pulcher (Mello-Leitão, 1929) – Bolivia, Brazil
- Epicadus rubripes Mello-Leitão, 1924 – Brazil
- Epicadus stelloides (Walckenaer, 1837) – Puerto Rico, Virgin Is., Venezuela, Brazil
- Epicadus taczanowskii (Roewer, 1951) – Hispaniola, Costa Rica, Panama to Peru, Bolivia, Brazil
- Epicadus tigrinus Machado, Teixeira & Lise, 2018 – Costa Rica, Panama
- Epicadus trituberculatus (Taczanowski, 1872) – Mexico, Panama, Peru, Bolivia, French Guiana, Brazil, Argentina
- Epicadus tuberculatus (Petrunkevitch, 1910) – Panama, Ecuador, Peru, Brazil

Formerly included:

- E. mutchleri Petrunkevitch, 1930 (Transferred to Rejanellus)

Nomina dubia

- E. albicans (Mello-Leitão, 1929
- E. albovittatus (Caporiacco, 1954
- E. corticatus (Mello-Leitão, 1917
- E. flavus (Giebel, 1863
- E. gradiens (Mello-Leitão, 1929
- E. polyophthalmus (Mello-Leitão, 1929
- E. ruber (Giebel, 1863

== See also ==
- List of Thomisidae species
