= Macagua Dam =

Dam in Bolívar State, Venezuela

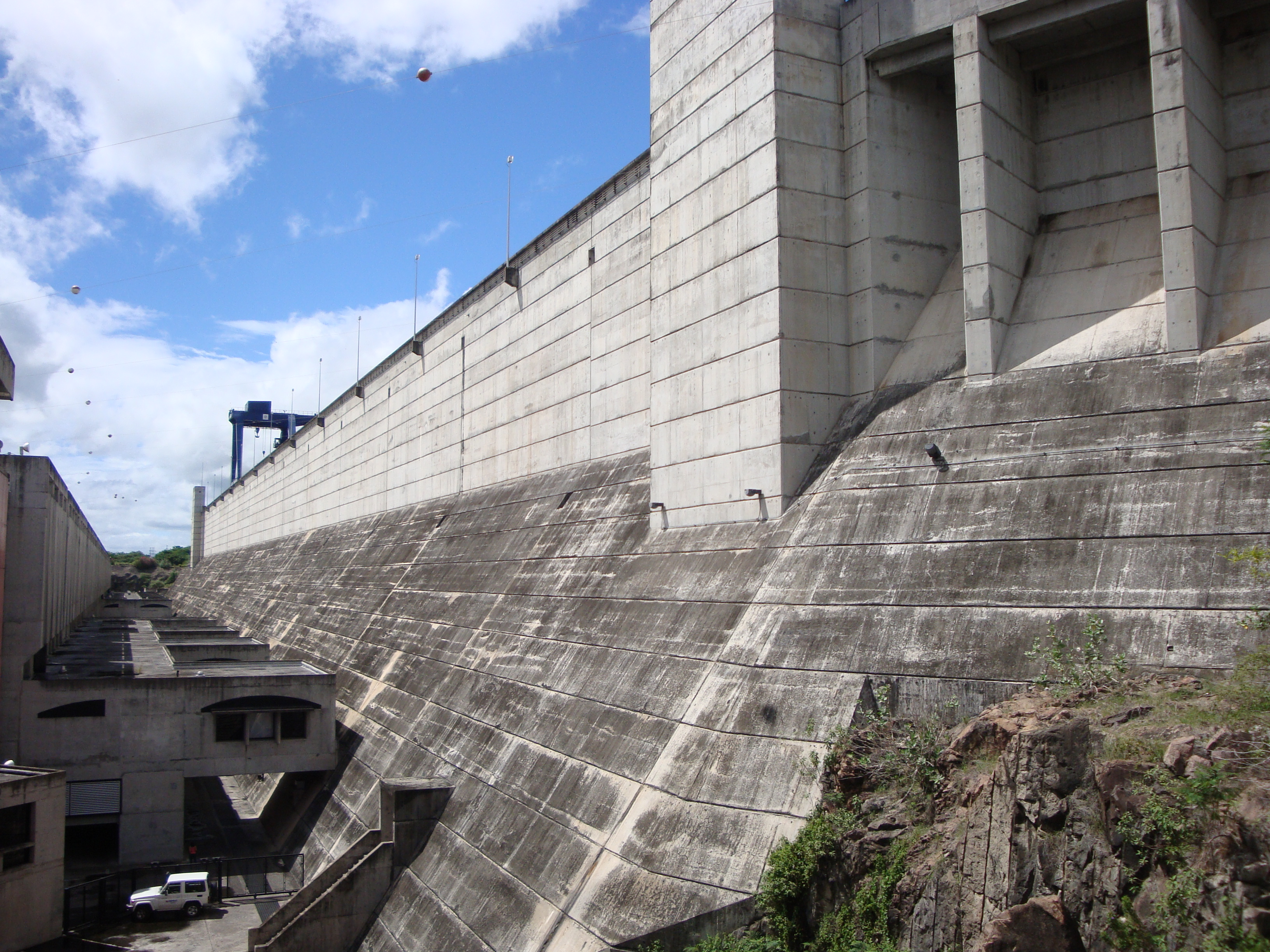

- Location within Venezuela
- Official name: Hidroeléctrica Antonio José de Sucre
- Country: Venezuela
- Location: Ciudad Guayana in Bolívar State
- Coordinates: 08°18′14″N 62°40′05″W
- Construction began: 1956
- Opening date: 1961
- Owners: CVG Electrificación del Caroní, C.A.

Dam and spillways
- Type of dam: Concrete gravity/embankment
- Impounds: Caroní River
- Height: 69 m (226 ft)
- Length: 3,537 m (11,604 ft)

Reservoir
- Creates: Macagua Reservoir
- Total capacity: 363,000,000 m^{3} (294,289 acre⋅ft)
- Surface area: 47.4 km^{2} (18.3 sq mi)

Power Station
- Commission date: Macagua I: 1961; Macagua II/III:1996
- Turbines: 20; Macagua I: 1x 79.5 MW (106,600 hp) Francis turbine, 5 x 64 MW (86,000 hp) Francis turbines Macagua II: 12 x 216 MW (290,000 hp) Francis turbines Macagua III: 2 x 88 MW (118,000 hp) Kaplan turbines
- Installed capacity: 3,167.5 MW (4,247,700 hp)
- Annual generation: 15,200 GWh (55,000 TJ)

The Macagua Dam, officially known as Antonio José de Sucre, is an embankment dam with concrete gravity sections on the Caroní River in Ciudad Guayana, Bolívar State, Venezuela. It is 10 kilometres (6.2 mi) upstream from the confluence of the Caroni and Orinoco Rivers, 81 km (50 mi) downstream of the Guri Dam and 22 kilometres (14 mi) downstream of the Caruachi Dam. The dam's main purpose is hydroelectric power generation and it was later named after Antonio José de Sucre.

== Dam ==
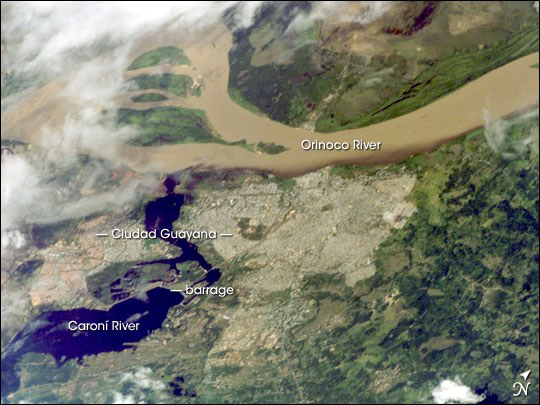
Macagua Dam (bottom left).

The Macagua Dam is a 69-metre (226 ft) tall and 3,537-metre (11,604 ft) long embankment dam with concrete gravity sections for each of the three different power stations. The dam supplies water to three power stations with a generation capacity of 3,167.5 megawatts (4,247,700 hp).

== Power plants ==
=== Macagua I ===
Macagua I 8°18′02″N 62°39′52″W was constructed from 1956 to 1961 and it contains 6 x 64 megawatts (86,000 hp) Francis turbine-generators for an installed capacity of 384 megawatts (515,000 hp). Currently, Macagua I is undergoing a refurbishment in order to increase the capacity of each generator from 64 MW to 79.5 megawatts (106,600 hp). The first generator was complete in 2010, the second is expected to be completed in 2011 and another each year thereafter.

=== Macagua II ===
Macagua II 8°18′14″N 62°40′04″W contains 12 x 216 megawatts (290,000 hp) Francis turbine-generators for an installed capacity of 1,592 megawatts (2,135,000 hp). Macagua II began operation in 1996 and was inaugurated in January 1997.

=== Macagua III ===
Macagua III 8°18′09″N 62°40′46″W contains 2 x 88 megawatts (118,000 hp) Kaplan turbine-generators for an installed capacity of 176 megawatts (236,000 hp). Macagua III began operation in 1996 and was inaugurated in January 1997.
