= Trans-Caribbean pipeline =

Pipeline in South America

Trans-Caribbean gas pipeline
- Location of Trans-Caribbean gas pipeline

Location
- Country: Venezuela, Colombia, Panama
- Direction: west-east (east-west)
- Start: Maracaibo, Venezuela
- To: Ballena gas fields, La Guajira, Colombia

General information
- Type: natural gas
- Operator: Petróleos de Venezuela S.A.
- Commissioned: 2007

Technical information
- Length: 224.4 km (139.4 mi)
- Maximum discharge: 5 billion cubic meters per year

The Trans-Caribbean gas pipeline (also known as the Antonio Ricaurte Gas Pipeline) is a natural gas pipeline between Venezuela and Colombia with proposed extension to Panama and probably to Nicaragua.

== History ==
The construction started on 8 July 2006 with presence of presidents Hugo Chávez of Venezuela, Álvaro Uribe of Colombia and Martín Torrijos of Panama. It was inaugurated on 12 October 2007. In November 2009, Colombia reduced exports from 220 million cubic feet a day to 70 million cubic feet a day due to a drought that required an increase of gas-fired power generation to support the decrease in hydro-power plants' reservoirs. On 9 October 2013, the pipeline was attacked, temporarily suspending the supply of natural gas from Colombia to Venezuela. The attack was attributed to FARC rebels. From May 2014 to February 2015, Colombia again suspended gas exports through the pipeline due to drought. When the gas exports resumed, Colombia exported an estimated 50 million cubic feet a day, about half the amount that was exported before May 2014. On 11 June 2015, Petróleos de Venezuela S.A.(PdV) announced that it would not renew the contract to import gas from Colombia, letting the contract expire on 30 June. As a result, the current pipeline is not in use.

== Description ==
The first stage of the pipeline is 224.4 kilometres (139.4 mi) long and it runs from Maracaibo in the state of Zulia in Venezuela to Puerto Ballena gas fields in La Guajira, Colombia. At the first stage, the pipeline pumps natural gas from Colombia to Venezuela. Transported gas is used by Petróleos de Venezuela S.A. for injection in its oil reservoirs to boost oil production. Natural gas is supplied by Ecopetrol and Chevron Corporation.

The construction of the first stage cost US$467 million. Its maximum capacity is 5 billion cubic meters of natural gas per year.

== Operator ==
The operator of the pipeline is Petróleos de Venezuela.

The original plan of the pipeline was for Colombia to pump gas to Venezuela until 2011, when the direction of the pipeline would be reversed, allowing Venezuela to export gas to Colombia. The reversal of the pipeline was delayed by PdV multiple times, with the most recent date as December 2016. The plan to reverse the pipeline never occurred due to PdV's financial troubles.

== See also ==
- Eastern Caribbean Gas Pipeline
