= Caroní River =

Caroní
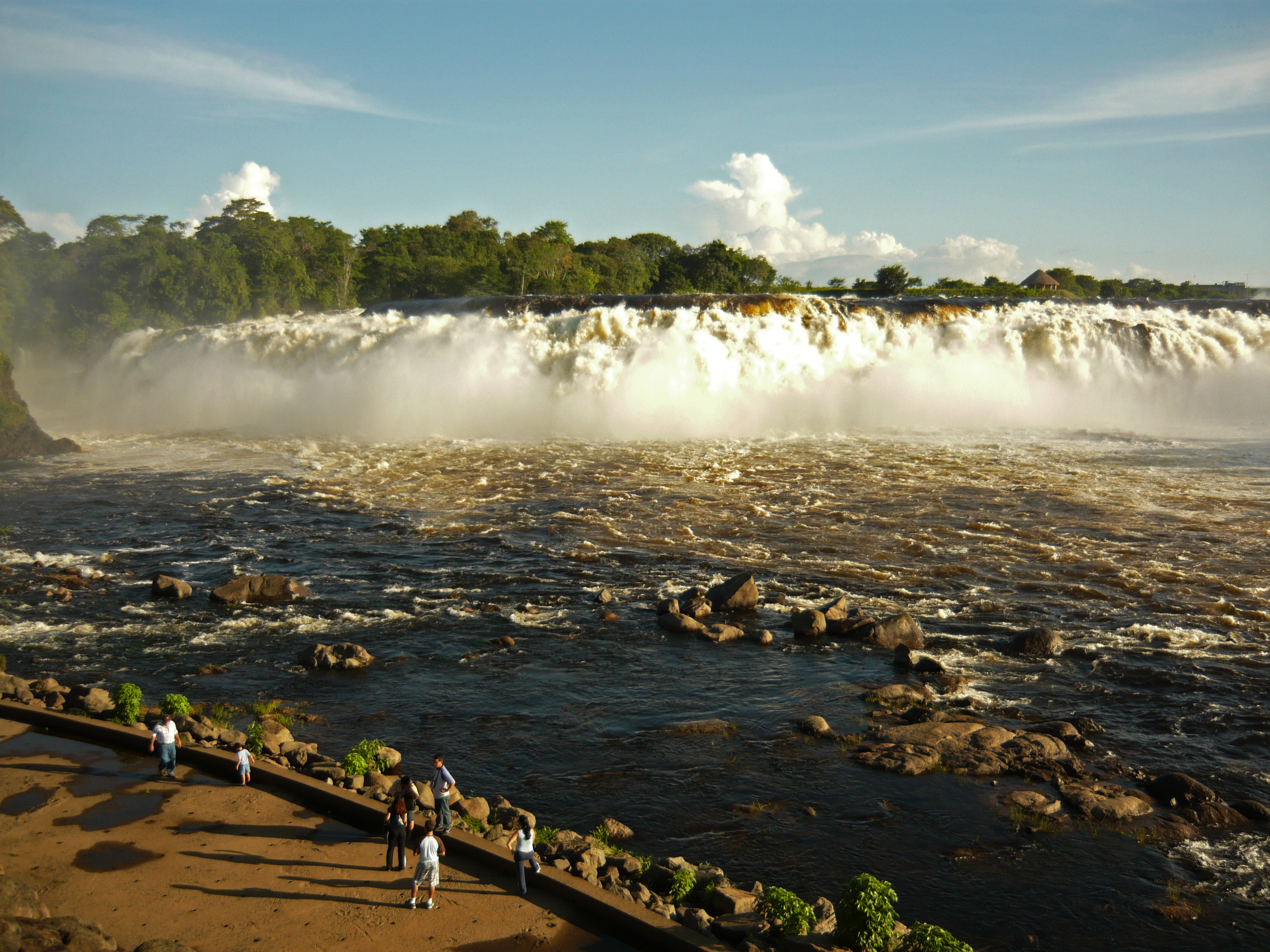
- Caroní River in La Llovizna National Park, Puerto Ordaz

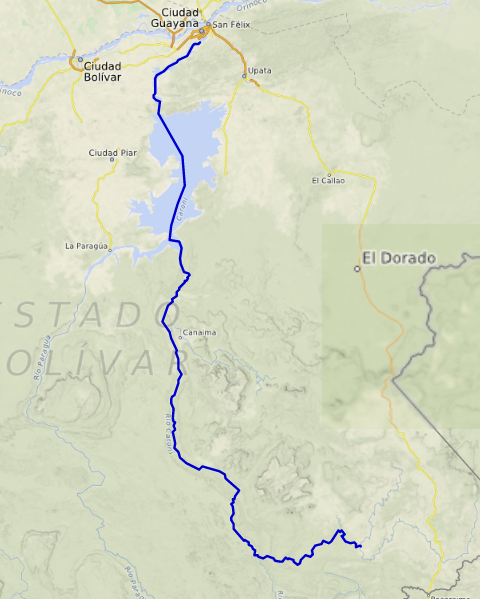

Location
- Country: Venezuela

Physical characteristics
- Source: Kukenan
  - location: in Gran Sabana, Bolívar
  - coordinates: 5°11′10″N 60°48′58″W
  - elevation: 2,271 m (7,451 ft)
- 2nd source: Yuruaní
  - location: Kavanayén, Gran Sabana, Bolívar
  - coordinates: 5°36′32″N 61°44′46″W
  - elevation: 1,177 m (3,862 ft)
- Mouth: Orinoco
  - location: Ciudad Guayana
  - coordinates: 8.355°N 62.720°W
  - elevation: 8 m (26 ft)
- Length: 952 km (592 mi)
- Basin size: 95,000 km^{2} (37,000 sq mi)
- Discharge
  - average: 5,093 m^{3}/s (179,900 cu ft/s) at the mouth

Basin features
- Progression: Caroní → Orinoco → Atlantic Ocean

The Caroní River is the second most important river of Venezuela, the second in flow, and one of the longest, 952 kilometres (592 mi) from the Kukenan tepui through to its confluence with the Orinoco River. The name "Caroní" is applied starting from the confluence of the Kukenan with the Yuruaní River at 182 kilometres (113 mi) from the source of the Kukenan and 770 kilometres (480 mi) from its discharge in the Orinoco. The confluence takes place in Bolivar State. The Caroní River is the longest river located entirely within Venezuela.

== Hydraulic regime ==
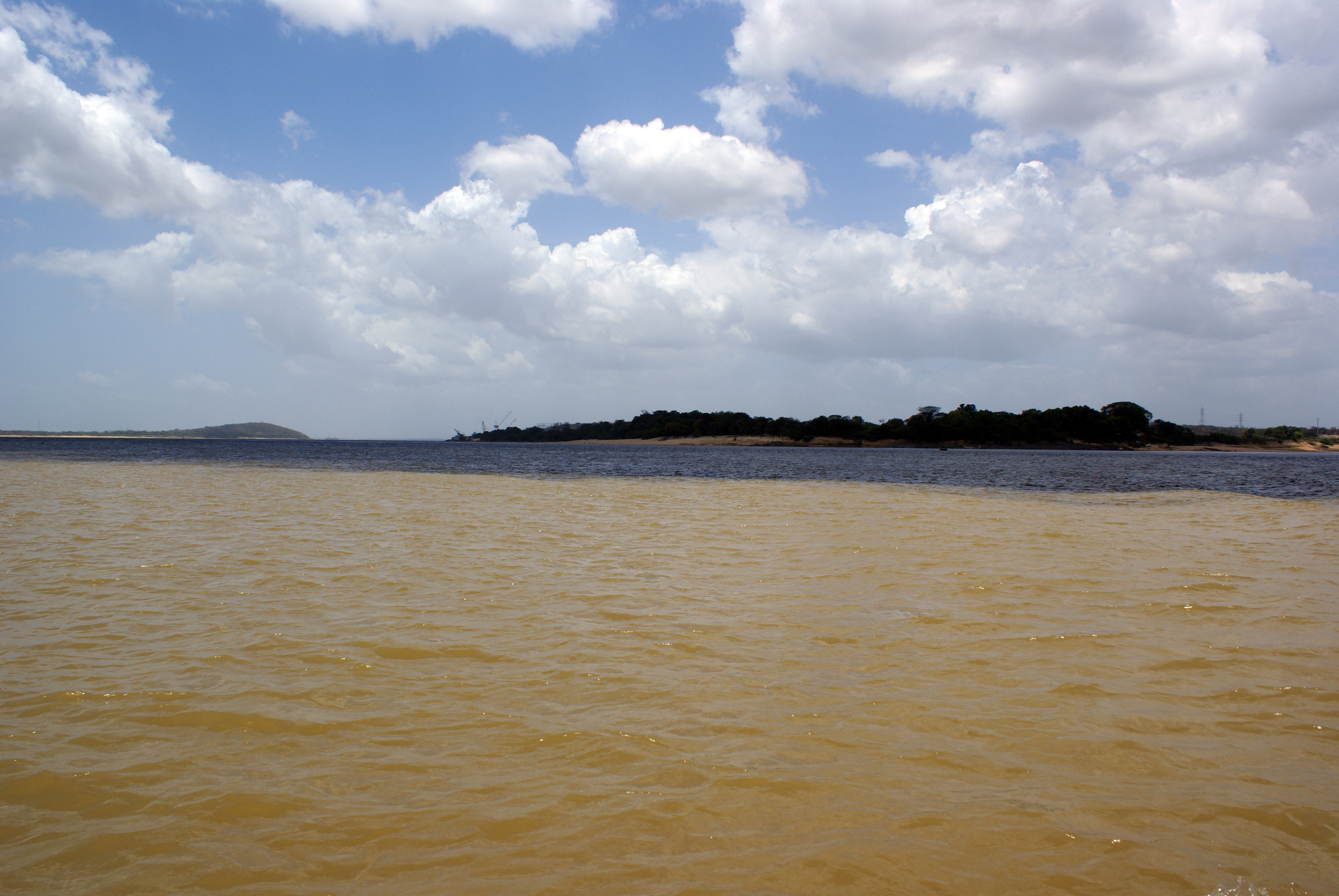
Confluence of Caroní River (in the background), a blackwater river with the Orinoco river, a whitewater river

The Caroní is one of the rivers with the highest discharge rates in the world, with respect to the area of its basin. The average discharge is 4,850 cubic metres per second (171,000 cu ft/s), with variations caused by the wet/dry seasons. The average maximum discharge is 6,260 cubic metres per second (221,000 cu ft/s), and the average minimum is 3,570 cubic metres per second (126,000 cu ft/s). Among the historic extremes are 17,576 cubic metres per second (620,700 cu ft/s). The Caroní supplies 15.5 percent of the discharge of the Orinoco river. One of the characteristics of the Caroní's water is the dark color, caused by the high amount of humic acids due to the incomplete decomposition of the phenol content of the vegetation. The Caroní thus belongs to the blackwater rivers, as does the Negro River, or Rio Negro in Brazil, Venezuela and Colombia. In the late 1940s diamonds were found in the Caroní basin near the famous Lost World Region which then was accessible only by aircraft and four wheel drive vehicles.

== Basin ==
The river drains the Guayanan Highlands moist forests ecoregion. The Caroní basin covers 95,000 square kilometres (37,000 mi^{2}) and is part of the Orinoco basin, the most important river of Venezuela. This means for the two big rivers that they have very similar hydrographic characteristics. The Caroní itself and its tributary the Paragua are rivers with a staircase, in the sense that many falls and rapids are alternated with stretches with gentle slopes, with many meanders and oxbow lakes (naturally cut off meanders). Among the most important falls of these rivers and their tributaries are Angel Falls, with the highest free fall of the world, almost 1,000 metres (3,300 ft), and Kukenan Falls, the tenth on the world scale with a 610-metre (2,000 ft) free fall. Others falls with less height but high volume are the Aponwao, Caruay and La Llovizna waterfalls.

== Hydroelectric power ==
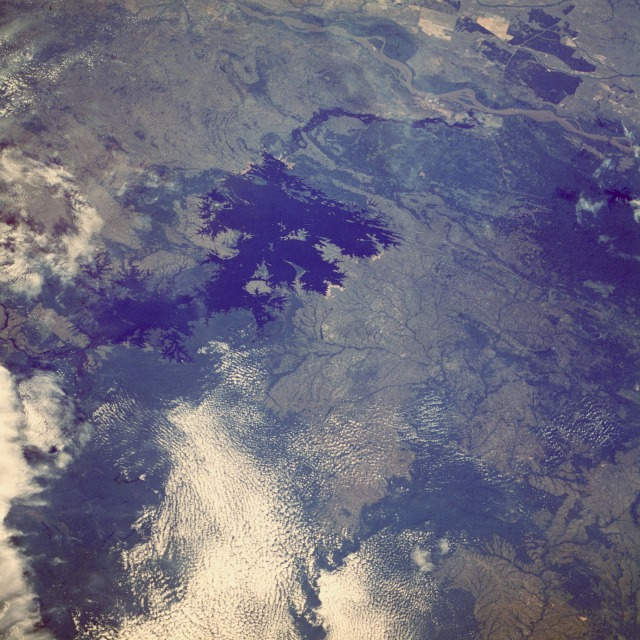
The Caroní River and the Guri Reservoir

Because of its high discharge rate, with a yearly average of 4,850 cubic metres per second (171,000 cu ft/s) and a steep slope, the Caroni ideally suited for the generation of hydroelectric energy with four plants along its course (Macagua I, II and III), near its mouth, the Caruachi, some 30 kilometres (19 mi) aback, and lastly the plant of Guri, in the middle of Necoima or Necuima, some 80 kilometres (50 mi) from Puerto Ordaz. This plant has its reservoir, with an area of 4,000 square kilometres (1,500 mi^{2}), in the middle of the river, and has a power of 10,000 MW, and is now the third biggest in the world, after the Three Gorges Dam in China (22,500 MW) and the Itaipu Dam in Paraguay and Brazil (14,000 MW)

== National Parks ==
In the high basin of the rivers that form the Caroni (Aponguao, Cuquenán and Yuruaní) the Gran Sabana is spread out, partly belonging to the Canaima National Park.

== Mining ==
Along the Caroní River between the confluence with the Icabarú River and San Salvador de Paúl, there are several artisanal gold mines, mainly on the left hand side of the river outside the national park, but a few can also be found on the right hand side inside the Canaima National Park. Besides the devastating effects of logging and deforestation to clear the site for the mines, the far greater danger is the use of mercury which poisons the Caroní river, its fauna and inhabitants living along its shore. High levels of mercury have been found not only in the Caroní river but also in Lake Guri and further downstream. The government of Venezuela pledged to reduce illegal mining activities with the sustainable development plan for mining from 2016-18.

Illegal mining surged under the government of Hugo Chávez, due to the nationalization of mines run by international mining companies and this had the negative consequence of an increase of mercury use as other processes are more difficult and costly to use for illegal, artisanal mining.
