= Guri Dam =

Simón Bolívar Hydroelectric Plant Guri Dam
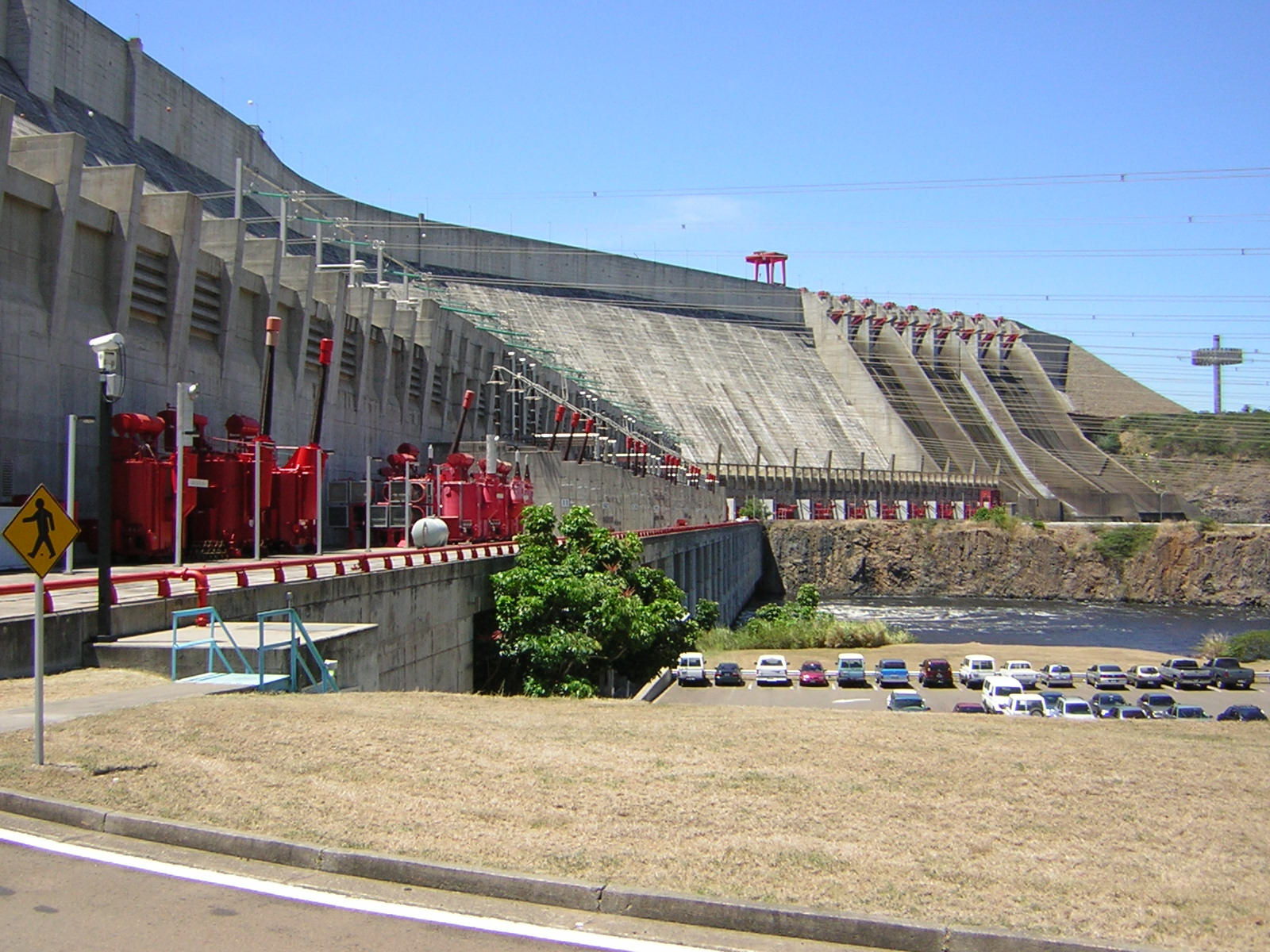
- Interactive map of Simón Bolívar Hydroelectric Plant; Guri Dam
- Official name: Central Hidroeléctrica Simón Bolívar
- Location: Necuima Canyon, Bolívar
- Status: In use
- Construction began: 1963
- Opening date: 1978
- Owners: CVG Electrificación del Caroní, C.A.

Dam and spillways
- Type of dam: Gravity/embankment
- Impounds: Caroni River
- Height: 162 m (531 ft)
- Length: 7,426 m (24,364 ft)
- Dam volume: Concrete: 6,026,000 m^{3} (212,806,182 ft^{3}); Earth: 23,801,000 m^{3} (840,524,383 ft^{3})
- Spillway type: Service, controlled crest overflow
- Spillway capacity: 27,000 m^{3}/s (953,496 cu ft/s)

Reservoir
- Creates: Guri Reservoir
- Total capacity: 135,000,000,000 m^{3} (109,446,281 acre⋅ft)
- Surface area: 4,250 km^{2} (1,641 sq mi)

Power Station
- Turbines: Francis Turbines. 10 × 725 MW; 4 × 180 MW; 3 × 400 MW; 3 × 225 MW; 1 × 340 MW
- Installed capacity: 10,235 MW
- Annual generation: 47,000 GWh

The Simón Bolívar Hydroelectric Plant, also Guri Dam (Spanish: Central Hidroeléctrica Simón Bolívar or Represa de Guri), previously known as the Raúl Leoni Hydroelectric Plant, is a concrete gravity and embankment dam in Bolívar State, Venezuela, on the Caroni River, built from 1963 to 1969. It is 7,426 metres long and 162 m high. It impounds the large Guri Reservoir (Embalse de Guri) with a surface area of 4,250 square kilometres (1,641 sq mi).

The Guri Reservoir that supplies the dam is one of the largest on earth. The hydroelectric power station was once the largest worldwide in terms of installed capacity, replacing Grand Coulee HPP, but was surpassed by Brazil and Paraguay's Itaipu.

== History and design ==
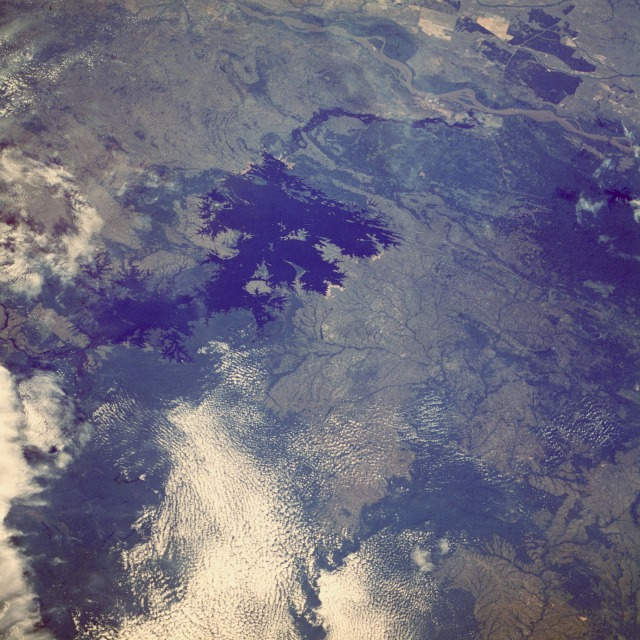
The dam and reservoir as seen from space.

Technical and economic feasibility studies were begun in 1961, conducted by the Harza Engineering Company. An international consortium of six firms was awarded the contract for the construction of the plant, including four United States companies participating under the Alliance for Progress. In 1963, construction began for the hydroelectric power station Guri in the Necuima Canyon, about 100 kilometers upstream from the mouth of the Caroní River in the Orinoco. By 1969, a 106 m-high (348 ft) and 690 m-long (2,260 ft) dam with the official name of Central Hidroeléctrica Simón Bolívar (previously named Central Hidroeléctrica Raúl Leoni from 1978 to 2000) had been built. It created a reservoir which is the largest fresh water body of water in Venezuela and one of the largest man-made blackwater lakes ever created, with its water level at 215 metres above sea level. The power station had a combined installed capacity of 1750 megawatts (MW). By 1978, the capacity had been upgraded to 2065 MW, generated by ten turbines.

Because the electricity demand grew so fast, 1976 saw the beginning of a second building stage: a 1,300 m-long (4,300 ft) gravity dam was built, another spillway channel and a second powerhouse containing 10 turbines of 725 MW each. This increased the dam's dimensions to 162 m (531 ft) in height and to 7426 m (according to other sources 11,409 m) in crest length. The water level rose to 272 m and the reservoir grew in size and volume to a capacity of 138 billion cubic m for flood storage or floodwater evacuation. The structure was inaugurated on 8 November 1986.

Since 2000, there is an ongoing refurbishment project to extend the operation of Guri Power Plant by 30 years. This project is to create 5 new runners and main components on Powerhouse II, and close to the end of 2007 is starting the rehabilitation of four units on Powerhouse I.

== Generating failures and blackouts ==
=== 2010 ===
Due to government policy in effect from the 1960s to minimize power production from fossil fuels in order to export as much oil as possible, 74% of Venezuela's electricity comes from renewable energy like hydroelectric power. As of 2006 the Guri Dam alone supplied more than a third of Venezuela's electricity Part of the power generated at Guri is exported to Colombia and Brazil. The risks of this strategy became apparent in 2010, when, due to a prolonged drought, water levels were too low to produce enough electricity to meet demand. In January 2010, the Venezuelan government imposed rolling blackouts to combat low water levels behind the dam due to drought.

=== 2016 ===
In April 2016, water levels again became low, and the government announced blackouts of 4 hours per day, for 40 days or until water levels stabilized. Government employees were told not to come to work on Fridays, president Maduro urged women not to use hair dryers, and the electricity supplied to fifteen shopping malls was rationed. Three days were added to the 2016 Easter national holiday, allowing for a one-week shutdown of public services and private businesses.

=== 2019 ===
On 7 March 2019, shortly before 17:00 local time, the Simón Bolívar Hydroelectric Plant failed, leaving most of Venezuela's 32 million citizens in darkness. In the days following the onset of the blackout, at least four attempts were made to restart the key San Gerónimo B substation, which distributes 80% of the country's electricity, but all failed, and no date was set for the plant's reactivation. Government officials claim the blackout was "an act of sabotage", while experts attributed the failure to aging infrastructure and insufficient maintenance.

== See also ==
- Energy policy of Venezuela
- List of largest power stations in the world
- List of conventional hydroelectric power stations
