= Tocoma Dam =

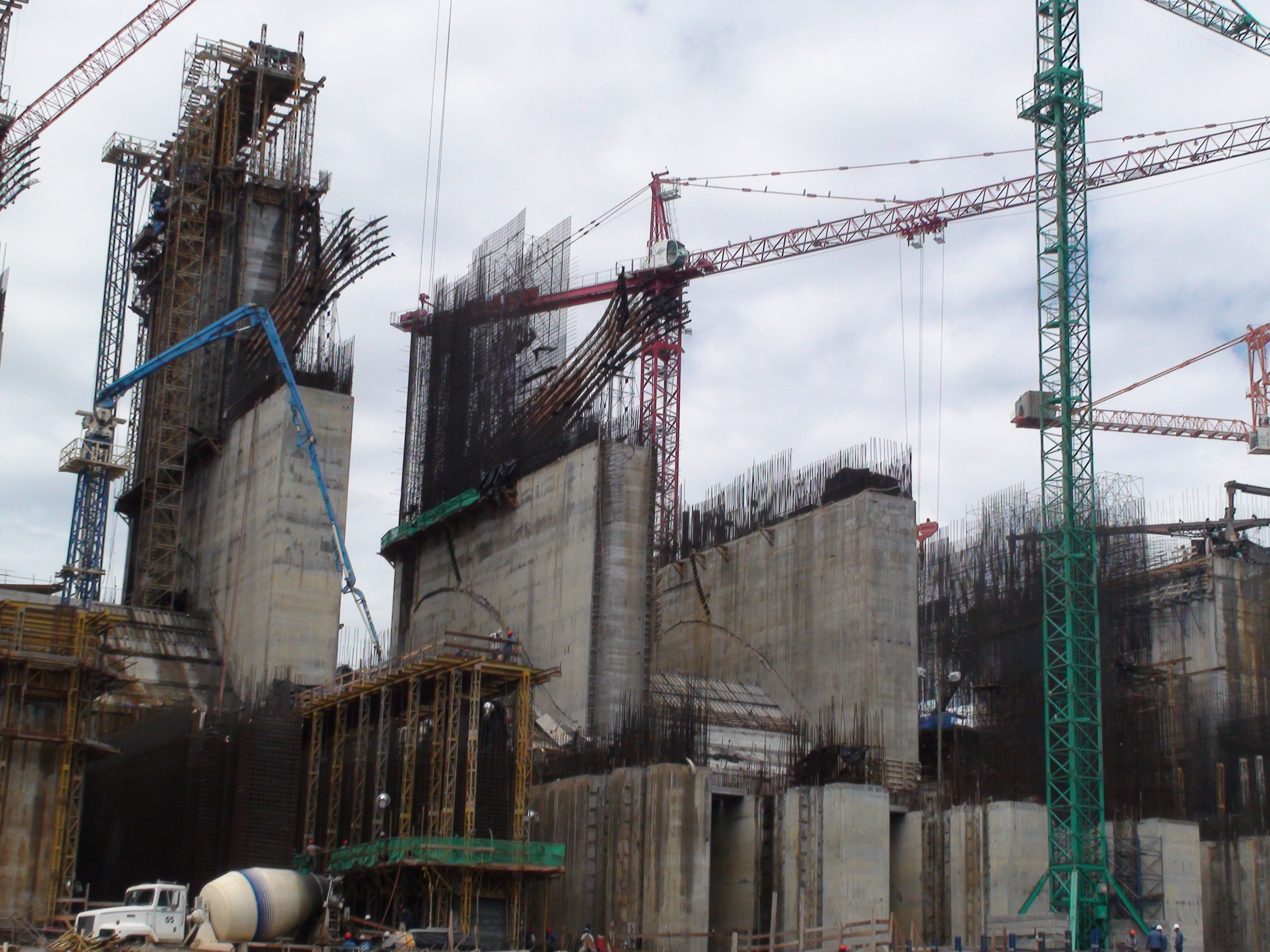

- Location within Venezuela
- Official name: Manuel Piar Hydroelectric Power Plant
- Country: Venezuela
- Coordinates: 7°54′25″N 63°01′35″W
- Status: On-hold
- Construction began: 2006
- Opening date: unknown

Dam and spillways
- Type of dam: Composite, rock-fill/gravity
- Impounds: Caroní River
- Height: 65 m (213 ft)
- Length: Gravity section: 360 m (1,180 ft); Rock-fill section: 1,800 m (5,906 ft); Concrete-face rock-fill section: 3,800 m (12,500 ft)
- Spillway capacity: 28,750 m^{3}/s (1,015,000 cu ft/s)

Reservoir
- Total capacity: 1,770,000,000 m^{3} (1,430,000 acre⋅ft)
- Surface area: 87 km^{2} (34 sq mi)
- Normal elevation: 127 m (417 ft)

Power Station
- Commission date: ?
- Hydraulic head: 34.65 m (113.7 ft)
- Turbines: 10 x 232 MW (311,000 hp) Kaplan-type
- Installed capacity: 2,320 MW (3,110,000 hp)
- Annual generation: 12,100 GWh (44,000 TJ)

The Manuel Piar Hydroelectric Power Plant (Tocoma Dam) is a stalled hydroelectric development project in the Lower Caroní River Basin of Venezuela. The project, started in 2006, includes the installation of 2,320 megawatts (3,110,000 hp) MW to generate annual average energy of 12,100 gigawatt-hours (44,000 TJ). As of 2019, the project is unfinished.

The project was awarded to OIV consortium, consisting of Odebrecht (50%), Salini Impregilo (40%) and Vinccler (10%), with an initial budget US$3,061 mil. Ten Kaplan generator units, of 230 megawatts (310,000 hp), manufactured by an Argentinian company IMPSA, were predicted to begin operations between 2012 and 2014. These units had the world record as of 2012 in power generation at nominal head for Kaplan turbines. The diameter of the runner is 8.6 metres (28 ft) and nominal head is 34.65 metres (113.7 ft) with claimed output up to 232 megawatts (311,000 hp).

The first generator was installed but not yet commissioned in April 2012. Behind schedule, the dam began to impound its reservoir on 16 November 2015. The budget tripled to $9,4 billion in 2017, as of 2019 the project is still unfinished. Odebrecht spent between 2007 and 2015 at least $118 million on bribes related to the project.
