= Fuel shortages in Venezuela =

Shortages due to the economic crisis in Venezuela

A chronic lack of gasoline and other fuels in Venezuela began in the mid 2010s, despite Venezuela having the largest oil reserves in the world. Although there is significant oil in Venezuela, much of its crude oil is heavy and sour, which requires complex refining to produce gasoline, making the country dependent on functioning refineries and imported fuel. The shortages developed as Venezuela's oil industry declined due to reduced crude production, underinvestment, loss of technical personnel, and government price controls that kept domestic gasoline prices low. The general strike of 2002–2003 resulted in the stoppage of the oil industry, which caused fuel shortages domestically. After the election of Nicolás Maduro in 2013 and the collapse of global oil prices in 2014, Venezuela's refining capacity and fuel imports rapidly declined, leading to nationwide gasoline shortages and a decline in society and the environment.

== History ==
Oil was discovered in Venezuela in the early 1920s, transforming the country from an agricultural economy to one of the world's leading petroleum exporters. Under the Venezuelan Petroleum Law of 1922, oil reserves were state-owned, but foreign private companies, mainly from the U.S. and Europe, conducted the extraction, while the government collected revenue through royalties and taxes.In 1960, the Organization of the Petroleum Exporting Countries (OPEC) was established, which included Venezuela along with several other nations. During this year, Venezuela was the biggest OPEC producer of crude oil. Later that year, the Venezuelan government raised their royalties and tax prices, so the foreign companies pulled back their investments, causing a decline of output. In 1976, Venezuela nationalized the oil industry, creating Petróleos de Venezuela (PDVSA) as the sole, largest state-owned oil company. The company was created to provide the country with greater control of their reserves, initially boosting oil revenue. Through the last few decades of the 20th century, Venezuela increased their oil reserves in order to grow PDVSA's investments. The country became one of the world's largest oil producers during the 20th century and developed a petroleum-dependent economy.

== Crude oil ==
=== General strike of 2002–2003 ===
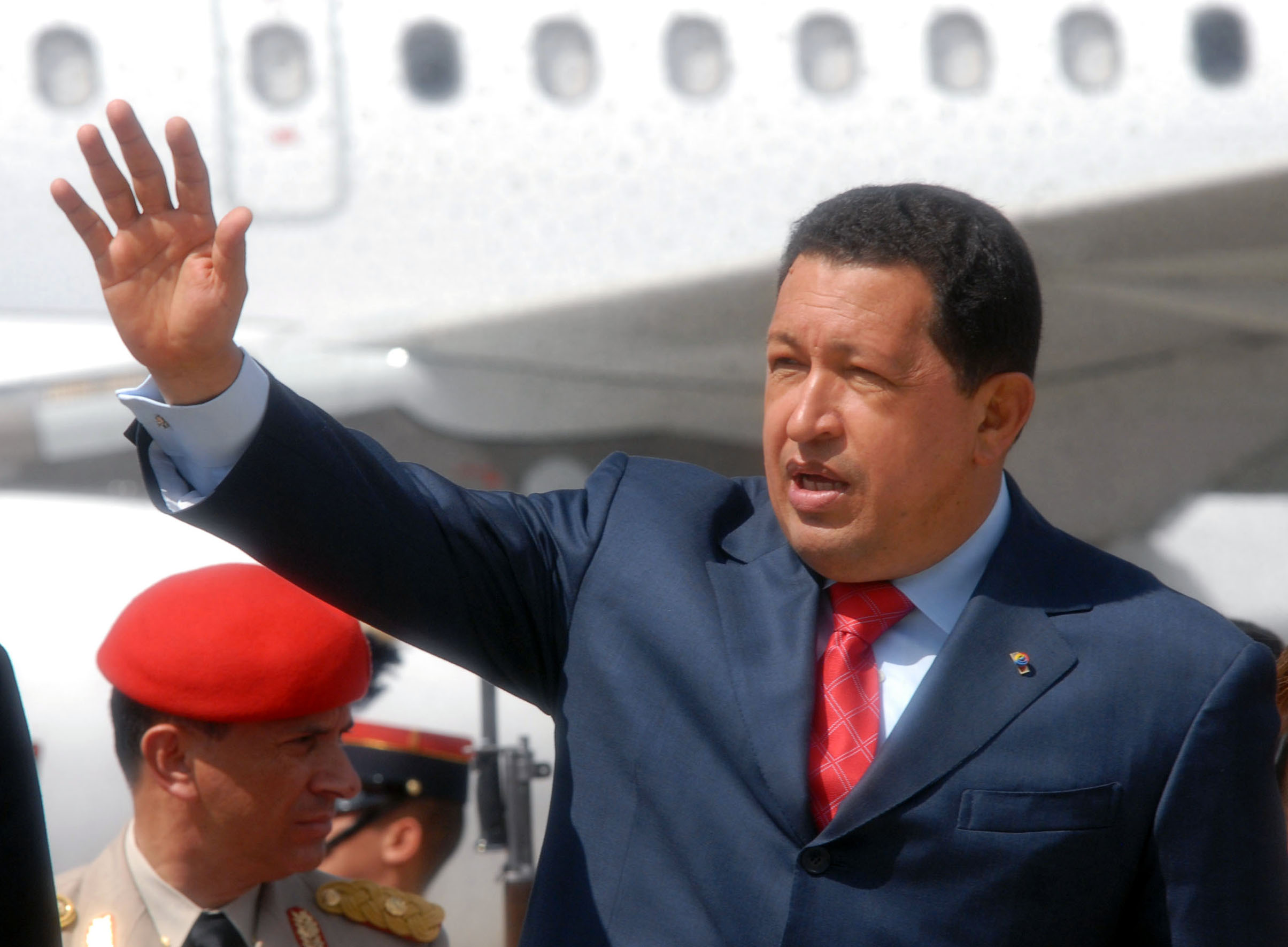
President Hugo Chavez in 2005.

The general strike of 2002–2003, aimed at Hugo Chávez's resignation, resulted in the stoppage of the oil industry, particularly PDVSA, which caused significant fuel shortages domestically. When Chávez became president in 1998 (1998-2012), he promised Venezuelans that he would address the economic issues related to the decline of oil prices. He wanted to increase PDVSA's income in order to finance his own campaign programs, such as healthcare, education, housing, and poverty reduction, so sending the profit to the government, instead of reinvesting the money back into PDVSA. He passed the "Hydrocarbons Law" that gave him and the Venezuelan state control over PDVSA, including their profits, strategies, and everyday decisions, which was a main reason for the strike.

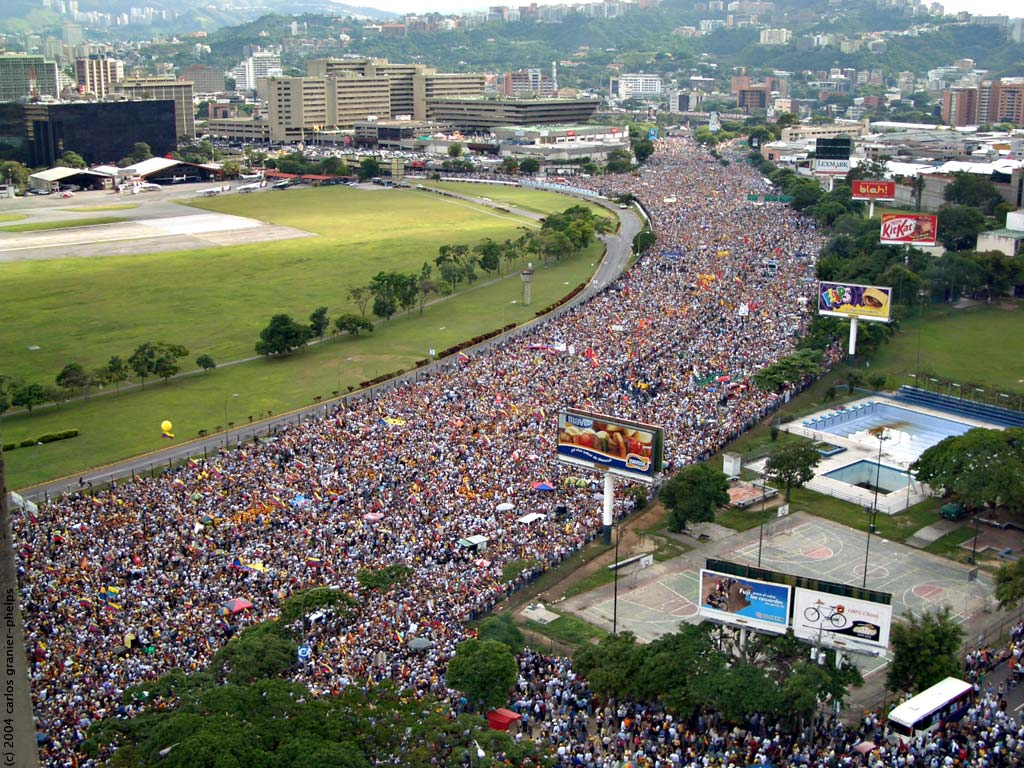
An anti-Chavez march attempting to get him out of office in April 2002.

This oil strike included not only the PDVSA management, but also substantial parts of its operational staff, including virtually all of its marine flotilla captains. The loss of these specialized employees left PDVSA unable to perform regular operations. Within days the company was paralyzed. Petroleum production soon fell to one-third normal and Venezuela had to begin importing oil. Domestically, gasoline for cars became virtually unobtainable, with many filling stations closed and long queues at others.There were also more than just PDVSA employees striking; teachers' business owners, executives, and other workers also participated. Many privately owned businesses closed or went on short time, some out of sympathy for the strike, others because of the fuel shortage and economic paralysis. As long waits for gasoline became common, airlines cancelled many domestic flights, banks limited their opening hours, and many shops were shut despite the peak Christmas shopping season. The strike cost Venezuela over 7.6 billion US dollars in revenue and lost production.

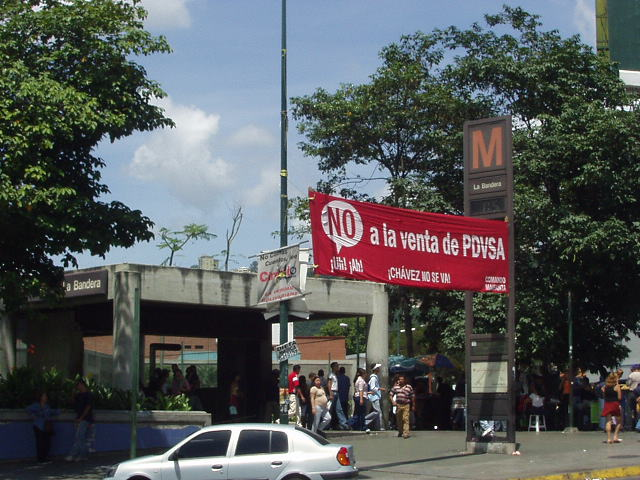
Venezuelan gas station after the strike of 2002-2003.

By February 2003, the strike was over outside the oil industry. The government gradually reestablished control over PDVSA and oil production reached pre-strike levels by April 2003. Despite the revival, the event caused weakening in the PDVSA. Following the strike, around 18,000 employees who participated were fired, including managers, technicians, and workers. Soon after, Chávez appointed several of his own staff members in replacement, many of whom had limited knowledge of the oil industry.

=== Post-strike ===
Researchers have identified the loss of experienced personnel as a contributing factor in the long-term decline of Venezuela's oil industry. In addition to the reduction in personnel, Chavez continued to use the money generated by the oil industry to finance government spending, such as healthcare, education, housing, and poverty reduction. This left PDVSA with less money to help their production rates by maintaining refineries, pipelines and extraction facilities. Additionally, a portion of the country's oil revenue went towards PDVSA's growing debt.

Structural characteristics of Venezuela's oil resource further adds to the shortages. Most of the country's petroleum is extra-heavy crude oil from the Orinoco Belt, which requires specialized refining technologies and chemical diluents in order to produce gasoline and other fuels. When refinery capacity and funds declined and access to these outputs became limited, fuel production decreased significantly. Extra-heavy crude oil is also costly because the deposits dry up quickly.

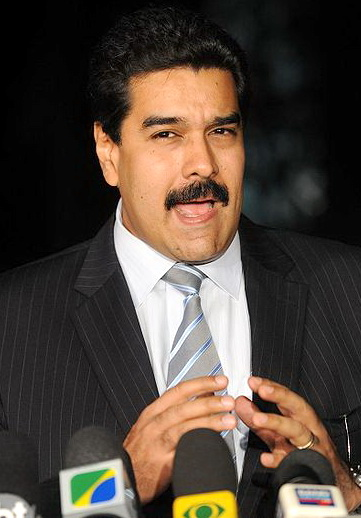
Nicolás Maduro after assuming the Presidency following the death of Hugo Chávez.

=== Oil price collapse ===
After the death of Hugo Chávez, Nicolás Maduro's became president in 2013. Maduro's election inspired a large-scale boycott, with less than half of the population participating in the presidential vote. He did not modify the regulations put in place by Chavez. The high production rates in the Orinoco Belt delayed the crisis in Venezuela, but overall declines led to further struggles within PDVSA as demand for oil imports continued to grow.Globally, the price of a barrel of oil fell from $150 in 2008, to $100 in July 2014, to $50 in January 2015. Oil prices had dropped by about 70% by the end of 2015.The fall of oil prices in 2014 inspired policy revisions within OPEC, causing a crash in the exchange rate between the dollar and the Bolivar and a fall in gas production.

Due to the country's high dependence on oil revenue, this crash led to a crisis characterized by significant drops in salaries and goods shortages. Oil imports represented 90-96% of all imports in 2014, but has since lowered to 88% in 2025. This trend of dependence is referred to as the "Dutch disease," describing the economic fluctuations that result from reliance on a single source of income. Additionally, the high prices of oil preceding this fall allowed the Venezuelan government to raise spending on public and social services, which has continued to raise the country's debt since 2014.

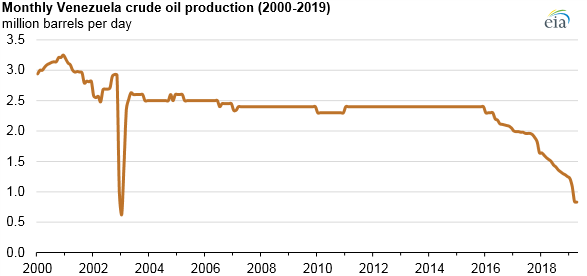
A graph of Venezuela's crude oil production from 2000 to 2018

According to the OPEC, while in 2013 2.6 million oil barrels were processed in Venezuela daily, the production fell to only 1.1 million daily barrels in November 2018, which was half of the production in 2013. In 2021, production continued to decrease to only 527 thousand barrels daily. The decrease of oil production causes the collapse of refineries: in 2018, of a capacity of 1.6 million daily barrels, the facilities only produced 20% of their capacity.Most of these exports were destined to external debts payments; according to economist Ramón Key, the situation directly affects state finances, which does not have enough cash flow to recover the production and meet its obligations to invest in industry maintenance.

== Gasoline shortages ==
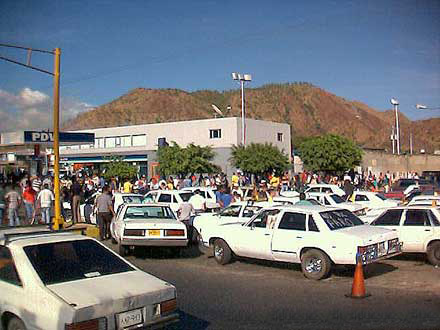
Long lines of cars at gas stations on December 10, 2002.

Gasoline shortages intensified during the 2010s as the countries refining capacity declined and domestic fuel demand continued to grow. A central structural cause of the shortages was Venezuela's long-standing policy of extreme gasoline price controls and subsidies, which kept domestic fuel prices among the lowest in the world for decades. These subsidies required PDVSA to sell gasoline domestically at price below production and refining costs, resulting in significant financial losses. For many years, Venezuelan gasoline cost only a few US cents per gallon, making it among the cheapest fuel prices in the world. These subsidies cost the government an estimated $12 million annually.

During the 2000s and early 2010s, Venezuela's low fuel prices created strong incentives for fuel smuggling, particularly across the Colombian border. Because gasoline could be purchased in Venezuela at a fraction of international prices, it was widely trafficked and sold abroad at large profits. This illegal trade reduced the amount of gasoline available for Venezuelan consumers and contributed to widespread shortages. Each gas station needs at least a daily charge to have enough fuel to operate, but some trucks do not arrive with said frequency. By early 2018, gasoline shortages began to spread, with hundreds of drivers in many regions waiting for hours in lines to fill their tanks, sleeping overnight in their vehicles during the wait.

Venezuela historically possessed one of the largest refining systems in Latin America, including major facilities such as Amuay, Cardon, El Palito, and Puerto La Cruz. One examples, in Caracas', Venezuela's capital, fuel supply is processed in the Paraguaná Refinery Complex, Falcón state, and later transported in boats to the Carencro distribution plant, Miranda state. Once stored, the fuel is sent through a poliducto to a distribution plant in Guatire, which is finally distributed to gas stations in Caracas. However the Paraguana refinery has not been operating at its full capacity due to the lack of maintenance. In late 2018, two explosions were reported in the Guatire plant. Gas station employees interviewed by Efecto Cocuyo affirmed that the supply shortages are caused by fires in the Guatire facilities, and in response tank trucks are redirected from the Anzoátegui and Carabobo states. After the fires, the refinery was only using about 10% of its capacity in 2023.

=== Fuel imports ===
As Venezuela's domestic refining capacity declined during the 2010s, the country heavily relied on imports of refined fuel and petroleum blending components. Historically, Venezuela imported gasoline and refinery inputs from the United States, but U.S. sanctions imposed in 2017 restricted these transactions. In response, the Venezuelan government sought alternative suppliers, including shipments of gasoline from Iran beginning in 2020. Despite these efforts, fuel imports often remained insufficient to meet domestic demand, contributing to continued shortages.

== U.S. sanctions ==
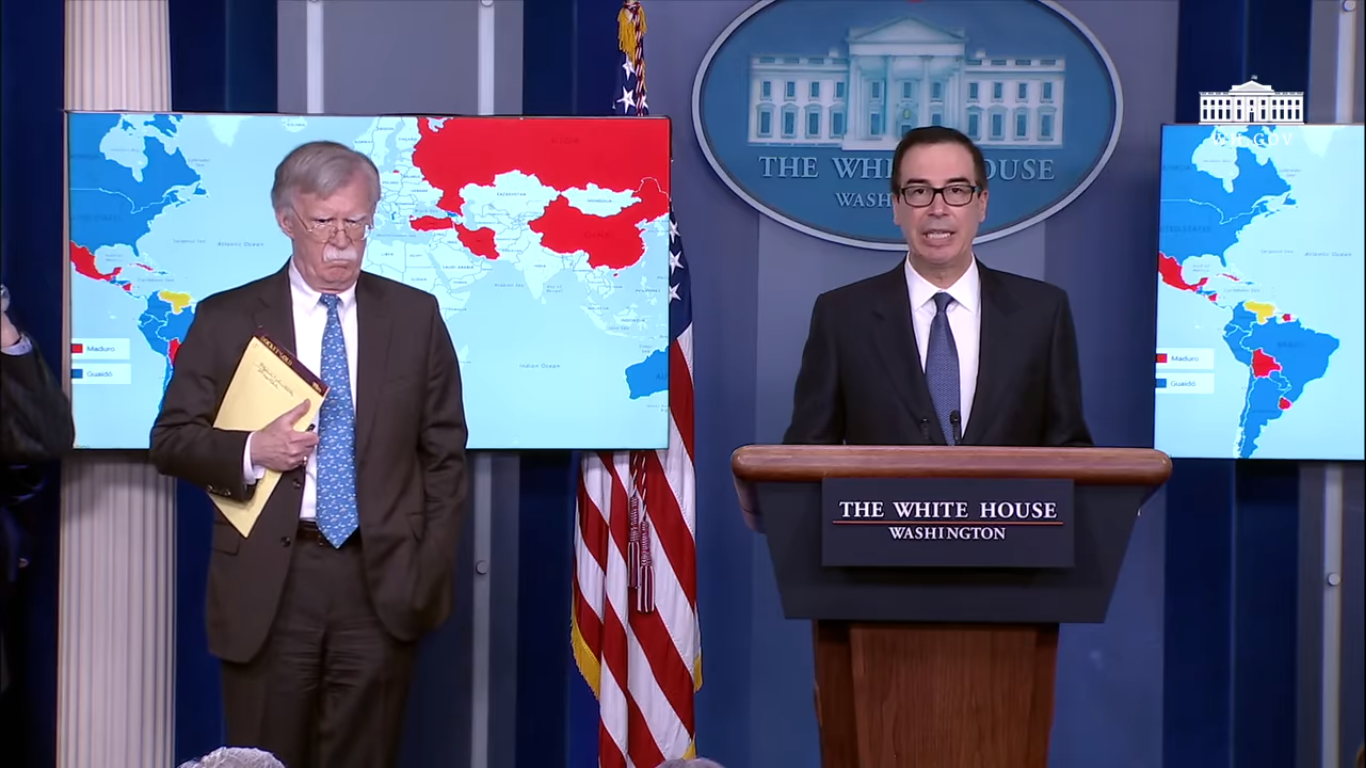
U.S. sanctions against PDVSA being announced in 2019

U.S. sanctions on Venezuelas oil sector have significantly affected the county's ability to produce, refine, and import fuel. U.S. sanctions were officially issued in 2017, directed at challenging Maduro's decisions and allegedly illegal actions. Further sanctions came in 2019, increasing the country's debt and economic problems, as well as spurring a public health crisis. These sanctions prevented Venezuela from accessing American markets, which caused inflation and fuel shortages to reach new levels. Additionally, this led to a decrease in imports, which worsened shortages given the lack of needed resources to produce oil. In 2023, the U.S. eased up on sanctions allowing Venezuela's oil and gas imports to increase by 12%. Venezuela could not meet the conditions stated by the U.S., which included the Barbados Agreement, so the sanctions were reimposed in 2024. Then in February 2026, after the capture of Maduro, the U.S. issued new licenses allowing international energy companies to resume oil/gas operations in Venezuela, while sanctions on the Venezuelan government remained.

== Coronavirus pandemic ==
Coronavirus protocols in action at the Venezuelan Embassy

The Coronavirus pandemic of 2020 saw further shortages, but overall demand also dropped as a result of efforts to reduce the spread of the virus. Venezuela, along with other members of OPEC, decreased production to comply with these mitigation efforts. Although fuel shortages have continued to affect the country's economy, they also decreased the spread of Coronavirus throughout Venezuela, given that travel was restricted by a lack of access to gasoline.

== Additional impacts ==
=== Societal ===
The years following the collapse of oil prices saw increased rates of violence throughout Venezuela, with thousands of protests taking hold. Today, the country has one of the highest murder rates in the world. A concept known as the resource curse, describing the trend of resource rich nations being economically poor, predicts an increased likelihood of unrest in countries that economically depend on resource exports. The theory argues that possessing resources high in demand leads to conflict surrounding its management and extraction.

As of 2017, nearly 90% of Venezuelans are living in poverty and widespread blackouts are causing disruptions to resident's every-day lives. The crisis led to electricity problems, which influenced other aspects such as water availability and mortality and disease rates. A housing crisis due to internal migration patterns has further lowered the health and financial status of many Venezuelans. Rising poverty has also led to increased rates of dumpster diving as food availability drops. This has been sparked by fuel shortages significantly disrupting transportation and agriculture, causing the prevention of food being delivered from farms to market.In some cases, harvested produce has been left to rot in fields because transport vehicles could not obtain gasoline. The shortages have also disrupted the delivery of agriculture inputs such as pesticides, fertilizers, and machinery parts, further reducing agricultural productivity and worsening food insecurity.

=== Environmental ===
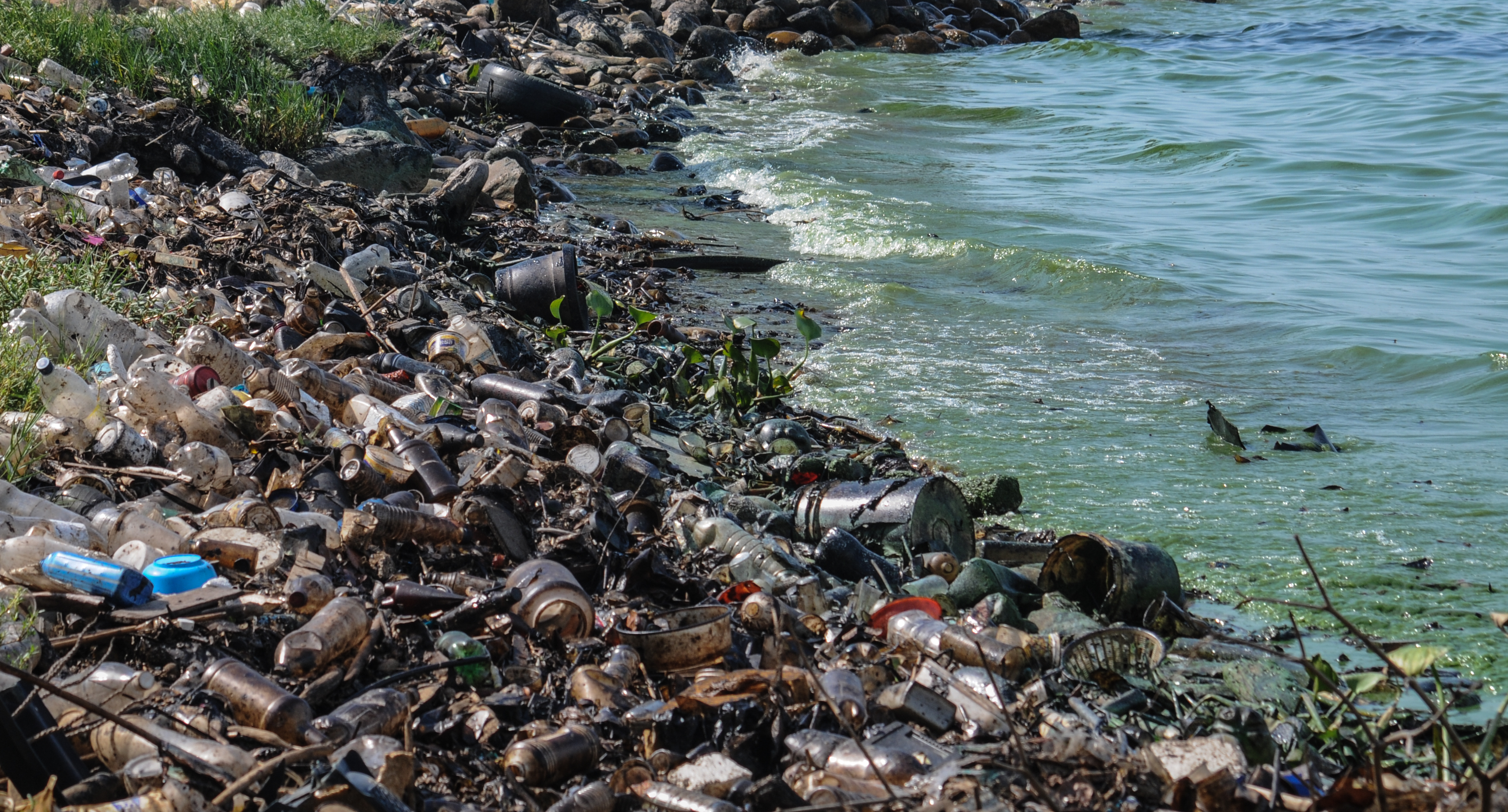
Oil and pollution on the shores of Lake Maracaibo

The deterioration of oil infrastructure during the fuel crisis has contributed to an increased number of oil spills and environmental incidents across the country. Numerous spills associated with pipelines, refineries and storage facilities operated by PDVSA have been documented. These incidents have contaminated coastal, ecosysems, wetlands, and marine environments. Between 2016 and 2020, PDVSA reported that more than one million barrels of oil were spilled in Venezuela. In 2025, oil contamination was reported in Lake Maracaibo, one of the largest lakes in South America and a biologically diverse estuarine system containing more than 140 fish species and mangrove habitats. Also multiple oil spills have been reported in 2020, 2024, and 2025 by El Palito refinery, near the coast. In 2020, the refinery leaked over 20,00 barrels into the water. The spill in 2024 covered 200 square kilometers, while the spill in 2025 spread 225 square kilometers, affecting beaches and coastal waters. These spills spread into and contaminated protected ecosystems such as Morrocoy National Park, where it has mangroves, coral habitats, and coastal food webs that support phytoplankton, microorganisms fish, birds and humans.

Incidents have also been reported inland. Pipeline leaks and spills associated with oil fields have contaminated rivers and surrounding ecosystems. These frequent leaks have caused economic losses for fishing communities who depend on coastal fisheries and have reported declining fish populations.

== Solutions ==
Many scholars suggest that increasing reliance on renewable energy sources could help address Venezuela's fuel shortages. Increasing consumption of energy in forms like wind, solar, and water would provide additional sources outside of oil and gasoline. These actions would also make Venezuela's general energy consumption more sustainable. Others propose veering away from the model of the rentier state and reimagining Venezuela's economy to be less dependent on resource revenue. Scholars argue this would require institutional reform and increasing institutional investments. A common proposal among residents for addressing the shortages lies in decentralizing PDVSA and redirecting less of its revenue to public welfare. Further, many Venezuelans believe that removing President Maduro would alleviate the country's crisis.

== See also ==
- Crisis in Venezuela
- Economy of Venezuela
- Shortages in Venezuela
- History of Venezuela
