= Healthcare in Venezuela =

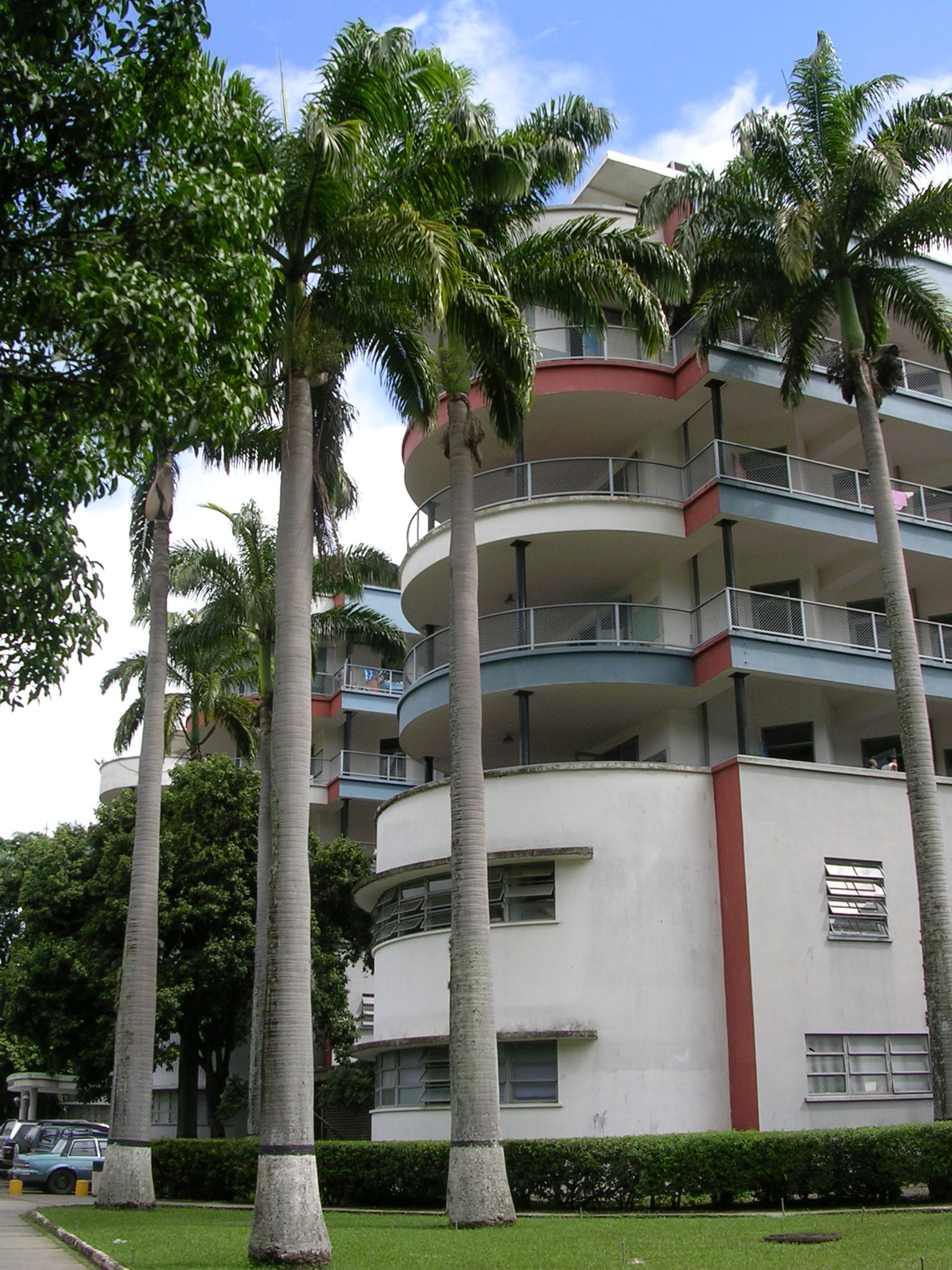
University Hospital, Central University of Venezuela

Venezuela currently faces a severe humanitarian crisis where families lack access to food and children face malnutrition. While the constitution affirms that the country offers free healthcare; in practice, medical treatment is mostly inaccessible. Inducing factors include improper equipment maintenance, deficient management of humanitarian aid, ludicrous work conditions, and political corruption.

== Pre-Bolivarian Revolution ==
=== 1970s ===
Venezuelan state governments operated only five facilities in 1979, down from about sixty hospitals in 1970 since the Ministry of Health and Social Assistance (MSAS) took over many of the hospitals.

In 1978, a presidential election year, medical sales in Venezuela hit an all-time high, but dropped in 1979. In 1979, there were approximately 250 hospitals in Venezuela with MSAS operating the majority of them (58%). Venezuela had a shortage of medical professionals and hospital beds in the late 1970s due to a large increase in the population and a lack of specialization among health care professionals. The lack of both professionals and beds was higher in the rural areas compared to the more populated, urban areas. Between 1978 and 1980, Venezuela had 14,771 doctors, 8,805 nurses and 2,804 nursing auxiliaries.

=== 1980s ===
Under President Luis Herrera Campins's Sixth National Plan, the government planned to increase medical funding by 9.7% annually between 1981 and 1985, with medical expenditures planned to reach $2.1 billion in 1985. $1.2 billion were designated to the construction of new facilities to combat bed shortages, with a main focus on establishing clinics in order to avoid the inefficiency of larger hospitals. The rehabilitation of handicapped individuals and a focus on addressing heart disease (the leading cause of death in Venezuela) were also highlighted in the Sixth National Plan. Medical professionals in Venezuela were "extremely U.S. oriented", with most doctors attending post-graduate work in the United States. These doctors were able to speak English, read U.S. medical journals, and attended gatherings of United States medical experts. In 1981, over 70% of health care services were administered by the government.

=== 1990s ===
Foreign medical equipment developed abroad was quickly adopted and shipped to Venezuela with most of the country's medical goods needing to be imported. In 1980, Venezuela imported 47% of its medical goods from the United States, 13% from Germany, 8% from Japan, and 3% from the United Kingdom. The majority of the medical equipment was distributed by a conglomerate of about 45 distributors known as the Asociación Venezolana de Distribuidores de Equipos Medicos (AVEDEM), while 15% of medical products were distributed by smaller entities.

From 1992 to 1993, there was a cholera epidemic in the Orinoco Delta and Venezuela's political leaders were accused of racial profiling of their own indigenous people to deflect blame from the country's institutions, thereby aggravating the epidemic. During the 1990s, the mortality rate was 318 per 100,000 population for diseases of the cardiac system, 156 for cancers, 634 for external causes (including drowning, self-harm, violence, falls, and road accidents), 1126 for communicable diseases (such as chest infections, syphilis, and meningitis), and 654 for certain conditions originating before birth.

== Bolivarian Revolution ==
Following the Bolivarian Revolution and the establishment of the Bolivarian government, improvements in healthcare were promising due to the installation of free healthcare facilities and programs, and the assistance of Cuban medical professionals. The Bolivarian government's failure to concentrate on healthcare, the reduction of healthcare spending, and government corruption eventually affected medical practices in Venezuela causing avoidable deaths along with an emigration of medical professionals to other countries. Venezuela's reliance on imported goods and its complicated exchange rates (initiated by Hugo Chávez) led to increasing shortages during the late-2000s and into the 2010s that affected the availability of medicines and medical equipment in the country.

=== 2000s ===
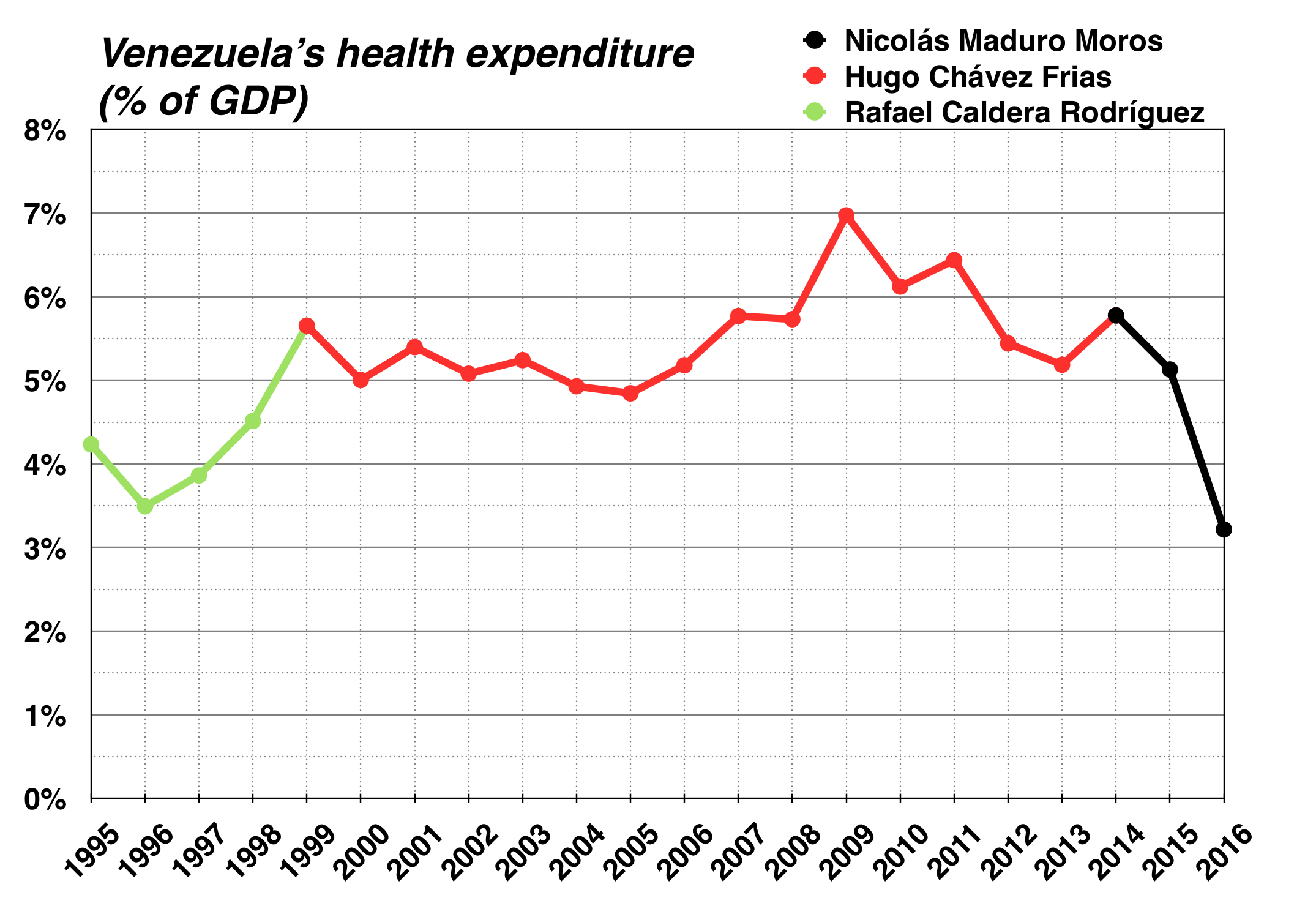
Healthcare spending by percentage of Venezuela's GDP

Several transmissible diseases, including dengue fever, malaria, measles, and tuberculosis, reappeared in Venezuela. In 1999 an estimated 62,000 Venezuelans were living with acquired immune deficiency syndrome (AIDS); and in 2001 an estimated 2,000 people died from AIDS. At the end of 2003, the percentage of the population between the ages of 15 and 49 with human immunodeficiency virus (HIV)/AIDS was 0.7. In 2000, 85% of the urban population and 70% of the rural population had access to improved water. Improved sanitation was available to 71% of the urban population and 48% of the rural population. In August 2001, President Hugo Chávez announced a national campaign to fight the dengue fever epidemic that had infected 24,000 and killed four. Child immunization for measles in 2002 (as a percentage of under 12 months) dropped to 78%, compared with 84% in 1999.

Throughout Hugo Chávez's presidency, the Health Ministry changed ministers multiple times. According to a high-ranking official of Venezuela's Health Ministry, the ministers were treated as scapegoats whenever issues with Venezuela's public health arose. The official also detailed ways Health Ministry officials would perform illicit acts in order to enrich themselves by selling goods designated for public healthcare.

=== 2010s ===
The Venezuelan government stopped publishing medical statistics in 2010.

In 2014 when Venezuela's economy was facing difficulties, Venezuela's healthcare system deteriorated. In August 2014, Venezuela was the only country in Latin America where the incidence of malaria was increasing. Venezuela registered the highest number of cases of malaria in the past 50 years, with 300 of 100,000 Venezuelans being infected with the disease. Medical shortages in the country also hampered the treatment of Venezuelans. Shortages of antiretroviral medicines to treat HIV/AIDS affected about 50,000 Venezuelans, potentially causing thousands of Venezuelans with HIV to develop AIDS. Venezuelans also stated that due to shortages of medicines, it was hard to find acetaminophen to help alleviate the newly introduced chikungunya virus, a potentially lethal mosquito-borne disease. In September 2014, Health Minister Nancy Pérez admitted that there were 45,745 cases of dengue fever. There were also contested estimates involving the number of Venezuelans infected with chikungunya. In September 2014, the Venezuelan government stated that only 400 Venezuelans were infected with chikungunya while the Central University of Venezuela stated that there could be between 65,000 and 117,000 Venezuelans infected. In August 2015 independent health monitors said that there were more than two million people infected with chikungunya while the government said there were 36,000 cases. In October 2014, President Maduro announced a plan to create the University of Science and Health and called for a meeting of ALBA in order to discuss the combat against the Ebola virus disease due to the Ebola virus epidemic in West Africa.

Into the Maduro presidency, the government could not supply enough money for medical supplies among healthcare providers, with doctors saying that 9 of 10 large hospitals had only 7% of required supplies and private doctors reporting numbers of patients that are "impossible" to count dying from easily treated illnesses due to the "downward sliding economy" in 2014. Many Venezuelans died avoidable deaths with medical professionals having scarce resources and using methods that were replaced decades ago. In February 2014, doctors at University of Caracas Medical Hospital stopped performing surgeries due to the lack of supplies, even though nearly 3,000 people required surgery.

In March 2014, the executive director of the Venezuelan Association of Hospitals and Clinics explained how in less than a month, shortages of 53 medical products rose to 109 and explained how the CADIVI system is to blame since 86% of supplies are imported with private sector hospitals claiming they owe suppliers billions of dollars in order to pay their debts.

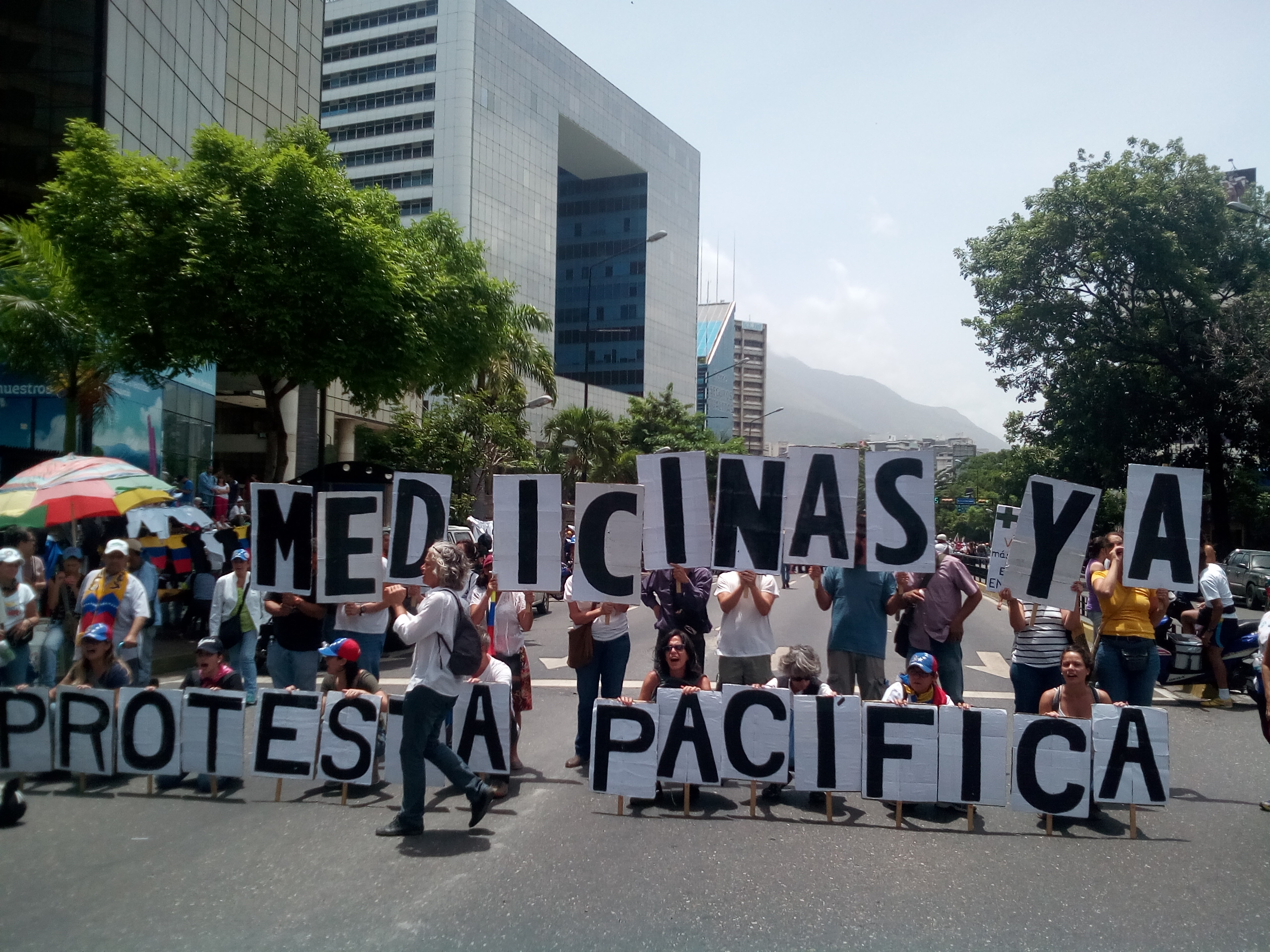
Venezuelans protesting in 2017 for medicine due to the shortages in Venezuela

In early 2015, only 35% of hospital beds were available and 50% of operating rooms could not function due to the lack of resources. In March 2015, a Venezuelan NGO, Red de Médicos por la Salud, reported that there was a 68% shortage of surgical supplies and a 70% shortage of medicines in Venezuelan pharmacies. In May 2015, the Venezuelan Medical Federation said that 15,000 doctors had left the public health care system due to drug and equipment shortages and poor pay. In August 2015 the Human Rights Watch said, “We have rarely seen access to essential medicines deteriorate as quickly as it has in Venezuela except in war zones.” By the end of 2015, the Bolivarian government reported that of all Venezuelans visiting public hospitals that year, one in three patients died. Also in 2015, 30% of all reported malaria cases in the Americas were in Venezuela (more than Brazil, which has a much larger population).

In 2016, according to the Venezuelan government, 240,000 cases of malaria were reported, rising 76% in a year. According to former Venezuelan health minister José Félix Oletta, more than 500,000 Venezuelans would contract malaria in 2017.

A study of 6,500 households by three of the main universities in Venezuela found that "74% of the population had lost on average nineteen pounds in 2016".

In April 2017 Venezuela's health ministry reported that maternal mortality jumped by 65% in 2016 and that the number of infant deaths rose by 30%. It also said that the number of cases of malaria was up by 76%. Shortly after Minister of Health Antonieta Caporale released in 2017 this data, and health statistics showing increases in 2016 infant and maternal mortality and infectious diseases, Maduro fired her and replaced the physician with a pharmacist close to vice-president Tareck El Aissami, Luis López Chejade. The publications were removed from the Ministry's website, and no further health data has been made available, although the government had produced health bulletins for several decades. The ministry had not reported health data in two years, and none has been reported since.

In November 2017 the Venezuelan Society of Public Health informed that a total of 857 cases of measles, from which 465 have been confirmed, had been registered. The Pan American Health Organization reported that at least 71% of the reported cases of measles in 2017 have occurred in Venezuela.

In 2018 Venezuela continued to suffer acute shortages of food and medicines.

In March 2019, The Wall Street Journal reported that the "collapse of Venezuela's health system, once one of the best in Latin America, has led to a surge in infant and maternal mortality rates and a return of rare diseases that were considered all but eradicated. In March 2019, Red Cross officials was reported that the "collapse" of the health system had caused the return of old and eradicated rare diseases like yellow fever, dengue, malaria, and tuberculosis, as well as a large increase in infant and maternal mortality rates. There was a concern that untreated migrants would begin to spread diseases to other countries. The United Nations estimated in 2019 that 2.8 million Venezuelans have healthcare needs, 300,000 are at risk of dying with cancer, diabetes or HIV as they have not had access to medicine for more than a year, and preventable diseases like diphtheria, malaria, measles and tuberculosis are rising in 2019, along with hepatitis A, because of sanitation and lack of access to water. The April 2019 HRW/Johns Hopkins report showed this rise in infectious and preventable diseases, as well as increasing malnutrition, infant and maternal death, and undertreatment of HIV. Inflation and medicine shortages have meant that patients are asked to bring their own food, water and soap, and medical supplies including scalpels and syringes.

=== 2020 ===
Venezuela was affected by COVID-19 pandemic on 13 March 2020.

== State and private ==
In 2008, private hospitals and clinics and the qualifications of their medical personnel were comparable to U.S. standards. Private health services were costly and overly full. The Venezuelan government accused private hospitals of profiteering. Two thousand doctors left the country between 2006 and 2008. A leading factor of this is the pitiful salaries of Venezuelan doctors. A typical doctor in Venezuela earns just $6.00 per month, amidst their current economic crisis

== See also ==
- Health in Venezuela
- Mission Barrio Adentro
- Operación Milagro
