= Shortages in Venezuela =

- Part of the crisis in Venezuela
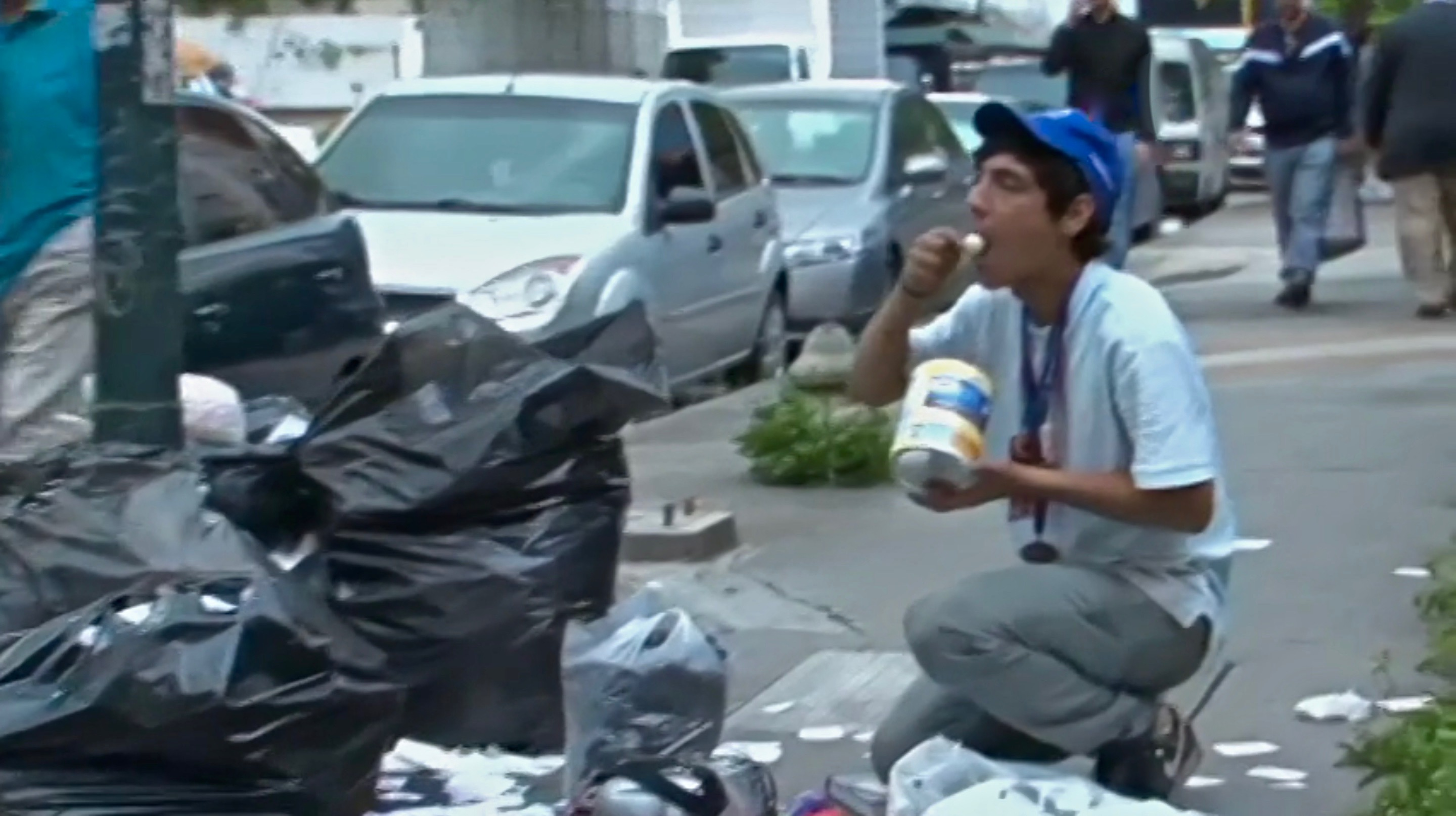
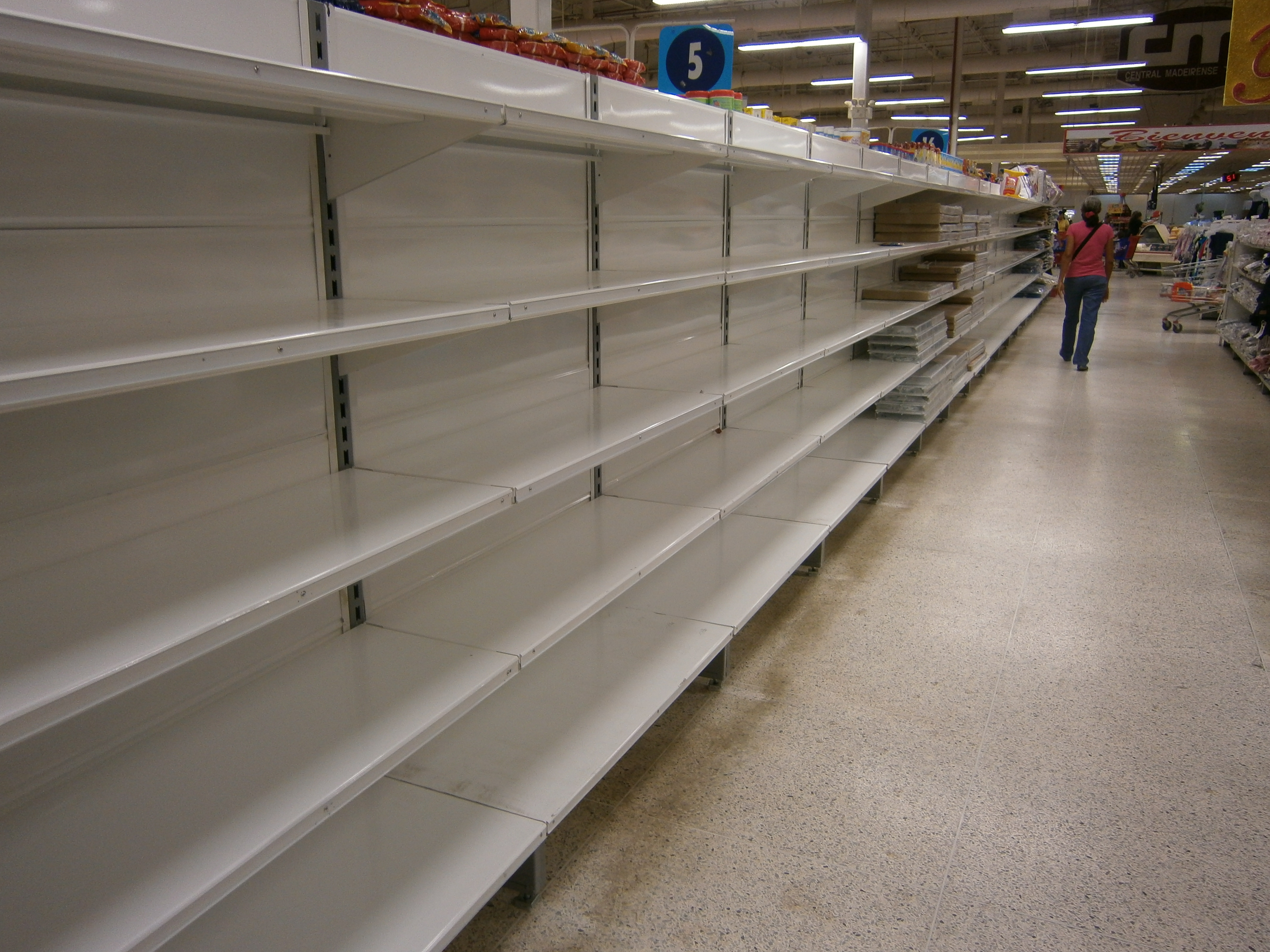
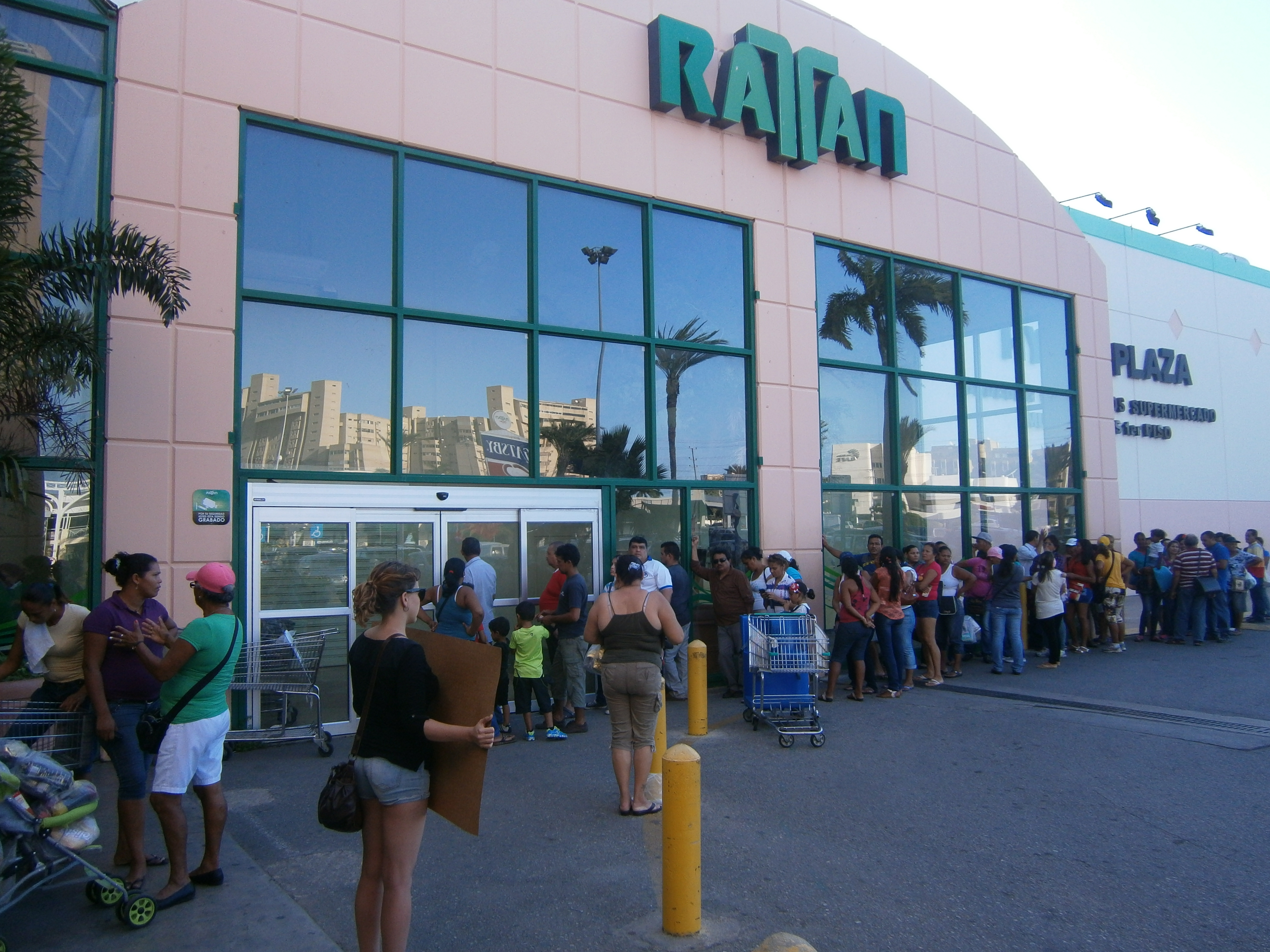
- Top to bottom, left to right: A man eating from garbage; empty shelves in a store; people lining up to enter a store
- Date: 2008 – present
- Location: Venezuela
- Cause: Government policies, low oil prices and corruption
- Outcome: Hunger, disease, civil unrest and refugee crisis; Maduro government relaxes currency exchange regulations

Shortages in Venezuela of food staples and basic necessities have occurred throughout Venezuela's history. Scarcity became more widespread following the enactment of price controls and other policies under the government of Hugo Chávez and exacerbated by the policy of withholding United States dollars from importers under the government of Nicolás Maduro. The severity of the shortages led to the largest refugee crisis ever recorded in the Americas.

The Maduro administration denied the extent of the crisis and refused to accept humanitarian aid from Amnesty International, the United Nations, and other groups while conditions worsened. The United Nations and the Organization of American States stated that the shortages resulted in preventable deaths in Venezuela and urged the government to accept humanitarian aid. Though The New York Times asserts that the Maduro administration and its economic irresponsibility directly caused a lack of food, Maduro stated that the country had adequate access to food.

During the shortages, milk, meat, coffee, rice, oil, precooked flour, butter, toilet paper, personal hygiene products, and medicines were scarce. By January 2017, the shortage of medicines reached 85%, according to the Pharmaceutical Federation of Venezuela (Federación Farmacéutica de Venezuela). Hours-long lines were common, and those who waited did not always receive service. Some Venezuelans resorted to eating wild fruit and garbage.

On 9 February 2018, a group of United Nations Special Procedures and the Special Rapporteurs on food, health, adequate housing and extreme poverty issued a joint statement on Venezuela, declaring that much of its population was starving and going without in a situation that they do not believe will end. A year later in 2019, the Maduro administration relaxed the nation's strict currency exchange regulations and shortages subsided in Venezuela while the economy became unofficially dollarized.

== History ==
=== Chávez administration ===
A video produced for El Tiempo explaining the shortages (2015)

Since the 1990s, food production in Venezuela has dropped continuously, with Hugo Chávez's Bolivarian government beginning to rely upon imported food using the country's then-large oil profits.

In 2003, the government created CADIVI (now CENCOEX), a currency control board charged with handling foreign exchange procedures to control capital flight by placing currency limits on individuals. Such currency controls were determined to be the cause of shortages according to many economists and other experts. However, the Venezuelan government blamed other entities such as the Central Intelligence Agency (CIA) and smugglers for shortages, stating that an "economic war" had been declared on Venezuela.

During the presidency of Chávez, Venezuela faced occasional shortages owing to high inflation and government financial inefficiencies. In 2005, Chávez announced the initiation of Venezuela's own "great leap forward", following the example of Mao Zedong's Great Leap Forward. An increase in shortages began to occur that year as 5% of items became unavailable according to the Central Bank of Venezuela. Common shortages in Venezuela started as early as 2008 in government-run food networks, such as Mercal and PDVAL. In January 2008, 24.7% of goods were reported to be unavailable in Venezuela, with the scarcity of goods remaining high until May 2008, when there was a shortage of 16.3% of goods. However, shortages increased again in January 2012 to nearly the same rate as in 2008.

=== Maduro administration ===
External image
- Contrasting satellite images of Puerto Cabello in February 2012 and June 2015, showing import shortages.

Following Chávez's death and the election of his successor Nicolás Maduro in 2013, shortage rates continued to increase and reached a record high of 28% in February 2014. Venezuela stopped reporting its shortage data after the rate stood at 28%. In January 2015, the hashtag #AnaquelesVaciosEnVenezuela (or #EmptyShelvesInVenezuela) was the number one trending topic on Twitter in Venezuela for two days, with Venezuelans posting pictures of empty store shelves around the country.

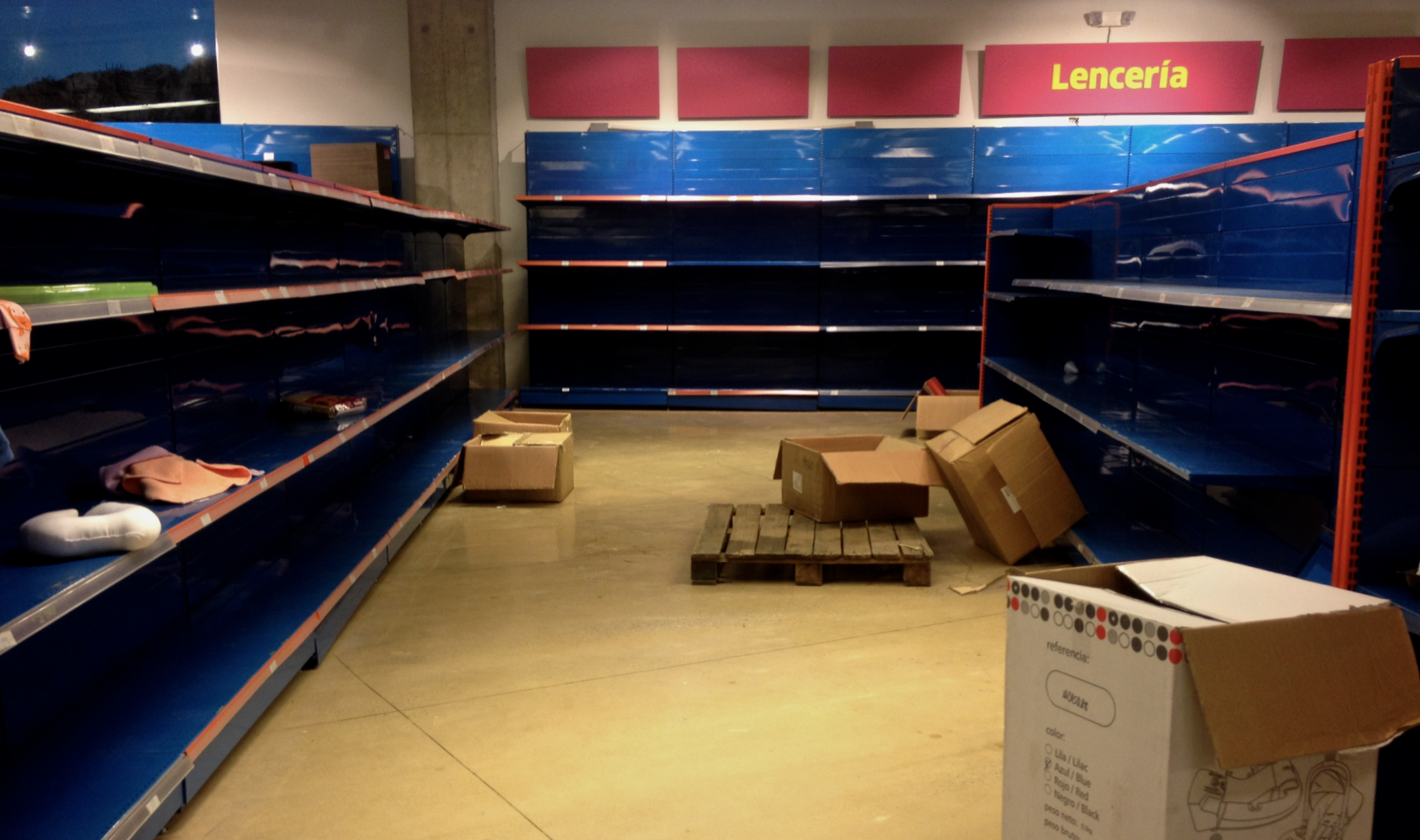
An empty Venezuelan store following the Dakazo in November 2013

In August 2015, American private intelligence agency company Stratfor used two satellite images of Puerto Cabello, Venezuela's main port used for importing goods, to show how severe shortages had become in Venezuela. One image from February 2012 showed the ports full of shipping containers when the Venezuelan government's spending was near a historic high before the 2012 Venezuela presidential election. A second image from June 2015 shows the port with many fewer containers, since the Venezuelan government could no longer afford to import goods, as oil revenues dropped. At the end of 2015, it was estimated there was a shortage of over 75% of goods in Venezuela.

By May 2016, experts feared that Venezuela was possibly entering a period of famine, with President Maduro encouraging Venezuelans to cultivate their own food. In January 2016, it was estimated, that the food scarcity rate (indicador de escasez) was between 50% and 80%. The newly elected National Assembly, composed primarily of opposition delegates, declared a national food crisis a month later in February 2016. Many Venezuelans then began to suffer from shortages of common utilities, such as electricity and water, because of the prolonged period of mishandling and corruption under the Maduro government. By July 2016, Venezuelans desperate for food moved to the Colombian border. Over 500 women stormed past Venezuelan National Guard troops into Colombia looking for food on 6 July 2016. By 10 July 2016, Venezuela temporarily opened its borders, which had been closed since August 2015, for 12 hours. Over 35,000 Venezuelans traveled to Colombia for food within that period. Between 16–17 July, over 123,000 Venezuelans crossed into Colombia seeking food. The Colombian government set up what it called a "humanitarian corridor" to welcome Venezuelans. Around the same time in July 2016, reports of desperate Venezuelans rummaging through garbage for food appeared.

Video of Venezuelans eating from garbage in August 2015

By early 2017, priests began telling Venezuelans to label their garbage so needy individuals could feed on their refuse. In March 2017, despite having the largest oil reserves in the world, some regions of Venezuela began having shortages of gasoline with reports that fuel imports had begun. The government continued to deny there was a humanitarian crisis, instead saying there was simply less availability of food. Yván Gil, vice minister of relations to the European Union, said that an economic war had affected "the availability of food, but [Venezuela is] still within the thresholds set by the UN". Following targeted sanctions by the United States government in late-2017 due to the controversial Constituent National Assembly elections, the Maduro government began to blame the United States for shortages. It enacted 'Plan Rabbit', encouraging Venezuelans to breed rabbits, slaughter them and eat their meat.

By early 2018, gasoline shortages began to spread, with hundreds of drivers in some regions waiting in lines to fill their tanks, sleeping overnight in their vehicles during the process. In a September 2018 Meganálisis survey, nearly one-third of Venezuelans stated they consumed only one meal per day while 78.6 percent of respondents said they had issues with food security.

The Wall Street Journal reported in March 2019 that parts of barrio La Vega had been without water for almost a year; residents of the town of 120,000 said that water trucks come by infrequently, sometimes only to supply government supporters.

==== Relaxed currency regulations ====
Following increased international sanctions throughout 2019 during the Venezuelan presidential crisis, the Maduro government relaxed price and currency control policies established by Chávez, which resulted in the country seeing a rebound from economic decline. After the Maduro administration enacted less strict currency regulations, shortages in Venezuela subsided.

In a November 2019 interview with José Vicente Rangel, President Nicolás Maduro described dollarization as an "escape valve" that helps the recovery of the country, the spread of productive forces in the country and the economy. However, Maduro said that the Venezuelan bolívar will still remain as the national currency.

== Causes ==
=== Government policies ===
==== Overspending and import reliance ====
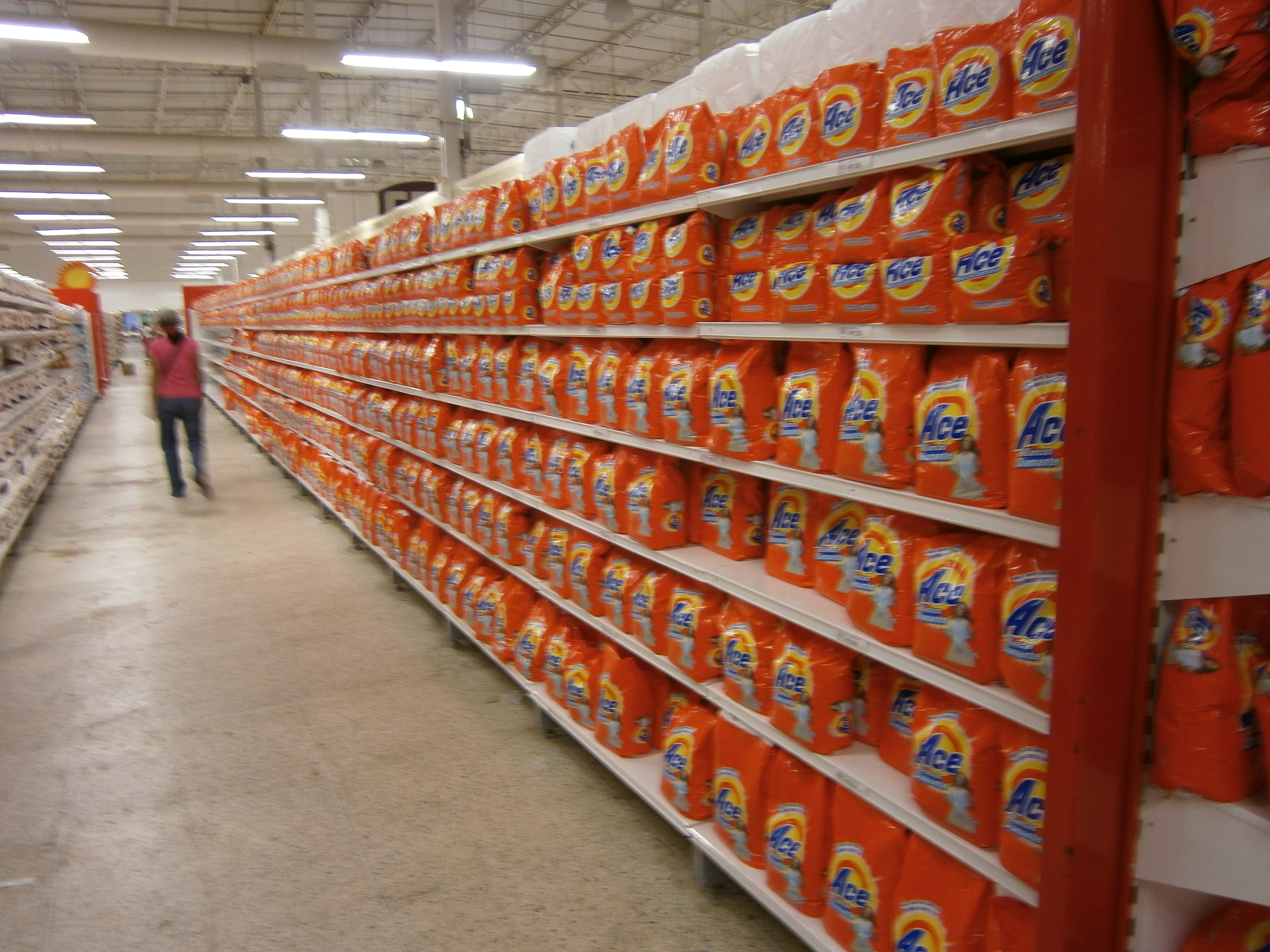
Shelves filled with the same type of product

President Hugo Chávez's policies relied heavily on oil revenues to fund large quantities of imports. Production under Chávez dropped because of his price control policies and poorly managed expropriations. His successor, Nicolás Maduro, continued most of Chávez's policies until they became unsustainable. When oil profits began declining in 2014, Maduro began limiting imports needed by Venezuelans and shortages began to grow. Foreign reserves, usually saved for economic distress, were being spent to service debt and to avoid default, instead of being used to purchase imported goods. Domestic production, which had already been damaged by government policies, was unable to replace the necessary imported goods.

According to economist Ángel Alayón, the availability of food throughout Venezuela is directly controlled and distributed by the government, even that through private companies. Alayón states the problem is not distribution, however, but production; he claims that nothing is being produced so over-regulation of distributors is irrelevant. Expropriations by the government resulted in a drop in production in Venezuela. According to Miguel Angel Santos, a researcher at the Kennedy School of Government at Harvard University, the industry of goods production in Venezuela was destroyed as a result of expropriations of private means of production since 2004, while a growth in import consumerism occurred when Venezuela had abundant oil money. The drop of oil prices beginning in 2014 made it impossible for the government to import necessary goods for Venezuelans, though by this point the country was largely reliant on imports.

==== Currency and price controls ====
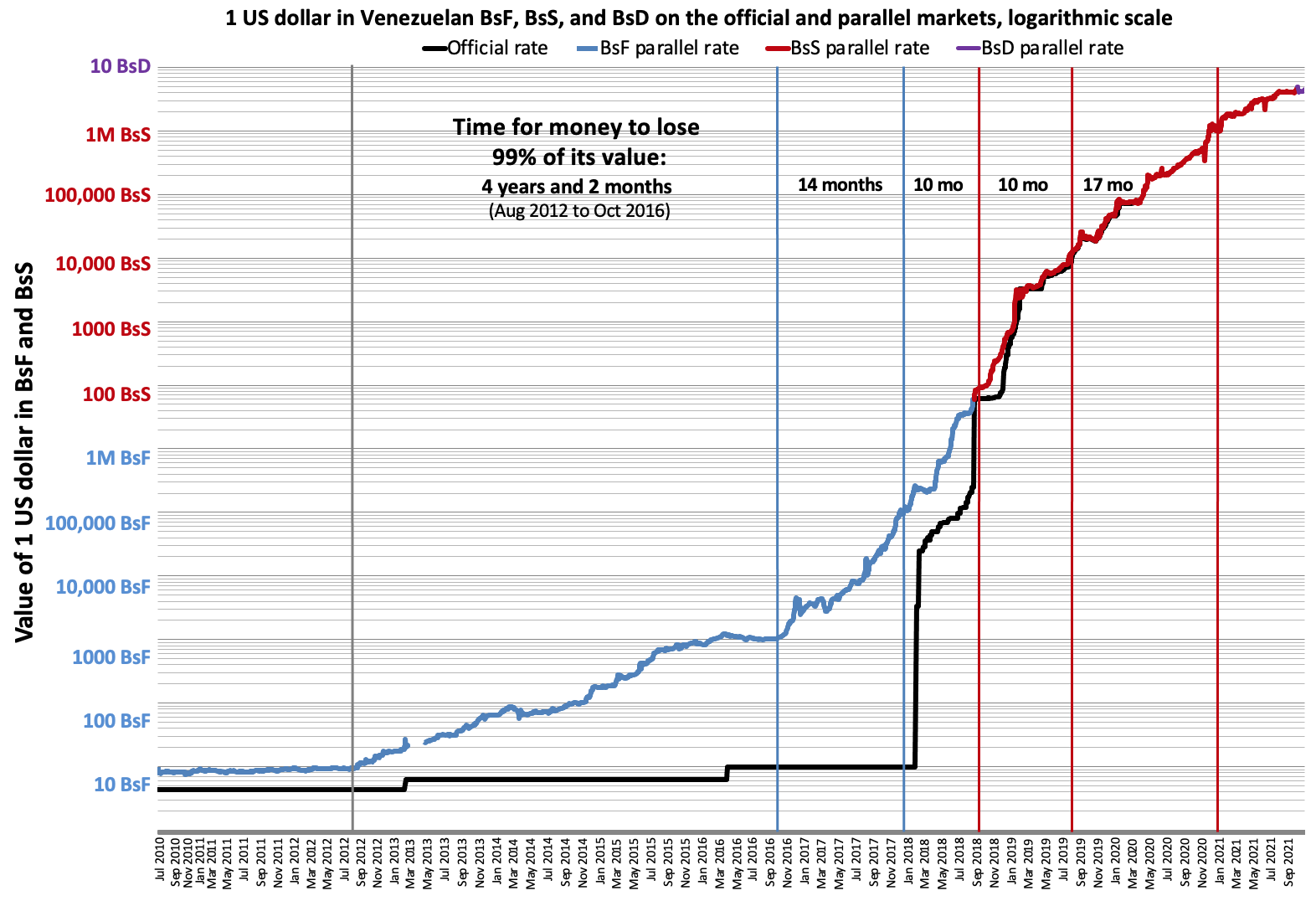
The value of one US dollar in Venezuelan bolívares (VEF) on the black market through time, according to DolarToday.com. Blue vertical lines represent every time the currency lost 90% of its value relative to the US dollar since the last one. This happened four times since 2012, meaning that the currency is worth, as of December 2017, less than one ten-thousandth of what it was worth five years ago, since it has lost 99.99% of its value. The rate at which the value is lost (inflation) is rapidly accelerating. The first time the money took two years and two months (an implied monthly inflation rate of 9.3%) to lose 90% of its value, the second time one year and 10 months (implied rate 11% m/m), the third time only 10 months (implied rate 26% m/m), and the fourth time a mere four months (implied rate 77% m/m).

In the first few years Chávez was in office, his newly created social programs required large amounts of funding to make the desired changes. On 5 February 2003, the government created CADIVI, a currency control board charged with handling foreign exchange transactions. It was created to control the flight of capital from the country by placing limits on the amount of foreign currency individuals could purchase. The Chávez administration also enacted agricultural measures that caused food imports to rise dramatically. This slowed domestic production of beef, rice, and milk. With Venezuela's reliance on imports and its lack of US dollars to pay for them, shortages resulted.

With limits on foreign currency, a currency black market developed since Venezuelan merchants relied on the import of goods that required payments with reliable foreign currencies. As Venezuela printed more money for their social programs, the bolívar continued to devalue for Venezuelan citizens and merchants since the government held most of the more reliable currencies. Because merchants could purchase only limited amounts of necessary foreign currency from the Venezuelan government, they resorted to the black market. This in turn raised the merchant's costs which resulted in price increases for consumers. The high black market rates made it difficult for businesses to purchase necessary goods or earn profits since the government often forced them to make price cuts. Maduro's government increased price controls after inflation grew and shortages of basic goods worsened. He called the policy an economic counterattack against the "parasitic bourgeoisie". Price regulators, with military backing, forced businesses to lower prices on everything from electronics to toys. For example, Venezuelan McDonald's franchises began offering a Big Mac meal for 69 bolivars or $10.90 in January 2014, though only making $1 at the black market rate. Since businesses made lower profits, this led to further shortages because they could not afford to pay to import or produce the goods that Venezuela relies on.

With the short supply of foreign currencies and Venezuela's reliance on imports, debt is created. Without settling its outstanding debt, Venezuela could not import the materials necessary for domestic production. Without such imports, more shortages were created since there was an increasing lack of production as well.

==== Corruption ====
Following mass looting in June 2016 due to shortages which resulted in the deaths of at least three, on 12 July 2016, President Maduro granted Defense Minister Vladimir Padrino López the power to oversee product transportation, price controls, and the Bolivarian missions. He also had his military oversee five of Venezuela's main ports. Maduro's actions made Padrino one of the most powerful people in Venezuela.

An Associated Press investigation published in December 2016 found that the military was involved in schemes to benefit from food scarcity rather than help assuage it. Military sellers would drastically increase the cost of goods and create shortages by hoarding products. Ships containing imports would often be held at bay until military officials at Venezuela's ports were paid off. Officials bypassed standard practices, such as performing health inspections, pocketing money normally spent on such certificates. One anonymous businessman who participated in the lucrative food dealings with Venezuelan military officials, and had contracts valued at $131 million between 2012 and 2015, showed the Associated Press his accounts for his business in Venezuela. The government would contract him for more than double the actual cost for products. For example, one corn contract of $52 million would be $20 million more than the market average. Then the businessman had to use the extra money to pay military personnel to import such products. The businessman said he had been paying millions of dollars to military officials for years, and that the food minister, Gen. Rodolfo Marco Torres, once had to be paid $8 million just to import goods into Venezuela. Documents seen by the Associated Press showing prices for corn also revealed that the government budgeted $118 million in July 2016, an overpayment of $50 million over average market prices for that month.

According to retired general Antonio Rivero, Maduro allowed the military to control their schemes, which made them less rebellious by giving them the resources to feed their families, among other benefits. The military also used currency control licenses to obtain dollars at a lower exchange rate than the average Venezuelan. The military shared the licenses with friendly businessmen to import very few goods with the cheaper dollars while pocketing the remaining dollars. Documents show that General Rodolfo Marco Torres had given contracts to potential shell companies. Two companies, the Panamanian located Atlas Systems and J.A. Comercio de Generous Alimenticios diverted $5.5 million to Swiss accounts of two brothers-in-law of then-food minister, General Carlos Osorio in 2012 and 2013.

In late January 2017, members of the United States Congress responded to the Associated Press investigation, suggested making targeted sanctions against corrupt Venezuelan officials who had taken advantage of the food shortages and participated in graft. Democratic Senator of Maryland and ranking member of the Foreign Relations Committee Ben Cardin stated, "When the military is profiting off of food distribution while the Venezuelan people increasingly starve, corruption has reached a new level of depravity that cannot go unnoticed." Senator Marco Rubio said that, "This should be one of President Trump's first actions in office."

==== Medical care used for political gain ====
According to an article in The New York Times, medical care was withheld for political gain. Mission Barrio Adentro was a program established by Chávez to bring medical care to poor neighborhoods; it was staffed by Cubans that were sent to Venezuela in exchange for petroleum. The New York Times interviewed sixteen Cuban medical professionals in 2019 who had worked for Barrio Adentro prior to the 2018 Venezuelan presidential elections; all sixteen revealed that they were required to participate in voting fraud. They "described a system of deliberate political manipulation"; their services as medical professionals "were wielded to secure votes for the governing Socialist Party, often through coercion", they told The New York Times. Facing a shortage of supplies and medicine, they were instructed to withhold treatment–even for emergencies–so supplies and treatment could be "doled out closer to the election, part of a national strategy to compel patients to vote for the government". They reported that life-saving treatment was denied to patients who supported the opposition. As the election neared, they were sent door-to-door, on house visits with a political purpose: "to hand out medicine and enlist voters for Venezuela's Socialist Party". Patients were warned that they could lose their medical care if they did not vote for the socialist party, and that, if Maduro lost, ties would be broken with Cuba, and Venezuelans would lose all medical care. Patients with chronic conditions, at risk of death if they couldn't get medicine, were a particular focus of these tactics. One said that government officials were posing as doctors to make these house calls before elections; 'We, the doctors, were asked to give our extra robes to people. The fake doctors were even giving out medicines, without knowing what they were or how to use them," he said.

=== Government explanations ===
==== Smuggling ====
In an interview with President Maduro by The Guardian, it was noted that a "significant proportion" of the subsidized basic goods in short supply were being smuggled into Colombia and sold for far higher prices. The Venezuelan government claimed that as much as 40% of the basic commodities it subsidizes for the domestic market were being disposed of in this manner. However, economists disagreed with the Venezuelan government's claim saying that only 10% of subsidized products are smuggled out of the country. Reuters noted that the creation of currency controls and subsidies were the main factors contributing to smuggling.

Following President Maduro's move to grant the military control of Venezuela's food infrastructure, military personnel sold contraband into Colombia. One member, 1st Lt. Luis Alberto Quero Silva of the Venezuelan National Guard, was arrested for possessing three tons of flour, which was likely part of a more elaborate grift operation among the country's military.

==== Food consumption ====
In 2013, the president of the Venezuelan government's Instituto Nacional de Estadística (INE) Elias Eljuri, referring to a national survey, suggested that toilet paper shortages in the country were due to Venezuelans' eating more. Data provided by the Venezuelan government's statistical office instead showed that in 2013, food consumption by Venezuelans actually decreased. By March 2016, 87% of Venezuelans were reportedly consuming less due to the shortages they faced. As of 2016, the average Venezuelan living in extreme poverty lost nearly 19 pounds due to lack of food. In March 2017, a basket of basic grocery items cost four times the monthly minimum wage and by April, more than 11% of the children in the country suffered from malnutrition. By 2018, more than 30 percent of Venezuelans were only eating one meal per day.

== Response ==
=== Censorship and denial ===
The Venezuelan government often censored and denied health information and statistics surrounding the crisis. Doctors received threats not to release malnutrition data. In one case in "the Ministry of Health's 2015 annual report, the mortality rate for children under 4 weeks old had increased a hundredfold, from 0.02 percent in 2012 to just over 2 percent". The government responded to the release of this information on the Ministry's website saying it had been hacked. The information was taken down from the Internet, the health minister was fired, and the military was put in charge of Venezuela's health ministry. The Maduro government focused on providing goods to the capital city, Caracas, while outlying regions of Venezuela experienced more shortages.

President Maduro said he recognized there is hunger in Venezuela, though he blamed it on an economic war. Yván Gil, Venezuela's vice minister of relations to the European Union, denied a "humanitarian crisis". Instead he stated there was simply "a decrease in the availability of food", saying an "economic war" had affected "the availability of food, but we are still within the thresholds set by the UN". In an Al Jazeera interview with president of the Constituent Assembly Delcy Rodríguez, she stated, "I have denied and continue denying that Venezuela has a humanitarian crisis". As a result, international intervention in Venezuela would not be justified. She also described statements by Venezuelans calling for international assistance as "treasonous".

=== Rationing ===
==== Food ====
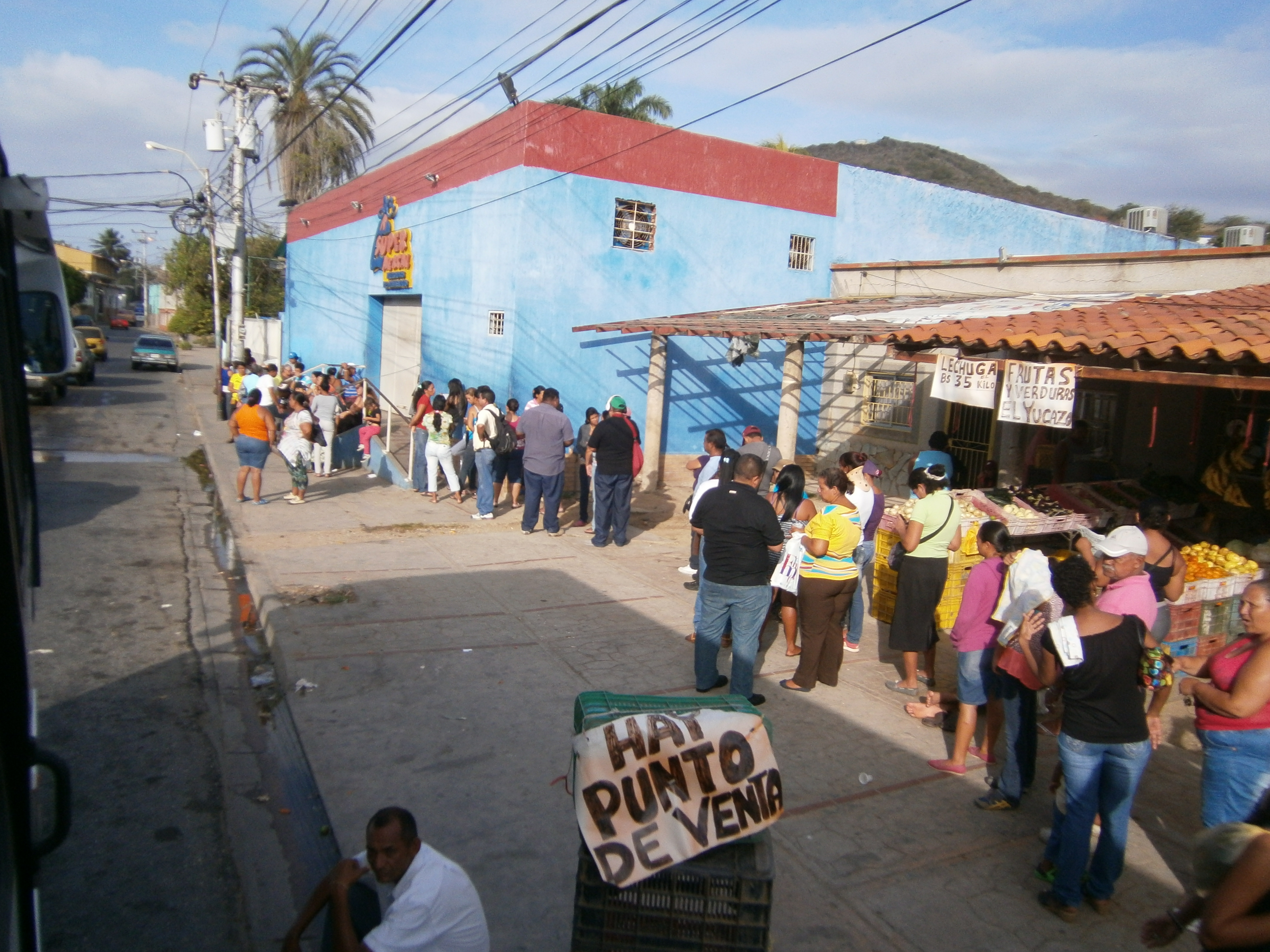
Shoppers waiting in line at a Mercal store for government subsidized products in March 2014

Economists state the Venezuelan government began rationing in 2014 for several reasons including an unproductive domestic industry that had been negatively affected by nationalization and government intervention, and confusing currency controls that made it unable to provide the dollars importers needed to pay for all of the basic products that enter Venezuela. According to Venezuelan residents, the government also rationed public water to those who used water over 108 hours a week because of the nation's poor water delivery systems. Gasoline was also rationed allegedly because subsidized Venezuelan gasoline was being smuggled to Colombia where it was sold for a higher price.

In February 2014, the government said it had confiscated more than 3,500 tons of contraband food and fuel at the border with Colombia, which it said was intended for "smuggling" or "speculation". The president of the National Assembly, Diosdado Cabello, said the confiscated food should be given to the Venezuelan people and should not be "in the hands of these gangsters". One month later, President Maduro introduced a "biometric card" called Tarjeta de Abastecimiento Seguro, that required the user's fingerprint for purchases in state-run supermarkets or participating businesses. The device was allegedly meant to combat smuggling and price speculation. It was described as being both like a loyalty program and a ration card. In May 2014, months after the card was introduced, it was reported that 503,000 Venezuelans had registered for it. In August 2014, it was reported that the Tarjeta de Abastecimiento Seguro failed to move past the trial phase, and that another "biometric card" was going to be developed according to President Maduro.

Soon after, in August 2014, President Maduro announced the creation of a new voluntary fingerprint scanning system that was allegedly aimed at combating food shortages and smuggling. The Venezuelan government announced that 17,000 troops would be deployed along its border with Colombia. They were to assist in closing down traffic each night to strengthen anti-smuggling efforts. The effect of the nightly closings was to be assessed after 30 days. Following large shortages in January 2015, Makro announced that some stores would begin using fingerprint systems and that customers would be rationed both daily and monthly.

==== Utilities ====
The blackouts are just more evidence of an utterly dysfunctional government ... This is a government that is not governing.

— Michael Shifter, president of Inter-American Dialogue

Rationing of electricity and water began to increase into 2016. Water shortages in Venezuela resulted in the government mandating the rationing of water. Many Venezuelans no longer had access to water piped to their homes and instead relied on the government to provide water a few times monthly. Desperate Venezuelans often displayed their frustrations through protests and began to steal water "from swimming pools, public buildings, and even tanker trucks" to survive. Due to the water shortages, there were "increased [numbers of] cases of diseases such as scabies, malaria, diarrhea and amoebiasis in the country", according to Miguel Viscuña, Director of Epidemiology of the Health Corporation of Central Miranda

Venezuela also experienced shortages of electricity and was plagued by common blackouts. On 6 April 2016, President Maduro ordered public workers not to go to work believing it would cut down on energy consumption. However, the workers actually used more energy in their homes using air conditioning, electronics and appliances. On 15 April 2016, President Nicolás Maduro announced that Venezuela would reverse Chávez's time change introduced in 2007 due to the shortage of electricity (the country's hydroelectric power experienced low water levels) in Venezuela, with a return to UTC−04:00 which began on 1 May 2016 at 03:00:00. On 20 April 2016, the government ordered the rationing of electricity in ten Venezuelan states, including the capital city of Caracas; This followed after other attempts to curb electricity usage including moving Venezuela's time zone ahead and telling Venezuelan women to stop using hairdryers had failed. Two days later, on 22 April 2016, the minister of electricity, Luis Motta Dominguez, announced that beginning the following week, forced blackouts would occur throughout Venezuela four hours per day for the next 40 days.

During prolonged blackouts in early 2019, power, water and necessities became increasingly scarce or completely unavailable in certain areas. To counter this, on 1 April, Maduro announced power rationing that would last for 30 days. It was hoped that this would preserve power for the areas that needed it most, prevent more blackouts, and make water, oil, and food more accessible as a result – the water lines were also out of service, whilst oil refineries, food production plants, and refrigeration shut down. Part of the power rationing plan was to end the workday at 2 pm. In a tweet, the National Assembly President and Interim President of Venezuela Juan Guaidó said that rationing wasn't actually happening, and suggested that power was being diverted from smaller cities in Venezuela to Caracas to give the illusion that Maduro had fixed the problem after the fourth blackout. Guaidó also said that "anti-Maduro leaders" had made deals to import power through Colombia and Brazil to temporarily solve the problem, because there wasn't enough power even to ration.

==== Reaction to rationing ====
Venezuelan consumers had mainly negative feelings toward the fingerprint rationing system, saying it created longer lines, especially when fingerprint machines malfunctioned. They felt the system did nothing to relieve shortages because the large economic changes the country needed to make were simply overlooked. Following the announcement of the fingerprint system, protests broke out denouncing the proposed move in many cities in Venezuela. The MUD opposition coalition called on Venezuelans to reject the new fingerprinting system and called on supporters to hold a nationwide cacerolazo (a noisy form of protest). These were primarily held in areas that traditionally opposed the government. Students in Zulia state also demonstrated against the proposed system. Lorenzo Mendoza, the president of Empresas Polar, Venezuela's largest food producer, expressed his disagreement with the proposed system, saying it would penalize 28 million Venezuelans for the smuggling carried out by just a few. Days after the announcement, the Venezuelan government scaled back its plans for implementing the new system, saying it was now voluntary and is only for 23 basic goods.

Despite public displeasure with the system, in an October 2014 Wall Street Journal article, it was reported that the fingerprint rationing system had expanded to more state-owned markets.

=== Supplier seizures ===
In 2013, the government of Venezuela seized the Manufactora de Papel toilet paper factory in an attempt to reduce shortages; it had also seized several large farms to try to address food shortages.

=== Local Supply and Production Committee (CLAP) ===
According to Aristóbulo Istúriz, who was Vice President of Venezuela, the government-operated Local Supply and Production Committees (CLAP) that provides food to Venezuelans in need, are a "political instrument to defend the revolution". Allegations arose that only supporters of Maduro and the government were provided food, while critics were denied access to goods. PROVEA, a Venezuelan human rights group, described CLAPs as "a form of food discrimination that is exacerbating social unrest".

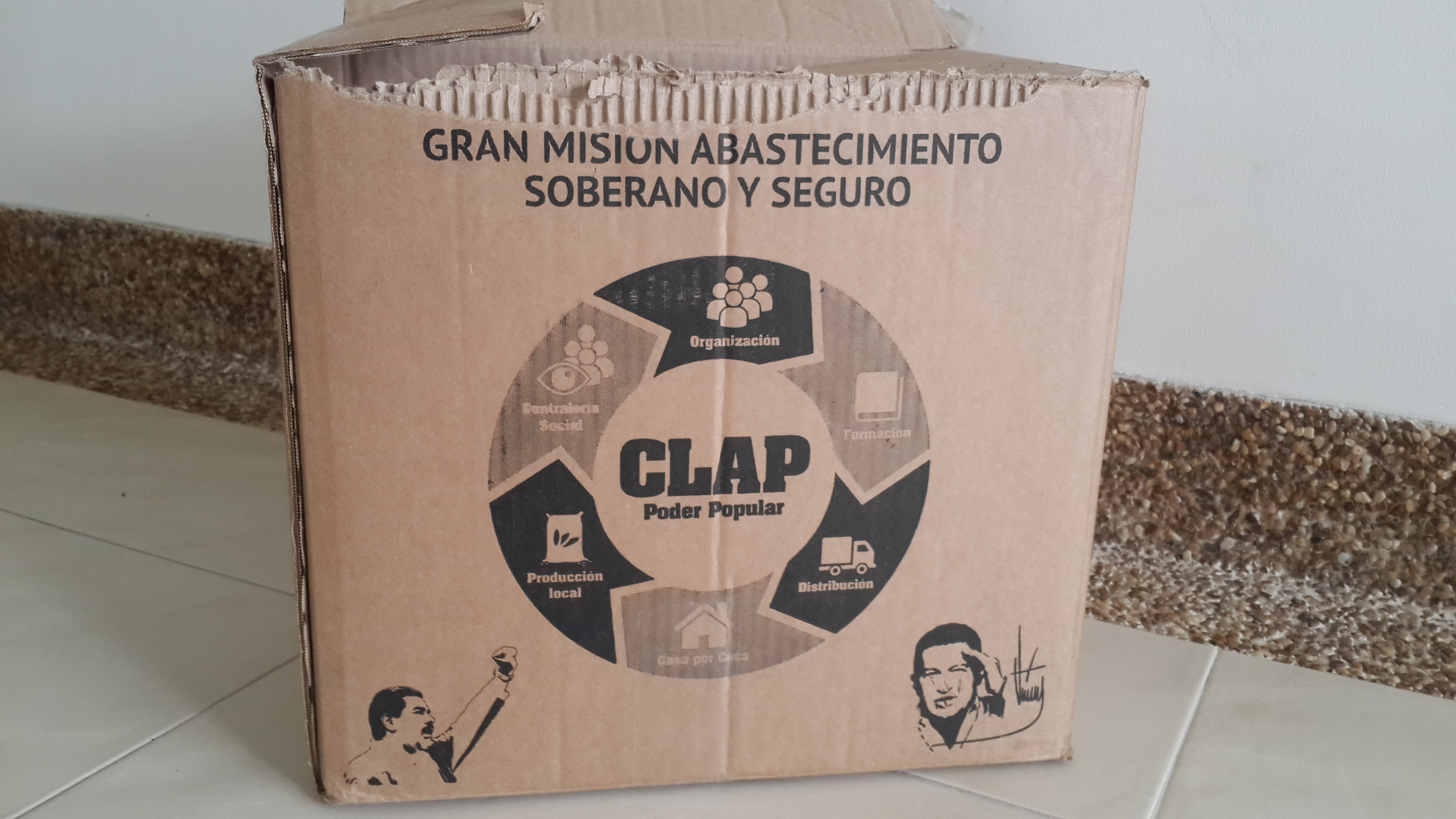
A food box provided by CLAP, with the supplier receiving government funds owned by President Nicolas Maduro

Luisa Ortega Díaz, Chief Prosecutor of Venezuela from 2007 to 2017 revealed that President Maduro had profited from the food crisis. CLAP made contracts with Group Grand Limited, a Mexican entity owned by Maduro through frontmen Rodolfo Reyes, Álvaro Uguedo Vargas and Alex Saab. Group Grand Limited would sell foodstuffs to CLAP and receive government funds.

On 19 April 2018, after a multilateral meeting between over a dozen European and Latin American countries, United States Department of the Treasury officials stated that they had collaborated with Colombian officials to investigate corrupt import programs of the Maduro administration including CLAP. They explained that Venezuelan officials pocketed 70% of the proceeds allocated for importation programs destined to alleviate hunger in Venezuela. Treasury officials said they sought to seize the proceeds that were being funneled into the accounts of corrupt Venezuelan officials and hold them for a possible future government in Venezuela. A month later, on 17 May 2018, the Colombian government seized 25,200 CLAP boxes containing about 400 tons of decomposing food, which was destined for distribution to the Venezuelan public. The Colombian government said they were investigating shell companies and money laundering related to CLAP operations, and claimed the shipment was to be used to buy votes during the 2018 Venezuelan presidential election.

On 18 October 2018, Mexican prosecutors accused the Venezuelan government and Mexican individuals of buying poor quality food products for CLAP and exporting them to Venezuela, doubling their value for sale. Suspects investigated by the Mexican government offered to pay $3 million to the United Nations refugee agency, UNHCR.

On 4 February 2019, the new president Juan Guaidó cautioned that the Maduro government had plans to steal the products for humanitarian purposes that entered the country, including plans to distribute these products through the government's food distribution program CLAP.

== Effects ==
=== Arbitrage and hoarding ===
As a result of the shortages and price controls, arbitrage (or bachaqueo), the ability to buy low and sell high, came about in Venezuela. For example, goods subsidized by the Venezuelan government were smuggled out of the country and sold for a profit. Hoarding also increased as Venezuelan consumers grew nervous over shortages.

=== Crime ===
Individuals resorted to violent theft to acquire items that shortages made difficult to obtain. Venezuelan motorcycle organizations reported that their members were murdered for their motorcycles due to the shortage of motorcycles and spare parts. There were also reports of Venezuelan authorities being killed for their weapons, and trucks full of goods being attacked to steal desirable merchandise they are carrying.

Shortages were so chronic that crime decreased because of them; since there was less cash in banks, there were fewer bank robberies. There were fewer cars circulating due to the high price of imported parts, and guns for criminals were increasingly expensive, meaning that robbers needed to kill authorities in order to obtain a weapon.

=== Housing ===
Beginning in the mid-2000s during Chávez's presidency, Venezuela experienced a housing crisis. In 2005, the Venezuelan Construction Chamber (CVC) estimated that there was a shortage of 1.6 million homes, with only 10,000 of 120,000 promised homes constructed by Chávez's government despite billions of dollars in investments. Poor Venezuelans attempted to construct homes on their own despite structural risks.

By 2011, there was a housing shortage of 2 million homes, with nearly twenty prime developments being occupied by squatters following Chávez's call for the poor to occupy "unused land". Up to 2011, only 500,000 homes were constructed during the Chávez administration, with over two-thirds of the new housing developments being built by private companies; his government provided about the same amount of housing as previous administrations. Housing shortages were further exacerbated when private construction halted due to the fear of property expropriations and because of the government's inability to construct and provide housing. Urban theorist and author Mike Davis said in July 2011 to The Guardian, "Despite official rhetoric, the Bolivarianist regime has undertaken no serious redistribution of wealth in the cities and oil revenues pay for too many other programmes and subsidies to leave room for new housing construction." By 2012, a shortage of building materials also disrupted construction, with metal production at a 16-year low. By the end of Chávez's presidency in 2013, the number of Venezuelans in inadequate housing had grown to 3 million.

Under the Maduro government, housing shortages continued to worsen. Maduro announced in 2014 that due to the shortage of steel, abandoned cars and other vehicles would be acquired by the government and melted to provide rebar for housing. In April 2014, Maduro ruled by decree that Venezuelans who owned three or more rental properties would be forced by the government to sell their rental units at a set price or they would face fines or have their property possessed by the government. By 2016, residents of government-provided housing, who were usually supporters of the government, began protesting due to the lack of utilities and food.

=== Hunger ===
The government originally took pride in its reduction of malnutrition when it had oil revenues to fund its social spending in the 2000s. However, by 2016, the majority of Venezuelans were eating less and spending the majority of their wages on food. A 2016 survey by the Bengoa Foundation found nearly 30% of children malnourished. According to nutritionist Héctor Cruces, generations of Venezuelans will be affected by the shortages becoming malnourished, causing stunted growth. Venezuelans' immune systems were also weakened due to the lack of food intake, while the lack of water also caused hygienic issues.

Hunger has stalked Venezuela for years. Now, it is killing the nation's children at an alarming rate...

— The New York Times, 2017

The New York Times stated in a 2016 article "Venezuelans Ransack Stores as Hunger Grips the Nation" that "Venezuela is convulsing from hunger ... The nation is anxiously searching for ways to feed itself". The hunger Venezuelans often experienced resulted in growing discontent that culminated with protests and looting.

A 2017 report by The New York Times explained how hunger had begun to become so extreme in the country that hundreds of children began to die throughout Venezuela. That year, cases of malnutrition rose sharply as years of economic mismanagement began to grow deadlier. Nearly every hospital in Venezuela stated they did not have enough baby formula, while 63% said they had no baby formula at all.

Many Venezuelans resorted to extreme measures to feed themselves, including eating garbage and wild fruits, and selling personal possessions for money to buy food. By the end of 2016, more than three-quarters of Venezuelans had lost weight because of their inadequate food intake, with about the same proportion of people saying they had lost 8.5 kg (19 lb) from a lack of food in 2016 alone. In 2017, studies found that 64% of Venezuelans saw a reduction in weight, with 61% saying they go to sleep hungry, while the average Venezuelan lost 12 kg (26 lb). Dozens of deaths were reported to be the result of Venezuelans resorting to eating harmful and poisonous substances, such as bitter yuca, in order to curb starvation.

In December 2019, Reuters reported that according to experts, "Venezuela faces a generation of young people who will never meet their full physical or mental potential", compounding the damage towards Venezuela's development as a result of shortages.

==== "The Maduro Diet" ====
The Maduro diet gets you hard without Viagra.

— President Nicolás Maduro

In public, President Maduro often avoids or rebukes issues brought to him by Venezuelans regarding their diets. Many Venezuelans criticized his response to the nation's hunger on state television. During one state address in early 2017, President Maduro joked about how one member of his staff had begun looking skinny, with the member saying "I've lost about 44 pounds since December" due to the "Maduro diet".

While suffering from lack of food due to the shortages under President Nicolás Maduro, Venezuelans called their weight loss from malnourishment and hunger the "Maduro Diet". The "diet" was described as "a collective and forced diet."

=== Medicine and medical supplies ===
Medical shortages in the country hamper medical treatment. Venezuela's over-reliance on imported medical products and professionals contributed to shortages in healthcare, as well as the brain drain due to the crisis in Venezuela. It was also reported that government health officials engaged in corrupt practices like privately selling national medical supplies for personal gain.

Shortages of antiretroviral medicines to treat HIV/AIDS affected about 50,000 Venezuelans, potentially causing thousands of them with HIV to develop AIDS. Venezuelans also said it was hard to find acetaminophen to help alleviate the newly introduced chikungunya virus, a potentially lethal mosquito-borne disease. Diphtheria, which had been eradicated from Venezuela in the 1990s, reappeared in 2016 due to shortages of basic drugs and vaccines. Shortages of various contraceptives, as well as the fact that abortion is illegal, caused sickness in many women, from both backalley abortions and illness caused by pregnancy in vulnerable women. In March 2019, it was reported that the "collapse" of the health system had caused the return of old and eradicated rare diseases like yellow fever, dengue, malaria, and tuberculosis, as well as a large increase in infant and maternal mortality rates. There was also concern that untreated migrants would begin to spread diseases to other countries.

In 2014, the government could not supply enough money for medical supplies among healthcare providers, with doctors saying that 9 of 10 large hospitals had only 7% of required supplies and private doctors reporting numbers of patients that are "impossible" to count dying from easily treated illnesses due to the "downward sliding economy", and doctors at University of Caracas Medical Hospital stopped performing surgeries due to the lack of supplies, even though nearly 3,000 people required surgery. In 2015, only 35% of hospital beds were available and 50% of operating rooms could not function due to the lack of resources and it was reported by the Venezuelan NGO Red de Medicos por la Salud that there was a 68% shortage of surgical supplies and a 70% shortage of medicines in Venezuelan pharmacies. In that year, the Human Rights Watch said that they "have rarely seen access to essential medicines deteriorate as quickly as it has in Venezuela except in war zones".

=== Protests ===
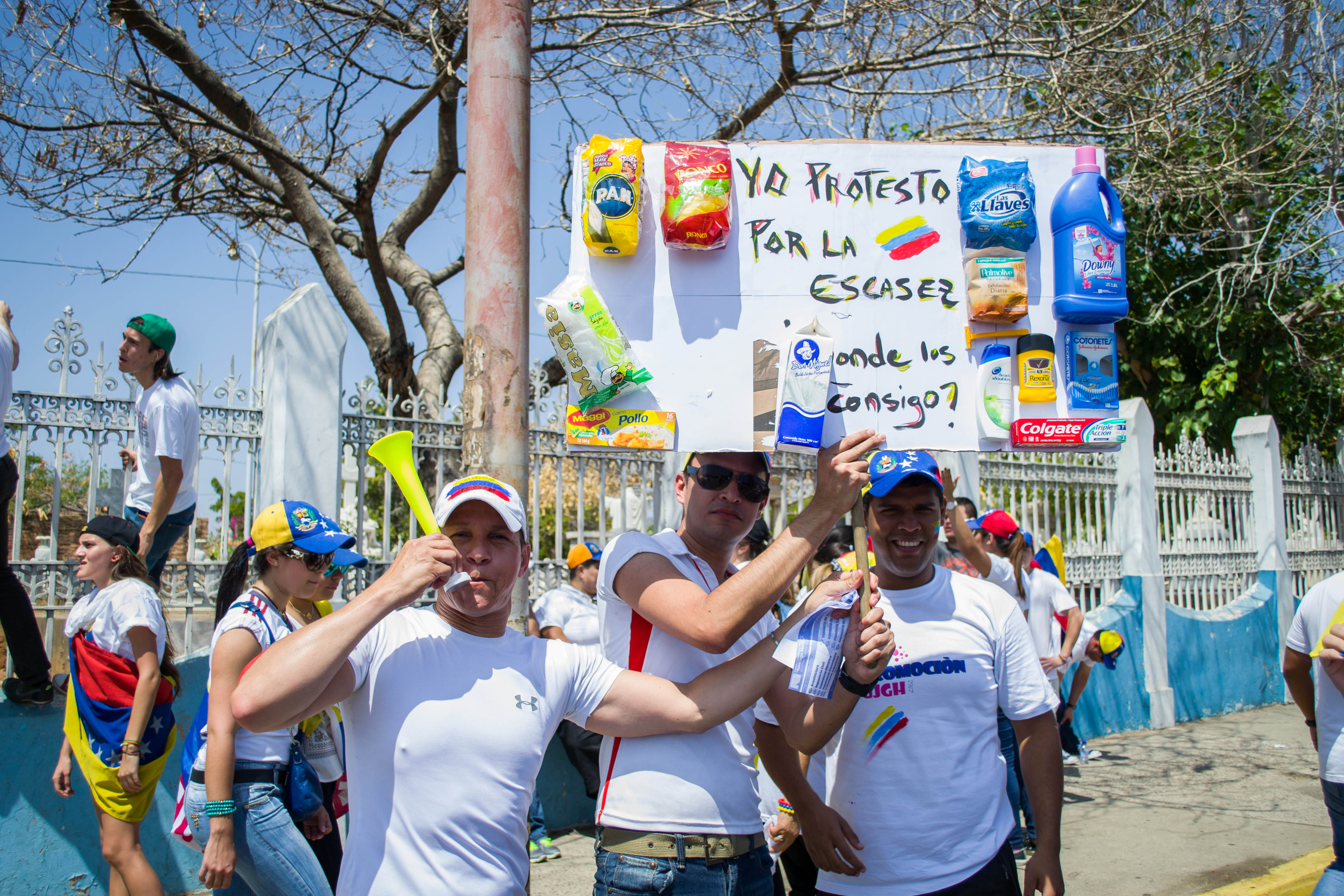
A protester during the 2014 Venezuelan protests holding a sign saying, "Yo protesto por la escasez. Donde los consigo?" (I protest for the scarcity. Where can I get these?).

Demonstrations against the effects of shortages occurred throughout Venezuela. In August 2014, many Venezuelans protested against the fingerprint rationing put in place by the government while protests against shortages grew from late-2014 into 2015. Of the 2,836 protests that occurred in the first half of 2015, a little more than one in six events were demonstrations against shortages. In 2016 after shortages of water began to occur, there were growing incidents of protest as a result.

==== Looting ====
In 2015, growing frustration with shortages and having to wait for hours in long lines for products, led to looting throughout Venezuela. According to the Venezuelan Observatory of Social Conflict, hundreds of events involving looting and attempted looting occurred throughout the country in the first half of the year. It was also noted that looting was not new to the country, but had been increasing throughout 2015. Looters showed signs of "desperation and discomfort" and resorted to looting because they were "frustrated" by the inability to find basic goods.

In July 2015, BBC News said that due to the common shortages in Venezuela, every week there were videos being shared online showing Venezuelans looting supermarkets and trucks for food. In Ciudad, Guyana at the end of July, looting occurred in the city that resulted in one death and the arrest of dozens.

=== Psychological ===
Overall, at the precise moment when you stop finding a product, it becomes more precious than it used to be... Think of it as a work of art that was stolen and when it is found the price is three times higher.

— Eldar Shafir

In 2015, concerns about shortages and inflation overtook violent crime as Venezuelans' main worry for the first time in years according to pollster Datanalisis. According to the chief executive of Datanalisis, Luis Vicente Leon, since insecurity had plagued Venezuela for years, Venezuelans had become accustomed to crime and gave up hope for a solution to it. Vicente Leon said that Venezuelans had greater concerns over shortages and became preoccupied with the difficulties surrounding them instead. Eldar Shafir, author and American behavioral scientist, said that the psychological "obsession" with finding scarce goods in Venezuela is because the rarity of the item makes it "precious".

Despite the threat of violent protests occurring throughout Venezuela, children were more affected psychologically by the economic crisis than violence. Abel Saraiba, a psychologist with children's rights organization Cecodap said in 2017, "We have children from a very early age who are having to think about how to survive", with half of her young clients requiring treatment because of the crisis. Children are often forced to stand in food lines or beg with their parents, while the games they play with other children revolve around finding food. In more extreme cases, Friends of the Child Foundation Amerita Protección (Fundana) psychologist Ninoska Zambrano explains that children are offering sexual services to obtain food. Zambrano said "Families are doing things that not only lead them to break physically, but in general, socially, we are being morally broken".

=== Society ===
Due to the shortages and the associated hunger, many women began to be sterilized to avoid childbirth since they could not provide enough food for their families. Young men joined gangs to fight for food, often showing signs of injury following violent confrontations for morsels of meals. Families gathered at dumpsters in the evening to obtain goods. Children would attempt to take on jobs themselves to earn money for food or even run away so they could try to find sustenance on their own.

== Statistics ==
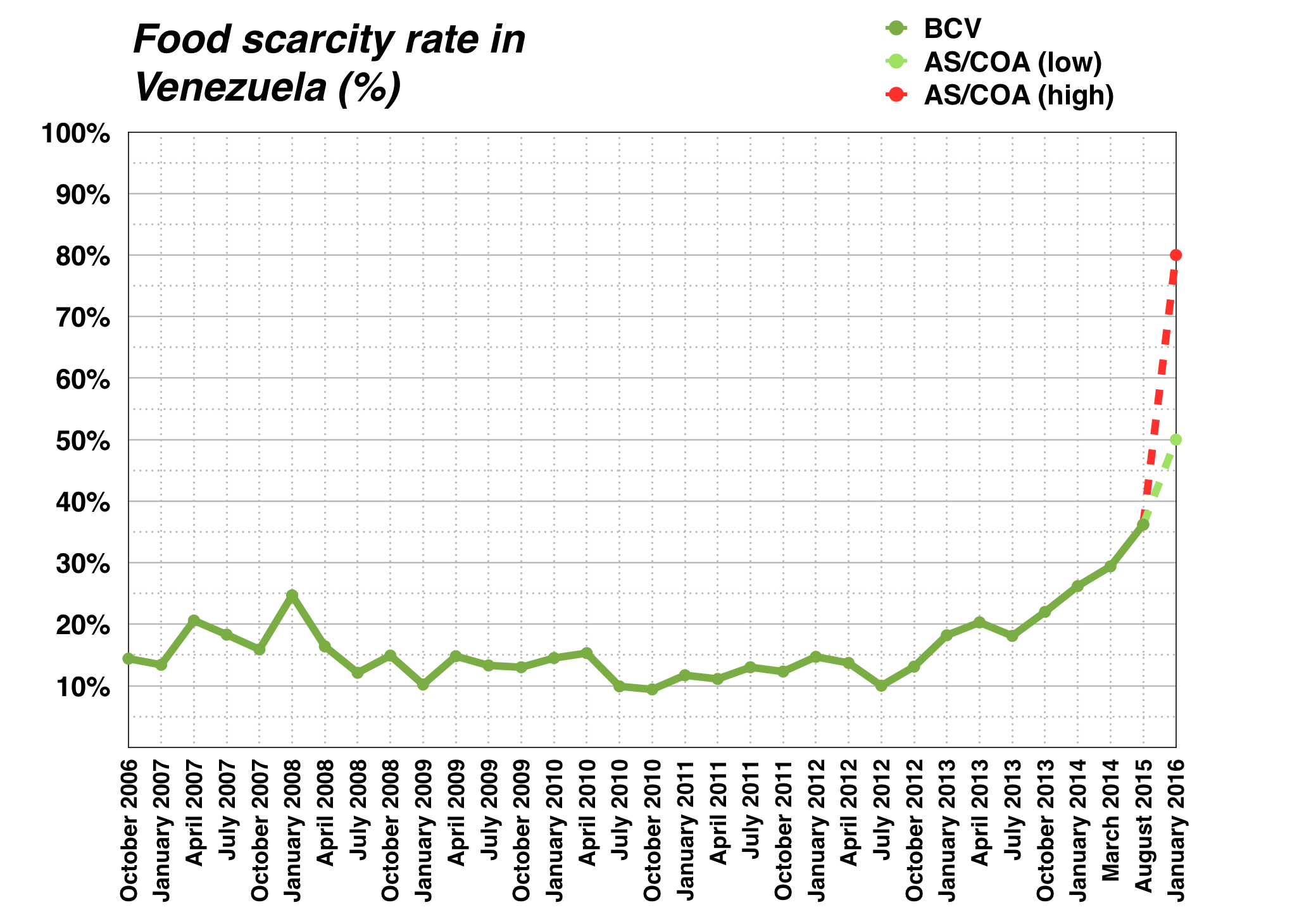
Graph showing the food scarcity rate in Venezuela Sources: Central Bank of Venezuela, AS/COA

There was an 80–90% shortage rate of milk (powdered and liquid), margarine, butter, sugar, beef, chicken, pasta, cheese, corn flour, wheat flour, oil, rice, coffee, toilet paper, diapers, laundry detergent, bar soap, bleach, dish, shampoo and soap in February 2015.

In March 2016, it was estimated that 87% of Venezuelans were consuming less due to the shortages. There was a 50% to 80% rate of food shortages, and 80% of medicines were in short supply or unavailable. By December 2016, 78% of Venezuelans had lost weight due to lack of food.

By February 2017, the Venezuela's Living Conditions Survey, managed by a multi-university organization in Venezuela, reported that about 75% of Venezuelans had lost weight in 2016. The survey had also stated that 83% of Venezuelans were living in poverty, 93% could no longer afford food and that one million Venezuelan school children did not attend classes "due to hunger and a lack of public services".

In the first three months of 2019, the electrical industry suffered major decreases. The national power grid had the capacity to produce 34,000 megawatts, but was averaging between 5,500 and 6,000; this was both one cause of, and a result of, blackouts affecting at least 70% of the country. According to The Washington Post, analysts said that two-thirds of Venezuela's population (20 million people) were without water, partially or completely, in the weeks after the blackouts.

== International aid ==
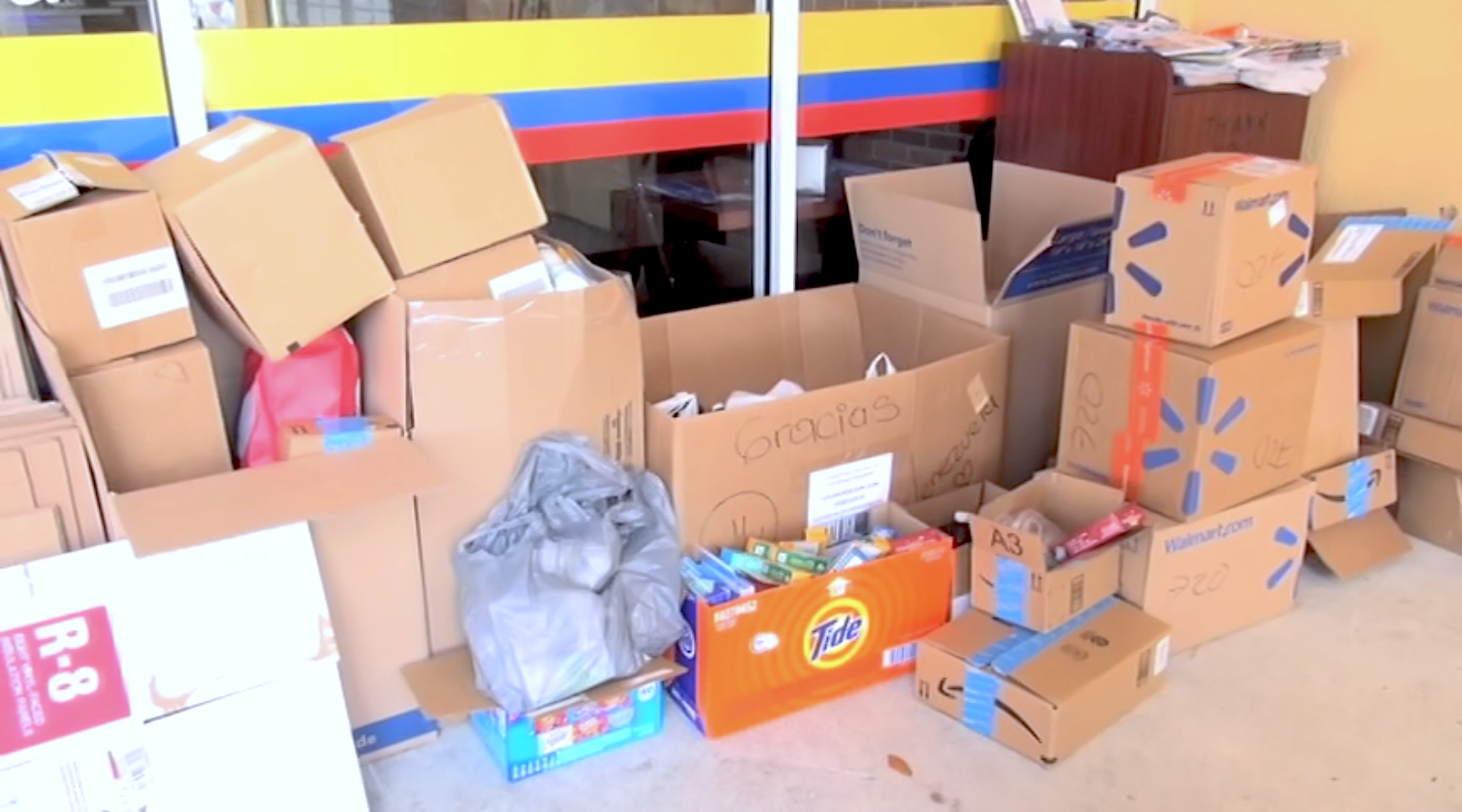
Donations from the Venezuelan community in the United States

Amnesty International, the United Nations and other groups offered aid to Venezuela. The Venezuelan government declined such assistance, however, with Delcy Rodriguez denying in a September 2017 that Venezuela faced a humanitarian crisis.

Venezuelans in other countries organized benefits for those living in Venezuela, collecting products and shipping them to those they trust there. Experts said that due to the extreme state of shortages, it was necessary for many international family members to send essentials to their families.

== See also ==
- Fuel shortages in Venezuela
- 2019 Venezuelan blackouts
- Economy of Venezuela
- Healthcare in Venezuela
- Hyperinflation in Venezuela
- Venezuelan banking crisis of 2009–10
- 2010 Colombia–Venezuela diplomatic crisis
- Crisis in Venezuela during the Bolivarian Revolution (2010–present)
- 2013–present economic crisis in Venezuela
- 2015 Venezuela–Colombia migrant crisis
- Energy crisis in Venezuela
- Venezuelan presidential crisis
