= Health in Venezuela =

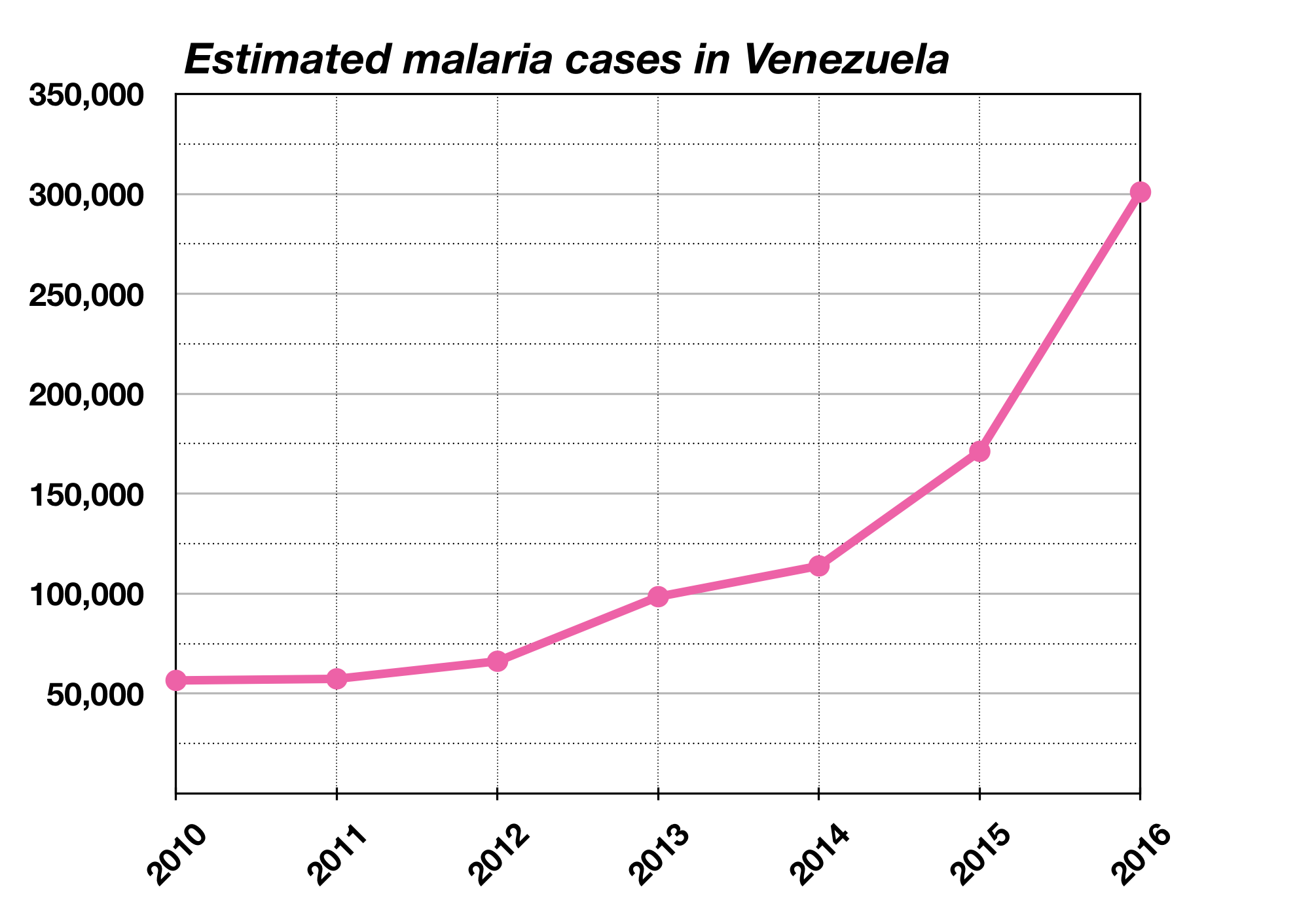
Estimated malaria case in Venezuela

Life expectancy in Venezuela

The recent state of health in Venezuela has seen that from 1992 to 1993, there was a cholera epidemic in the Orinoco Delta and Venezuela's political leaders were accused of racial profiling of their own indigenous people to deflect blame from the country's institutions, thereby aggravating the epidemic. During the 1990s, the mortality rate was 318 per 100,000 people for heart and heart-related diseases, 156 for cancers, 634 for external causes (including drowning, self-harm, violence, falls, road accidents etc.), 1,126 for communicable diseases such as chest infections, syphilis, and meningitis, and 654 for certain congenital conditions.

Several transmissible diseases, including dengue fever, malaria, measles, and tuberculosis, reappeared in Venezuela. In 1999 an estimated 62,000 Venezuelans were living with acquired immune deficiency syndrome (AIDS), and in 2001 an estimated 2,000 people died from AIDS. At the end of 2003, the percentage of the population between the ages of 15 and 49 with human immunodeficiency virus (HIV)/AIDS was 0.7. In 2000, 85% of the urban population and 70% of the rural population had access to potable water. Sanitation levels improved for 71% of the urban population and 48% of the rural population. In August 2001, President Hugo Chávez announced a national campaign to fight the dengue fever epidemic that had infected 24,000 and killed four. Child immunization for measles in 2002 (as a percentage of those under 12 months of age) dropped to 78%, compared with 84% in 1999.

In August 2014, Venezuela was the only country in Latin America where the incidence of malaria was increasing, allegedly due to illegal mining; and in 2013, Venezuela registered the highest number of cases of malaria in the past 50 years, with 300 out of every 100,000 Venezuelans being infected with the disease. Medical shortages in the country also hampered the treatment of Venezuelans. Shortages of antiretroviral medicines to treat HIV/AIDS affected about 50,000 Venezuelans, potentially causing thousands of Venezuelans with HIV to develop AIDS. Venezuelans also stated that due to shortages of medicines, it was hard to find acetaminophen to help alleviate the newly introduced chikungunya virus, a potentially lethal mosquito-borne disease. In September 2014, Health Minister Nancy Pérez admitted that there were 45,745 cases of dengue fever. There were also contested estimates involving the number of Venezuelans infected with chikungunya. In September 2014, the Venezuelan government stated that only 400 Venezuelans were infected with chikungunya while the Central University of Venezuela stated that there could be between 65,000 and 117,000 Venezuelans infected. In August 2015, independent health monitors said that there were more than two million people infected with chikungunya while the government said there were 36,000 cases.

In October 2014, President Maduro announced a plan to create the University of Science and Health and called for a meeting of ALBA to discuss measures against the Ebola virus disease during the Ebola virus epidemic in West Africa.

In 2016, according to the Venezuelan government, 240,000 cases of malaria were reported, rising 76% in one year. Former Venezuelan health minister José Félix Oletta estimated that more than 500,000 Venezuelans would contract malaria in 2017. 324 suspected diphtheria cases were reported in 2016, the first since 1992, and increasing numbers in following years, with 287 deaths up to the end of 2018. There are reports of diphtheria spreading to other South American countries from Venezuela.

In April 2017 Venezuela's health ministry reported that maternal mortality had jumped by 65% in 2016 and that the number of infant deaths rose by 30%. It also said that the number of cases of malaria was up by 76%. The ministry had not reported health data in two years, and none has been reported since. In May, Maduro sacked the health minister, Antonieta Caporale, for publishing the damning statistics.

In November 2017 the Venezuelan Society of Public Health reported that a total of 857 cases of measles, of which 465 had been confirmed, had been registered. The Pan American Health Organization reported that at least 71% of the reported cases of measles in 2017 occurred in Venezuela.

== See also ==
- Health care in Venezuela
