= List of Venice Biennale of Architecture exhibitions =

This is a list of Venice Biennale of Architecture exhibitions.

== Editions ==
#	Year	Director/Curator	Exhibition	Awards	Ref
1st	1980	Paolo Portoghesi	The Presence of the Past		
2nd	1981-82	Paolo Portoghesi			
3rd	1985	Aldo Rossi	Progetto Venezia		
4th	1986	Aldo Rossi	Hendrik Petrus Berlage—Drawings		
5th	1991	Francesco Dal Co			
6th	1996	Hans Hollein	Sensing the Future—The Architect as Seismograph	Special Prize for Best National Participation: Japan; Golden Lion for Best Interpretation of the International Exhibition: Odile Decq, Benoît Cornette, Juha Kaakko, Ilkka Laine, Kimmo Liimatainen, Jari Tirkkonen, Enric Miralles; Special Osella for an Extraordinary Initiative in Contemporary Architecture: Pasqual Maragall; Special Osella for Media Exposure in the Field of Contemporary Architecture: Wim Wenders; Special Osella for Best Architecture Photographer: Gabriele Basilico	
7th	2000	Massimiliano Fuksas	Less Aesthetics, More Ethics	Golden Lion for Lifetime Achievement: Renzo Piano, Paolo Soleri, and Jørn Utzon.; Golden Lion for Best Interpretation of the International Exhibition: Jean Nouvel; Special Prize for Best National Participation: Spain; Special "Bruno Zevi" prize for best architecture professor: Joseph Rykwert; Special Prize for Best Architectural Works Patron: Thomas Krens; Special Prize for Best Architecture Editor: Eduardo Luis Rodriguez; Special Prize for Best Architecture Photographer: Ilya Utkin	
8th	2002	Deyan Sudjic	NEXT	Golden Lion for Lifetime Achievement: Toyo Ito; Golden Lion for Best Participation in the International Exhibition: Iberê Camargo Foundation designed by Alvaro Siza Vieira; Special Mention for Best Participation in the International Exhibition: Mexico City for The Lakes Project; Special Prize for Best National Participation: Netherlands; Special Prize for Best Architectural Works Patron: Zhang Xin; Special Prize for Best government Sponsorship: Barcelona	
9th	2004	Kurt W. Forster	METAMORPH	Golden Lion for Lifetime Achievement: Peter Eisenman; Golden Lion for Best National Participation: Belgium with Kinshasa, the Imaginary City; Golden Lion for Best Participation in the International Exhibition: Studio SANAA (Kazuyo Sejima + Ryue Nishizawa)	
10th	2006	Ricky Burdett	Cities, architecture and society	Golden Lion for Lifetime Achievement: Richard Rogers; Golden Lion for Best National Participation: Denmark with CO-EVOLUTION, curated by Henrik Valeur and UiD; Golden Lion for the City: Bogotá, Colombia; Golden Lion for Best Urban Projects: Higuera + Sanchez for the Brazil 44 project in Mexico City	
11th	2008	Aaron Betsky	Out There: Architecture Beyond Building	Golden Lion for Lifetime Achievement: Frank Gehry; Special Golden Lion for Lifetime Achievement to a Historian of Architecture: James S. Ackerman; Golden Lion for Best National Participation: Poland with Hotel Polonia. The Afterlife of Buildings, curated by Nicolas Grospierre and Kobas Laksa; Golden Lion for Best Participation in the International Exhibition: Greg Lynn Form for Recycled Toys Furniture; Silver Lion for a Promising Young Architect in the International Exhibition: Elemental	
12th	2010	Kazuyo Sejima	People Meet in Architecture	Golden Lion for Lifetime Achievement: Rem Koolhaas; Golden Lion for Best National Participation: Kingdom of Bahrain; Golden Lion for Best Participation in the International Exhibition: junya.ishigami+associates; Golden Lion in Memoriam: Kazuo Shinohara; Silver Lion for a Promising Young Architect in the International Exhibition: OFFICE Kersten Geers David Van Severen + Bas Princen; Special Mentions: Amateur Architecture Studio, Studio Mumbai, Piet Oudolf	
13th	2012	David Chipperfield	Common Ground	Golden Lion for Lifetime Achievement: Alvaro Siza; Golden Lion for Best National Participation: Japan with Architecture, possible here? Home-for-All, curated by Toyo Ito, Kumiko Inui, Sou Fujimoto, Akihisa Hirata, and Naoya Hatakeyama.; Golden Lion for Best Interpretation of the International Exhibition: Urban-Think Tank (Alfredo Brillembourg, Hubert Klumpner), Justin McGuirk, and Iwan Baan; Silver Lion for a Promising Young Architect in the International Exhibition: Grafton Architects (Yvonne Farrell and Shelley McNamara); Special Mentions: Poland, commissioner Hanna Wróblewska; United States of America, commissioner Cathy Lang Ho; Russia, commissioner Grigory Revzin; Cino Zucchi.	
14th	2014	Rem Koolhaas	Fundamentals	Golden Lion for Lifetime Achievement: Phyllis Lambert; Golden Lion for Best National Participation: South Korea with Crow's Eye View, curated by Minsuk Cho, Hyungmin Pai, and Changmo Ahn.; Silver Lion for Best National Participation: Chile with Monolith Controversies, curated by Pedro Alonso and Hugo Palmarola.; Silver Lion for Best Research Project of the Monditalia section: Andrés Jaque for Sales Oddity; Special Mentions to National Participations: Canada, France, Russia; Special Mentions to Research Projects of the Monditalia section: Radical Pedagogies by Beatriz Colomina, Britt Eversole, Ignacio Galán, Evangelos Kotsioris, Anna-Maria Meister, Federica Vannucchi, Amunátegui Valdés Architects, Smog.tv; Intermundia by Ana Dana Beroš; Italian Limes by Folder	
15th	2016	Alejandro Aravena	Reporting from the Front	Golden Lion for Lifetime Achievement: Paulo Mendes da Rocha.; Golden Lion for Best National Participation: Spain with Unfinished, curated by Iñaqui Carnicero and Carlos Quintáns.; Golden Lion for Best Participation in the International Exhibition: Breaking The Siege, curated by Gabinete de Arquitectura (Solano Benitez and Gloria Cabral)	
16th	2018	Yvonne Farrell and Shelley McNamara	FREESPACE	Golden Lion for Lifetime Achievement: Kenneth Frampton; Golden Lion for Best National Participation: Switzerland, with Svizzera 240, House Tour, curated by Alessandro Bosshard, Li Tavor, Matthew van der Ploeg, Ani Vihervaara.; Special Mention for Best National Participation: Great Britain, with Island by Caruso St John Architects and Marcus Taylor; Golden Lion for Best Participation in the International Exhibition: Souto Moura Arquitectos + Eduardo Souto de Moura (Portugal).; Silver Lion for a Promising Young Architect in the International Exhibition: architecten de Vylder Vinck Taillie; Special Mentions: Andra Matin and Rahul Mehrotra	
17th	2021	Hashim Sarkis	How Will We Live Together?	Special Golden Lion for Lifetime Achievement: Lina Bo Bardi; Golden Lion for Best National Participation: United Arab Emirates, with Wetland.; Special mention as National Participation: Russia, with Open!; Special mention as National Participation: Philippines, with Structures of Mutual Support.; Golden Lion for Best Participation in the International Exhibition: raumlaborberlin with Instances of Urban Practice. (Germany); Silver Lion for a Promising Young Architect in the International Exhibition Foundation for Achieving Seamless Territory with Border Ecologies and the Gaza Strip (Netherlands); Special Mention for Participation in the International Exhibition: cave_bureau with The Anthropocene Museum: Exhibit 3.0 Obsidian Rain (Kenya)	
18th	2023	Lesley Lokko	The Laboratory of the Future	Golden Lion for Lifetime Achievement: Demas Nwoko; Golden Lion for Best National Participation: Brazil with Terra, curated by Gabriela de Matos and Paulo Tavares; Golden Lion for Best Participation in the International Exhibition: DAAR – Alessandro Petti and Sandi Hilal.	
19th	2025	Carlo Ratti	Intelligens. Natural. Artificial. Collective	Golden Lion for Lifetime Achievement: Donna Haraway; Special Golden Lion for Lifetime Achievement in Memoriam: Italo Rota; Golden Lion for Best National Participation: Bahrain with Heatwave, curated by Andrea Faraguna; Special Mention for Best National Participation: Holy See with Opera Aperta, curated by Marina Otero Verzier, Giovanna Zabotti, Tatiana Bilbao, MAIO Architects; Special Mention for Best National Participation: Great Britain with GBR: Geology of Britannic Repair, curated by Owen Hopkins, Kathryn Yusoff, Kabage Karanja, Stella Muteg; Golden Lion for Best Participation in the International Exhibition: Diller Scofidio + Renfro, Natural Systems Utilities, SODAI, Aaron Betsky, and Davide Oldani with Canal Café.; Special Mention for Participation in the International Exhibition: Tosin Oshinowo with Alternative Urbanism: The Central Organized Markets of Lagos; Special Mention for Participation in the International Exhibition: Boonserm Premthada with Elephant Chapel.	
20th	2027	Wang Shu and Lu Wenyu	TBD		

== See also ==
- Venice Biennale of Architecture
- List of winners of the Golden Lion for Best National Participation at the Venice Biennale of Architecture
- List of winners of the Golden Lion for Best Participation in the International Exhibition at the Venice Biennale of Architecture
