= Squatting in Venezuela =

Occupation of unused land or derelict buildings without permission of owner

Venezuela on globe

Squatting in Venezuela is the occupation of derelict buildings or unused land without the permission of the owner. Informal settlements, known first as "ranchos" and then "barrios", are common. In the capital Caracas notable squats have included the 23 de Enero housing estate, Centro Financiero Confinanzas (a derelict skyscraper) and El Helicoide, a former shopping centre which is now a notorious prison.

== History ==
Following the 1948 Venezuelan coup d'état, the military junta followed a process of shanty town eradication and forcible resettlement. The informal settlements were known as ranchos, and shacks were built out of recycled materials such as cinder blocks, metal, cardboard and cement.

== 23 de Enero superblocks ==
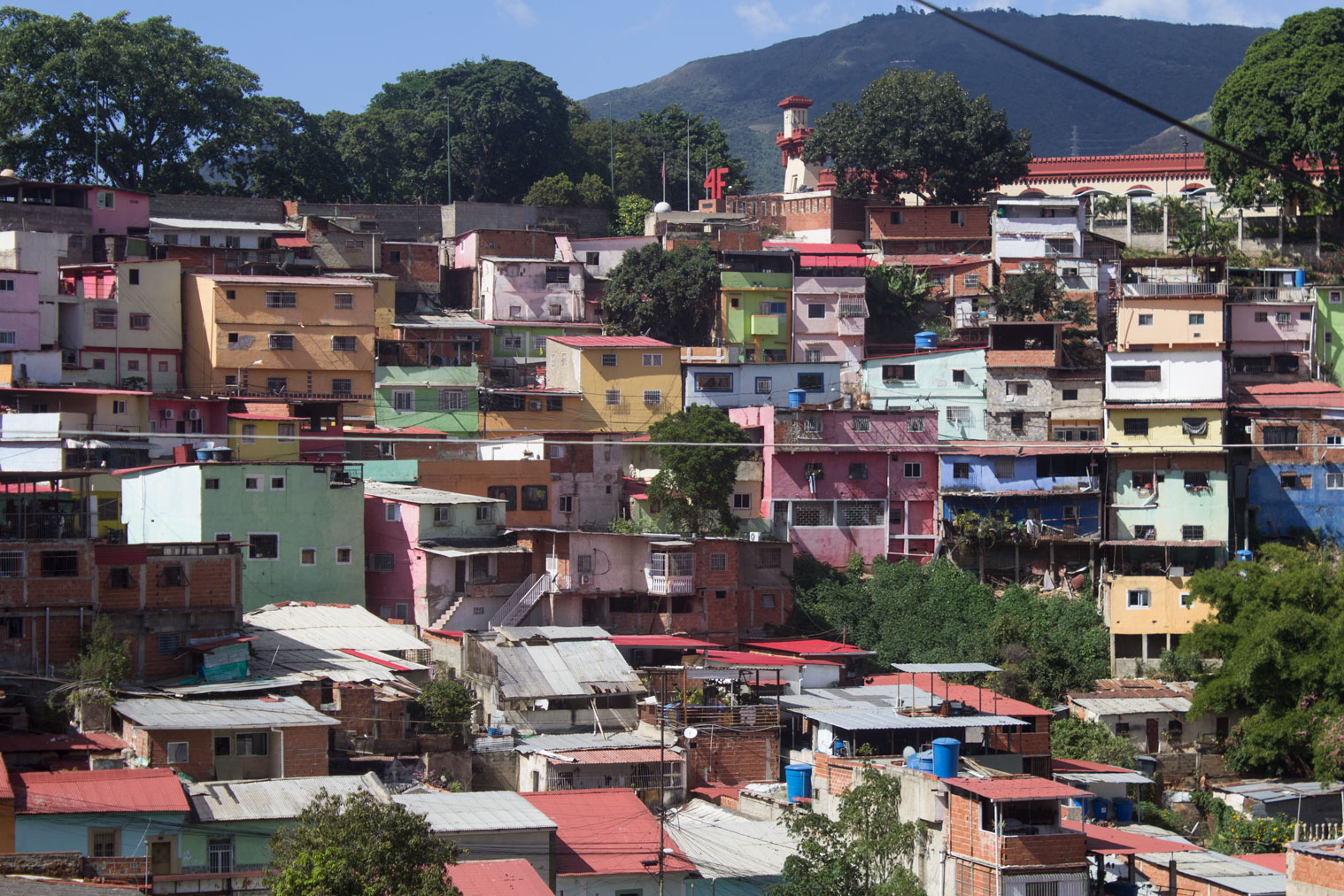
Informal housing in 23 de Enero, 2019

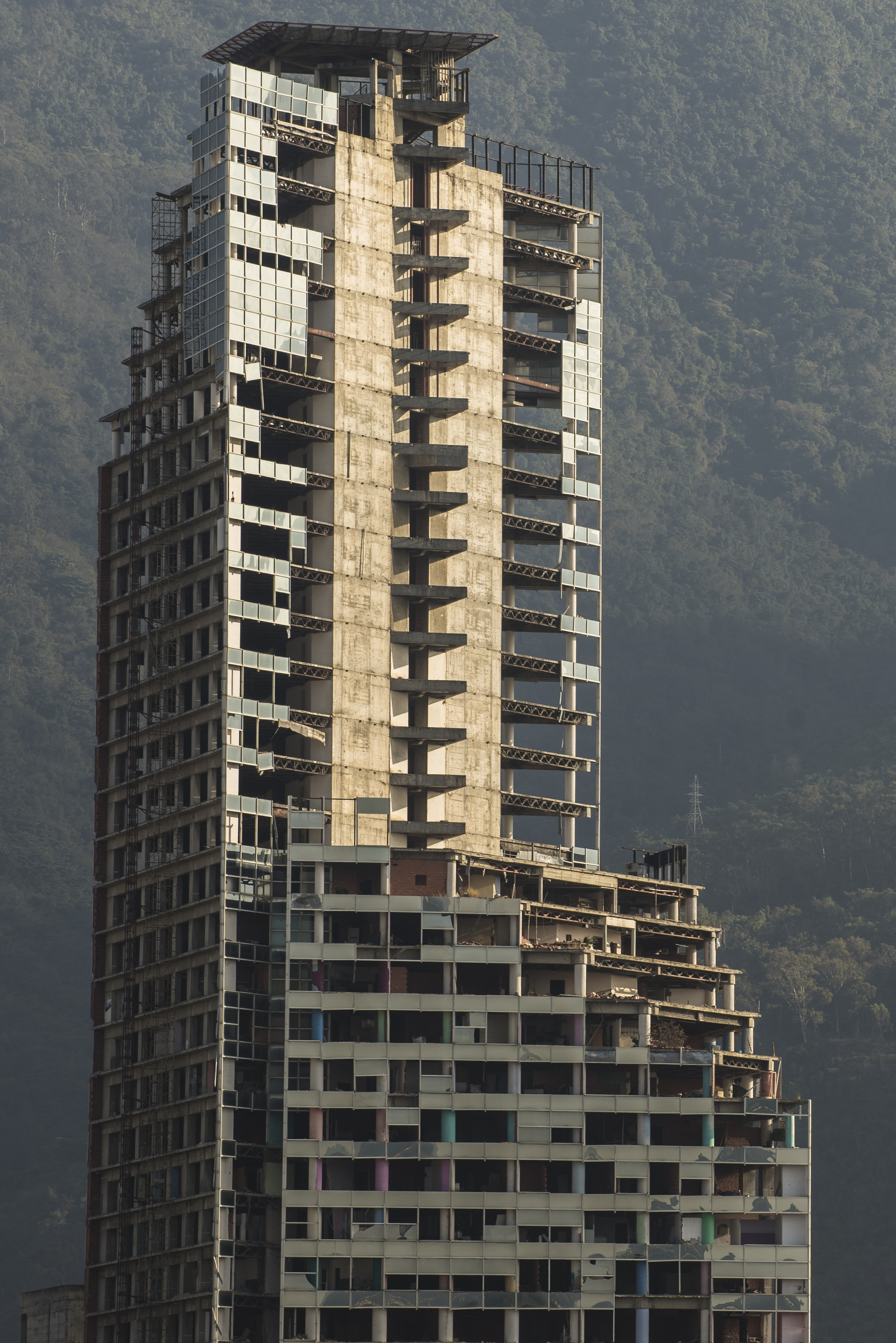
The Centro Financiero Confinanzas in 2017

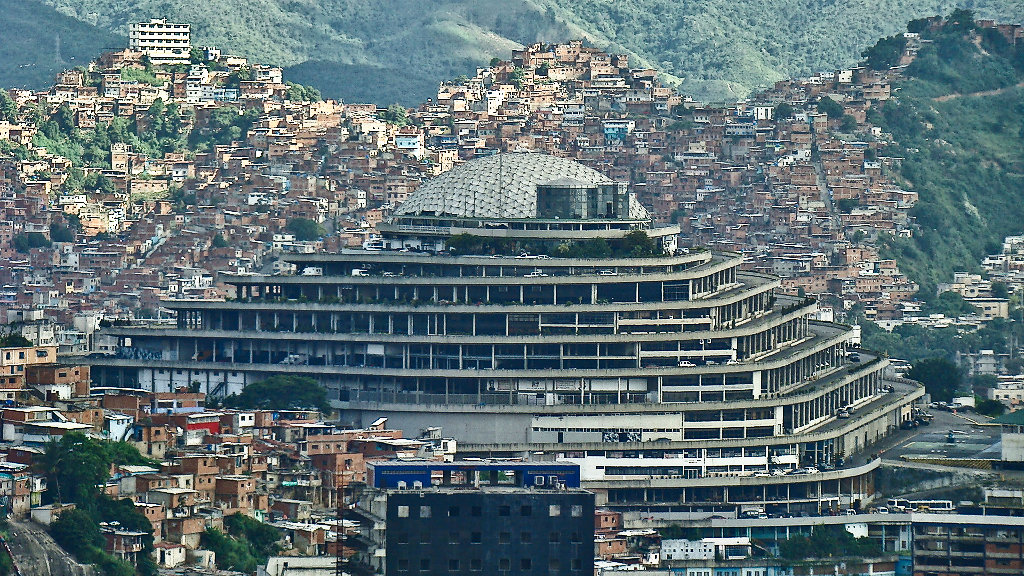
El Helicoide in 2008

Following the 1958 Venezuelan coup d'état, thousands of people occupied empty apartments in the superblocks of the 2 de Diciembre (2 December) housing estate, which had been built in tribute to the then President of Venezuela, Marcos Pérez Jiménez. After he had been deposed, the new residents renamed the 37 blocks to 23 de Enero (23 January), marking the date of the coup.

At the time of the coup, there were 47,000 people living in the blocks and some had been forcibly resettled there. The population then exploded to 72,000 overnight. The authorities struggled to regularize the new residents and to collect rent, which in some cases the squatters were reluctant to pay since the apartments were unfinished and there were problems with the water supply. As well as the new occupiers of the buildings, between 20,000 and 25,000 people created new ranchos in the area of 23 de Enero. Some renters then decided it was more cost-effective to live in a shack and left their apartments. Squatters who had occupied the local schools were also relocated. Whilst the state tolerated the block squatters, it decided to evict the ranchos, in a policy reminiscent of the previous dictatorship. The artist Feliciano Carvallo was given two days notice to move and then his rancho was burnt down and he lost 20 paintings. By 1959, there were still 15,000 ranchos at 23 de Enero.

== Recent ==
In 1989, the Caracazo resulted in the deaths of many inhabitants of informal settlements, now commonly known as "barrios". In consequence, the Asamblea de Barrios was formed to campaign for the rights of shanty town dwellers. This then joined the Bolivaran movement which resulted in Hugo Chávez becoming the president in December 1998. At this time, nine of ten Venezuelans lived in urban areas and over half were squatters. Chávez introduced a program in 2002 which was run by the National Technical Office for the Regularization of Urban Land Tenancy and aimed to give rancho dwellers title to their land. The state planned to build 3 million houses by 2019, under Mission Habitat and Great Mission Housing Venezuela.

The Centro Financiero Confinanzas is an unfinished skyscraper that became a notorious symbol of the Venezuelan banking crisis of 1994. After years of dereliction, it was squatted in 2007 by evangelical Christians as part of a wave of occupations in Caracas. Around 3,000 people lived there before being resettled in 2014. An earlier squatted building in Caracas was El Helicoide, which is located in the barrio of San Agustín del Sur. Intended to be a shopping centre it was never completed then occupied by 10,000 people between 1979 and 1982, some of whom had been previously displaced by its construction. The Bolivarian Intelligence Service took over the building in 1985 and it has become a notorious prison, where people participating in the ongoing protests have been taken to be tortured. In the 2020 World Justice Project Rule of Law Index, Venezuela was rated 128th out 128 countries.
