= Brillembourg =

Brillembourg is a surname. Notable people with the surname include:

- Carlos Brillembourg (fl. 1975), American architect
- David Brillembourg (1942–1993), Venezuelan tycoon
- Hilda Ochoa-Brillembourg (born 1945), Venezuelan businesswoman
