= Great Mission Housing Venezuela =

Bolivarian mission

Great Mission Housing Venezuela (GMVV)
- Gran Misión Vivienda Venezuela
- Type of project: Bolivarian mission
- Country: Venezuela
- Ministry: Housing and Habitat Ministry
- Key people: Hugo Chávez, Nicolás Maduro, Alex Saab
- Launched: 2011; 15 years ago
- Status: Active
- Website: www.minhvi.gob.ve

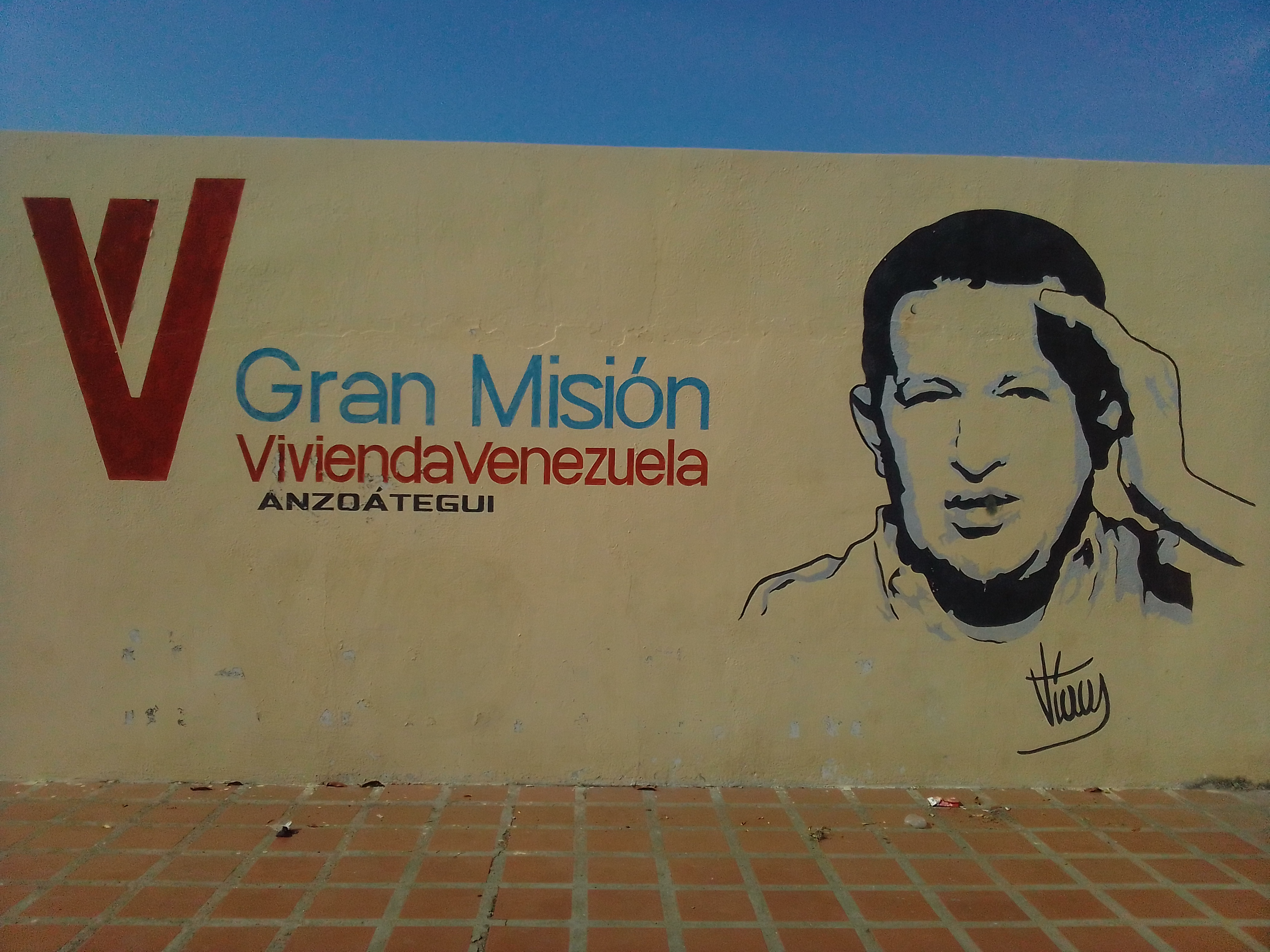
Mural Gran Misión Vivienda Venezuela

Great Mission Housing Venezuela (Spanish: Gran Misión Vivienda Venezuela, GMVV) is a program of the Venezuelan government Bolivarian missions to provide housing for people who live in precarious conditions. The program was launched by the Hugo Chávez administration in 2011 and planned to build 350,000 houses by the end of 2012. Between 2011 and 2017 the Venezuelan government built 1.3 million new homes as part the GMVV programme and in July 2023, Nicolás Maduro announced that the program had delivered 4.6 million houses.

The program has been subject to criticism due to corruption, opacity and structural deficiencies. Between 2012 and 2013, Colombian businessman Alex Saab received US$159 million from the Venezuelan government to import housing materials, but only products worth US$3 million were delivered. By 2017, there were inconsistencies in government figures about investment and there was a deficit of at least $76 billion whose destination was unknown. The same year, during the Constituent Assembly election, government officials pressured residents to participate in the process. Engineers have warned about infrastructure deterioration of program's buildings, and that houses are vulnerable in the event of an earthquake.

== Program ==
President Hugo Chávez started the social missions in 2003 with the purpose of helping the most disadvantaged social sectors and guaranteeing essential rights such as health, education and food. The program aimed investing economic revenue from the state-owned Petróleos de Venezuela (PDVSA). Transparencia Venezuela, Transparency International's chapter in the country, described that the model allowed political support to the government at the time, but that "as the years went by, many social missions lost their social perspective" and focused on political activities characterized by discretionality and opacity.

According to the government, under the program, the government provides residents with a long-term payment plan based on their means, calculating the payments on the building cost of the houses and not the market value of the property, that each resident retains their house for life and can pass the house on to their children. If a resident wishes to sell their house within thirty years of taking possession, the government has first refusal. Residents do not have full ownership rights over their homes.

Countries with building contracts have included Russia, China and Belarus.

A panel organized by Transparencia Venezuela in 2016, made up of experts, human rights activists and deputies, determined that the program had little success in reducing poverty during twelve years of its implementation. The panel also concluded that the mission was used for political and electoral purposes, mainly among the most vulnerable social sectors.

== History ==
In 2014, the squatters of the Centro Financiero Confinanzas were resettled under the program in Cúa, to the south of Caracas. According to the Venezuelan Chamber of Construction, a total of 545,612 homes were built during the 12 years of Chávez's administration, between 1999 and 2010: 284,852 by the public sector and 260,760 by the private sector. According to the Venezuelan government figures, a million Venezuelans were rehoused under the GMVV by March 2016. Similar figures have been disputed by Venezuelan fact checkers. In 2015, a woman hit President Nicolás Maduro on the head with a mango that had a message attached asking Maduro to help her find housing. The woman was granted a flat under the scheme afterwards.

By 2016, opposition deputy Julio Borges said he had received complaints of the eviction of residents that were opposed to the government. The same year he proposed a bill that would give residents their properties title deeds with no extra costs and allow them to sell their homes once they received their deeds. The bill passed its first reading in the National Assembly made up of an opposition majority. Some residents were concerned that the opposition's bill would cause an increase in their housing debt. On 2 September 2016, residents of the Villa Rosa neighborhood in Porlamar, Margarita Island, Nueva Esparta state, received Maduro with jeers and a cacerolazo, banging pots and pans, while he was inaugurating houses of the Great Mission Housing. At least 30 persons were detained by the Bolivarian Intelligence Service (SEBIN) after the cacerolazo in Villa Rosa.

Between 2011 and 2017 the Venezuelan government built 1.3 million new homes as part the GMVV programme. In 2017, government officials went apartment by apartment in Great Mission Housing buildings to pressure residents to vote in the 2017 Constituent Assembly election, registering them, ordering to vote and telling them that they would be taken to the polling centers.

The Venezuelan government promised to deliver a total of five million houses. In 2018, Efecto Cocuyo's fact checker described the goal as unrealistic as it would require the Venezuelan government to build two houses per minute.

In July 2023, Nicolás Maduro announced that the program had delivered 4.6 million houses.

== Criticism ==
=== Corruption ===
Armando.Info, a Venezuelan investigative journalist outlet, reported that Colombian businessman Alex Saab received US$159 million from the Venezuelan government to import housing materials between 2012 and 2013, but only delivered products worth US$3 million.

On 25 January 2017, Housing Mission state and pro-government workers assembled in front of the headquarters of the Ministry of Housing and Habitat in Barquisimeto to protest the illegal dismissal of their workers and the failure to complete 161 houses in Carora, Torres municipality in Lara state, demanding a response. The president of the Unified Union of the Construction Industry of the state, Pedro Peña, stated that the shell corporation, called Incorsa, left the more than 80 workers without social benefits. The project started in 2013 and was paralyzed in 2014, when the workers demanded the labor benefits they were entitled to by law. The general manager of the project, Juan Gómez, said that there were already suspicions about the integrity of the project, given that construction materials were rarely received, with the sole exception of sand and cement.

In 2017, the president of the Center of Engineers of the state of Zulia (CIDEZ), Marcelo Monnot, denounced inconsistencies between the figures offered by the national government on the investment in the mission's projects, and estimating that there was a $76 billion deficit, whose destination he demanded to be known. The president of the CIDEZ Housing Commission, José Contreras, also pointed out inconsistencies in the figures offered by Governor Francisco Arias Cárdenas.

By 2017, according to a poll by Datanálisis, 93 percent of the population had not benefited from any new housing or government program in the last 17 years.

=== Opacity ===
Official information regarding the housing construction is not public, including quality of the materials used, the total investment, whether the corresponding soil studies were carried out and the number of housing units actually built, making the Housing Mission effectively unauditable.

In September 2016, the NGO Transparencia Venezuela issued a bulletin that reported: "There are many housing developments built without the required feasibility and risk studies for buildings, monitoring of bidding control, criteria for the selection of beneficiaries, among other elements, which increases the levels of corruption within the program, accentuates the opacity of information and the right to housing in adequate conditions."

Enzo Betancourt, president of the Engineers Association of Venezuela, has stated that the Venezuelan Engineers Association does not have official information on the structural calculations of Misión Vivienda, saying: "That is a state secret. Only the people of the mission and the builders know. What is known is what has been denounced by all the media, of buildings with cracks, fissures or leaks".

Alfredo Cilento, researcher and co-founder of the Instituto de Desarrollo Experimental de la Construcción (IDEC) of the Universidad Central de Venezuela (UCV), has declared that independent evaluations by students or the Engineers Association is allowed, saying: "We believe that there is vulnerability in the Misión Vivienda buildings. In some areas it is more or less evident. We know that it is not clear the quality of the soil studies, or if they were done. They also do not allow students to enter, or independent inspections to be made. Nothing can be ascertained or verified because the College of Engineers was never allowed to review the plans or the studies. It is surrounded by a secrecy that prevents professionals from issuing an authoritative opinion". However, Cliento has said that there is evidence of vulnerabilities at plain sight, including the demolition of buildings, even when not inhabited, and that despite that it cannot be concluded that all buildings are vulnerable "we do know that some of them are."

=== Structural deficiencies ===
In 2013, Enzo Betancourt warned about the deterioration of the infrastructure of Misión Vivienda, stating that the Association had constantly called the attention of government authorities. Enzo gave as an example the situation of the Ciudad Caribia housing complex, where by 2012 they had received several complaints of walls that had fallen down, unsupported friezes and cracked walls and slabs. Betancourt said that as a result of the complaints he had warned that all the phases to be taken into account in the construction of the housing should be completed in the short term, that in spite of the haste with which the executive carried out the project, professional and technical factors should be taken into account so that it could be viable and have an optimum quality, and that all the works of the Housing Mission should have a chronogram of activities to execute the works properly.

In 2016, Enzo Betancourt described as false the figures offered by Nicolás Maduro regarding the delivery of new housing, stating that by that date the works had been paralyzed for three months. Enzo stated that the figures included the so-called "Barrio Nuevo Barrio Tricolor", existing shanty houses in slums that were being rebuilt, decorated and falsely presented as new buildings.

On 30 August 2017, cracks in a Misión Vivienda building in Tanaguarenas, Vargas state, grew larger after a 4.5 magnitude earthquake; residents feared that the damage could cause the structures to collapse.

Gustavo Izaguirre, dean of the Faculty of Architecture and Urbanism of the Central University of Venezuela, warned that there have been construction elements that make the buildings vulnerable in the event of an earthquake.

During the 2026 Venezuela earthquakes, three out of the four GMVV apartment buildings in Caraballeda, La Guaira state, were destroyed. The buildings contained at least 960 apartments.

== See also ==
- Great Mission New Neighborhood, Tricolor Neighborhood
