= Boutique Monaco =

Skyscraper in Seoul, South Korea

- Boutique Monaco in 2020
- Interactive map of the Boutique Monaco area

General information
- Location: 397, Seocho-daero, Seocho-gu, Seoul
- Coordinates: 37°29′50.28″N 127°1′28.76″E
- Year built: 2008

Height
- Height: 117 m (384 ft)

Technical details
- Floor count: 27
- Floor area: 54,844.94 m^{2} (590,346.0 ft^{2})

Design and construction
- Architect: Minsuk Cho
- Architecture firm: Mass Studies
- Main contractor: GS E&C

Website
- boutiquemonaco.co.kr

Boutique Monaco (Korean: 부띠크모나코) is a 117-metre, 27-storey residential skyscraper in the ward of Seocho-gu in Seoul. The 172-unit residential tower was developed by Bumwoo Co., Ltd. and designed by Minsuk Cho as the working title of "Missing Matrix". The lower five floors are retail and commercial facilities, and the officetel, a type of studio apartment in Korea, sits on the upper floors.

Boutique Monaco was the recipient of the 2008 Silver Emporis Skyscraper Award, beating the much taller 101-story Shanghai World Financial Center. It was awarded the prize for housing in the Seoul Architecture Award 2009.

== Architecture ==
Boutique Monaco is known for its daring design, which includes several recesses that give the building a unique appearance. The 15 "missing spaces" were intentionally left empty to comply with the floor area ratio limit of the site. If the building had been designed as a simple vertical square, it would have exceeded the ratio limit by 10 percent. It met the restriction by removing the chunks from the building.

In addition to addressing the limitation, the 15 voids provide micro-environments on the high-rise building. Each void contains a "sky garden" that can be overlooked from the resident's balcony. Cho intended to combat the high tower's lack of human interaction by injecting more human qualities.

== In media ==
=== Film ===
- Up to the Sky - Missing Matrix (Boutique Monaco), Seoul. Documentary, Germany, 2012. A film by Sabine Pollmeier and Joachim Haupt, Production: Parnass Film, ZDF, arte, series: Up to the Sky.

=== Television ===
- Boutique Monaco is featured in episode 14 of My Love from the Star.

== Gallery ==
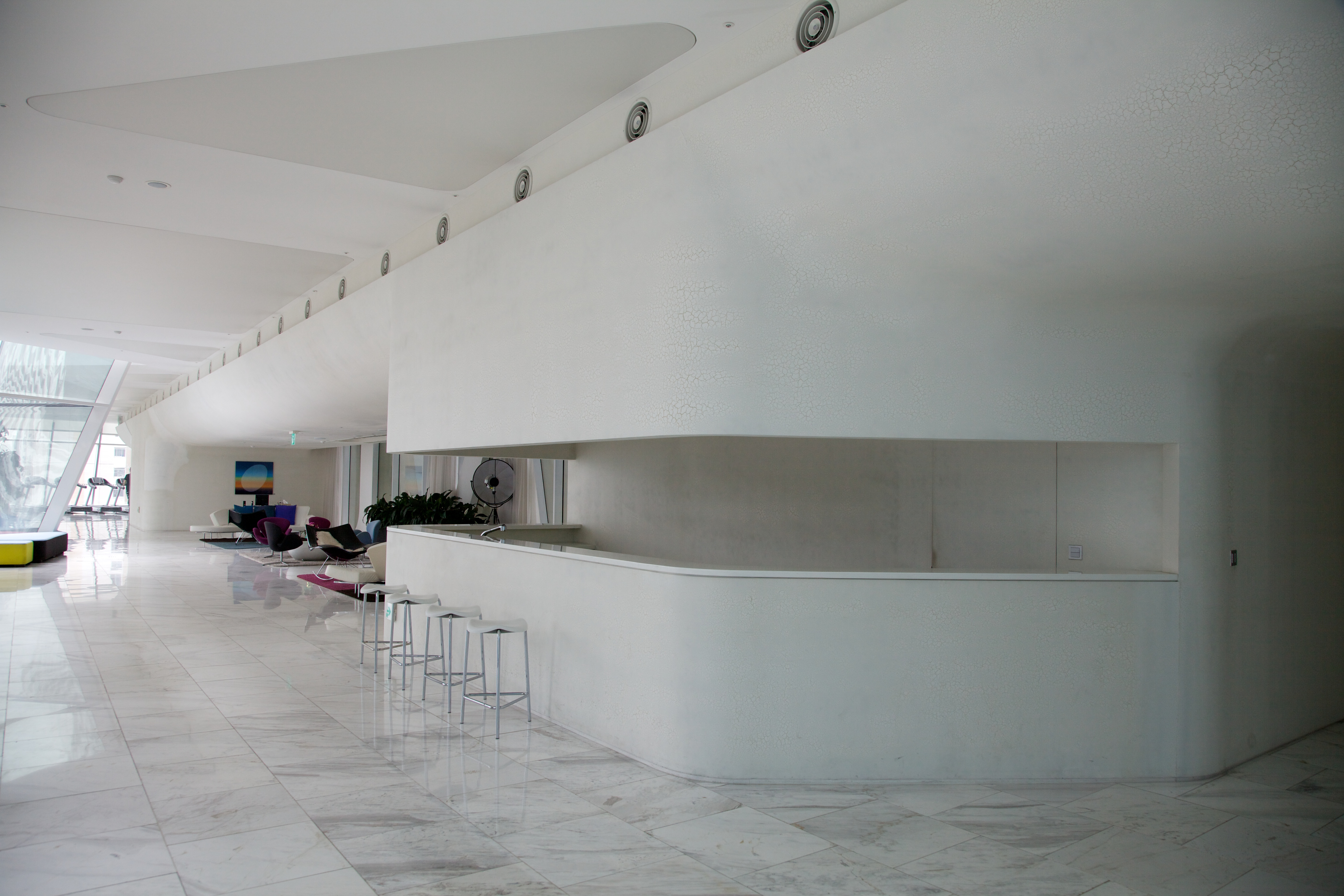
Lobby

Façade

== See also ==
- Seocho Garak Tower East
