= List of winners of the Golden Lion for Best National Participation at the Venice Biennale of Architecture =

These national pavilions and their authors have won the Golden Lion for Best National Participation at the Venice Biennale of Architecture.

== History ==
In 1996, the 6th International Architecture Exhibition, directed by Hans Hollein, introduced the Golden Lion for Best National Participant and the then-called Golden Lion for Best Interpretation of Exhibition. However, the following edition, held in 2000, awarded a "Special Prize for Best National Participant" instead.

In 2004, the award was reinstated as a Golden Lion. Two years later, it adopted its current name: Golden Lion for Best National Participation.

In 2014, the jury awarded an exceptional Silver Lion for Best National Participation to the Chilean pavilion, «Monolith Controversies», curated by Pedro Alonso and Hugo Palmarola.

As of 2025, 11 countries have received the Golden Lion for Best National Participation at the Venice Architecture Biennale. Japan (1996, 2012), Spain (2000, 2016), and Bahrain (2010, 2025) have each won the award twice.

== Winners ==
Year	Country	Title	Curator(s)	Ref.
1996	Japan			
2000	Spain			
2002	Netherlands		Herman Hertzberger, Folkert Stropsma, Dickens van der Werff, Tjeerd van de Sandt	
2004	Belgium	Kinshasa, the Imaginary City	Filip De Boeck and Koen Van Synghel	
2006	Denmark	CO-EVOLUTION	Henrik Valeur	
2008	Poland	Hotel Polonia. The afterlife of buildings	Nicolas Grospierre and Kobas Laksa	
2010	Bahrain	Reclaim	Noura Al-sayeh and Fuad Al-ansari	
2012	Japan	Architecture, possible here? Home-for-All	Toyo Ito	
2014	South Korea	Crow's Eye View: The Korean Peninsula	Minsuk Cho, Hyungmin Pai, and Changmo Ahn	
2016	Spain	UNFINISHED	Carlos Quintáns and Iñaqui Carnicero	
2018	Switzerland	Svizzera 240: House Tour	Alessandro Bosshard, Li Tavor, Matthew van der Ploeg and Ani Vihervaara	
2021	UAE	Wetland	Wael Al Awar and Kenichi Teramoto	
2023	Brazil	Terra	Gabriela de Matos and Paulo Tavares	
2025	Bahrain	Heatwave	Andrea Faraguna	

== See also ==
- Venice Biennale of Architecture
- List of Venice Biennale of Architecture exhibitions
- List of winners of the Golden Lion for Best Participation in the International Exhibition at the Venice Biennale of Architecture
