= Plastique Fantastique (Marco Canevacci and Yena Young) =

German/Greek artistic duo

Plastique Fantastique is an art duo of Yena Young and Marco Canevacci, based between Berlin and Athens. It began as an artistic collective founded in Berlin in 1999.

The duo creates large-scale pneumatic installations that serve as temporary architectural structures in public spaces. Its work encompasses art, architecture, design and performance, and explores the spatial, social and performative dimensions of public space.

In 2019, Plastique Fantastique presented Blurry Venice at the Venice Pavilion during the 58th Venice Biennale. In 2025, Yena Young's installation 30 Million Years Under the Pavilion was developed in collaboration with Plastique Fantastique for the Korean Pavilion at the 19th Venice Architecture Biennale.

== History ==
=== Founding ===
Plastique Fantastique was founded in Berlin in 1999 by Marco Canevacci and collaborators including Michael Heim, Pietro Balp and Raffaele Distefano.

The collective emerged from Berlin's underground cultural scene. Its early inflatable structures were developed for "Deli an der Schillingbrücke", a cultural venue and techno club in a former factory in Friedrichshain. According to Canevacci, the building lacked windows and heating, prompting the group to construct inflatable enclosures that could be heated with hot-air blowers. The structures were made by sealing polyethylene film with a household vacuum sealer.

== Members ==
=== Marco Canevacci ===
Marco Canevacci is an Italian artist and co-founder of Plastique Fantastique. He moved to Berlin in 1991 and studied architecture at the Technical University of Berlin from 1993 to 1999. His experiments with pneumatic structures began in the year he completed his studies.

=== Yena Young ===
Yena Young is a Berlin-based artist born in Seoul, South Korea. She studied architecture at Yonsei University in Seoul from 2001 to 2006 and spatial design at Aalto University in Helsinki, Finland, from 2008 to 2012, graduating with a Master of Arts degree. In her own artistic practice, Young explores speculative narratives.

She joined Plastique Fantastique in 2012.

== Work ==
Plastique Fantastique creates ephemeral architectures in urban and natural environments. The works are temporary and accessible, often allowing visitors to enter, gather, perform or otherwise inhabit spaces that are usually used for transit or have been neglected.

Their practice has been described as an exploration of the boundaries between public and private space, body and architecture, and permanence and impermanence.

== Selected works ==
- auruBOROS – Urban Memory and Collective Dream (2026), a temporary, gold-coloured pneumatic installation at New York's High Line beneath The Standard hotel.
- Berliner Wedding (und Scheidung) – Love, Law and Foreign Affairs (2025), a participatory installation and performance presented on 30 and 31 August on the forecourt of Wedding Town Hall in Berlin. Combining the pneumatic sound sculpture Double Heart with the inflatable ring RINGdeLUXE, the project explored the relationship between love, bureaucracy and marriage through staged pop-up weddings and express divorces.
- Polymeter (2025), an inflatable installation developed through the S+T+ARTS4Water II residency programme, hosted by GLUON. Combining synthetic and biodegradable membranes, including an inner membrane made from algae, the work addressed different material and ecological timescales. It was presented in Porous. Ports as Interspecies Dwelling at Villa Arson in Nice.
- 30 Million Years Under the Pavilion (2025), an installation by Yena Young developed in collaboration with Plastique Fantastique for the Korean Pavilion at the 19th Venice Architecture Biennale. The work combined speculative science and archaeological fiction.
- Trees & Traces (2023), an inflatable pavilion at Songhyeon Green Plaza, presented at the fourth Seoul Biennale of Architecture and Urbanism. Its reflective exterior and transparent interior explored the site's changing urban history.
- RINGdeLUXE (Paris, 2023), a reflective inflatable ring installed around the Passerelle Léopold-Sédar-Senghor for Nuit Blanche.
- Blurry Venice (2019), an installation presented at the Venice Pavilion during the 58th Venice Biennale.
- Loud Shadows | Liquid Events (2017), a collaborative performance environment created for the Oerol Festival on Terschelling in the Netherlands, with composer Kate Moore, musical ensemble The Stolz and dance company LeineRoebana. The installation combined inflatable structures with the trees of the Formerum forest to create interconnected performance spaces.
- Double Heart (2017), an interactive pneumatic sound sculpture that measures visitors' heartbeats and translates them into a shared soundscape.
- Liveboat – Chapter Five (2015), an inflatable installation at the former Tempelhof Airport in Berlin. Taking the form of an oversized lifeboat, the work addressed the refugee crisis through a multilingual soundscape combining passages from Homer's Odyssey with fragments of refugees' stories.
