= Bi-City Biennale of Urbanism/Architecture =

- Traditional Chinese: 深港城市\建築雙城雙年展
- Simplified Chinese: 深港城市\建筑双城双年展
Transcriptions
Standard Mandarin
- Hanyu Pinyin: Shēn Gǎng Chéngshì Jiànzhù Shuāngchéng Shuāng Nián Zhǎn
Yue: Cantonese
- Jyutping: sam1 gong2 sing4 si5 gin3 zuk1 soeng1 sing4 nin4 zin2

The Bi-City Biennale of Urbanism/Architecture, also known as the Urbanism\Architecture Bi-City Biennale (UABB) of Shenzhen and Hong Kong, was founded in 2005. It has been held every two years since. It is considered the world's only Biennale or Biennial exhibition to focus specifically on urbanism and urbanisation.

The Biennale is a cooperative cultural event that is shared by the two cities under a similar theme. The selection process of the Hong Kong and Shenzhen curatorial teams are independent processes governed by different procedures and organisations. The exhibition also takes place in different venues in Hong Kong and Shenzhen, with different exhibitors, during similar but slightly differing time periods.

Originally organised by the Shenzhen Public Art Center, the inaugural Biennale took place in Shenzhen and attracted over a million visitors. The Biennale started being organised in Hong Kong in January 2008, with the exhibition "Refabricating City" at the Central Police Station Compound.

== UABB themes, venues, and curators ==
Each edition of UABB has had a different curatorial team, themes, and exhibitions:

=== 2005. Exhibition Theme: "City, Open Door!" ===
- Chief curator: Yung Ho CHANG.
- Exhibition period: December 10, 2005 – March 10, 2006.
- Venue: OCT Contemporary Art Terminal (South area of OCT-LOFT), Shenzhen.

=== 2007. Exhibition Themes: "City of Expiration and Regeneration" (Shenzhen) and "Refabricating City" (Hong Kong). ===
- Chief curator (Shenzhen): MA Qingyun. Lead curator (Hong Kong): WANG Weijen.
- Exhibition periods: December 8, 2007 – March 9, 2008 (Shenzhen). January 10, 2008 – March 15, 2008 (Hong Kong).
- Venues: North area of OCT-LOFT (Shenzhen). Central Police Station Compound (Hong Kong).

=== 2009. Exhibition Theme: "City Mobilization". ===
- Chief curator (Shenzhen): OU Ning. Chief curator (Hong Kong): Marisa Yiu.
- Exhibition periods: December 6, 2009 – January 23, 2010 (Shenzhen). December 4 2009 – February 27, 2010 (Hong Kong).
- Main Venues: Shenzhen Civic Square (Shenzhen). West Kowloon Cultural District (Hong Kong). Sub Venues: Shenzhen Bay Avenue and Yitian Holiday Plaza (Shenzhen). This was the first cultural event of international scale to take place in the West Kowloon Cultural District.

=== 2011. Exhibition Theme: "Architecture creates cities. Cities create architecture." (Shenzhen) and "Tri-Ciprocal Cities: The Time, The Place, The People" (Hong Kong). ===
- Chief curator (Shenzhen): Terence Riley. Chief curators (Hong Kong): Gene K. King and Anderson Lee.
- Exhibition periods: December 8, 2011 – February 19, 2012 (Shenzhen). 15 February – 23 April, 2012 (Hong Kong).
- Main Venues: Shenzhen Civic Square and OCT-LOFT (Shenzhen). Hong Kong Heritage Discovery Center and Kowloon Park, Tsim Sha Tsui, Kowloon, Hong Kong.

=== 2013. Exhibition Theme: "Urban Border" (Shenzhen) and "Beyond the Urban Edge: The Ideal City?” (Hong Kong). ===
- Curator / Creative Director: Ole Bouman, curators / Academic Directors: Li Xiangning + Jeffrey Johnson (Shenzhen). Chief curator (Hong Kong): Colin Fournier.
- Exhibition periods: December 6, 2013 – February 28, 2014 (Shenzhen). December 11, 2013 – February 28, 2014.
- Venues: Shekou Industrial Zone, Nanshan District (Shenzhen). Venue A: Value Factory (former Guangdong Float Glass Factory); Venue B: Border Warehouse (the Old Warehouse at Shekou FerryTerminal). Kwun Tong Ferry Pier and Fly the Flyover 01 of the Energizing Kowloon East Office (Hong Kong).

=== 2015. Theme: "Re-Living The City" (Shenzhen) and "Visions 2050: Lifestyle and the City" (Hong Kong). ===
- Curatorial Team (Shenzhen): Aaron Betsky, Alfredo Brillembourg, Hubert Klumpner, Doreen Heng Liu. Sub-Venue Curatorial Team (Shenzhen): Yong Yang / See You Tomorrow. Chief curator (Hong Kong): Christine Hawley.
- Exhibition periods: December 4, 2015 — February 28, 2016 (Shenzhen). December 11, 2015 — February 28, 2016 (Hong Kong).
- Main Venues: Shekou: DaCheng Flour Factory and No. 8 Warehouse (Shenzhen). Hong Kong Heritage Discovery Centre (Hong Kong). Sub-Venue: Longgang District: Xipu New Residence (Shenzhen).

=== 2017. Theme: "Cities, Grow in Difference" ===
- Curatorial Team (Shenzhen): Hou Hanru, Liu Xiaodu, and Meng Yan. Chief curator (Hong Kong): CHAN Lai-Kiu.
- Exhibition periods: December 15, 2017 — March 17, 2018 (Shenzhen). December 12, 2017 — February 11, 2018 (Hong Kong).
- Main Venues: Nantou Old Town in Nanshan district (Shenzhen). (Shenzhen) and "City Smarts: Density 2.0" (Hong Kong). Kowloon Park in Tsim Sha Tsui (Hong Kong).

== Official Publications ==
- Arjen Oosterman (Author, Editor), Ole Bouman (Author), Rem Koolhaas (Author), Mark Wigley(Author), Brendan Cormier (Editor). "Urban Border." Volume #39 (Archis, 2014). ISBN 978-9077966396
- Betsky, Aaron (Author), Aflredo Brillembourg (Author), Hubert Klumpner (Author), Doreen Heng Liu (Author), Gideon Fink Shapiro (Editor). Re-Living the City. Actar: 2016. ISBN 978-1945150036
