= Great Mission New Neighborhood, Tricolor Neighborhood =

Great Mission New Neighborhood, Tricolor Neighborhood (GMBNBT)
- Gran Misión Barrio Nuevo, Barrio Tricolor
- Type of project: Bolivarian mission
- Country: Venezuela
- Ministry: Ministerio del Poder Popular para Vivienda y Hábitat
- Key people: Hugo Chávez, Nicolás Maduro
- Launched: 9 August 2009; 16 years ago
- Status: Active
- Website: www.barriotricolor.gob.ve

Great Mission New Neighborhood, Tricolor Neighborhood (Spanish: Gran Misión Barrio Nuevo, Barrio Tricolor, GMBNBT) is a programme of the Government of Venezuela Bolivarian missions to rehabilitate homes. It was launched by the Hugo Chávez administration on August 9, 2009.

Originally launched with the range of Mission, the Nicolás Maduro administration raised the status of the programme to Great Mission in 2013.

== See also ==
- Great Mission Housing Venezuela
