= List of winners of the Golden Lion for Best Participation in the International Exhibition at the Venice Biennale of Architecture =

These projects and their authors have won the Golden Lion for Best Participation in the International Exhibition at the Venice Biennale of Architecture.

== History ==
In 1996, the 6th International Architecture Exhibition, directed by Hans Hollein, introduced the Golden Lion for Best Interpretation of the International Exhibition, then called the «Golden Lion for Best Interpretation of Exhibition».

The description and criteria for the prize have changed over time. In its first edition, a series of European architects were awarded; in the following edition, a single architect received the prize—Jean Nouvel; and in the subsequent edition, a built project was recognized.

In 2014, curator Rem Koolhaas proposed dedicating the Arsenale to a single theme —«Italy»— and joining other sectors of La Biennale di Venezia —Cinema, Dance, Music, and Theater— "to collectively contribute to a comprehensive portrait of the host country." As a result, the highest honor in the International Exhibition of that edition was «Silver Lion for the Best Research Project of the section Monditalia, part of the International Exhibition».

== Winners ==
Year	Country	Title	Author(s)	Ref.
1996	Multiple countries		Odile Decq, Benoît Cornette, Juha Kaakko, Ilkka Laine, Kimmo Liimatainen, Jari Tirkkonen, Enric Miralles	
2000	France		Jean Nouvel	
2002	Portugal	Iberê Camargo Foundation	Alvaro Siza Vieira	
2004	Japan		Studio SANAA (Kazuyo Sejima + Ryue Nishizawa)	
2006	Not awarded			
2008	United States	Recycled Toys Furniture	Greg Lynn	
2010	Japan		junya.ishigami+associates	
2012	Multiple countries		Urban-Think Tank (Alfredo Brillembourg, Hubert Klumpner), Justin McGuirk, and Iwan Baan	
2014	Spain	Sales Oddity. Milano 2 and the Politics of Direct-to-home TV Urbanism	Andrés Jaque / Office for Political Innovation	
2016	Paraguay	Breaking The Siege	Gabinete de Arquitectura (Solano Benitez and Gloria Cabral)	
2018	Portugal	Vol de jour	Eduardo Souto de Moura	
2021	Germany	Instances of Urban Practice	raumlaborberlin	
2023	Palestine, Sweden	Ente di Decolonizzazione – Borgo Rizza	DAAR (Alessandro Petti and Sandi Hilal)	
2025	United States	Canal Café	Diller Scofidio + Renfro, Natural Systems Utilities, SODAI, Aaron Betsky, and Davide Oldani	

== See also ==
- Venice Biennale of Architecture
- List of Venice Biennale of Architecture exhibitions
- List of winners of the Golden Lion for Best National Participation at the Venice Biennale of Architecture
