= August 2018 Venezuela earthquake =

Earthquake affecting South America and the Caribbean

August 21st earthquake
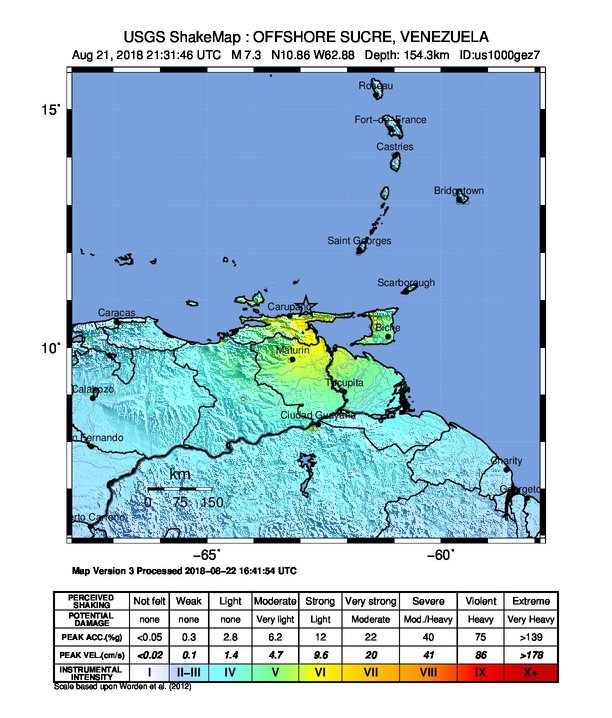
- Shakemap for the August 21st 2018 Venezuela earthquake.

- Location within Venezuela
- UTC time: 2018-08-21 21:31:42
- ISC event: 612616014
- USGS-ANSS: ComCat
- Local date: August 21, 2018
- Local time: 5:31:42 PM VET
- Magnitude: 7.3 M_{w}
- Depth: 146.8 km (91 mi)
- Epicenter: 10.773°N 62.902°W
- Type: Oblique-reverse
- Total damage: USD $7+ million
- Max. intensity: MMI VII (Very strong)
- Tsunami: No
- Landslides: Yes
- Aftershocks: ~24
- Casualties: 6 dead (indirect), 122 injured

On August 21, 2018, a magnitude 7.3 earthquake struck just off the northern coast of Venezuela, near Cariaco, Sucre. The earthquake, at the time, was thought to be the largest in the country since the 1900 San Narciso earthquake. It prompted evacuations in Caracas, and caused shaking in Colombia, Guyana, Brazil, Grenada, Dominica, Barbados, St. Vincent and the Grenadines, St. Lucia, and Trinidad and Tobago, the last of which also suffered damage and brief phone and power outages from about 100 miles away. A tsunami was not expected, though the Pacific Tsunami Warning Center warned of wave potential, and an alert had been broadcast for tsunami waves along coastlines. In terms of damage, concrete fell from the unfinished Tower of David skyscraper, blocking the sidewalk and closing traffic.

According to the governor of Sucre State, there were initially no reports of fatalities in the area. Though several sources from the Venezuelan government reported no injuries, there were reports of injuries in a shopping centre in Cumaná, close to the epicentre, when an escalator collapsed. Later, six people were confirmed dead, after heart attacks during the quake from shock., including one from neighboring Trinidad and Tobago. Interior Minister Néstor Reverol maintained that there were no fatalities.

The earthquakes follow a series of related earthquakes two weeks earlier in neighbouring Colombia, including brief shakes of 6.1 and 5.8 magnitude on August 7.

== Earthquake ==
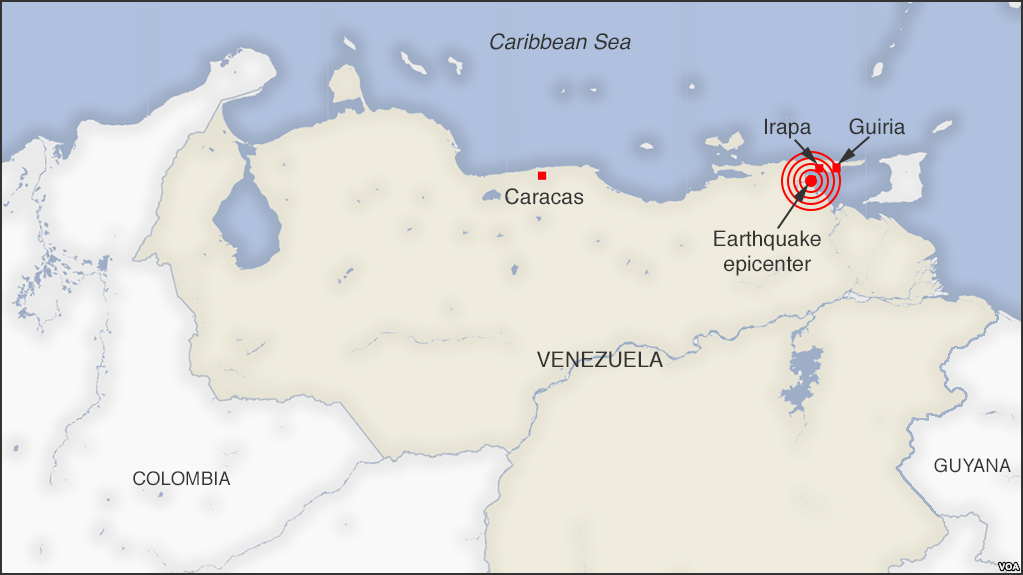
Epicentre of the August 21st earthquake

The epicentre is reported to be just east of Carúpano, and at a depth of 123 km (76 mi). The Venezuelan capital, Caracas, is around 622 km (386 mi) from this site, and still shook, as did Bogotá, the Colombian capital nearly 2,000 km (1,200 mi) away. The United States Geological Survey reported the quake as 7.3 (after an initial report of 6.8), though the Colombian Geological Service reported it as 7.0. The Venezuelan Interior Minister Néstor Reverol reported that the earthquake was 6.3. The U.S. Pacific Tsunami Warning Center instead reported the quake as 7.4.

Venezuela's coast at Cariaco lies on the El Pilar fault of the Caribbean and South American plates, with the latter subducting under the former when the fault turns perpendicular to the coastline. Though Caracas is a long distance from the epicentre, because it is still on the fault line at the San Sebastian fault the tremor was still quite powerful. A seismologist from the University of Southampton said that the two plates usually experience "horizontal differential motion" (the Caribbean plate moves eastward, the South American plate moves westward, and they strike and catch against each other) but that the earthquake being so deep indicated that it was not "directly related to transform faulting [or] strike-slip faulting", suggesting that the quake may have been caused by the "edge of the South American plate that is subducting under the Lesser Antilles arc" being involved.

CNN reported that someone based in Güiria, 43 miles from the epicentre, felt three aftershocks. A seismograph at Virginia Tech, a university in the northern United States, registered the earthquake. The University of the West Indies Seismic Research Centre recorded aftershocks throughout the region from shortly after the main quake.

Witnesses and news sources report that during the quake, people were reluctant to leave some buildings, in particular banks because they were "desperate to withdraw the limited notes they're authorised to claim in the cash-strapped country" so "didn't want to leave".

=== Irregularity ===
Multiple experts remarked on how the seismological activity that caused the earthquake was unusual. Juan Cigala, from the Seismology Department of the Iquique Emergency Center, Mexico, explained that the earthquake was "an exceptional event" and also "expressed surprise" at the subsequent earthquake as well as aftershocks of over 4.0 magnitude, something that "hasn't happened before". He summarised that "the Earth is behaving in a different way".

Cigala also mentioned that the direction of the forces from the plates contacting was unusual, explaining why the earthquake was felt for thousands of miles in multiple directions. He added that this, as well as the continual plate movement since the earthquake, means there will "continue to be telluric events in the area", and a likelihood of more quakes.

== Damage ==
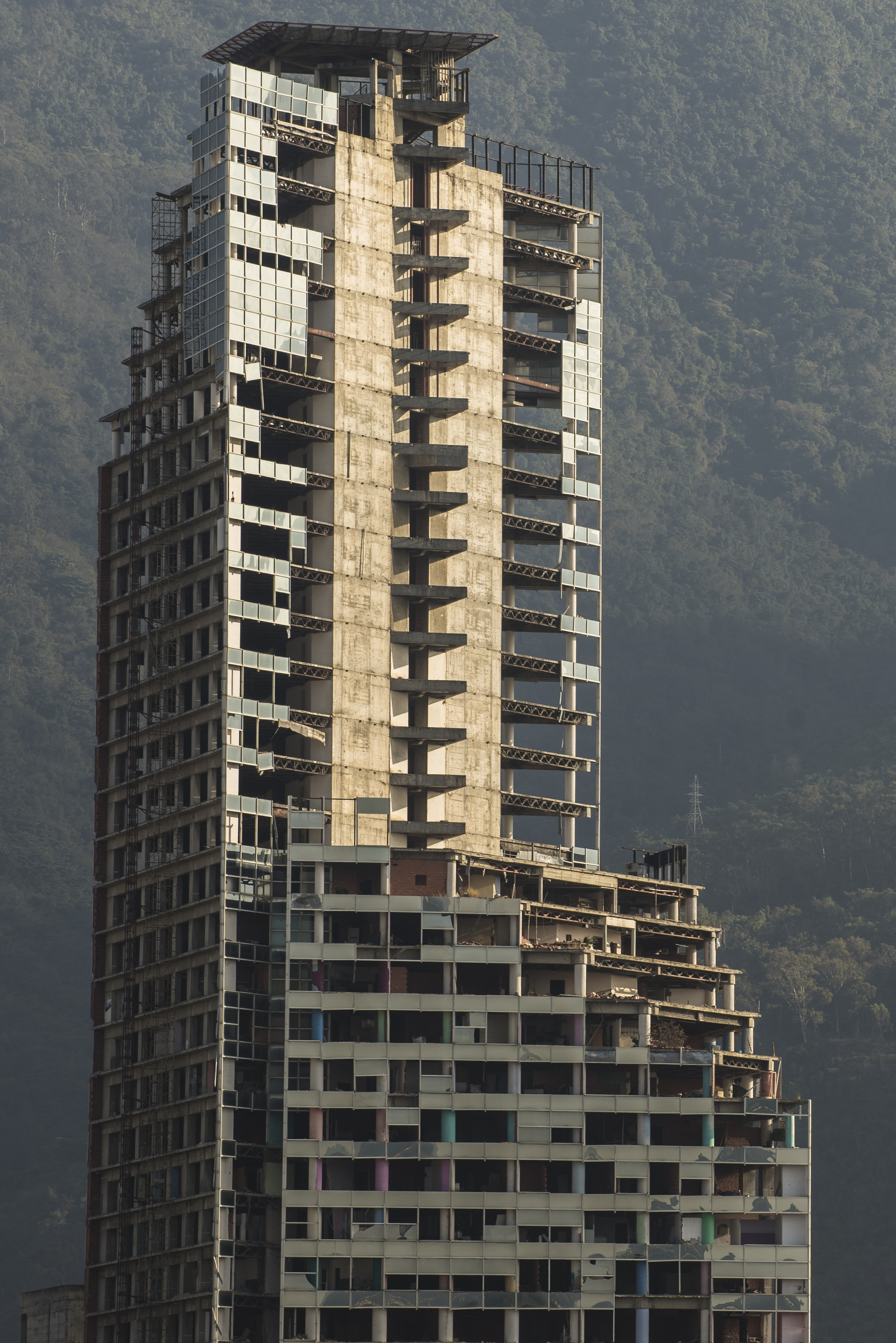
The Centro Financiero Confinanzas, "Tower of David", which was damaged

Bogotá International Airport was briefly closed to check for runway damage.

The Tower of David, the second tallest building in Venezuela and 11th tallest in South America, is reported to have sustained structural damage and is now leaning. However, according to Randy Rodríguez, national director of Civil Protection, the Caracas fire service inspected the tower and deemed it has no threat of falling. The telephone and internet service in Caracas was also interrupted.

In Sucre, the epicenter of the quake, at least 47 homes and two schools were damaged, and multiple injuries occurred in Cariaco after an escalator collapsed. In Puerto Ordaz, Bolívar, numerous homes and buildings were damaged.

A video surfaced of a landslide in which part of a Caribbean island mountain collapsed into the sea.

In Trinidad and Tobago, temporary power outages were reported in Arima, Valsayn, and other areas in the east of the island of Trinidad, and a person died of a heart attack in Arima. Across the country, 218 homes were reportedly affected, with the majority of them sustaining minor damage. Ninety-five schools were also impacted.

In Grenada, rockfalls and ground cracks were reported.

Several sources questioned if the shaking could have disturbed Venezuela's extensive oil reserves, potentially damaging the industry in the country.

== Aftermath ==
The earthquake was, in its immediate aftermath, judged as negative for the Venezuelan government. Diosdado Cabello, president of the Constituent National Assembly in the country, was giving a national compulsory broadcast at the moment of the earthquake, with his "confused" and "concerned" response being to just stop talking and "look from side to side", as reported by The Guardian, Time, and Associated Press shortly after the event. The Venezuelan government was also criticised as being unprepared for natural disasters, with "ambulances grounded" in the nation.

Edwin Rojas, a PSUV government deputy and Governor of the state in which the earthquake hit, called the earthquake reports and tsunami warning "psychological terrorism".

Several people looked deeper into the occurrence of the earthquakes, which was "interpreted as a political metaphor for [Venezuela's] teetering regime". A BBC Caribbean correspondent shared a photo of the Tower of David on Twitter, commenting that the abandoned bank building was "verging on collapse", describing it as an apt "economic metaphor" for Venezuela. Similarly, The Wall Street Journal's Latin America editor joked that the "real earthquake" matched "Venezuela's economic earthquake".

The public of Venezuela also reacted in such fashion, with reports that there were many new "'what else could go wrong' memes", adding natural disasters to the list of growing crises of the nation, or comparing the earthquake to the new currency of the nation released that day, one tweet remarking on the devaluation by saying "Colombia: earthquake with a 7.7 magnitude according to the Richter magnitude scale. Venezuela: earthquake of 0.00077 Richter Soberanos" and another saying "Inflation in Venezuela is so bad that the 7.3 magnitude earthquake has turned into 78093.3. The strongest in history". There were also comments despairing that in the social media videos of supermarkets shaking, it didn't look as dramatic as the Trinidadian counterparts where products were falling off shelves – because in Venezuela there weren't any products on the shelves to begin with.

The BBC Venezuela correspondent said that the earthquake was actually welcome: that people "were amused by an event, which had distracted them from the tough realities of everyday life".

The Governor of the US State of Florida, Rick Scott, said a few hours after the quake that he had spoken with Carlos Trujillo about the earthquake and that "[Venezuelan President] Maduro should allow aid into Venezuela so anyone who may be affected can get the proper help".

The Foreign and Commonwealth Office gave travel warnings for Trinidad and Tobago, with the possibility of later adding them for Colombia, Venezuela, and Guyana. Though buildings cracked and shifted in Venezuela, there was more falling debris on the nearby island of Trinidad, which caused more concern. There was also concern for falling glass in both nations.

== Second earthquake ==
August 22 earthquake
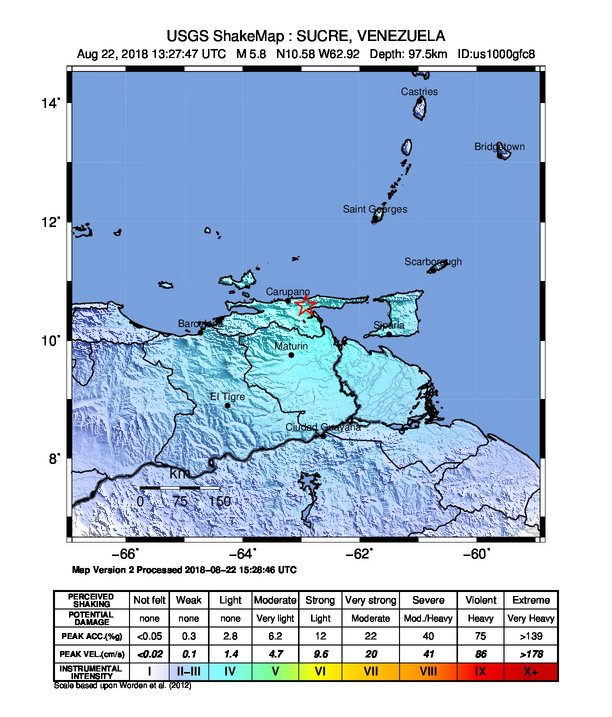
- Shakemap for the August 22, 2018 Venezuela earthquake.

- Location within Venezuela
- UTC time: 2018-08-22 13:27:47
- ISC event
- USGS-ANSS: ComCat
- Local date: August 22, 2018
- Local time: 9:27:47 AM VET
- Magnitude: 5.8 M_{w}
- Depth: 108.0 km (67 mi)
- Epicenter: 10.659°N 62.929°W
- Max. intensity: MMI V (Moderate)

A second earthquake occurred in the morning of the following day, slightly more central to Venezuela at 9 km West from Yaguaraparo, measuring 5.7 according to local reports but confirmed as 5.8 by the US Geological Survey. This quake was inland in Venezuela. A sitting of the Venezuelan National Assembly in Caracas was evacuated when the hall began shaking at 9:27am. The sitting was of the Internal Affairs Commission, discussing the case of detained representative Juan Requesens. There had been multiple smaller aftershocks after the first earthquake, but this shock was registered as a distinct event, the Colombian Geological Service initially recording it as 5.9 magnitude. This quake was also felt across Venezuela and Trinidad.

No tsunami warning was given, because of the inland origin. The Venezuelan geological authority FUNVISIS reported that the earthquake was at a depth of 22.9 km, though the US Geological Survey said it was 97.5 km deep.

Images were shared that showed the structural damage of Tower of David having been worsened by the second earthquake. The Venezuelan ambassador in St. Lucia assured this country that after the two earthquakes, Venezuela had activated emergency protocols.

== See also ==
- 1967 Caracas earthquake
- List of earthquakes in 2018
- List of earthquakes in Venezuela
