= Seocho Garak Tower East =

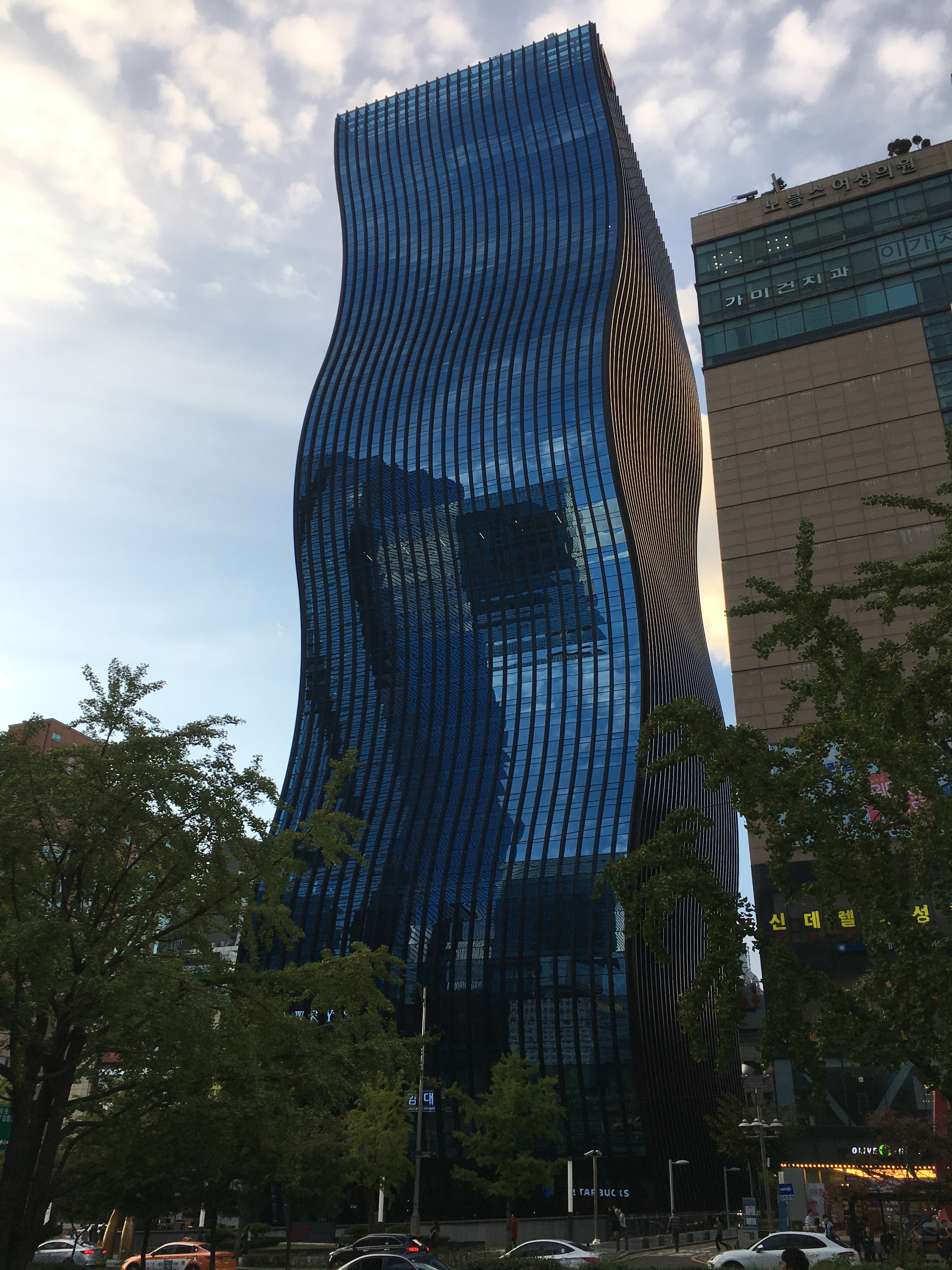
- Interactive map of the Seocho Garak Tower East area
- Alternative names: GT Tower East

General information
- Status: Completed
- Type: Office
- Location: Seoul, South Korea
- Coordinates: 37°29′53″N 127°1′33″E
- Construction started: 2008
- Completed: 2011
- Owner: GT Construction

Height
- Roof: 130.1 m (427 ft)

Technical details
- Floor count: 24
- Floor area: 54,530 m^{2} (587,000 sq ft)

Design and construction
- Architect: Het Architecten Consort
- Developer: GT Construction
- Structural engineer: Hanbit Structural Engineering Company
- Main contractor: Daelim

The Seocho Garak Tower East is a skyscraper located in Seoul, South Korea. Construction of the 130.1 m (427 ft), 24-storey building began in 2008 and it was finished in 2011. The building was designed by ArchitectenConsort. (Later renamed to Convexarchitecten.)
