= David Brillembourg =

Venezuelan tycoon (1942–1993)

Jorge David Brillembourg
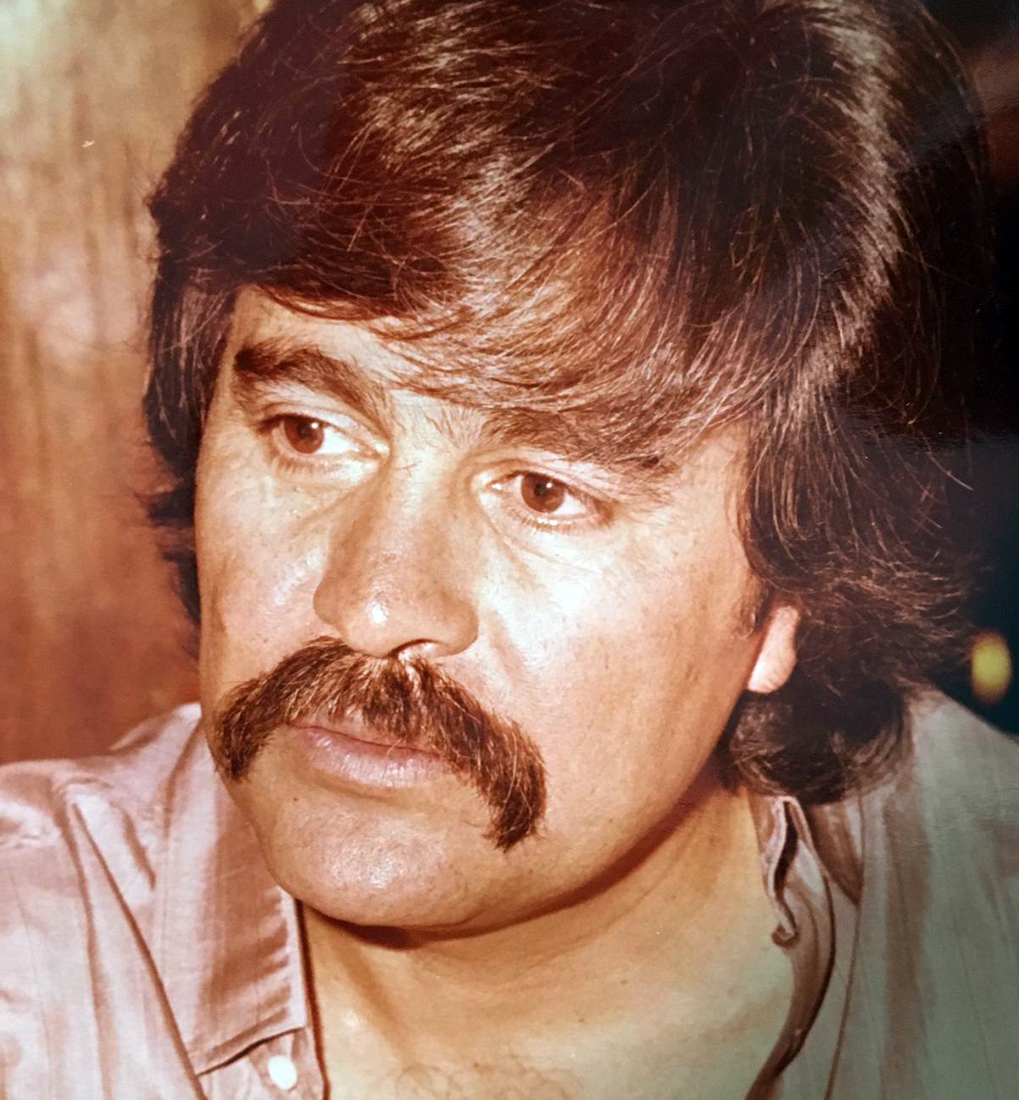
- Born: December 14, 1942; Maracaibo, Venezuela
- Died: April 12, 1993 (aged 51); Houston, Texas, U.S.
- Education: Syracuse University, Universidad Central de Venezuela
- Occupations: President and owner of Grupo Confinanzas, Banco Metropolitano, Congressman Deputy
- Spouse: Adelaida Tanya Capriles López
- Children: Rene Brillembourg Capriles; Elke Brillembourg; Tanya Brillembourg; David Daniel Brillembourg Capriles; Nathalie Brillembourg Capriles; David Brillembourg Vera, Giovanna Gabriela Brillembourg Vera

Jorge David Brillembourg (December 14, 1942 - April 12, 1993) was a Venezuelan economist and businessman, president of Grupo Confinanzas, congressman deputy and main investor of Centro Financiero Confinanzas (Tower of David).

== Career ==
In 1961, he graduated with a degree in economics from the Central University of Venezuela (UCV). The following year, he obtained a Master of Business Administration, Finance Specialty from Syracuse University (United States).

He began to work as an official of the Central Bank of Venezuela in 1959 and remained there until 1964, when he began to occupy the vice-presidency of Inversiones Capriles. From there, he goes through the Finalven Group, the Eastern Mortgage Bank, the Textiven Group and the Veintiuno Consortium.

In 1985, he founded the Confinanzas Banco Hipotecario which, after several acquisitions -such as that of Banco Metropolitano- and mergers, was renamed Sociedad Financiera Confinanzas (or Grupo Confinanzas). This institution was intervened by FOGADE in 1994 in the middle of the banking crisis.

The fortune he amassed during the 1980s thanks to the boom in the stock market led to him being nicknamed "King David" of Venezuelan finance.

In 1990, the Public Offering of Shares that he launched on Cervecera Nacional caused him to go to war with the largest industrial and financial consortium in the country at the time, Grupo Polar-Banco Provincial. His gain from selling the shares he had obtained was approximately $500 million.

In 1964, at the age of 25, he was elected for the first time as a deputy to the National Congress for the Federal District as an independent candidate on the COPEI party plates. He repeats as legislator in the periods of 1969-1973 and 1978–1983.

=== Tower of David ===
In 1990, Brillembourg began the construction of the Confinanzas Financial Center, a modern complex of 6 buildings that would be the headquarters of the banks of its group. At that time, Tower A in the center, with 45 floors, would be the third tallest skyscraper in the country and the eighth in Latin America.

In 1994 (one year after Brillembourg's death), with construction 70% advanced, the banking crisis in Venezuela exploded, the main banks of the country were intervened -among them, those of the Sociedad Financiera Confinanzas- and construction passed at the hands of the State through FOGADE, who paralyze the work. By that time, it was known as "The Tower of David" (La Torre de David) in honor of the businessman.

In 2001, FOGADE put the building up for auction with a base price of $60 million, but no entity, private or public, showed interest in it. It was abandoned and, from there, occupied by illegal residents, making it the largest vertical favela in Latin America until its eviction in 2015.

== Art ==
Together with his wife, Tanya Capriles de Brillembourg, he is considered, even today, one of the greatest art collectors in Latin America. He owns pieces such as “Woman with Bird” by Wifredo Lam (1955), “Abstract Composition” by Roberto Matta (1949), “Figura Bajo un-Uvero” by Armando Reveron (1920), “El Nuncio” by Fernando Botero (1962) and “Still Life with Lemons” by Diego Rivera (1916).

The series of more than 100 works, which has been exhibited in various museums such as the Museum of Fine Arts (MFAH) in Houston in 2013, shows the contribution to surrealism, cubism and constructionism of Latin American artists who lived in Europe in the 20th century.

== Horse riding ==
He was the breeder and owner of the David's Farm (United States) and Haras Tamarú (Venezuela) crews. From David's Farm came horses such as Alydavid (Winner of the 1991 Churchill Downs Derby Trial), Niccolo Polo, Orne and D.C. Tenacius. From Haras Tamarú there are classics of Venezuelan horse riding such as Backyard, Modena, Background, Volcana, Marfe, Great Neige and Boche Clavao.

In 1987, he was ranked second in the general statistics of the INH as the best breeder in the country.

In 1998, his specimen Telefónico was chosen as the stallion leader by his breeder peers.

== Gallery ==
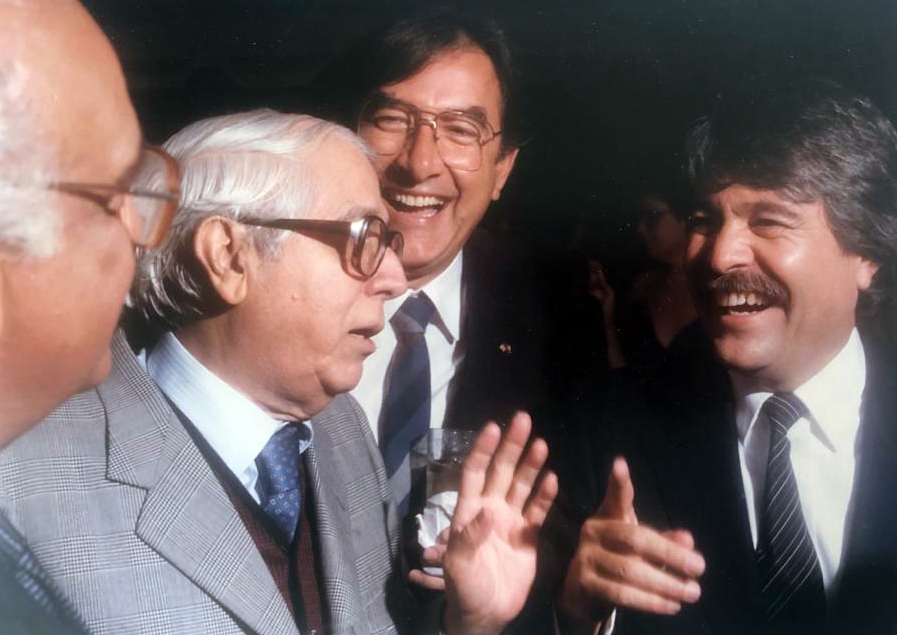
David Brillembourg talking with venezuelan politicians

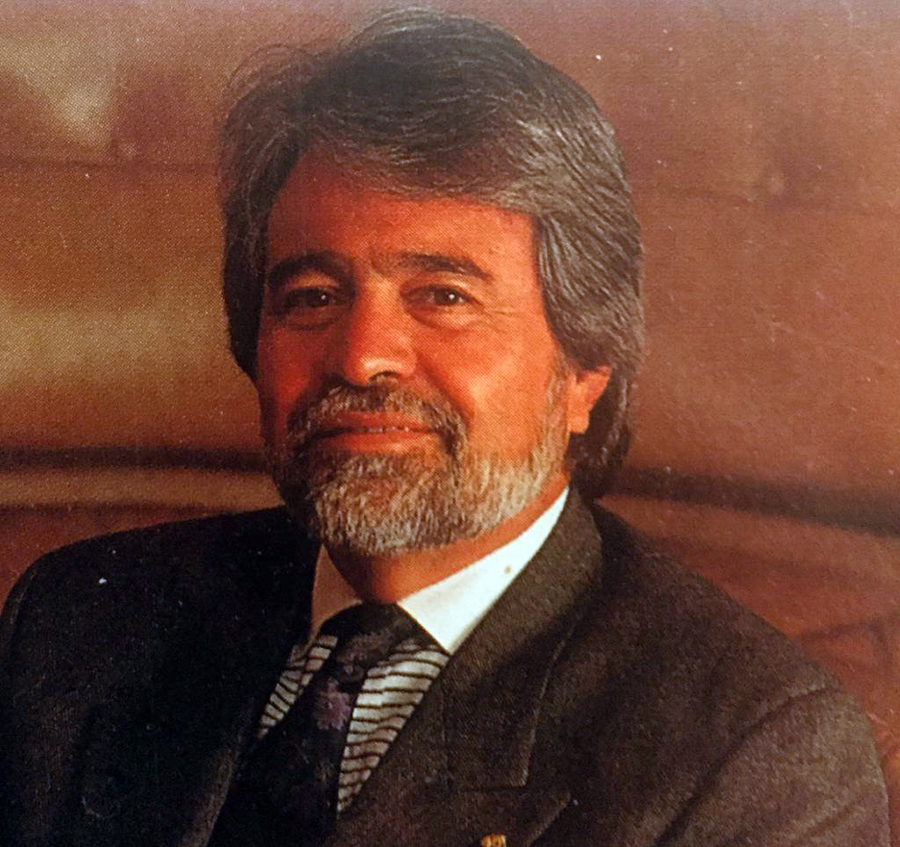
David Brillembourg Press Photo

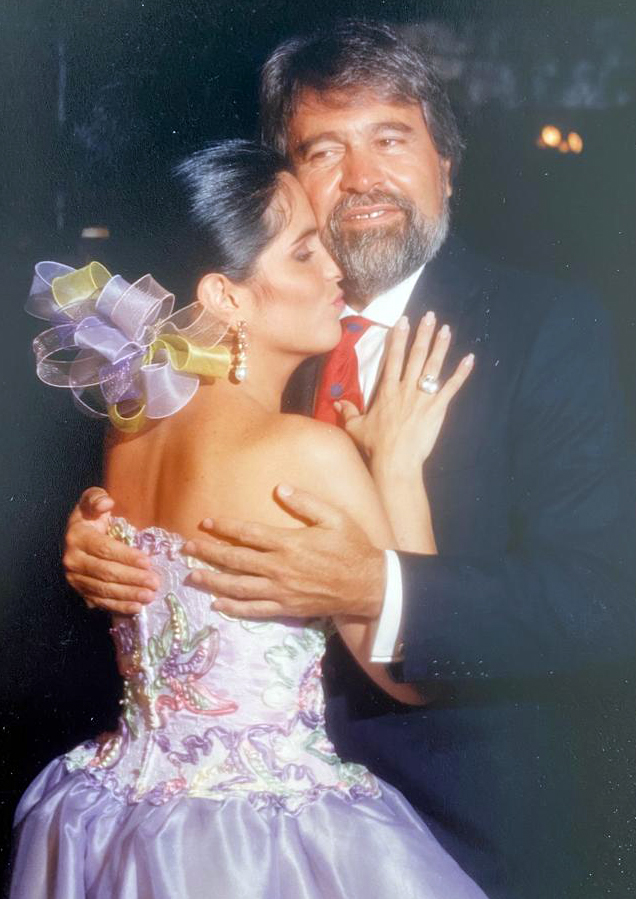
David Brillembourg and his daughter

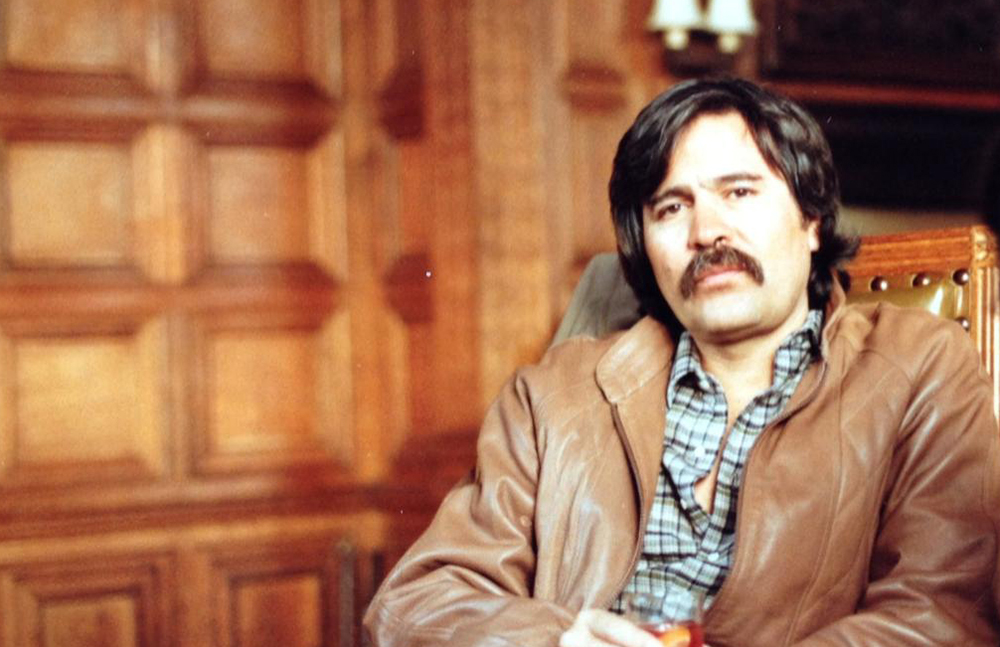
David Brillembourg Press Photo

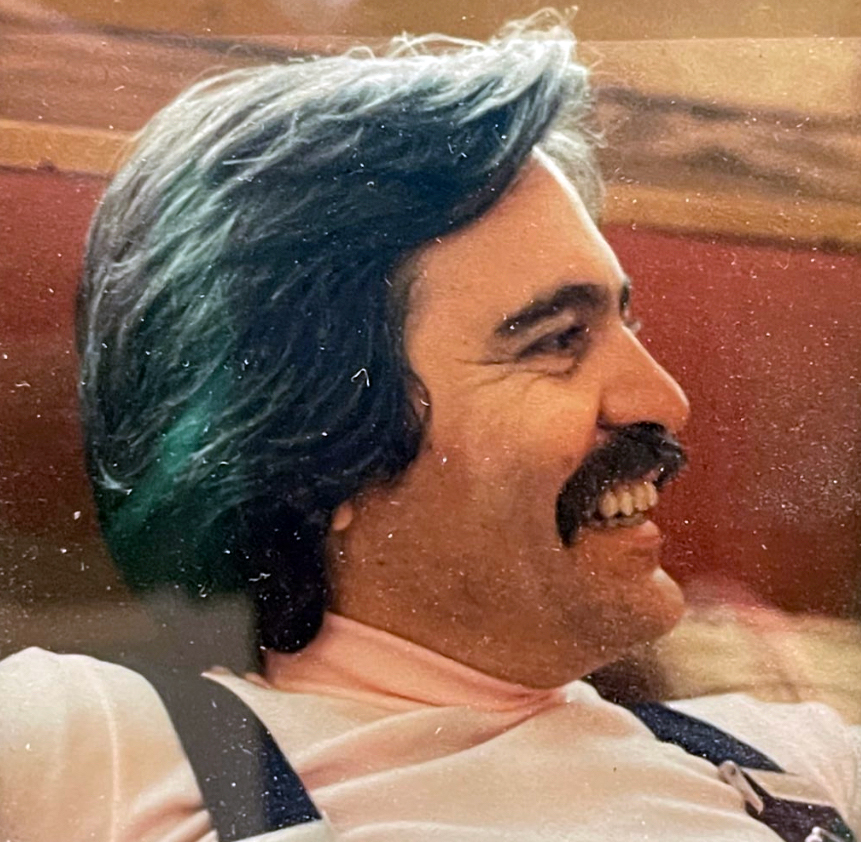
David Brillembourg

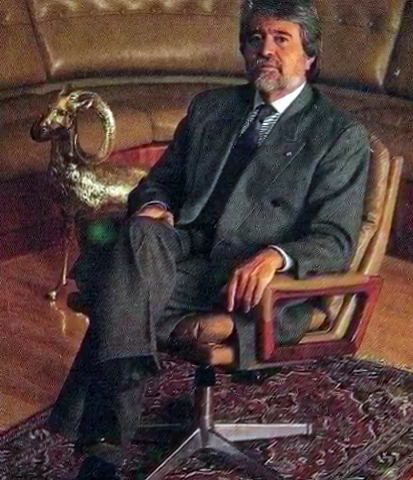
David Brillembourg Press Photo

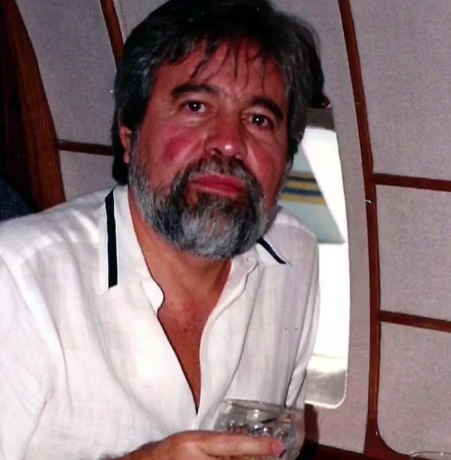
David Brillembourg at his airplane

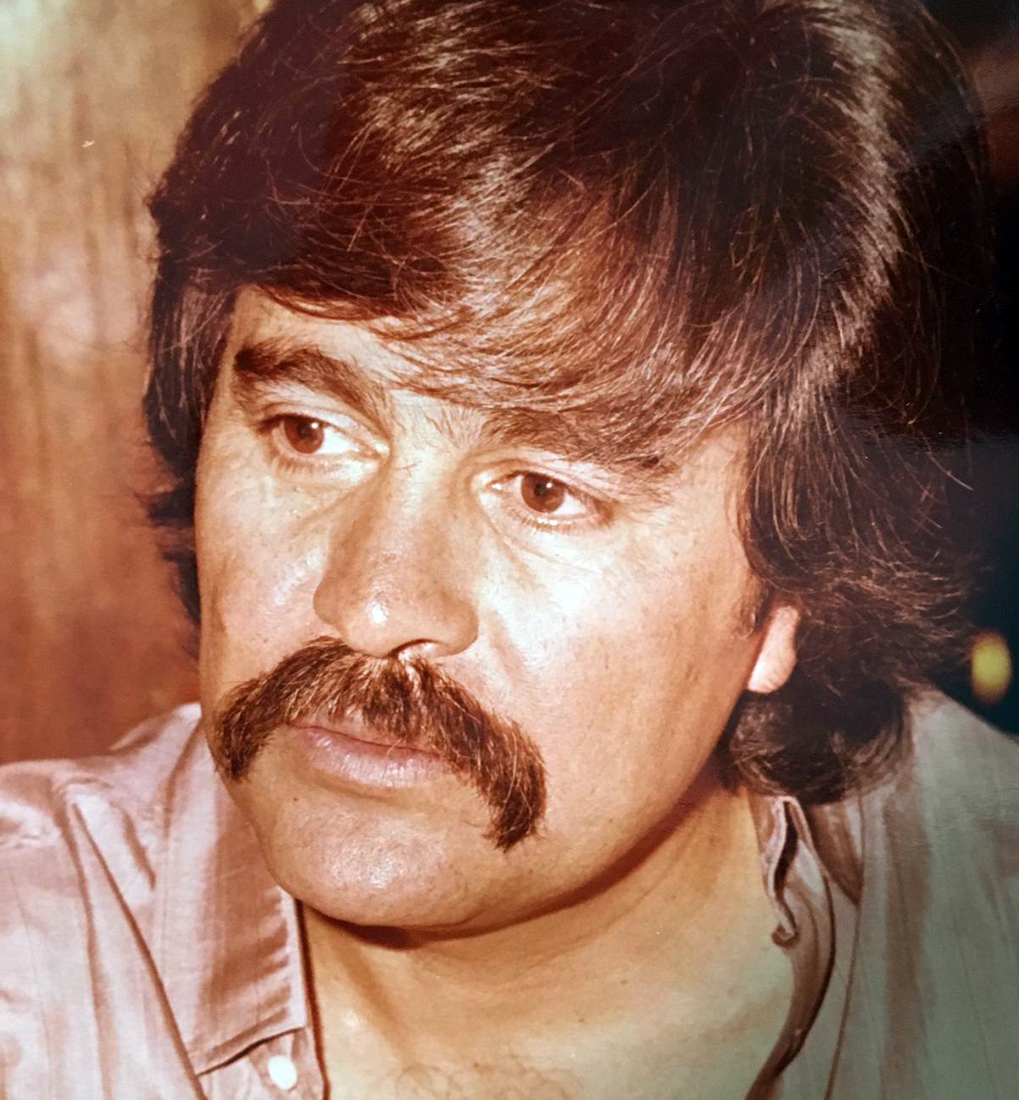
David Brillembourg
