= Gloria Cabral =

Paraguayan architect

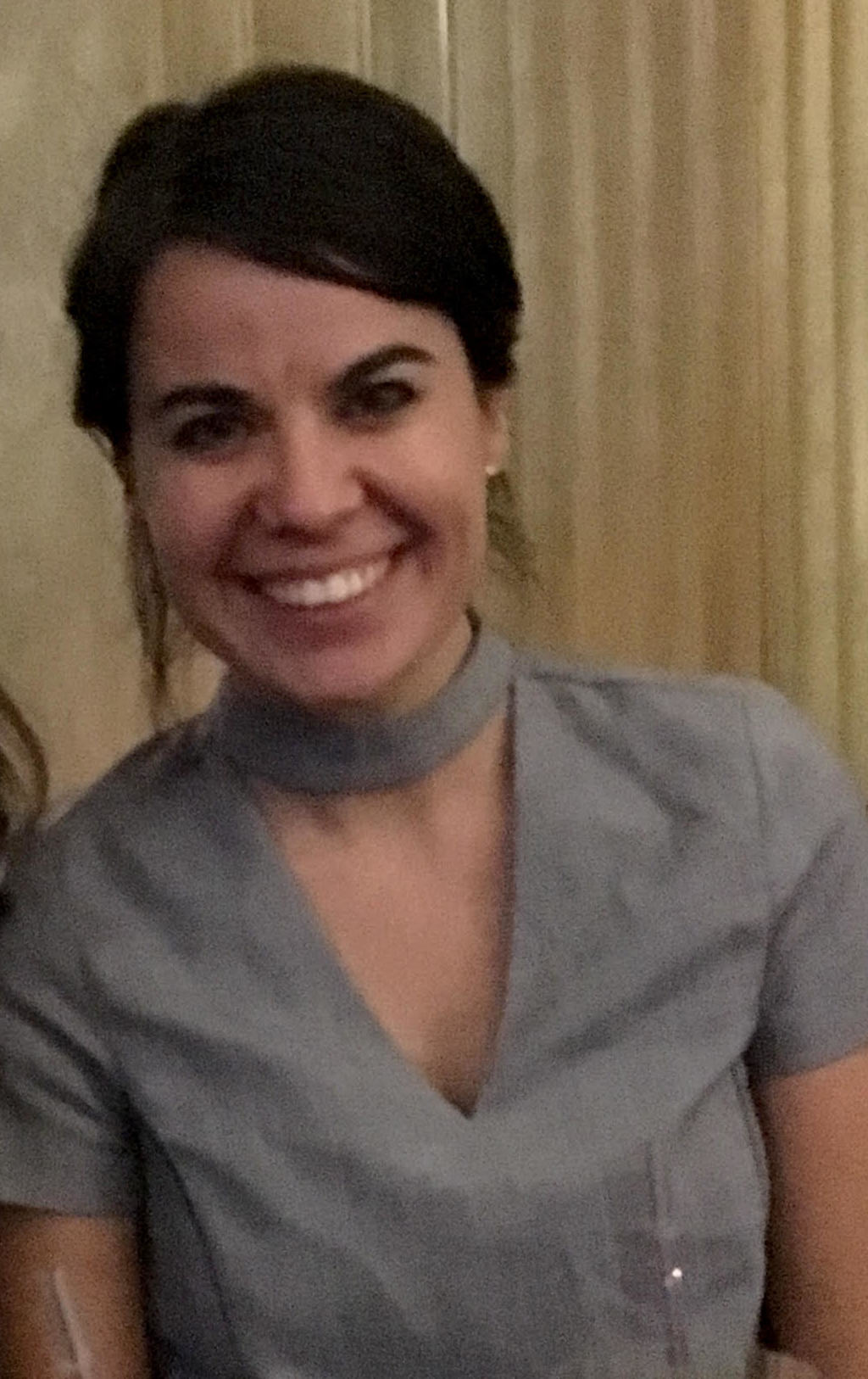
- Born: 1982 (age 43–44); São Paulo, Brazil
- Education: Universidad Nacional de Asunción
- Occupation: Architect
- Employer: Gabinete Arquitectura
- Partner: Solano Benítez
- Awards: Moira Gemmill Prize (2018)

Gloria Cabral (born 1982) is a Brazilian-Paraguayan architect and recipient of the Golden Lion at the Venice Biennale of Architecture and the Moira Gemmill Prize for Emerging Architecture. She was a partner at the Paraguayan firm Gabinete de Arquitectura.

== Early years ==
Gloria Cabral was born in São Paulo, Brazil in 1982. At age six she moved with her family to Asunción, Paraguay. She studied architecture at the Universidad Nacional de Asunción. Before finishing university, in 2003, she joined Gabinete de Arquitectura. At that time, one of the partners retired and Cabral, along with other interns, formed a group that became a partner of the studio.

== Career ==
Cabral was a member of Gabinete de Arquitectura between 2004 and 2023.

In 2014, Cabral was chosen by the Swiss architect Peter Zumthor as his disciple as part of the 2014-2015 Rolex Mentor and Protégé Arts Initiative. Her selection arose through a search made by the Swiss firm among young talents around the world. She was one of four finalists in the architecture category, and the only woman selected. That year, she traveled to Switzerland several times and worked with Zumthor on designing a tea house in South Korea.

== Awards and recognitions ==
She was responsible for the Teletón Children's Rehabilitation Center project that in 2010 won the first prize of the Pan American Biennial in the Rehabilitation and Recycling category.

In 2016, together with Gabinete de Arquitectura, she won the Golden Lion of the Venice Biennale of Architecture, for Best Participation in the International Exhibition. Two years later, she received the Moira Gemmill Prize for Emerging Architecture, one of the Women in Architecture Awards granted by the Architectural Review and the Architects' Journal.
