= Centro Financiero Confinanzas =

Unfinished skyscraper in Caracas, Venezuela

Coordinates: 10°30′19″N 66°53′56″W

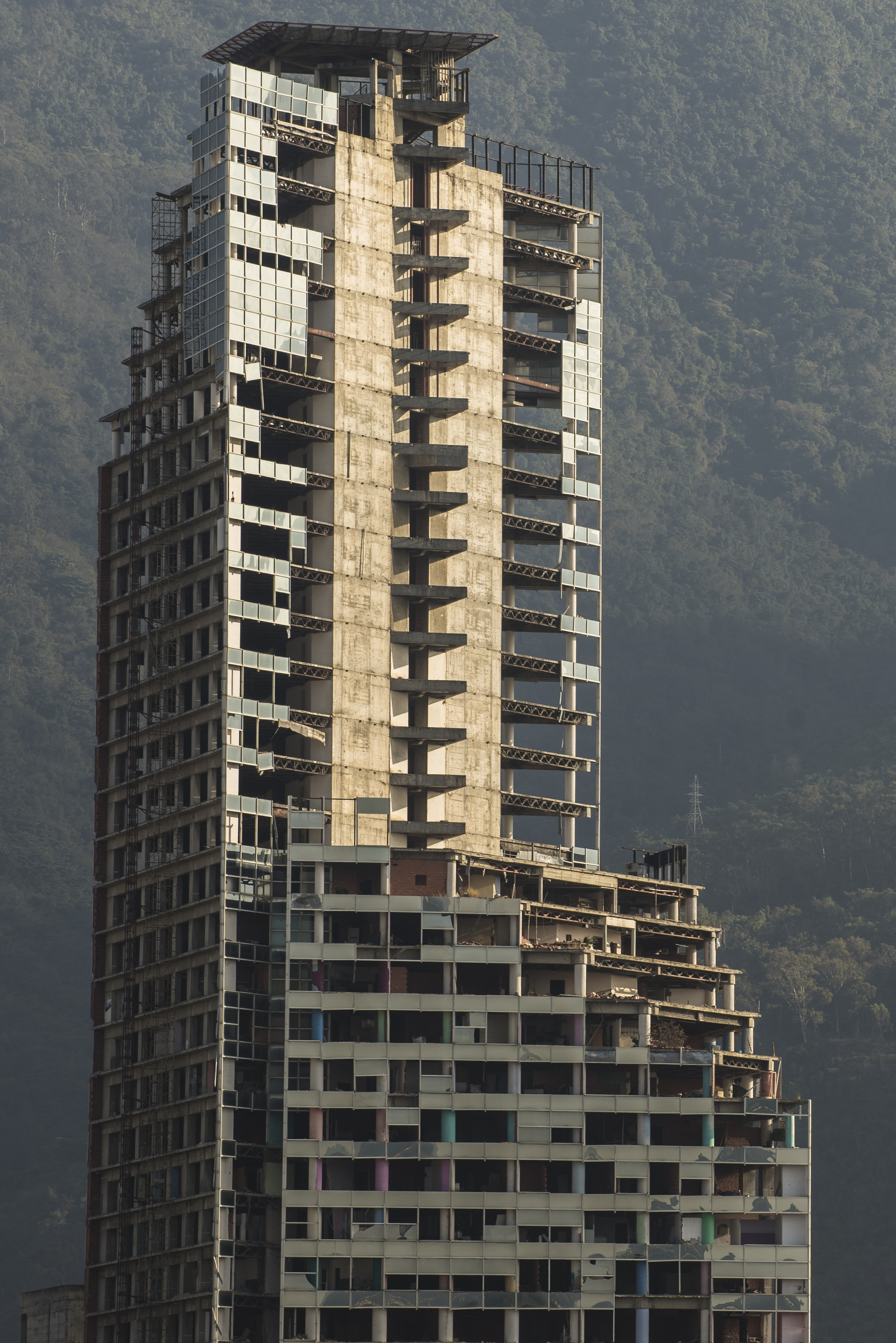
- Centro Financiero Confinanzas, incomplete in 2017

General information
- Status: Incomplete
- Type: Office; Hotel; Aparthotel
- Location: Caracas, Venezuela
- Construction started: 1990; 36 years ago
- Construction stopped: 1994; 32 years ago
- Estimated completion: unknown
- Owner: Corpolago C. A.

Height
- Roof: 171 m (561 ft)

Technical details
- Floor count: 45
- Floor area: 121,741 m^{2} (1,310,410 sq ft)

Design and construction
- Architects: Enrique Gómez and Associates.
- Developer: J. David Brillembourg.
- Structural engineer: Brewer and Brewer Engineers S.C.

Centro Financiero Confinanzas (English: Confinanzas Financial Center), also known as Torre de David (the Tower of David) is an unfinished abandoned skyscraper in Caracas, the capital of Venezuela. It is the third highest skyscraper in the country after the twin towers of Parque Central Complex. The construction of the tower began in 1990 but was halted in 1994 due to the Venezuelan banking crisis. As of 2025, the building remains incomplete. It was damaged due to two earthquakes on 21 and 22 August 2018 and further damaged due to the two earthquakes on 24 June 2026.

== History ==
=== Construction and banking crisis ===
This tower in downtown Caracas is nicknamed "Torre de David" after David Brillembourg, the tower's main investor who died from cancer in 1993. During the banking crisis of 1994, the government took control of the building and it has not been completed since. The building lacks elevators, installed electricity, running water, balcony railing, windows, and even walls in many places. The complex has six buildings: El Atrio (a lobby and conference room), Torre A that is 171m tall (equaling 45 stories) and includes a heliport, Torre B, Edificio K, Edificio Z, and 12 floors of parking.

In 2001, the Venezuelan government made an attempt to auction off the complex, but no one made an offer.

=== Residence by squatters ===
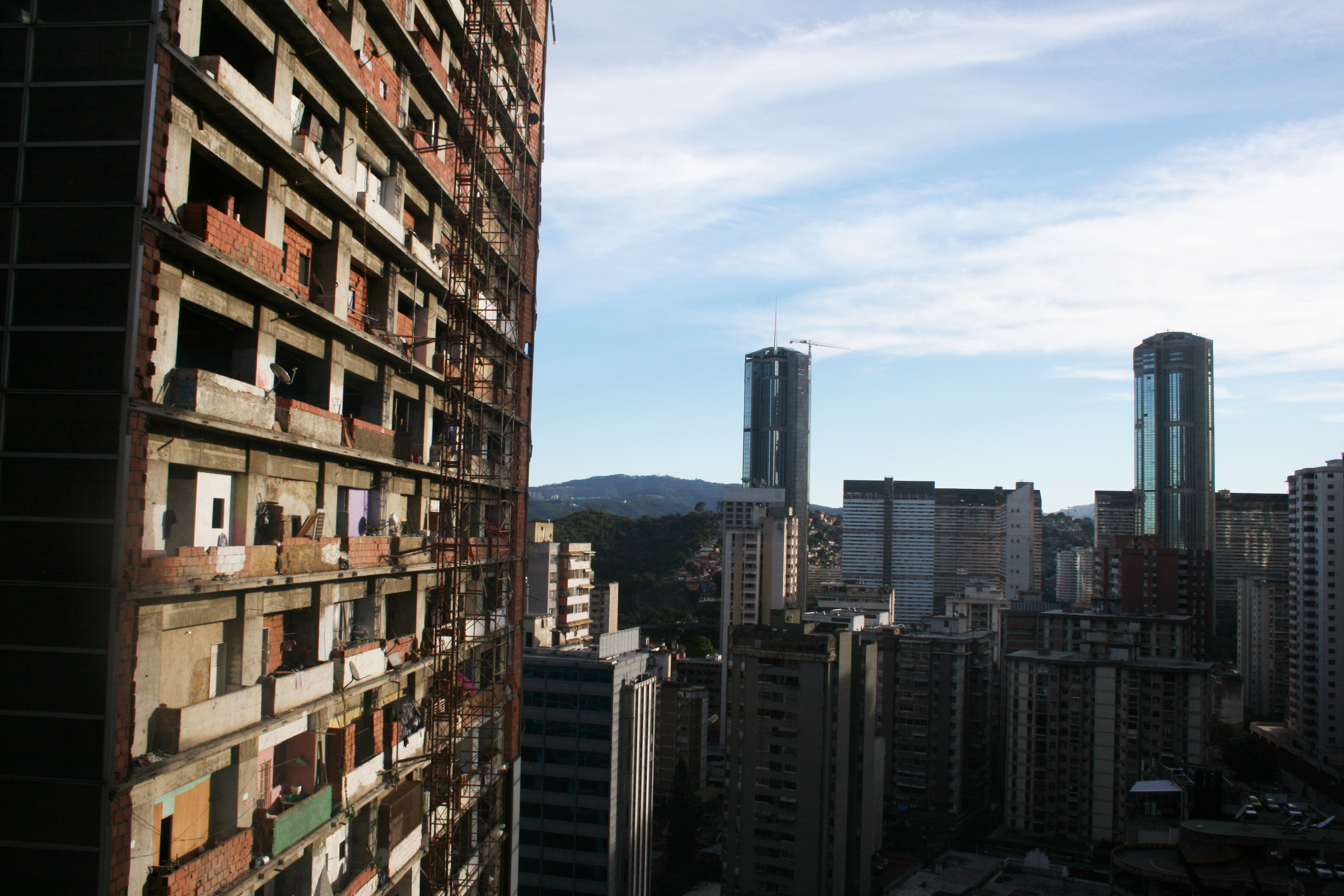
Exterior of Centro Financiero Confinanzas (Torre de David) in December 2013.

In the 2000s and 2010s, Caracas suffered from a housing shortage, with shortages amounting to about 400,000 Caracas homes in 2011. Construction of homes halted in Venezuela due to the fears of expropriations that occurred under the Bolivarian government while the government was also unable to build enough homes for Venezuelans. Citizens of Caracas soon began to occupy buildings surrounding the complex.

The housing shortage led to occupation of the complex by squatters led by ex-convicts in October 2007, with over 200 families, representing about 40% of Caracas's "informal communities", taking over the center. Residents improvised basic utility services, with water reaching all the way up to the 22nd floor. They could use motorcycles to travel up and down the first 10 floors, but had to use the stairs for the remaining levels. The residents lived up to the 28th floor, with many bodegas, barbershops, beauty salons, and even an unlicensed dentist also operating in the building. Some residents also had cars parked inside the building's parking garage.

The population grew to seven hundred families made of over 2,500 residents living in the tower by 2011 and had a peak population of 5,000 squatters.

=== Relocation ===
On 22 July 2014, the Venezuelan government launched so-called "Operation Zamora 2014" to evict hundreds of families from the tower and relocate them into new homes in Cúa, south of Caracas, as part of its Great Housing Mission project. By June 2015, all of the residents were relocated to their new homes. Some of the government-provided homes designated for relocated tower residents were already occupied by squatters who had taken over the government facilities.

=== Vacant (2014–present) ===
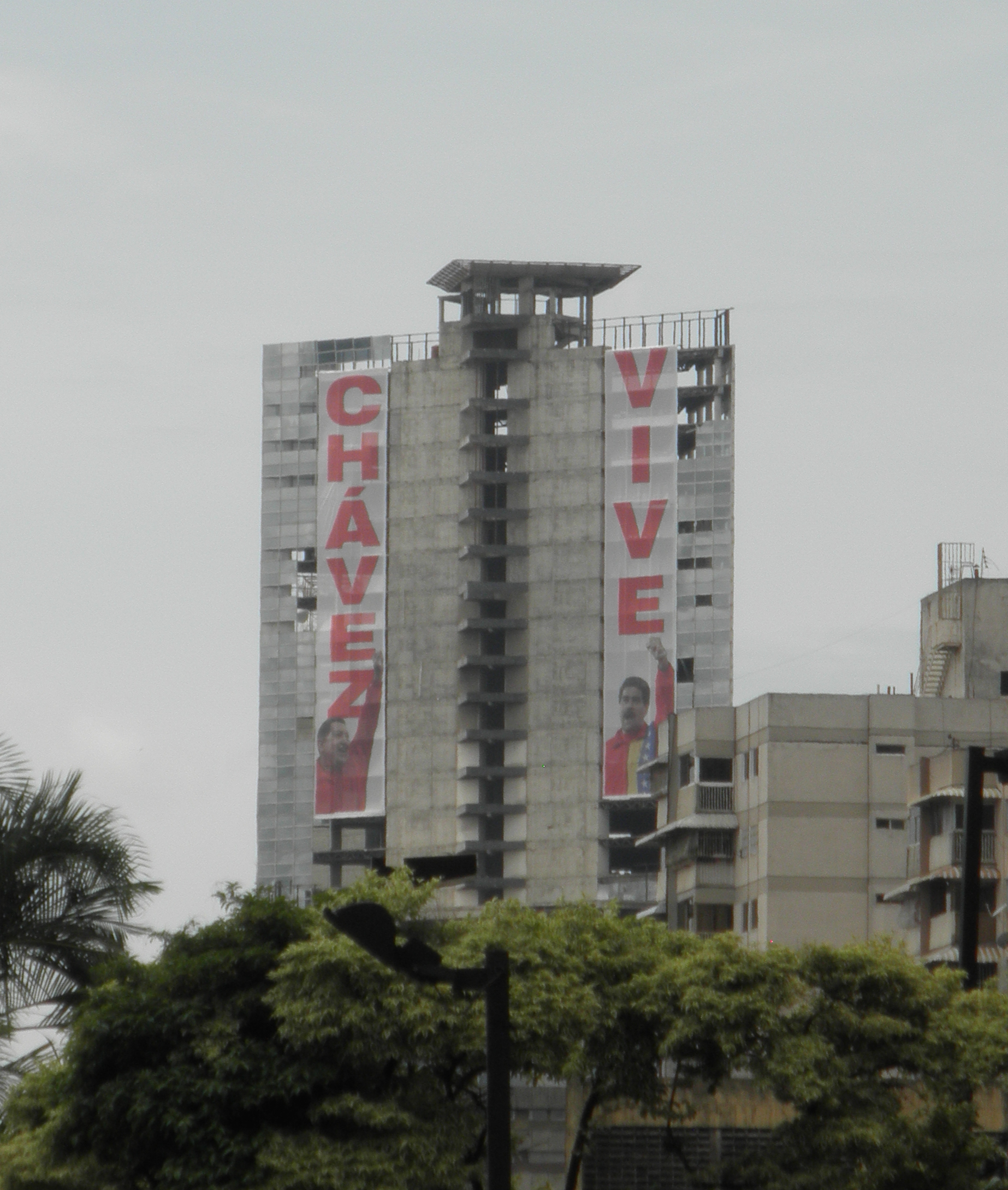
The tower in 2014 draped with Bolivarian propaganda banners saying "Chávez Lives"

The architects Hubert Klumpner and Alfredo Brillembourg, relative of the late David Brillembourg who was a main investor of the tower, founded Urban Think Tank, which seeks to bring international attention to developing "informal settlements". The group made a documentary on how to make potential improvements with the complex which won a Golden Lion at the 2012 Venice Architecture Biennale of the Venice Biennale.

After relocation had proceeded in July 2014, newspaper Tal Cual reported that Chinese banks were interested in buying the tower and renovating it for its original use. On July 23, 2014, President Nicolás Maduro announced that the government had not yet decided what to do with the building, but was considering at least three possible options: "Some are proposing its demolition. Others are proposing turning it into an economic, commercial or financial center. Some are proposing building homes there. ...We're going to open a debate." In April 2015, the head of the government of the Capital District, Ernesto Villegas, announced that the tower would be used temporarily as a center for emergency care. Villegas indicated that members of the National Guard, Fire Department, and officials from the Directorate of Civil Protection would be installed in the building to serve the public.

However, in April 2016, it was reported that the Chinese bank proposal fell through and that the tower was not in use. Since then, the tower has remained incomplete.

On 21 August 2018, the tower was significantly damaged by an earthquake which caused the partial collapse of the top five floors, resulting in the affected portion leaning outward by 25 degrees.

It was further damaged by the two earthquakes on 24 June 2026: "In downtown Caracas, concrete from the top floors of the unfinished Tower of David skyscraper fell to the sidewalk, forcing firefighters to close off traffic.".

== In popular culture ==
- Torre David, a documentary by Urban Think Tank, won a Golden Lion at the 2012 Venice Architecture Biennale.
- In 2013, the Torre de David was featured by Photographer Iwan Baan in a TED Talk presentation at TEDCity2.0 entitled "Ingenious homes in unexpected places"
- In 2013, the book Torre David: Informal Vertical Communities, a study of the tower, was released.
- "Tower of David", a 2013 episode of the US television drama Homeland, was set in the building (but filmed in Puerto Rico).
- In May 2014, the tower was featured in the BBC World News documentary, Our World.
- The novel Damnificados by JJ Amaworo Wilson (son of author David Henry Wilson), published by PM Press in 2016, is based on the occupation of the Tower of David.
- "Ruina" The feature documentary about internal life and organization of Torre David
- In 2015, the tower was featured in an Episode 2 of the Simon Reeve documentary "Caribbean", broadcast on the BBC.

== See also ==
- List of tallest buildings in Venezuela
- List of tallest buildings in South America
- Kowloon Walled City, a series of makeshift buildings populated in a similar manner
- Ponte City Apartments
- Ryugyong Hotel
