= Gabriela de Matos =

Brazilian architect

- Born: Minas Gerais
- Alma mater: Pontifical Catholic University of Minas Gerais; University of São Paulo
- Awards: Golden Lion for Best National Participation (2023)

Gabriela de Matos is a Brazilian architect. She analyzes the impacts of architecture and urban design on structural racism and sexism within the context of the African diaspora.

== Early life and education ==
Gabriela de Matos was born in Vale do Rio Doce, Minas Gerais. In 2010, she earned a bachelor's degree in Architecture and Urban Planning from the Pontifical Catholic University of Minas Gerais. She later specialized in Construction Management and Real Estate Assessment before completing a master's degree at the University of São Paulo.

== Career ==
In 2014, she founded her own architecture firm, Estúdio de Arquitetura – Gabriela de Matos. In 2018, she launched Projeto Arquitetas Negras (Black Female Architects Project), a catalog of Black Brazilian female architects. As part of this initiative, she wrote and published the project's namesake magazine, which won the IAB-SP award for Best Architecture Publication in 2019.

From 2020 to 2023, she was a professor of architecture and urbanism at São Paulo's Escola da Cidade. Between 2020 and 2022, she served as vice president of the São Paulo department of the Institute of Architects of Brazil (IAB-SP).

In 2022, the São Paulo Biennial Foundation announced De Matos and Paulo Tavares as curators of the Brazilian Pavilion for the 2023 Venice Biennale of Architecture. That same year, she was appointed as a juror for the 2022 Ibero-American Architecture Biennale.

In 2023, their pavilion, Terra, was awarded the Golden Lion for Best National Participation.

Her work "investigates structural racism and its implications in urban planning and architecture produced in the African diaspora in Brazil."

== Awards and honors ==
- 2019: IAB-SP award for Best Architecture Publication for Projeto Arquitetas Negras Vol. 1.
- 2020: IAB-RJ's Architect of the Year
- 2023: Golden Lion Award for Best National Participation at the Venice Biennale of Architecture (alongside Paulo Tavares).
