= Malkit Shoshan =

Israeli Dutch architect (born 1976)

- מלכית שושן
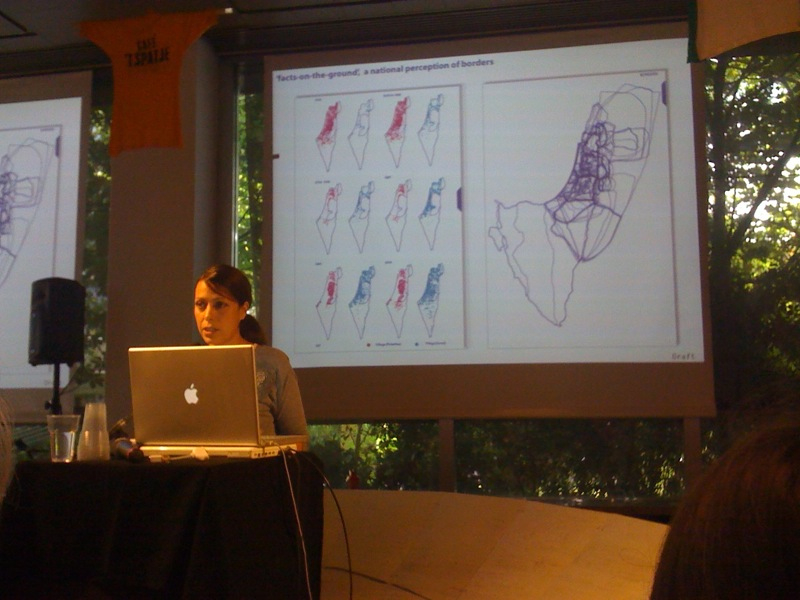
- Born: 1976 (age 49–50); Haifa, Israel
- Citizenship: Israeli, Dutch
- Education: Technion – Israel Institute of Technology
- Occupation: Designer
- Organization: Foundation for Achieving Seamless Territory (FAST)
- Notable work: BLUE, Atlas of the Conflict: Israel-Palestine, Village: One Land Two Systems and Platform Paradise, ZOO, Border Ecologies
- Website: seamlessterritory.org

Malkit Shoshan (Hebrew: מלכית שושן; born 1976) is a designer, author, teacher, and founder of «FAST: Foundation for Achieving Seamless Territory», an architectural think tank that addresses "the relationships between architecture, urban planning, and human rights."

In 2021 Shoshan won the Silver Lion at the Venice Biennale of Architecture.

== Career ==
Shoshan studied architecture at the Technion – Israel Institute of Technology and the Istituto Universitario di Architettura di Venezia in Italy.

Her interest in cross-disciplinary and multi-scalar work exploring the impact of urban planning and human rights in conflict and post-conflict areas started in 2005, when she founded FAST together with Michiel Schwarz, Willem Velthoven and Alwine van Heemstra. The initiative emerged in response to a request raised from a Palestinian community of internally displaced persons, Ein Hawd, which sought a planning alternative to one imposed by the Israeli government.

In 2015 she was a finalist for the Wheelwright Prize, a $100,000 traveling fellowship awarded by the Harvard Graduate School of Design. The following year, Shoshan was appointed curator of the Dutch pavilion at the Venice Architecture Biennale, where she presented the exhibition «BLUE: Architecture of UN Peacekeeping Missions».

In 2021 Shoshan received the Silver Lion at the Venice Biennale of Architecture for her collaborative project «Watermelons, Sardines, Crabs, Sands, and Sediments: Border Ecologies and the Gaza Strip».

From 2018 to 2023 she was Area Head of the Art, Design, and the Public Domain Master in Design Studies at Harvard GSD. As of 2025, she is a Senior Loeb Scholar and Design Critic in Urban Planning and Design at the same institution.

== Publications ==
- Atlas of Conflict: Israel-Palestine (2010)
- "Zoo, or the letter Z, just after Zionism (2012)
- Village. One Land Two Systems and Platform Paradise (2014, co-author)
- Drone. UNMANNED. Architecture and Security Series (2016, co-editor)
- Spaces of Conflict (2017, co-editor)
- UN Peace Missions in Urban Environments and the Legacy of UNMIL (2019).
- Retreat. UNMANNED. Architecture and Security Series (2020, co-editor)
- BLUE: Architecture of UN Peacekeeping Missions (2023)
