= Hubert Klumpner =

Austrian architect (born 1965)

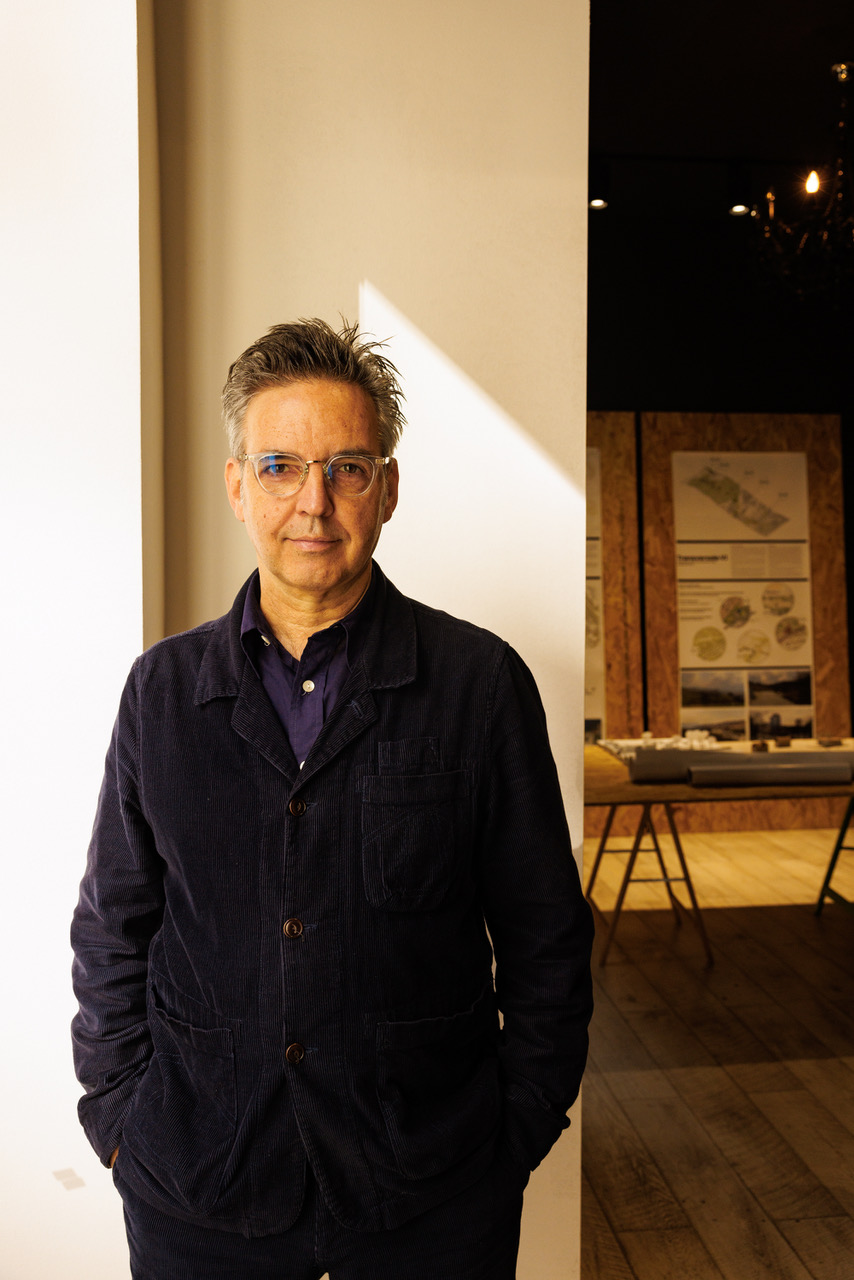
- Hubert Klumpner 2024, Photo: Peter Rigaud
- Born: 22 December 1965 (age 60); Salzburg, Austria
- Occupations: architect, professor

Hubert Klumpner (born 22 December 1965 in Salzburg) is an Austrian architect, urbanist, educator, researcher, curator and activist.

Klumpner is a tenured professor at the Swiss Federal Institute of Technology in Zurich (ETH Zurich), where he directs since 2010 the Chair of Architecture and Urban Design. He is the general director of the Center for Architecture, Society and Environment, ETH CASE (Wohnforum). In the Institute of Science Technology and Policy (ISTP) he directs a research group that explores how science, technology and policy are transforming urbanization processes.

Klumpner was associate professor of architecture and planning at the Graduate School of Architecture Planning and Preservation (GSAPP) at Columbia University, New York from 2007 to 2010.

Klumpner is also the founder and design principal, of the international, Swiss based architecture and planning studio, urbanthinktank_next (uttnext), established in 2019, with a partner office in Medellin (COL). As co-founder of Urban-Think Tank (U-TT), he is regarded as one of the originators of the “social turn”, a movement that had its breakthrough in 2010 in New York with the Museum of Modern Art (MoMA) exhibition "Small Scale, Big Change: New Architectures of Social Engagement”, curated by Andres Lepik. On the 2021 Vienna Biennale for Change under the directorship of Christoph Thun-Hohenstein, where Klumpner curated Architecture and Urban Design, the Forbes Magazine wrote: "The exhibition may therefore ultimately be most productive as a clearinghouse for evaluating which tools – practical and metaphorical – will be needed to change the planetary mindset."

== Life ==
=== Early life: 1965-1998 ===
Hubert Klumpner was born 22 Dec.1965 in Salzburg, Austria where his family moved shortly before his birth, as the third child of Karl-Heinz Klumpner, a customs officer, and Lydia Klumpner (born Bayer) from Germany. Klumpner's parental grandparents are from a Moravian-Silesian family of architects, builders, and mining entrepreneurs (Karl Klumpner, Moritz Klumpner, Emanuel Klumpner, Leopold Klumpner) from Fulnek (CZE), where they lived for generations before the flight and expulsion after WWII.

Hubert Klumpner grew up between Salzburg and the 350-year-old country house of his maternal grandparents in the Bavarian Alps across the border without a paved road, telephone, flushing toilette, or warm water.

After graduating from a technical high school (HTL), where he passed an apprenticeship as a carpenter, bricklayer, and draftsman with distinctions, he moved to Vienna in 1987 to apply to the academy of art at the Masterclass of Pritzker Prize-winning Arch. Hans Hollein. In February 1993, Klumpner earned his master's degree in architecture from the Academy of Applied Arts in Vienna and made internships with Enrique Miralles and Carmen Pinós in Barcelona or a self-initiated exhibition and -film project, John Lautner, Architect, Los Angeles.

Later in 1995, he received a Fulbright Fellowship to study at GSAPP at Columbia University / NY, a postgraduate degree as Master of Science in Architecture and Urban-Design (MSAUD), winning the Award for Excellence in Design. After extensive traveling in the Americas, he decided to stay in South America until the 2010 call to join ETH Zurich in Switzerland.

=== Mid-career: 1998-2019 ===
Klumpner founded together with Alfredo Brillembourg the garage project Caracas-Think Tank (U-TT) in 1998. U-TT is a group of architects who are actively engaged in working with the other 90% of people affected by urbanization processes. From the perspective of the global south, resilience, risk, in post-apartheid, post-crisis, or post-conflict conditions.

They first came to public attention at the 4th International Architecture Symposium, ARCHISYMP in Pontresina, Switzerland, only the day before the 9/11 terrorist attacks on the World Trade Center. Engaging in direct discourse with Winy Maas, Saskia Sassen, and Sergio Benvenuto moderated by Kristin Feireiss at the peak of the star-architecture cult, their talk was titled, "The Cities Poor Belt: dialectics of poverty and nobility," in what architecture theorist and historian Bart Lootsma, present in the auditorium, remembers as follows: "But when architects like Thom Mayne, Wolf Prix, and Hani Rashid could not fly in on September 11th because of the grounding of all flights, you two presented us a radically alternative program for architecture, based on inclusivity, not exclusivity, and collaboration instead of individualism." In 2002 the collaboration resulted in the NGO Caracas Urban-Think Tank.

In 2011 Urban-Think Tank Architects LLC was opened in Zurich and blended from 2011 until 2019 with the University Research and Teaching. In 2019, after Klumpner ended the partnership with Alfredo Brillembourg, Klumpner re-founded Urban-Think Tank, Hubert Klumpner Architects LLC, under the label of Urban-Think Tank Next (uttnext).

== Teaching and research ==
Klumpner has a lifelong engagement with learning and teaching architecture. Appointments starting out directly after his graduation in February 1993 as the assistant in the Masterclass to Hans Hollein at the Academy of Applied Arts Vienna.In the Methods course with Luis Fornéz he introduced Digital Technologies at the Architecture Department of the Universidad Central de Venezuela Caracas. Short time teaching activities and lecturing led him to Harvard GSD, SCI-Arc, Taliesin, RIBA, A-A London, Delft University of Technology, Berlage, HKU, AEDES, HafenCity University Hamburg, Technical University of Munich, TU Wien, amongst others.

- since 2010 Swiss Federal Institute of Technology, ETH Zurich, Professor of Architecture and Urban Design
- 2020 Technical University Vienna, TU Vienna, Visiting Professor
- 2007-2010 Columbia University NYC, GSAPP, Assistant Professor
- 2004-2007 Universidad Central de Venezuela, UCV Caracas, School of Architecture, Adjunct Professor
- 2003 Universidad Simon Bolivar, USB Caracas, School of Architecture, Visiting Professor
- 2001-2002 Salzburg International Summer Academy of Fine Arts, Assistant Professor
- 1993-1994 Academy of Applied Arts, Vienna, Assistant, Masterclass of Prof. Hans Hollein

== Selected projects ==
Current

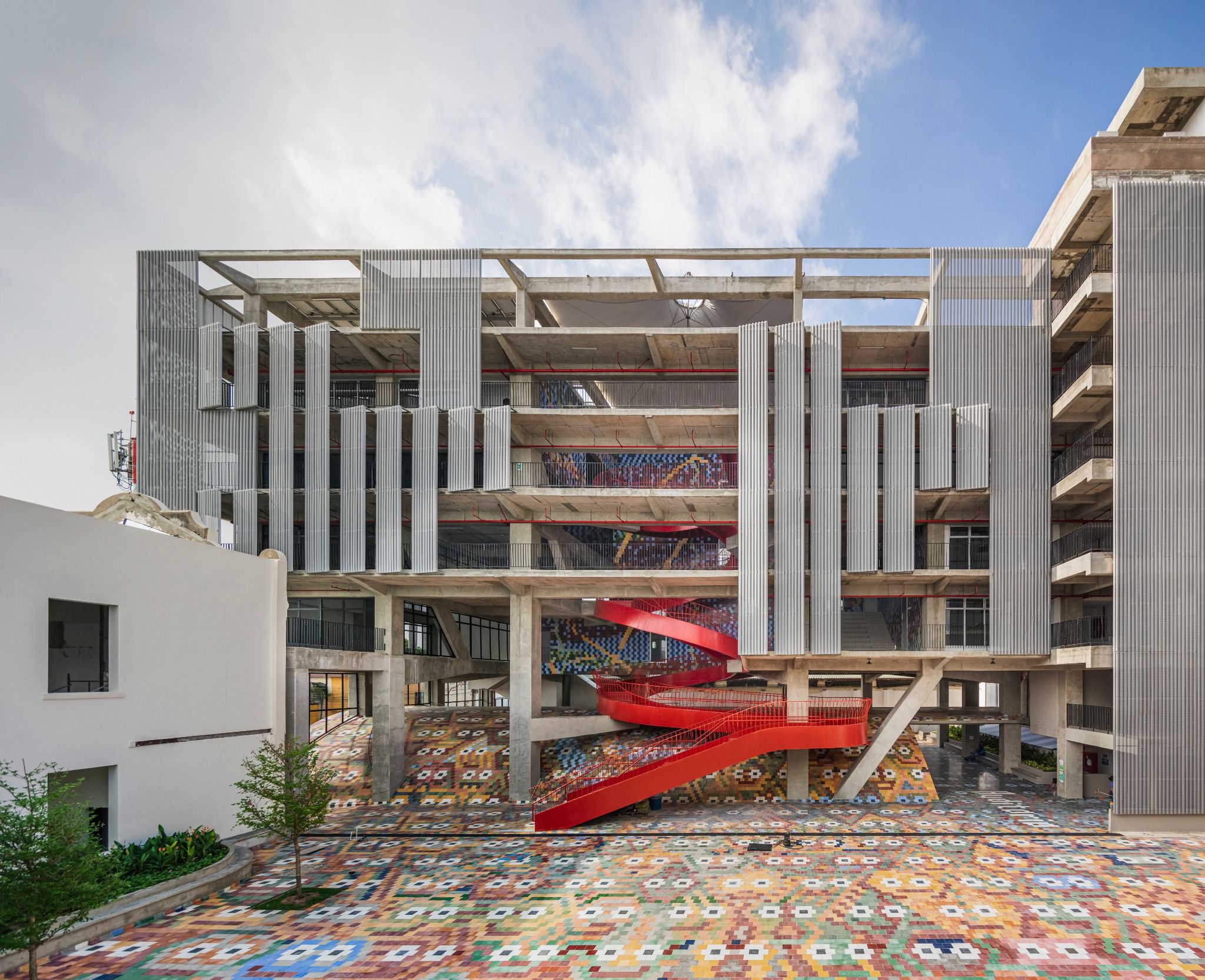
Fábrica de Cultura, Barranquilla, Colombia

- ONDA, Multifunctional Green Corridor Building, Medellin, Colombia
- Centro Cultural Villas de San Pablo, Barranquilla, Colombia
- General Urban Plan, Sarajevo, Bosnia and Herzegovina

Completed

- 2024 Megacolegio, Cartagena, Colombia
- 2022 Fábrica de Cultura, Barranquilla, Colombia
- 2021 Think tank station, Mobile installation
- 2019 Empower Shack Phase 1, Cape Town, South Africa
- 2019 Rural-Think Tank, Growing House, Eichham, Germany
- 2017 Playground, Barcelona, Spain
- 2014 Music School, Paraisopolis, São Paulo, Brasil
- 2012 Torre David, Caracas, Venezuela
- 2010 FAVA, School for Autistic Children, Caracas, Venezuela
- 2010 Metro-Cable, Av. Lecúna, Caracas, Venezuela
- 2005 St. Mary's, Anglican Cathedral and Parish house, Caracas, Venezuela
- 2003 Vertical Gym, Prototype Chacao, Santa Cruz, Caracas, Venezuela

== Selected publications ==
- Informal City: Caracas Case, Prestel, Munich, 2005, ISBN 978-3-7913-3391-5
- SlumLab Magazine Nr. 1–10, Self-published, 2007-19
- Torre David: Informal Vertical Communities, Lars Müller, Zurich, 2013, ISBN 3-03778-298-6
- Re-Living the City, UABB Shenzhen Biennale for Urbanism, Actar, New York, 2016, ISBN 978-1-9451-5003-6
- Reactivate Athens, 101 Ideas, Ruby Press, Berlin, 2017, ISBN 978-3-944074-16-0
- Urban-Think Tank, The Architect and the City, Hatje-Cantz, Berlin, 2021, ISBN 978-3-7757-4286-3
- SDG-Volume 11: Sustainable Cities and neighborhoods, MDPI Books, Basel, 2021-22, ISBN 978-3-03897-871-8

== Selected awards ==
- 2024 Mies Crown Hall Americas Prize / MCHAP (5th Cycle), Nomination, withdrawn by Author
- 2020 Rethinking the Future Awards Awardee
- 2018 RIBA International Prize Longlist for World's Best Building
- 2018 UN-Habitat Dubai International Award for Best Practices
- 2017 Curry Stone Foundation Design Prize
- 2012 Golden Lion, Best Project at the Venice Biennale of Architecture
- 2012 Silver Holcim Award, Global
- 2011 Gold Holcim Award, Latin America
- 2010 Ralph Erskine Award, Royal Swedish Architects, Stockholm, together with Alfredo Brillembourg
- 1994 National Olympic Committee Best Project Award, Rome
- 1993 Rudolph Schindler Award, Los Angeles, together with Johannes Kraus
- 1993 City of Vienna Architecture Award, Best Architect under 30, Vienna

== Selected curatorship ==
- 2023 15th Days of Architecture Sarajevo, together with Michael Walczak
- 2022 UABB Shenzhen Biennale
- 2021 Vienna Biennale for Change under the directorship of Christoph Thun-Hohenstein
- 2015 UABB Shenzhen Biennale
- 2014 Venice Biennale of Architecture, SÍ / NO: The Architecture of Urban-Think Tank
- 2012 Venice Biennale of Architecture, Torre David
- 2008 Utrecht Biennale for Social Design
- 2007 Rotterdam Biennale
- 2005 São Paulo Biennale, Representing Venezuela
