= Minsuk Cho =

South Korean architect

- 조민석
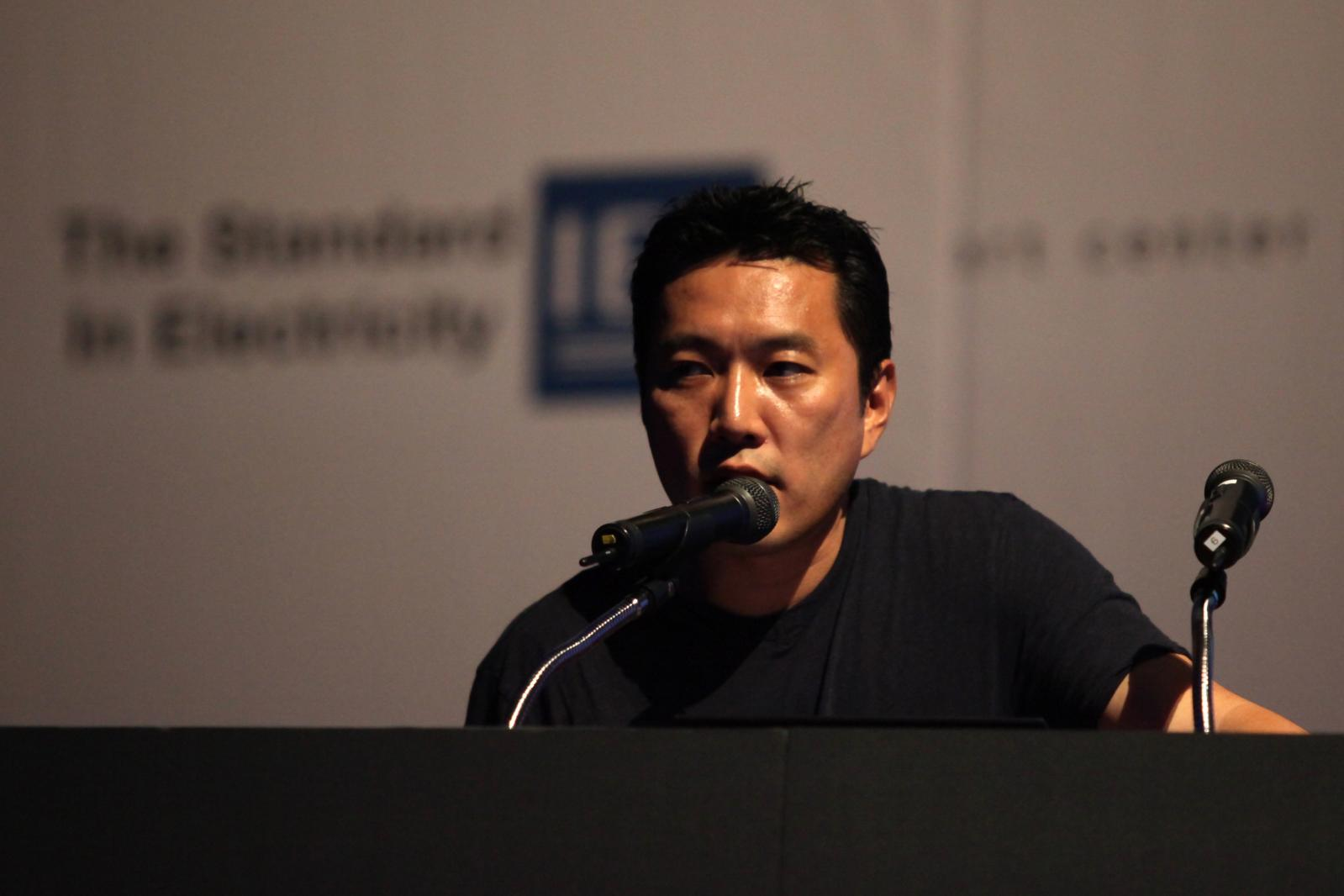
- Cho in 2009
- Born: 1966 (age 59–60); Seoul, South Korea
- Education: Kyungbock High School; Yonsei University; Columbia University
- Occupation: Architect
- Practice: Mass Studies

Minsuk Cho (Korean: 조민석; born 1966) is a South Korean architect.

== Early life and education ==
Minsuk Cho was born in Seoul and graduated from the Architectural Engineering Department of Yonsei University (Seoul, Korea) and the Graduate School of Architecture at Columbia University (New York, USA).

== Career ==
Minsuk Cho began his professional career working for Kolatan/MacDonald Studio, and Polshek and Partners in New York, and later moved to the Netherlands to work for OMA. Through these jobs, he gained experience in a wide range of architectural and urban projects implemented in various locations. With partner James Slade, he established Cho Slade Architecture in 1998 in New York City to be engaged in various projects both in the U.S. and Korea. In 2003, he came back to Korea to open his own firm, Mass Studies.

His representative works include "Pixel House", "Dalki Theme Park", "Nature Poem", "Boutique Monaco", "Seoul Commune 2026", "S-Trenue", "Ann Demeulemeester Shop", "Ring Dome", "Xi Gallery", "World Expo 2010 Shanghai: Korea Pavilion" and "Daum Space.1".

== Recognition ==
Minsuk Cho has received many awards, including first prize in the 1994 Shinkenchiku International Residential Architecture Competition, the Architectural League of New York's "Young Architects Award" in 2000 for his work at Cho Slade Architecture, and two U.S. Progressive Architecture Awards (Citations) in 1999 and 2003. Boutique Monaco was named a finalist for the International Highrise Award (DAM) in 2008 and nominated again for S-trenue in 2010. Recently, the Korea Pavilion was awarded the Silver Medal by the B.I.E. in the category of Architectural Design for the World Expo 2010 Shanghai, as well as a Presidential Citation from Korea. His work was exhibited at La Biennale di Venezia for Dalki Theme Park in 2004, and for Different but Same Houses in 2010. He was also a part of the Open House travelling exhibition from 2006 to 2008, the New Trends of Architecture in Europe and Asia Pacific 2006–2007 traveling exhibit, and has been an active lecturer and participant in symposiums worldwide.

In 2014, Minsuk Cho received a Golden Lion award for Best National Participation in the 14th International Architecture Exhibition of la Biennale di Venezia.
