= 2006 Venezuelan presidential election =

- 3 December 2006
- Registered: 15,921,223
- Turnout: 74.69% (▲18.06pp)
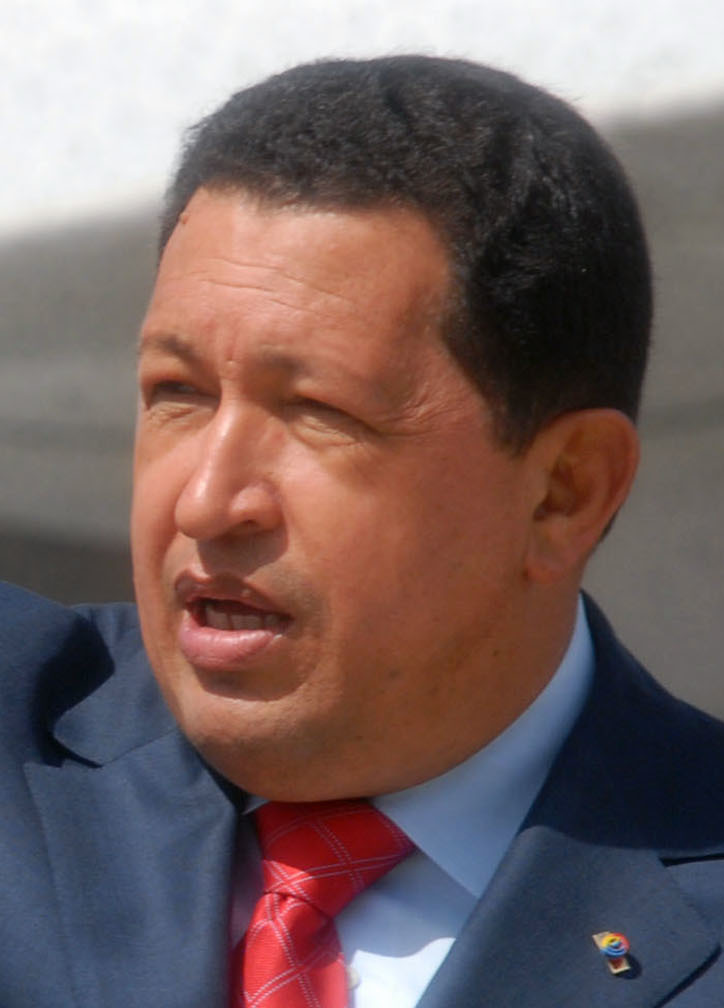

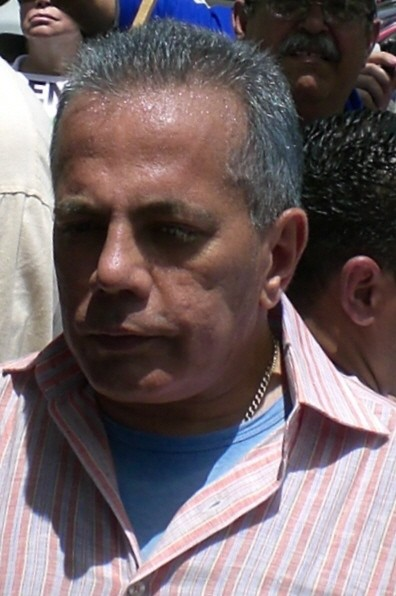
Nominee	Hugo Chávez	Manuel Rosales
Party	Fifth Republic	A New Era
Popular vote	7,309,080	4,292,466
Percentage	62.85%	36.91%
- Results by state. Darker shades indicate higher percentage.

Results by municipality
Hugo Chávez
40–49%
50–59%
60-69%
70-79%
80-89%
90-99%
Manuel Rosales
50–59%
60-69%
70-79%
President before election
Hugo Chávez
MVR
Elected President
Hugo Chávez
MVR

Presidential elections were held in Venezuela on 3 December 2006 to elect a president for a six-year term to begin on 10 January 2007. The contest was primarily between incumbent President Hugo Chávez, and Zulia Governor Manuel Rosales of the opposition party A New Era.

After winning a recall referendum in 2004, President Chávez positioned himself for re-election in 2006 for a second full term. The opposition did not hold a primary, instead, the candidates reached a consensus into backing the governor of the largest state (Zulia), Manuel Rosales. Chávez benefited from a high popularity, and led most opinion polls throughout the campaign. He went to win re-election by the widest margin by percentage of the popular vote since the 1947 elections, and by the largest margin of votes cast in the history of Venezuela.

== Candidates ==
There were fourteen candidates in total, making the ballot the largest in Venezuelan history. According to El Universal, this was caused by division among adherents to grassroots Chavismo.

- Hugo Chávez, incumbent president, representing the Fifth Republic Movement
- Manuel Rosales, governor of Zulia State, representing A New Era
- Pedro Aranguren of Movimiento Conciencia de País
- Carolina Contreras, independent
- Venezuela Portuguesa Da Silva Isquierdo of Nuevo Orden Social
- Ángel Irigoyen, of Let Us Break Chains (RC)
- Isbelia León, of the Strength and Peace Institution
- Luis Alfonso Reyes Castillo of Organización Juventud Organizada de Venezuela (Joven)
- Homer Rodríguez, of For Love of Venezuela
- Carmelo Romano Pérez, Liberal United People Movement
- Yudith Salazar of Hijos de la Patria
- Alejandro José Suárez Luzardo of the Partido Sentir Nacional
- José Tineo, Venezuelan Third Millennium National Party
- Eudes Vera Tovar, independent

=== Withdrawn candidates ===
- Jesús Caldera Infante the former president of FOGADE, representing the New Progressive Alliance. On 29 November, he withdrew his candidacy and backed Rosales.
- Benjamín Rausseo a stand-up comedian, endorsed by the newly formed "PIEDRA" party. Three weeks before the election, in accordance with a campaign pledge he had made earlier (to stand down if not placed first or second in the opinion polls), he withdrew his candidacy without endorsing either Chávez or Rosales, telling his supporters to vote for either.

=== Primary election ===
Opposition leaders debated on how they could choose a single candidate. Julio Borges, of Justice First, proposed holding primary elections for August 2006. Civil society organization Súmate recommended procedures for a primary, to be held on 13 August 2006, to choose the opposition candidate for the December 2006 presidential elections. Among the candidates were: Manuel Rosales (A New Era), Teodoro Petkoff (independent), Sergio Omar Calderón (Copei), Wiliam Ojeda (Un Solo Pueblo), Cecilia Sosa (Federal Republican Party), Enrique Tejera París (independent) and Vicente Brito (Republican Movement). Nine other candidates agreed to the terms for holding a primary, confirming their desire to allow the citizens to choose the opposition candidate.

The main candidates, Julio Borges and Teodoro Petkoff, agreed to withdraw from the pre-candidacy to endorse Manuel Rosales, based on his opinion polling support. More than thirty political and civil organizations publicly expressed their support to Rosales. The trade union bureau of Democratic Actions, as well as its regional components and many party leaders, announced that they would support the single opposition candidate in the December elections. On 9 August, Súmate announced that the 13 August primary election would not be held, since the candidates had decided to back Manuel Rosales as the single opposition candidate. María Corina Machado said that the primary "initiative accomplished its goal and that Súmate would continue working to ensure clean elections and respect for citizens' rights".

== Campaign ==
"Red Tide takes Caracas": Pro-Chávez march on multiple avenues

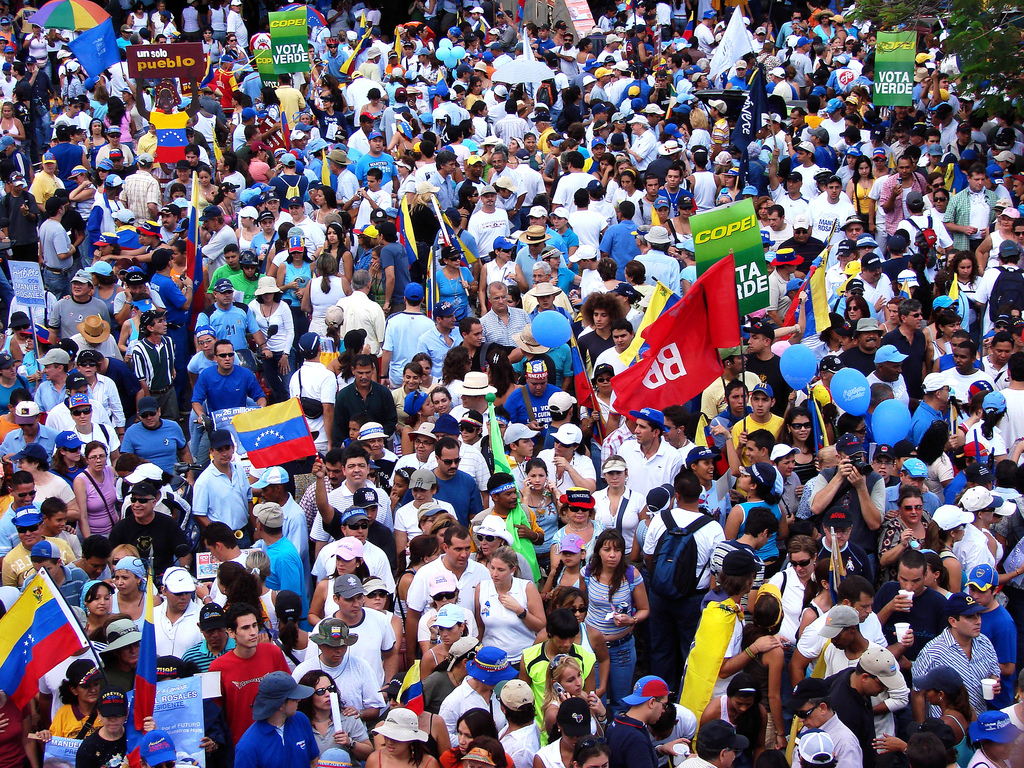
Rally in support of Rosales

=== Chávez ===
Chávez's campaign manager Rafael Lacava said that the campaign was to be based on defending Venezuela's national sovereignty and promoting world peace. According to Unión Radio, Lacava added that a campaign theme was to be the "country's freedom to no longer be a North American colony". According to the Associated Press, Chávez launched his campaign "with warnings that Washington is trying to undermine December's presidential vote and destabilize Venezuela", saying "I am the candidate of the revolution and without a doubt I am the candidate of the national majority", dismissing other candidates as "tools of the U.S. government". El Universal reports that Chávez said, "In this electoral process there are two candidates only, namely Hugo Chávez and George W. Bush".

Chávez promised that if elected he would personally convoke a midterm recall referendum in the year 2010 without the need for petition signatures as was the case with the 2004 recall referendum, and that he won that recall referendum, he would then call for a referendum to ask the people for indefinite re-election to be put into the constitution. On 26 November Chávez made his final rally in Caracas. Reuters estimated that hundreds of thousands participated. Chávez supporters packed several streets.

=== Rosales ===
Rosales said that the backbone of his government program was to be the social arena, saying it will be a "sound and well defined" program, including a "fair allocation of oil revenues by means of two axes– minimum wage for all unemployed and direct contribution to the underprivileged". The latter being promoted as Mi Negra which is a debit card handed out to the poor with monthly deposits from 20% of oil industry profits. Nevertheless, a poll shows 59% of the Venezuelan people rejected the Mi Negra program, preferring stable jobs. According to the Los Angeles Times, Rosales stated that Chávez was vulnerable on his "massive foreign aid programs, government-approved takeovers of land and buildings, and the perception that crime is increasing". Rosales said, "We will distribute land to the peasants, but we will buy it in such a way as to respect the principle of private property, just as we will respect those of human rights and social justice". Rosales would halt oil giveaways, "including sales of discounted oil to Cuba, until Venezuela reduced its high poverty rate".

The Associated Press reports that Rosales accuses Chávez of "overspending on a military buildup" and pledged "to use Venezuela's oil wealth to help the poor and improve education and health care", ridiculing Chávez's "claims of a possible war with the U.S." and saying, "Venezuela's real war should be against rampant street crime". Rosales held several large rallies around the country; the largest being "Las Avalanchas" in Caracas. Rallies were held in several states to try to get the Rosales campaign to be heard by as many people as possible. To close his election campaign, Manuel Rosales held a huge final rally in Caracas with an estimate by the Associated Press to be in the hundreds of thousands.

=== No debate held ===
Rosales demanded a public debate, saying Chávez should choose the TV channel where the debate would be broadcast. He also said "I am waiting for him (Chávez) to have a debate with me broadcast by all the TV channels to allow Venezuelans to know what is the project and the vision of the country he has and the project and vision we have". Chávez declared he would not debate Rosales because "the candidates from the opposition do not even have the condition to debate a schoolboy or girl in sixth grade from a Bolivarian school".

=== Slogans and ads ===
==== Chávez ====
Chávez launched his campaign with a slogan of 10 Millones de votos (10 million votes), On multiple occasions the campaign used the more combative "10 millones por el buche" (10 million votes down their throats). On 17 August 2006, while leading the oath at the national campaign headquarters (Commando Miranda), Chávez acknowledged that 10 million votes would be hard to attain.

From 9 October, Chávez campaign used the slogans por amor (for love) and Chávez, victoria de Venezuela (Chávez, Venezuela's victory). They also used the slogan uh, ah, Chávez no se va (ooh, oh, Chávez won't go) from the 2004 recall referendum campaign. A poll conducted by Cifras Escenarios reported that 76.7% of Venezuelans liked the love message. The English translation of the message is as follows:

Always, I have done everything out of love.
For the love of trees and rivers, I became a painter.
For the love of knowledge, studies, I left my dearest village, to study.
For the love of sports I became a ball player.
For the love of the motherland I became a soldier.
For the love of the people I became President, you made me President.
I have ruled these years out of love.
For love we did Barrio Adentro.
For love we did Mission Robinson.
For love we did Mercal.
We have done everything for love.
There is a lot left to do. I need more time.
I NEED YOUR VOTE. YOUR VOTE FOR LOVE.

==== Rosales ====
Atrévete con Manuel Rosales is the Rosales campaign slogan.

¡Ni el imperio, ni el barbudo! (Neither the [U.S.] empire, nor the [Cuban] bearded one!) is a slogan used by Rosales in launching his campaign, intended to "hit Chávez where the Venezuelan comandante is most vulnerable: his penchant for giving away billions of dollars to foreign countries, while nearly half of the Venezuelan people live in poverty" referring to subsidized oil deals to both Cuba and the United States. "We are not going to be the empire's defenders," Rosales said. "The empire must respect our sovereignty, and we must respect the empire," and "we cannot be looking at societies like Cuba as a model to be copied. We want modernity, transformation, development."

=== Endorsements ===
==== Chávez ====
- Action Force of Base Coordination (FACOBA)
- Action Networks of Community Change (REDES)
- Active Democracy National Organization (ONDA)
- Communitary Patriotic Unity (UPC)
- Emergent People (GE)
- Everybody Wins Independent Movement (MIGATO)
- Fifth Republic Movement (MVR)
- Independents for the National Community (IPCN)
- Laboral Power (PL)
- Militants Civic Movement (MCM)
- Movement for Direct Democracy (MDD)
- National Independent Movement (MNI)
- National Socialist Group of Liberation Pro Venezuela (PROVEN)
- New People Concentration Movement (MCGN)
- Tupamaro
- Revolutionary Middle Class (CMR)
- Union Party
- Venezuelan Revolutionary Currents (CRV)

==== Rosales ====
- A New Era
- Acción Agropecuaria
- Fearless People's Alliance (ABP)
- Apertura
- Araguaney Movimiento Popular
- National Convergence
- COPEI
- Democracia Renovadora
- Encuentro Nacional
- Fuerza Liberal
- Fuerza Popular
- Izquierda Democrática
- Justice First (PJ)
- Movement for Socialism (MAS)
- Movimiento Republicano
- Movimiento Laborista
- Partido Popular Independiente
- Pensamiento Nacional
- PIEDRA
- Polo Democrático
- Radical Cause
- Red Flag Party
- Solidaridad
- Solidaridad Independiente
- Unión Republicana Democrática
- Un Solo Pueblo
- Venezuela de Primera
- Venezuela Somos Todos

=== Calls for abstention ===
- Democratic Action

== Opinion polls ==
Polling company	Date published	Hugo Chávez (%)	Manuel Rosales (%)
Evans/McDonough	29 November 2006	57	38
Fundación CEPS / Veneopsa ++	24 November 2006	59.7	39.6
Zogby International	24 November 2006	60	31
Associated Press-Ipsos	23 November 2006	59	27
Instituto Venezolano de Análisis de Datos	23 November 2006	54.6	27.5
Observatorio Hannah Arendt*	18 November 2006	51	49
Penn, Schoen & Berland	15 November 2006	48	42
Datanálisis	15 November 2006	52.5	25.5
Centro de Estudios Políticos y Sociales	15 November 2006	58	40
Consultores XXI	15 November 2006	58.8	40
Hinterlaces	9 November 2006	45	27
Evans/McDonough	7 November 2006	57	35
Instituto Venezolano de Análisis de Datos	1 November 2006	53.2	28.1
Keller y Asociados+	2 November 2006	52	48
Escenarios	1 November 2006	63.3	26
Ceca	23 October 2006	39.5	41.3
Zogby International	23 October 2006	59	24
Instituto Venezolano de Análisis de Datos	12 October 2006	51.5	22.7
Penn, Schoen & Berland	16 September 2006	50	37
Datanálisis	13 September 2006	58.2	17.4
People's Daily +++	25 August 2006	58.9	19.3
Miami Herald +++	20 August 2006	35	25

(*) Technical tie

(+) Results are political segmentation, not voter intention

(++) This poll was attributed to the Universidad Complutense de Madrid. University's authorities clarified that they have not knowledge about this study. One of members of the CEPS happen to be a university faculty.

(+++) Publisher does not mention polling company.

=== International markets ===
International markets largely saw a Chávez victory. Rafael de la Fuente of BNP Paribas stated "The market expects a Chávez victory, they don't even question it". Ricardo Amorim of WestLB Research "The vision I see is that of a 20-point victory... We would be surprised if he does not win". Patrick Esteruelas of Eurasia Group saw Chávez winning by 60 percent. Also arguing that a high turnout would benefit Chávez, Goldman Sachs dismissed the close polling arguing, "Chávez is the favorite to win the election due to vast control of logistical and financial state resources, and influence over key institutions".

== Conduct ==
Four organisations were given permission to send official election observers to monitor the elections: Carter Center, European Union, Mercosur and Organization of American States. A fifth organisation was refused permission: Cortes Generales (Spanish parliament).

Polling stations opened at 6:00 a.m. but newspaper El Universal reported that in some electoral centers, voters waited in line since 3:00 a.m. According to the National Electoral Council (CNE) director Humberto Castillo, the turnout in polling stations was massive, and the conditions were "normal" throughout the country. Polling station were scheduled to close at 4:00 p.m. Around 5 p.m., CNE president Tibisay Lucena officially announced the end of the voting process, but gave orders to keep polling stations open if voters still remained in line.

Rosales' campaign team denounced irregularities in the closing of some voting booths, saying that Plan República—the armed forces sent to guard the electoral process—would not let some electoral centers be closed even though no voters remained in line. Rosales' spokesman also alerted about the reopening of already closed centers. CNE member Vicente Díaz later reaffirmed that all polling stations without voters in line must be closed, and that no booths under any circumstances could be reopened.

The Carter Center concluded that the elections were "fair, transparent and without serious irregularities".

A study conducted by Ezequiel Zamora (former vice president of the CNE), Freddy Malpica (former rector of the Universidad Simón Bolívar), Guillermo Salas (USB professor), Jorge Tamayo (UCV professor), Ramiro Esparragoza (UCV professor), four statistics experts and three computer engineers concluded in January 2007 that the 2006 presidential elections presented "important statistical inconsistencies, despite the fact that the opposition candidate recognized the results". They argued that the elections results of many electoral centers showed a very regular statistical distribution of the votes in favor of Rosales in comparison with the dispersion of the votes for Chávez. This suggest that the regularities are the possible result of numerical ceilings embedded in the voting machines. Also there seems to be a regular statistical abstention of 25% in most electoral centers and no signs of dispersion. They have recommended further studies of the data in order to understand the deficiencies of the Venezuelan electoral system and in order to have a "minimum of transparency" in any future electoral process.

=== Concerns over the Electoral Registry ===
Opposition candidates and political parties voiced concerns over possible inaccuracies of the national electoral registry. Previous elections had shown that there might be a great number of deceased people still on the records. A review process started in mid-2006 where the CNE asked all the public universities of Venezuela to conduct also an external review of the electoral registry. However, the review project presented by the Central University of Venezuela, Simón Bolívar University and the Andrés Bello Catholic University was rejected by the CNE. One of the proposed methods by these institutions was comparing census data with the electoral registry.

The CNE performed an audit with the aid of seven other public universities and with the Carter Center and two senators from the Belgian parliament observing the audit. The senators were Jacinta de Roeck, independent, and Sfia Bouarfa, from the French-speaking Socialist Party.

In June 2006, a privately funded preliminary study by Genaro Mosquera, a statistics professor at the Central University and member of the political party Democratic Action, claimed that in the last three years the registry grew 27% compare to a population growth of only 7.3% during those years and also a much larger growth than the regular increase of the registry of 12% every five years between 1948 and 2000. One of the flagship government Bolivarian Missions was Mission Identidad, where roughly 5 million citizens were awarded an ID card and the right to register and vote. Also, by comparing the official population numbers provided with by the Office of National Statistics with the CNE registry, there seems to be more register voters of 45 years of age and over than actual population.

According to NGO Ojo Electoral (Electoral Eye) preliminary results of a comparison between the Electoral Registry and demographic projections of the National Institute of Statistics (INE) suggests that inconsistencies in the voter data base cannot modify the results of the election.

=== Other concerns ===
The opposition claimed there was unfair pressure by the government against governmental workers who might not want to support the president. They released a video that showed energy minister and head of PDVSA, Rafael Ramírez, telling state oil workers to back President Hugo Chávez or to leave their jobs. He also said PDVSA is red "from top to bottom"(PDVSA es roja, rojita de arriba abajo). He also said that PDVSA's "workers are with this revolution, and those who aren't should go somewhere else. Go to Miami." Opposition media outlets have been repeating the 14-minute video over and over again. President Chávez said he supported the PDVSA director and recommended him to make the same speech to oil workers 100 times a day. The CNE opened an investigation into Rafael Ramírez following the protests from the opposition and Ramírez was eventually fined.

== Results ==
The 29 January 2007 report from the CNE showed the following results:

Candidate	Party	Votes	%
Hugo Chávez	Fifth Republic Movement	7,309,080	62.85
Manuel Rosales	A New Era	4,292,466	36.91
Luis Reyes	Joven	4,807	0.04
Venezuela Da Silva	New Social Order	3,980	0.03
Carmelo Romano Pérez	Liberal United People Movement	3,735	0.03
Alejandro José Suárez Luzardo	Movimiento Sentir Nacional	2,956	0.03
Eudes Vera	Independent	2,806	0.02
Carolina Contreras	Independent	2,169	0.02
Pedro Aranguren	Movimiento Conciencia de País	2,064	0.02
José Tineo	Venezuelan Third Millennium National Party	1,502	0.01
Yudith Salazar	Hijos de la Patria	1,355	0.01
Ángel Yrigoyen	Let Us Break Chains	1,316	0.01
Homer Rodríguez	Out of Love for Venezuela	1,123	0.01
Isbelia León	Strength and Peace Institution	793	0.01
Total		11,630,152	100.00
Valid votes		11,630,152	98.64
Invalid/blank votes		160,245	1.36
Total votes		11,790,397	100.00
Registered voters/turnout		15,921,223	74.05
Source: CNE, OAS

=== Electoral audits ===
Even though a fair number of international observers were present, the CNE instituted an open and public series of audits of the vote results. Each one of the 11,118 automated polling places was equipped with multiple high-tech touch-screen DRE voting machines, one to a "mesa electoral," or "voting table." In total, 32,331 voting machines were in use country-wide. After the vote is cast, each machine prints out a paper ballot, or VVPAT, which is inspected by the voter and deposited in a ballot box belonging to the machine's table. The voting machines perform in a stand-alone fashion, disconnected from any network until the polls close. Voting session closure at each of the voting stations in a given polling center is determined either by the lack of further voters after the lines have emptied, or by the hour, at the discretion of the president of the voting table.

=== Tally scrutinization ===
After the polls close at any voting table, the following steps are carried out:

- The DRE voting machine is ordered to close the voting session.
- Tally scrutinization announced.
- Each voting machine prints an original tally sheet, each has a voter total and the number of votes cast for each candidate cast in that particular machine/table.
- Each voting machine is connected to the network and the results are sent to the vote counting center.
- Nine extra tally sheets are printed and distributed to the staff and the six representatives of the candidates that received the most votes.
- With the original tally sheet in hand the total number of votes cast is compared to the signed up sheet or electoral notebook. Finally, for those machines chosen for the audit (see below) the electoral ballots, or paper trails, are counted one by one to determine if they add up to the totals in the tally sheet. Any anomaly is mentioned in the tally sheet report, signed by the staff and auditors, and then sealed and given to the military for delivery to the CNE.

=== Random paper ballot audit ===
Once the tally scrutinization is complete the staff proceeds to perform a random paper ballot audit of 54.31% of the machines. Each voting center can have anywhere from one to twelve voting machines, occasionally up to fifteen. The staff randomly selects the tables/machines by drawing a number out of a paper hat. The size of the draw is dependent on the number of tables/machines.

Number of Machines	Number of Machines to be Audited	Total Machines audited
1 to 2	1	5,795
3 to 5	2	6,002
6 to 8	3	4,011
9 to 10	4	980
More than 10	5	770

Audited Total	Machine Universe	Percentage audited
17,558	32,331	54.31%

The following procedures occur step by step:

- Polls closed
- Tally scrutinization finishes
- Random paper ballot audit announced
- The machines are randomly selected drawing numbers out of a paper hat
- The machine's serial number is recorded
- The corresponding paper ballot box is selected and opened
- The paper ballots results for each candidate are openly counted
- With the original tally printed from the electronic results, both results are audited
- Any anomaly (even if by one vote) is recorded in the audit report
- The original audit report is signed by staff and observers, officially sealed and handed to the military for delivery to the CNE
- Copies are handed over to the representatives of the two highest vote getters.

== Reactions ==
Shortly after the first set of partial results was broadcast on the night of the election, Chávez appeared on the Balcón del Pueblo (People's Balcony) in the presidential palace to celebrate his victory and address his followers. Chávez announced that a new era has started in Bolivarian development, focused in the expansion of the Bolivarian Revolution.

That same night, Manuel Rosales made a brief speech to the nation, recognizing that he had been defeated; however, he insisted that the two exit poll studies his supporters had made, and the results of the audits, showed a narrower difference between him and Chávez than was reported by Lucena. Rosales said in his speech that he and his supporters "will be in streets to prove that the results by the National Electoral Council are not correct, that the gap is narrower that what presented."
