= Inti (disambiguation) =

Inti is the Incan sun god. Inti may also refer to:

== Technology and Science ==
- INTI, Instituto Nacional de Tecnología Industrial (Argentina)
- Inti (insect), a wasp genus in the family Eulophidae
- Inti (plant), a plant genus in the subtribe Maxillariinae

== Education ==
- INTI International University, a group of universities in Southeast Asia

== Organizations ==
- Comunidad Inti Wara Yassi, a volunteer-supported non-governmental organization in Bolivia that maintains wildlife refuges
- Instituto Nacional de Tierras, Venezuelan government agency for land
- Inti Creates, a Japanese video game development company
- Inti Gas Deportes, a Peruvian football club located in Huamanga, Ayacucho
- Puka Inti, a small Maoist guerrilla organization in Ecuador

== People ==
- Inti Briones (born 1971), a Peruvian–Chilean cinematographer
- Inti Muñoz Santini (born 1974), a Mexican politician
- Inti Pestoni (born 1991), a Swiss ice hockey player who is currently playing for HC Ambrì-Piotta of National League A
- Inti Podestá (born 1978), a former Uruguayan football player, who played as a midfielder
- Inti (Jntj), daughter of pharaoh Teti of the Sixth Dynasty of Egypt
- Senedjemib Inti, a vizier from the Fifth dynasty of Egypt during the reign of king Djedkare Isesi
- Inti (drag queen), Spanish drag queen
- Inti (Ancient Egyptian official)

== Other ==
- Inti Raymi, a religious ceremony of the Inca Empire in honor of the god Inti
- Inti Rumi, a mountain in the Bolivian Andes
- Inti-Illimani, an instrumental and vocal Latin American folk music ensemble from Chile.
- Peruvian inti, a former currency of Peru

== See also ==
- Intiguttu (disambiguation)
