= Economic policy of the Hugo Chávez administration =

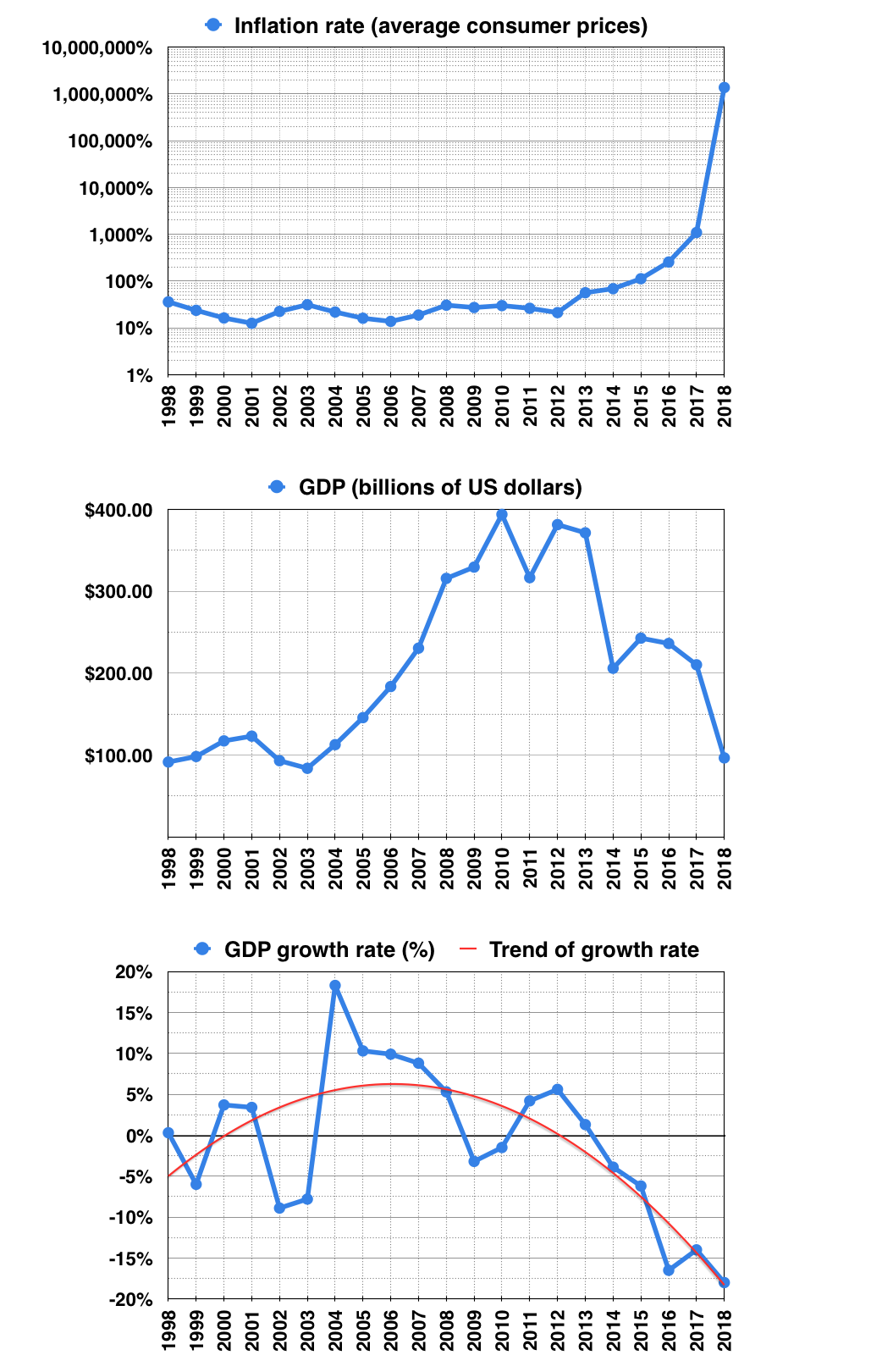
The blue line represents annual rates whereas the red line represents trends of annual rates given throughout the period shown. The Chávez government lasted between 1999 and 2013 (sources: International Monetary Fund, World Bank and Central Intelligence Agency)

From his election in 1998 until his death in March 2013, the administration of the late Venezuelan President Hugo Chávez proposed and enacted populist economic policies as part of his Bolivarian Revolution.

In the early 2000s when oil prices soared and offered Chávez funds not seen since the beginning of Venezuela's economic collapse in the 1980s, Chávez's government became "semi-authoritarian and hyper-populist" and consolidated its power over the economy in order to gain control of large amounts of resources. Domestically, Chávez used such oil funds for populist policies, creating the "Bolivarian missions", aimed at providing public services to improve economic, cultural and social conditions.

As Chávez's successor Nicolás Maduro began to increase domestic spending after the oil price collapse, high inflation, currency controls, an unfriendly environment with private businesses, as well as the risk of default, prevented the entrance of stronger foreign currencies into Venezuela. Previously, the Chávez government turned to China to fund its overspending on social programs. Despite warnings near the beginning of Chávez's tenure in the early 2000s, his government continuously overspent in social spending and did not save enough money for any future economic turmoil, which Venezuela faced shortly before and after his death. Other industries suffered as a result of the over-reliance on oil, with the share of manufacturing in GDP dropping from 17.4% in 1998 when Chávez took office to 14.2% in 2012. As a result of Chávez's overspending and policies such as price controls, there were shortages in Venezuela and the inflation rate grew to one of the highest in the world.

== Government policies ==
=== Petroleum and natural resources ===
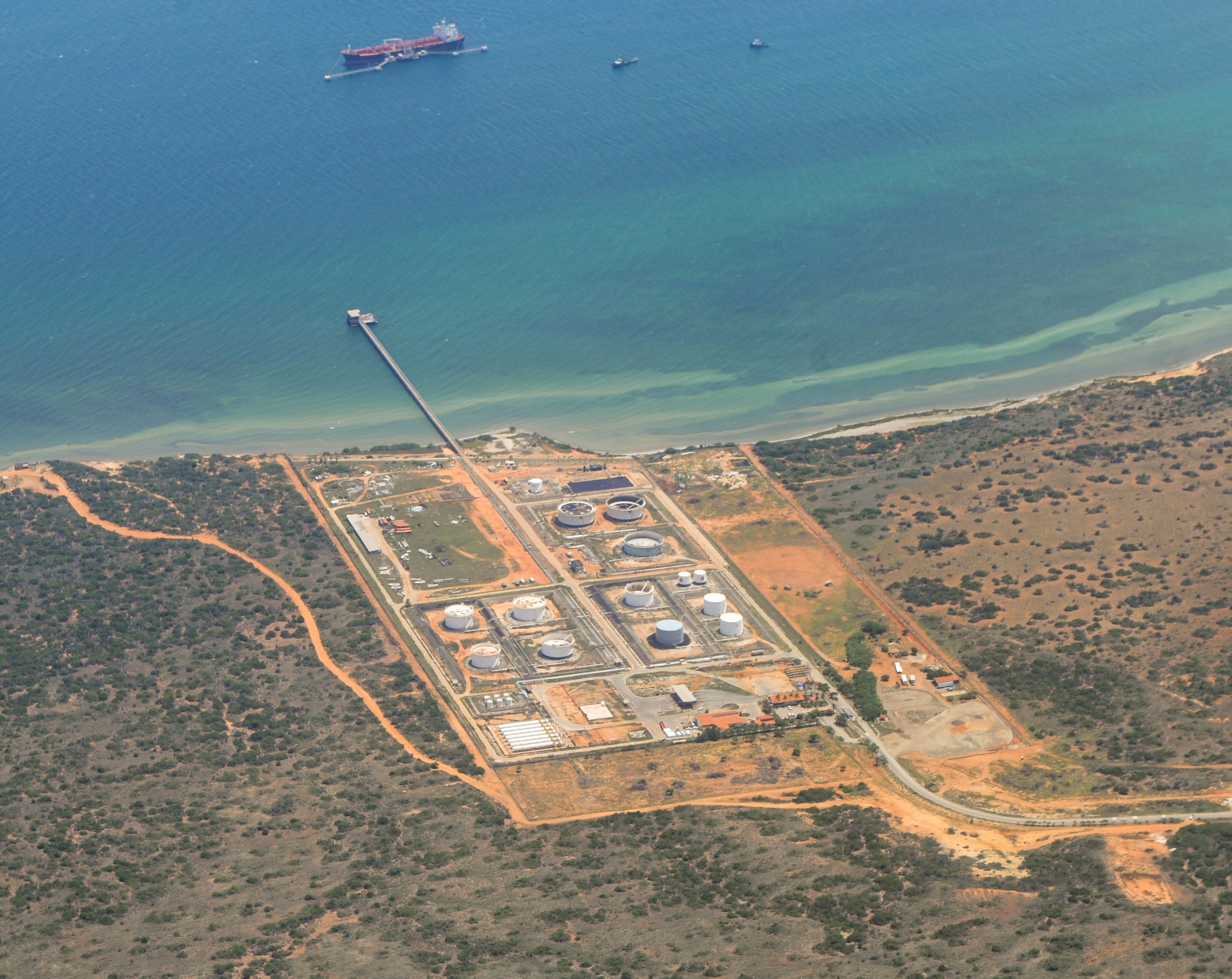
PDVSA petroleum facility on Margarita Island.

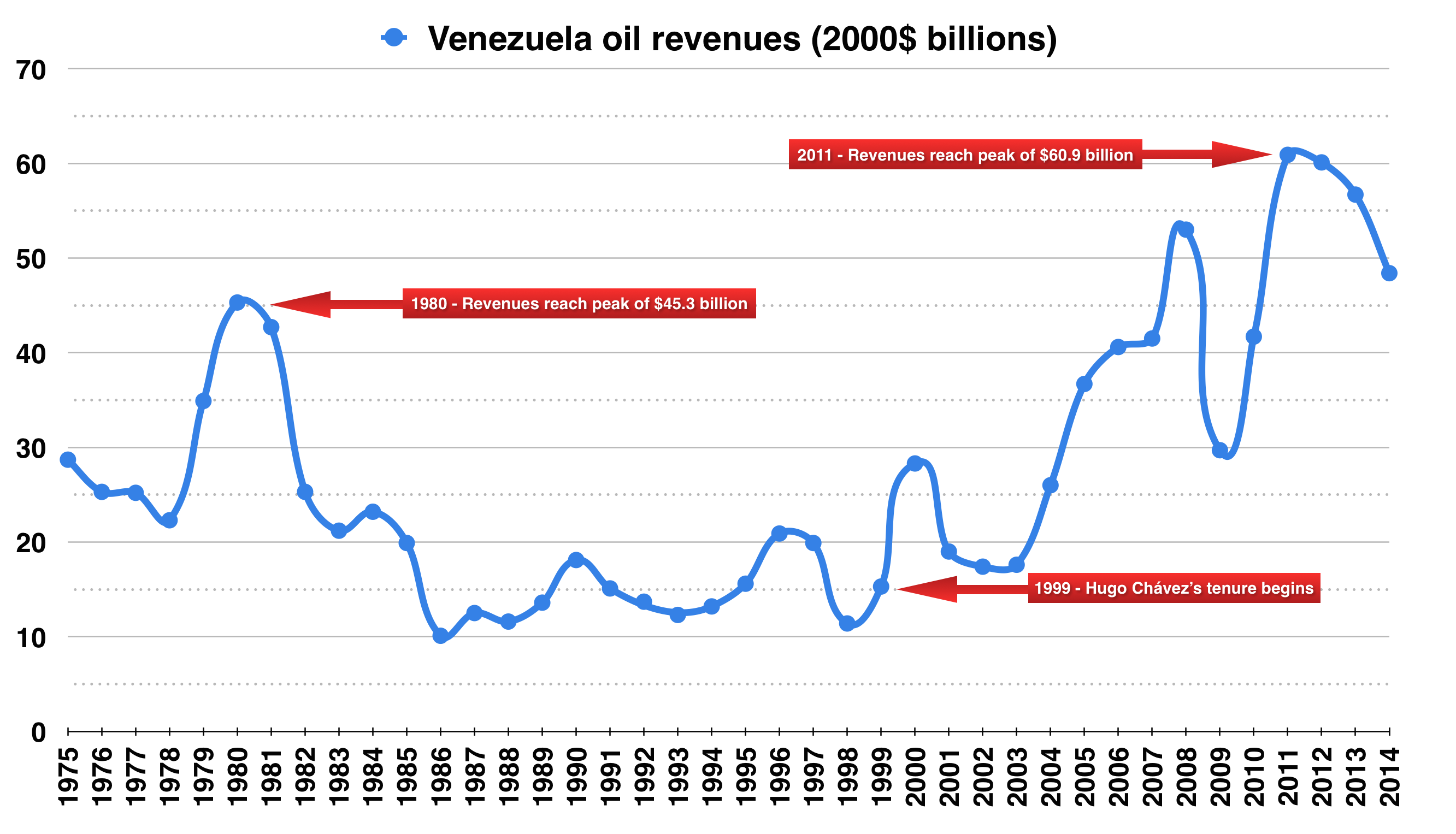
High oil prices in the 2000s not seen since Venezuela's economic decline in the 1980s were a main factor for Chávez's initial successes.
Sources: EIA 1, EIA 2

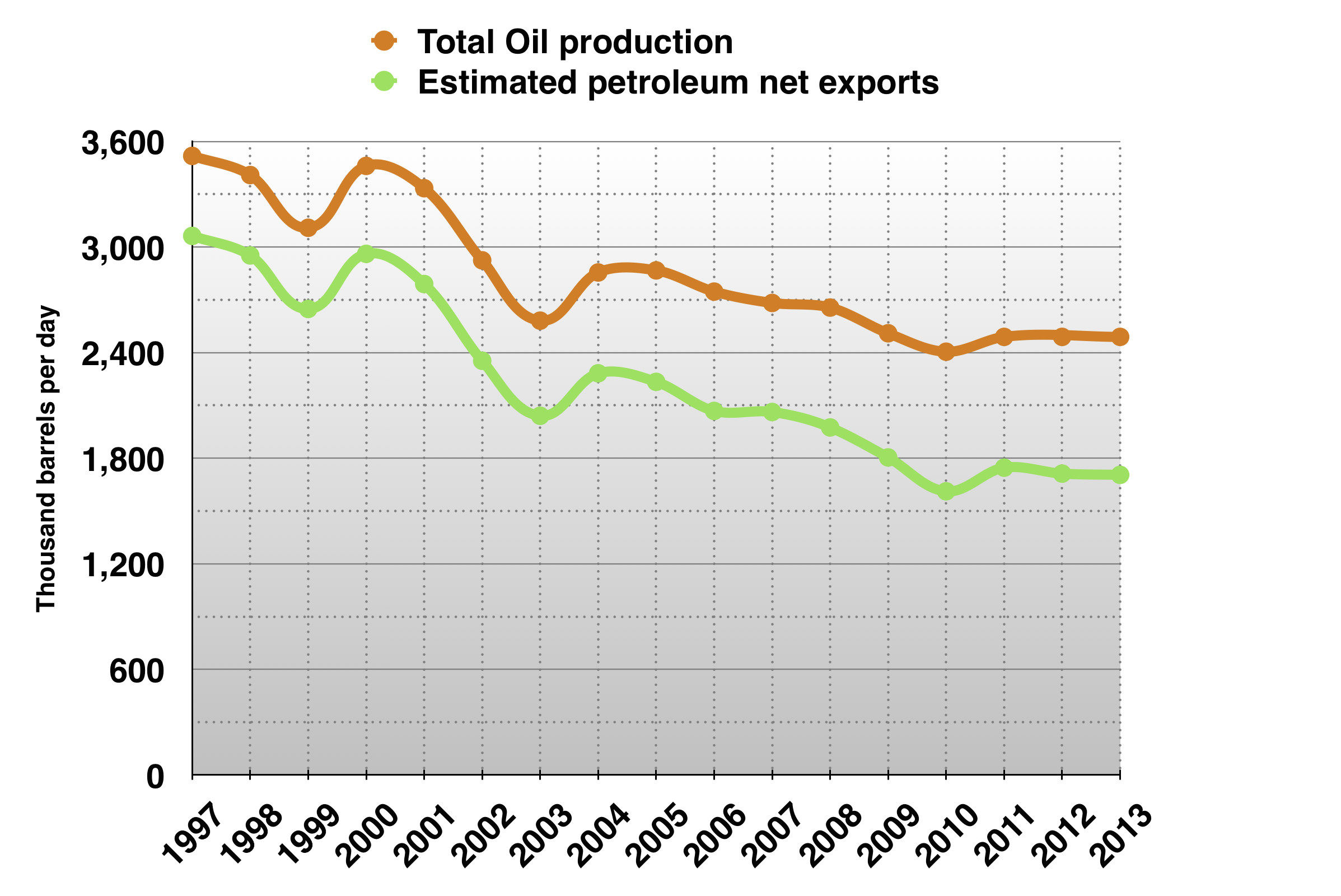
Oil production and net petroleum exports. Reductions in exports raised oil prices, assisting Chávez's policies.
Source: EIA

Venezuela is a major producer of oil products, which remains the keystone of the Venezuelan economy. Under the Chávez government, crude oil production decreased from 3.12 million barrels a day when Chávez took office in 1999, to 2.95 million barrels a day in 2007, whilst oil prices increased 660%. Stephen Randall, Director of the University of Calgary's Latin American Research Centre, points out that during Chávez's years in power Venezuela increased its dependency on oil exports to 95% (2012) from 80% when he took power in 1999. Furthermore, before the financial crisis in 2008 Venezuelan oil was selling at $129/barrel. It then dropped to $43/bbl by March 2009. Instead of reining in spending Chavez responded to reduced revenues by introducing more exchange controls and continuing with nationalizations. A 2014 article by CNBC stated that under Chávez, oil production declined from 3.5 million barrels per day to 2.6 million barrels per day, though Venezuela only made a profit from 1.4 million barrels per day due to Venezuela giving large amounts of its oil away for free. CNBC continued stating that though oil production decreased, public spending increased to over 50% of the GDP, spending more than received in oil profits which led to foreign loans that amounted to over $106 billion as of 2012. Foreign investment flows by the end of his presidency in 2013 were half what they had been in 1999.

On 13 November 2001, under an enabling law authorized by the National Assembly, Chávez enacted the Hydrocarbons Law, through which it sought to gain greater state control over the oil industry. The law increased the transnational companies taxation in oil extraction activities to 30% and set the minimum state participation in "mixed companies" at 51%, whereby the state-run oil company, Petróleos de Venezuela S.A. (PDVSA), could have joint control with private companies over industry.

Chávez used PDVSA funds to support political projects. Chávez also explored the liquidation of some or all of the assets belonging to PDVSA's US-based subsidiary, Citgo, which received criticism amongst the Venezuelan public due to corruption. According to finance minister Nelson Merentes, the Venezuelan 2006 budget would get more income from taxation than from the petroleum industry, unlike formerly.

In 2012, analysts said that PDVSA was in a "crisis" since "in the last ten years, they haven't been able to grow production". Analysts and OPEC also disagreed with Venezuela's claims of oil output. Critics have also noticed that investments in oil and natural gas production only amounted to US$17.9 billion while the government spent US$30.1 billion on social programs and Russian fighter jets. The secretary general of the United Federation of Petroleum Workers of Venezuela (FUTPV) said "PDVSA is falling apart" and that "lack of direction, investment and maintenance are wrecking the oil and natural gas industries". Critics have also accused Chavez of letting loyalists run PDVSA instead of those qualified for the positions since the company only hires political supporters of the president. In 2013, PDVSA took more than US$10 billion in loans from China and Russia due to an alleged lack of hard currency and had a financial debt of US$39.2 billion.

=== Cooperatives and economic democratization ===
Since Chávez was elected in 1998, over 100,000 worker-owned cooperatives—representing approximately 1.5 million people—were formed with the assistance of government start-up credit, technical training, and by giving preferential treatment to cooperatives in state purchases of goods and equipment. There has been an increase in the amount of cooperative enterprises that have tax incentives in the new 1999 constitution. As of 2005, approximately 16% of Venezuela's formally employed citizens were employed in a cooperative. However, a 2006 census showed that as many as 50% of the cooperatives were either functioning improperly, or were fraudulently created to gain access to public funds.

Additionally, several thousand "Communal Councils" (Consejos Communales) were created. In these Communal councils, citizens form assemblies to determine what will be done with government funds in their local area. Groups are made up of 150-200 or more families in urban areas, and starting at around 15-20 families in rural areas, and their decisions are binding to local government officials. 21,000 of these groups were created in 2007, and 30,179 by 2009. As of 2007, about 30% of state funds were directly controlled by communal councils, with a goal of eventually having them control 50%.

Banking laws passed in 2001 require that all banks set aside at least 3% of their capital for micro-loans.

=== Poverty reduction programs and social spending ===
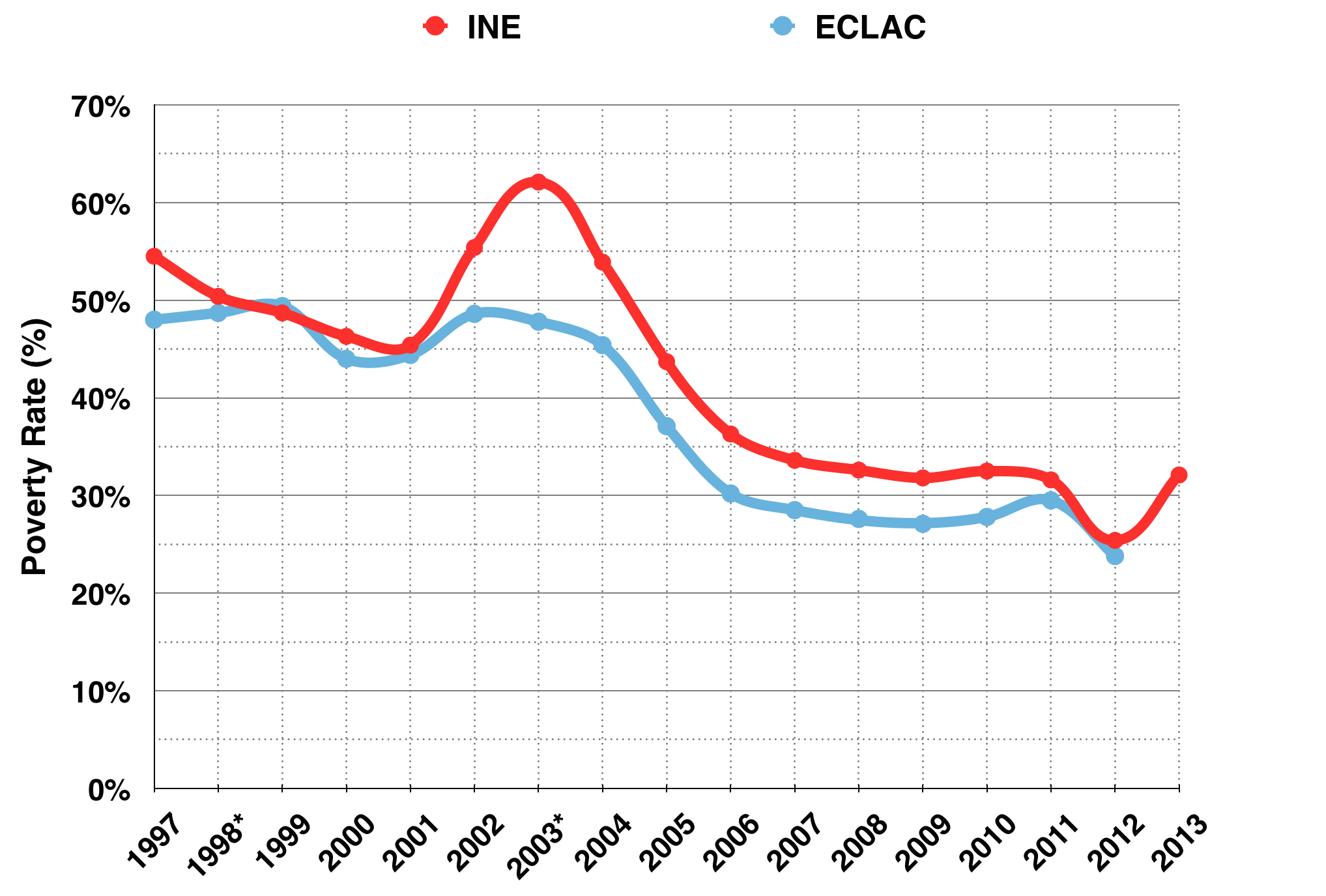
Data from various sources of Venezuela's poverty rate (%) from 1997–2013. Sources: ECLAC, INE

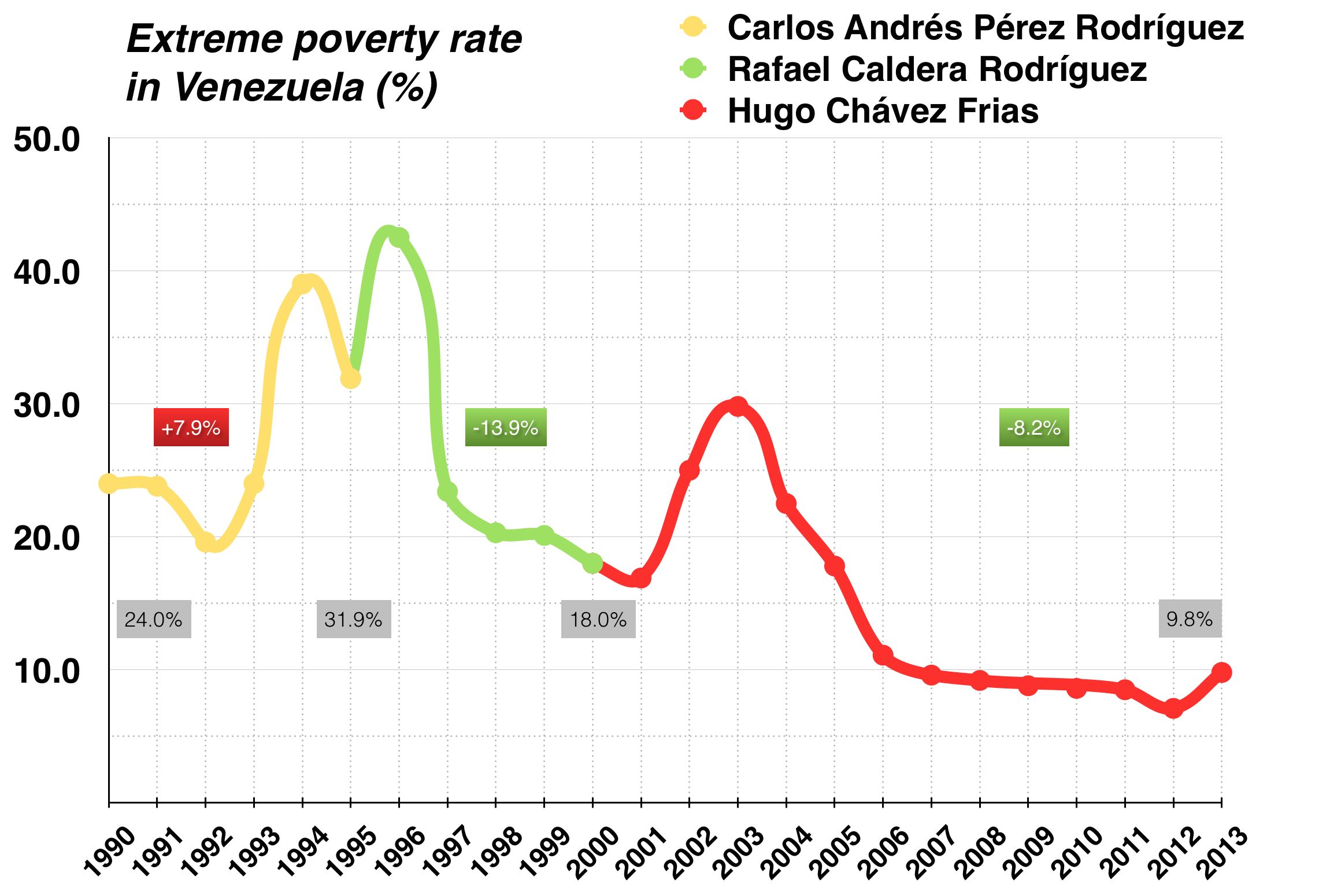
Venezuela's extreme poverty rate from 1990 to 2013. Source: INE * Interim presidents excluded. One year delay of data transferred during presidential term changes due to new policies, inaugurations, etc.

One of the primary ways that the Chávez administration attempted to fix the problem of economic inequality was by wealth redistribution, primarily via land reform, and social programs. The Chávez government pursued a series of Bolivarian Missions aimed at providing public services (such as food, healthcare, and education) to improve economic, cultural, and social conditions. According to the United Nations Economic Commission for Latin America and the Caribbean (ECLAC), poverty rates fell from 49.4% in 1999 to 23.9% in 2012. Data from the National Institute of Statistics (INE) shows that Venezuela's poverty rate decreased between 1999 and 2013 from 48.7% to 32.1%. A 2010 OAS report criticizing Venezuela's human rights standards indicated achievements in addressing illiteracy, healthcare and poverty, and economic and social advances.

The Chávez government overspent in social spending, however, and did not save enough money for any future economic difficulties. On 31 March 2000, Chávez initiated policies that resulted with the Venezuelan government spending more than it received as oil prices began to rise. Poverty in Venezuela began increasing going into the 2010s. During Chávez's campaign before the 2012 presidential election, he tripled Venezuela's deficit while on a "spending spree". In 2014 El Universal reported that in the previous five years that included years under Chávez's policies, purchasing power for those with minimum wage jobs had dramatically decreased compared to other countries in the region, supposedly due to the high inflation rate and the multiple devaluations of Venezuela's currency.

==== Price controls ====
The Venezuelan government also set price controls in 2003 on around 400 basic foods in an effort according to The Washington Post, to "counter inflation and protect the poor", and in March 2009, they set minimum production quotas for 12 basic foods that were subject to price controls, including white rice, cooking oil, coffee, sugar, powdered milk, cheese, and tomato sauce. However, the lack of free-floating currency meant that the government was overpaying for these foods, which led shortages as limited amount of these foods began to be imported, even while demand was growing.

==== Missions and other projects ====
Chávez created many projects and missions during his presidency, though he often took credit for some started by his predecessors as well. Many projects initiated during his presidency have remained incomplete and have experienced difficulties due to funding issues, political costs, corruption and bad execution. As of late 2013, over 4,000 projects initiated remained incomplete with 25% of those projects beginning before 2006. Despite the investment of billions of dollars, such projects that were not completed and experienced multiple delays included repairs to the Parque Central Complex, moving the Las Mayas garbage center, the clean up of the Guaire River, a National Cancer Center, Plan Vargas 2005, and multiple transportation projects.

Chávez also initiated Mission Habitat, a Venezuelan government program to construct new housing units for the poor. The housing mission has also experienced difficulties with El Universal stating that one of the Chávez administration's outstanding weaknesses was the failure to meet its goals of construction of housing. Chávez promised to build 150,000 houses in 2006, but in the first half of the year, completed only 24 percent of that target, with 35,000 houses. In 2013, the Venezuelan government also failed to complete nearly 50% of projected homes. The housing market in Venezuela had also shrunk significantly. Developers have avoided Venezuela due to the massive number of companies who have had their property expropriated by the government.

According to the Venezuelan government, the "Miracle Mission" program had the Venezuela and Cuban governments collaborated to perform free eye care to over 1,139,798 people, with an average of 5,000 operations occurring on a weekly basis in 74 medical centers around Venezuela, as of July 2010.

=== Agriculture and land reform ===
From 2003, Chavez set strict price controls on food, and these price controls caused shortages and hoarding. In January 2008, Chavez ordered the military to seize 750 tons of food that sellers were illegally trying to smuggle across the border to sell for higher prices than what was legal in Venezuela. In February 2009, Chavez ordered the military to temporarily seize control of all the rice processing plants in the country and force them to produce at full capacity, which he claimed they had been avoiding in response to the price caps. In May 2010, Chavez ordered the military to seize 120 tons of food from Empresas Polar. In March 2009, Chavez set minimum production quotas for 12 basic foods that were subject to price controls, including white rice, cooking oil, coffee, sugar, powdered milk, cheese, and tomato sauce. Business leaders and food producers claimed that the government was forcing them to produce this food at a loss. Chávez nationalized many large farms. Chávez said of the farmland, "The land is not private. It is the property of the state." Some of the farmland that had been productive while under private ownership is now idle under government ownership, and some of the farm equipment sits gathering dust. As a result, food production fell substantially. One farmer, referring to the government officials overseeing the land redistribution, stated, "These people know nothing about agriculture." Chávez seized many supermarkets from their owners. Under government ownership, the shelves in these supermarkets are often empty. In 2010, after the government nationalized the port at Puerto Cabello, more than 120,000 tons of food sat rotting at the port. In May 2010, after price controls caused shortages of beef, at least 40 butchers were arrested, and some of them were held at a military base and later strip searched by police.

Although the Venezuelan government allows small farmers to work the land, it does not always give them title to the land, and they are sometimes required to work as part of a collective. This reallocation of land does not necessarily lead to better food production; farmers are hurt by the state setting low prices for their produce.

The government also tried to introduce large-scale urban agriculture to the populace, to increase local self-reliance. In Caracas, the government launched Organoponico Bolivar I, a pilot program to bring organopónicos to Venezuela. Urban agriculture was not embraced in Caracas as it has been in Cuba. Unlike Cuba, where organopónicos arose from the bottom-up out of necessity, the Venezuelan organopónicos were clearly a top-down initiative based on Cuba's success. Another problem for urban agriculture in Venezuela was the high amounts of pollution in major Venezuelan urban areas. At the Organoponico Bolivar I, a technician comes every 15 days to take a reading from the small pollution meter in the middle of the garden.

=== Nationalizations ===
In 2006, the Chávez government began nationalizing several industries as part of its policy of wealth redistribution and reducing the influence of multinational corporations. As a result of these nationalizations, production of goods in Venezuela had dropped.

- A 3 January 2007 article in the International Herald Tribune reported that price controls were causing shortages of materials used in the construction industry. In 2008, cement production was largely nationalised, with Venezuelan-located plants belonging to Mexico's Cemex, Switzerland's Holcim, and France's Lafarge being bought by the government. Compensations of $552 million for Holcim and $267 million for Lafarge were agreed upon, with both of those companies agreeing to stay on as minority partners and retaining 10 to 15 percent shares; the takeover from Cemex was less friendly and compensation had not been agreed on as of March 2009. According to a 4 April 2008 article from CBS News, Chavez ordered the nationalization of the cement industry, in response to the fact that the industry was exporting its products in order to receive prices above those which it was allowed to obtain within the country. In 2013, it was reported that production of cement dropped by 60%, furnaces stopped and cement had to be imported from Colombia. It was also reported that some stores had shortages of cement and would ration the number of cement bags purchased. Workers of the Socialist Cement Corporation protested against their employers due to not being paid and not being able to receive help at clinics due to company debt.
- Chavez nationalized Venezuela's largest telephone companies and electric utilities. The main telephone company, CANTV, was nationalised by buying US-based Verizon Communications' 28.5 percent share for $572 million. Since the nationalizations of communication companies, allegations of censorship by the government and CANTV have been made, especially during the 2014 Venezuelan protests.
- The nation's largest private electricity producer, 82-percent owned by US-based AES Corp, was obtained by paying $740 million to AES for its share. Since then, Venezuela's electrical grid has been plagued with occasional blackouts in various districts of the country. In 2011, it had so many problems that rations on electricity were put in place to help ease blackouts. On 3 September 2013, 70% of the country plunged into darkness with 14 of 23 states of Venezuela stating they did not have electricity for most of the day.
- In 2008 the Venezuelan government nationalized the leading steel company, Argentine-controlled SIDOR, following months of strikes and labour-management disputes. Since the nationalization of SIDOR, the production of the company has dropped every year.
- In 2008 Chávez ordered the halting of the construction of a mega-shopping mall, in downtown Caracas by Sambil, saying that it was inappropriate development in an already overcrowded, over-trafficked area. He suggested the land would be nationalized and turned into a hospital or university. Since then, the mall has rarely been used. It opens occasionally and its parking garage shelters the homeless.
- A food plant owned by US giant Cargill was nationalised in early 2009.
- On 28 February 2009 Chavez ordered the military to temporarily seize control of all the rice processing plants in the country and force them to produce at full capacity, which he claimed they had been avoiding in response to the price caps.
- Banco de Venezuela was nationalized in 2009; Banco Bicentenario was created in late 2009 from nationalized banks taken over in the course of the Venezuelan banking crisis of 2009-2010.

=== Taxation ===
The Venezuelan government instituted several new taxes on non-priority and luxury goods, aiming to shift the nation's tax burden from the poor to the wealthy, and to control inflation. In 2012, Venezuela's taxes were ranked 188th out of 189 countries due to the high number of payments per year and a 61.7% tax on income per year.

From March 2009 VAT tax rate was raised to 12% to cover for oil price reduction

=== Infrastructure ===
==== Transportation ====
Despite the large scale of road building beginning in the 1960s that benefitted the aluminum and oil industry; public services, especially within the infrastructure of Venezuela, was poor. At the beginning of August 2008, Chávez announced that Venezuela would partner with Argentina and Brazil to build a train that would connect Venezuela's capital (Caracas) with Argentina's (Buenos Aires), and cities in between.

Venezuela's rail project is being put on hold due to Venezuela not being able to pay the $7.5 billion and owing China Railway nearly $500 million.

=== International economic policies ===
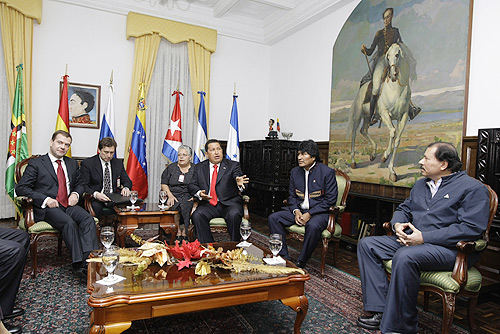
Dmitry Medvedev, Hugo Chávez, Evo Morales, and Daniel Ortega met to discuss the proposed regional economic bloc known as ALBA on 27 November 2008.

One of the Chávez administration's primary goals was to reduce the influence of foreign capitalists in Venezuela, as part of its overall push towards localized economic democratization. Towards this aim, it strongly promoted various forms of Latin American economic and political integration—such as regional currencies (e.g. SUCRE, somewhat analogous to the Euro), regional credit/financial institutions such as Bancosur (to remove dependence on the IMF/World Bank), and trade pacts (such as ALBA, Petrosur, or bartering oil for doctors with Cuba).

The SUCRE system is a virtual currency system used mainly by Venezuela and Ecuador. There are some risks such as money laundering and fraud. However, it has been seen as beneficial for trade since Ecuador uses the United States dollar as its national currency and Venezuela's strict currency controls have created a US dollar shortage in Venezuela.

==== Regional integration ====
Cuba, Nicaragua, Honduras, Bolivia, and Ecuador joined Venezuela as members of the Bolivaran Alliance for the Americas (ALBA). Chávez described ALBA as "a flexible model for the integration of Latin America that places social concerns in the forefront."

==== Foreign debt ====
Chávez announced Venezuela's withdrawal from the International Monetary Fund and World Bank after paying back all his country's debts to both institutions; he charged them with being an imperial tool that aims to exploit poor countries, news sources reported. But as of March 2008, Venezuela is still a member of both institutions.

In 2005, the Venezuelan government partnered with Argentina, and Brazil to negotiate their foreign debt as a collective bloc. Chávez also suggested that at least 10% of all Latin American foreign debt be paid into an "International Humanitarian Fund", that would be used to fund social programs without having structural adjustment requirements attached.

The Venezuelan government had been running out of hard currency to pay bills before the death of Chavez. A major railway project in Venezuela was delayed because Venezuela cannot pay US$7.5 billion and owes China Railway nearly US$500 million. Many international airlines such as Air Canada, Air Europa, American Airlines, and United Airlines suspended operation in Venezuela. The Venezuelan government faced accusations of owing international airlines more than $3.7 billion and violating treaties, with the International Air Transport Association accusing the government of failing to "repatriate" $3.7 billion in air ticket revenue owed to foreign airlines.

==== Currency and foreign reserves ====
When initially elected into office in 1998, Chávez promised that he would not create currency exchange controls.

In order to prevent capital flight, and maintain the stability of the Venezuelan bolívar, the Chávez administration enacted strict currency controls in January 2003, making it more difficult for investors to exchange bolívars for dollars. The controls forced many Venezuelan investors to seek out domestic investment opportunities, rather than foreign investments. It also resulted in a large increase in foreign currency reserves, which had reached $35 billion by 2006, which is as high as Canada's (which has a slightly higher population), and on a per capita basis is much larger than Germany's ($55 billion) By the end of 2013, gold and foreign reserves of Venezuela dropped $9 billion in one year to $21 billion.

Since the currency controls were imposed in 2003, there was a series of devaluations, disrupting the economy; the devaluation of February 2013 was the seventh since Chavez took power.

==== Foreign trade ====
Foreign trade from Venezuela was ranked 179 out of 185 countries due to many reasons. One was the large number of documents that are needed in order to export and import. The amount of time to export goods from Venezuela is more than 5 times longer than the average country with the time importing is 8 times longer than average. Prices for trade are also 3 times higher than the average country.

Even though Venezuela has been trying to seek autonomy from most foreign countries, the United States has continued to be its largest trade partner. Venezuela sends 39.3% of its exports to the United States and the majority of imports compiling to 31.2% are from the United States.

== Economic indicators ==
=== Economic growth and production ===
The Chavez government's confiscations of private businesses, especially oil businesses, greatly weakened the private sector; oil production collapsed. The government of Venezuela treats PDVSA as a cash-cow, and the company only hires political supporters of the president. The GDP of Venezuela was approximately the same in 2012 as it was in the 1970s.

For the year 2009, the Venezuelan economy shrank by an average of 2.9% due to the global recession.

=== Income and poverty ===
Datos reports real income grew by 137% between 2003 and Q1 2006. The World Bank estimates that 31.9% are below the poverty line.

Social scientists and economists have declared that the government's reported income poverty figures did not fall in proportion to the country's vast petroleum revenues in the last two years, much of which was directed to social spending to decrease the cost of living.

Venezuela's infant mortality rate fell by 18.2% between 1998 and 2006.

=== Consumer prices and inflation ===
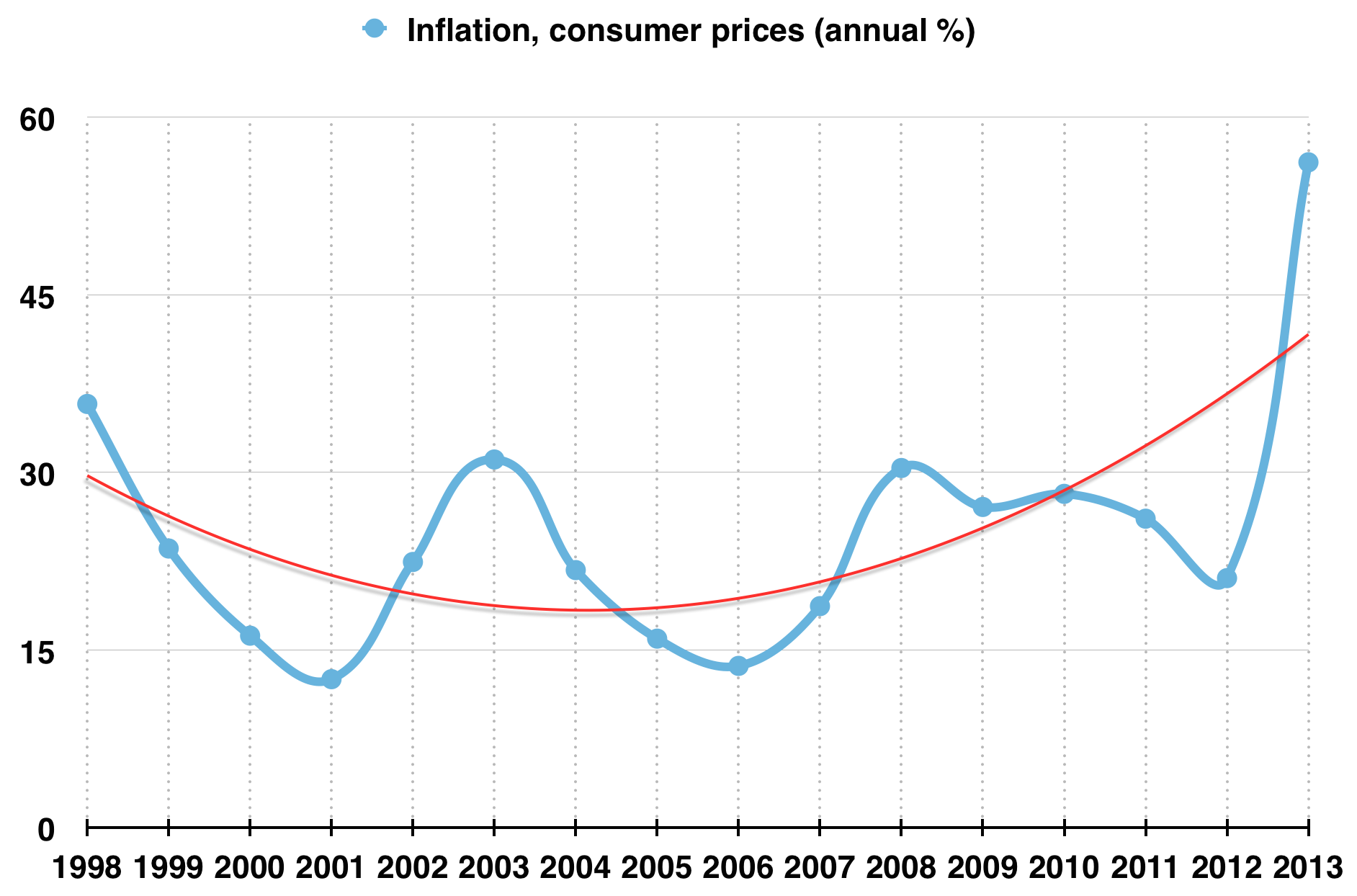
Inflation: 1998-2013 The blue line represents annual inflation rates while the red line represents the trend of inflation rates. Sources: International Monetary Fund: Data & Statistics CIA: The World Factbook Reuters.

When Chávez took office, the annual inflation rate was at 29.5% and according to Banco Central de Venezuela, inflation dropped to 14.4% in 2005. During 2005, imported goods were cheaper than commodities made in Venezuela; variability in the price of goods was linked to import performance and exchange stability. In the second quarter of 2006, gross fixed investment was the highest ever recorded by the Banco Central de Venezuela since it started tracking the statistic in 1997.

In 2009 the inflation rate was 27.1%. According to the Economist, the Chávez government's economic policies, including strict price controls, have led to Venezuela having the highest inflation in the world at the time. When Chávez left office, the inflation rate was at 29.4%, which was .1% less than when he first took office.

=== Government spending ===
Teresa A. Meade wrote that Chávez's popularity "rests squarely on the lower classes who have benefited from these health initiatives and similar policies".

=== Implied value and currency black market ===
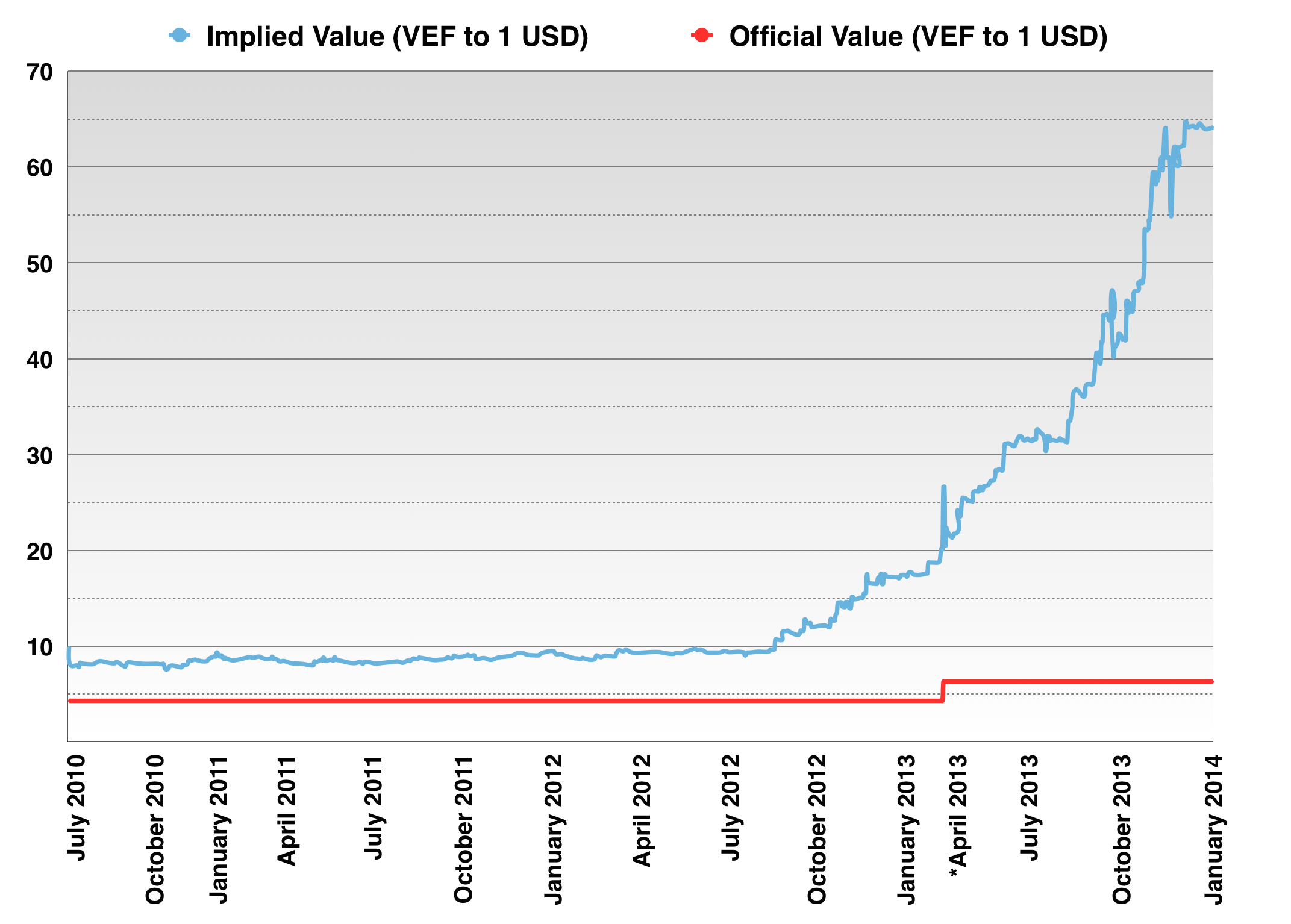
Blue line represents implied value of the hard bolívar (VEF) compared to the US dollar (USD). The red line represents what the Venezuelan government officially rates the hard bolívar. Sources: Banco Central de Venezuela, Dolar Paralelo, Federal Reserve Bank, International Monetary Fund.

The implied value or "black market value" is what Venezuelans believe the hard bolívar is worth compared to the United States dollar. In the first few years of Chavez's office, his newly created social programs required large payments in order to make the desired changes. On 5 February 2003, the government created CADIVI, a currency control board charged with handling foreign exchange procedures. Its creation was to control capital flight by placing limits on individuals and only offering them so much of a foreign currency. This limit to foreign currency led to a creation of a currency black market economy since Venezuelan merchants rely on foreign goods that require payments with reliable foreign currencies. As Venezuela printed more money for their social programs, the bolívar continued to devalue for Venezuelan citizens and merchants since the government held the majority of the more reliable currencies.

At the end of 2013, the official exchange rate was US$1 to Bs.F 6.3 while the black market exchange rate was over ten times higher since the actual value of the bolívar is overvalued for Venezuelan businesses. Since merchants can only receive so much necessary foreign currency from the government, they must resort to the black market which in turn raises the merchant's prices on consumers. The high rates in the black market make it difficult for businesses to purchase necessary goods since the government often forces these businesses to make price cuts. This leads to businesses selling their goods and making a low profit, such as Venezuelan McDonald's franchises offering a Big Mac meal for only $1. Since businesses make low profits, this leads to shortages since they are unable import the goods that Venezuela is reliant on. Venezuela's largest food producing company, Empresas Polar, has stated that they may need to suspend some production for nearly the entire year of 2014 since they owe foreign suppliers $463 million. The last report of shortages in Venezuela showed that 22.4% of necessary goods are not in stock. This was the last report by the government since the central bank no longer posts the scarcity index. This has led to speculation that the government is hiding its inability to control the economy which may create doubt about future economic data released.

=== Food and agriculture ===
When agricultural measures of the Chávez administration took effect, food imports rose dramatically, and such agricultural mainstays as beef, rice, and milk saw drops in production. With declining oil revenues, food shortages became more widespread. Venezuela faced serious food shortages, as the Chávez government's price controls distorted the market.

In January 2008, Chávez ordered the military to seize 750 tons of food that sellers were illegally trying to smuggle across the border to sell for higher prices than what was legal in Venezuela. In February 2009, Chávez ordered the military to temporarily seize control of all the rice processing plants in the country and force them to produce at full capacity, which he claimed they had been avoiding in response to the price caps. In May 2010, Chávez ordered the military to seize 120 tons of food from Empresas Polar after inconsistencies in reports from the Empresas Polar conglomerate were said to have been detected by authorities.

As part of his strategy of food security Chávez started a national chain of supermarkets, the Mercal network, which had 16,600 outlets and 85,000 employees that distributed food at highly discounted prices, and ran 6000 soup kitchens throughout the country. The food was sold at as much as 40% below the price ceiling set for privately owned stores. Simultaneously Chávez expropriated many private supermarkets. The Mercal network was criticized by some commentators as being a part of Chávez's strategy to brand himself as a provider of cheap food, and the shops feature his picture prominently. The Mercal network was subject to frequent scarcities of basic staples such as meat, milk and sugar – and when scarce products arrived, shoppers had to wait in line.

In March 2009, the Venezuelan government set minimum production quotas for 12 basic foods that were subject to price controls, including white rice, cooking oil, coffee, sugar, powdered milk, cheese, and tomato sauce, which is intended to stop food companies from evading the law. Business leaders and food producers claimed that the government was forcing them to produce this food at a loss. Chávez expropriated and redistributed 5 million acres of farmland from large landowners, saying: "The land is not private. It is the property of the state... The land is for those who work it." But, the lack of basic resources made it difficult or impossible to make full use of the expropriated lands by its new tenants – leading to a lower overall degree of productivity in spite of a larger overall area of land under cultivation.

In 2011, food prices in Caracas were nine times higher than when the price controls were put in place and resulted in shortages of cooking oil, chicken, powdered milk, cheese, sugar and meat. Datanálisis, an independent polling firm found that powdered milk could be found in less than half of grocery stores in Venezuela and that liquid milk was even more scarce in the country. Jose Guerra, former executive of the Central Bank of Venezuela (BCV) explained that Venezuela's large increases on purchasing food in 2012 and reserves that are at their lowest levels since 2004 contributed to dollar shortages that Venezuela suffered in the years following 2012.

In 2007 14,383 tonnes of milk, rice, pasta, beef and chicken, worth $54 million were also abandoned. In 2010, after the government nationalized the port at Puerto Cabello, more than 120,000 tons of food worth 10.5 bolívars sat rotting at the port. In May 2010, during a shortage of beef, at least 40 butchers were detained on charges of speculation for allegedly selling meat above the regulated price; some of them were held at a military base and later strip-searched by police.

=== Employment ===
According to government figures, unemployment dropped by 7.7% since the start of Chávez's presidency. It dropped to 10% in February 2006, from the 20% high in 2003 during a two-month strike and business lockout that shut down the country's oil industry. According to the government, an unemployed person is a citizen above the age of 15 who has been seeking employment for more than one week.

=== Business environment ===
According to Gilberto Gudino Millán, president of the Trade Union and Business Services in the Zulia State (UCEZ), 490,000 businesses had left Venezuela from 1998 to 2014 in what he called a "business holocaust". In 2006, the business environment in Venezuela was listed as "risky and discouraged investment", by El Universal. As measured by prices on local stock exchanges, foreign investors were willing to pay on average 16.3 years worth of earnings to invest in Colombian companies, 15.9 in Chile, 11.1 in Mexico, and 10.7 in Brazil, but only 5.8 in Venezuela. The World Economic Forum ranked Venezuela as 82 out of 102 countries on a measure of how favorable investment was for financial institutions. In Venezuela, a foreign investor needed an average of 119 days and had to complete 14 different applications to organize a business, while the average in OECD countries was 30 days and six applications. The International Finance Corporation ranked Venezuela one of the lowest countries for doing business ranking it 180 of 185 countries for its Doing Business 2013 report with protecting investors and taxes being its worst rankings.

In January 2013, The Heritage Foundation and The Wall Street Journal gave Venezuela's economic freedom a low score of 36.1, twenty points lower than 56.1 in 1999 and was ranked very low at 174 of 177 countries on its 2013 Index of Economic Freedom report with its freedom trend heading downward.

=== Foreign investment ===
In 2006, the business environment in Venezuela was listed as "risky and discouraged investment" by El Universal. As measured by prices on local stock exchanges, foreign investors were willing to pay on average 16.3 years worth of earnings to invest in Colombian companies, 15.9 in Chile, 11.1 in Mexico, and 10.7 in Brazil, but only 5.8 in Venezuela. The World Economic Forum ranked Venezuela as 82 out of 102 countries on a measure of how favorable investment was for financial institutions. In Venezuela, a foreign investor needed an average of 119 days and had to complete 14 different applications to organize a business, while the average in OECD countries was 30 days and six applications.

== See also ==
- Economy of Venezuela
- Shortages in Venezuela
