= Victor Cruz (disambiguation) =

Victor Cruz may refer to:

- Victor Cruz (American football) (born 1986), American football player
- Víctor Cruz (baseball) (1957–2004), Dominican Major League Baseball pitcher
- Victor Cruz Weffer, Venezuelan military officer
- Victor Hernández Cruz (born 1949), Puerto Rican poet
- Victor Santa Cruz (born 1972), American football coach and former player
