= Instituto Nacional de Tierras =

- Instituto Nacional de Tierras (INTI)

Government agency overview
- Formed: 8 January 2002
- Jurisdiction: Venezuela
- Headquarters: Caracas, Venezuela
- Annual budget: 9,641,179,497 Bs (2017)
- Government agency executive: David Hernández Giménez, President
- Parent Government agency: Ministry of Popular Power for Agriculture and Lands
- Key document: Ley de Tierras y Desarrollo Agrario (2001)
- Website: www.inti.gob.ve

Instituto Nacional de Tierras (INTI, National Land Institute) is one of the Venezuelan governmental organizations overseeing the land distribution program (Mission Zamora). INTI is charged with identifying fallow plots of land, which via eminent domain it can buy from the owners. After acquiring the land, INTI gives land-use rights (cartas agrarias) to other farmers. Those farmers have the right to pass the land as an inheritance, but they do not own it and cannot sell it. The tenant farmers are often organized into cooperatives (Fundos Zamoranos), with the assistance of Mission Vuelvan Caras). In addition, INTI identifies underused land and taxes landowners who are not producing enough. Mission Vuelta al Campo is also run by INTI.

The underlying legal framework draws on Article 307 of the 1999 Constitution of Venezuela as well as subsequent laws, including the 2001 Ley de Tierras y Desarrollo Agrario (LTDA), Law of Land and Agricultural Development.

== See also ==
- Agriculture in Venezuela
