= Weffer =

Weffer is a Venezuelan surname. Notable people with the surname include:

- Victor Cruz Weffer, commander-in-chief of the Venezuelan army
- Jaramit Weffer (born 1985), Venezuelan freestyle wrestler
