= Luzardo =

Luzardo is a surname. Notable people with the name include:

- Alejandro José Suárez Luzardo (born 1965), Venezuelan politician and lawyer
- Arsenio Luzardo (born 1959), Uruguayan footballer
- Celmira Luzardo (1952–2014), Colombian actress
- Gaston Parra Luzardo (1933–2008), Venezuelan academic, president of the Central Bank of Venezuela
- Jesús Luzardo (born 1997), Peruvian-born American professional baseball pitcher
- Manuel Rojas Luzardo (1831–1903), Puerto Rican-Venezuelan commander of the Puerto Rican Liberation Army
- Medardo Luis Luzardo Romero (1934–2018), Venezuelan Roman Catholic archbishop
- Olga Luzardo (1916–2016), Venezuelan journalist, poet and activist
- Sandra Luzardo (born 1999), Venezuelan footballer
- Ubay Luzardo (born 1983), Spanish former footballer

== See also ==
- Santos Luzardo National Park in Venezuela
