= Petrocasa =

Petrocasa ("Oil House") is a type of Venezuelan family houses, built in mass production. These houses are produced since 2007 by Corporación Petroquímica de Venezuela (Pequiven) and are largely utilized in rural areas under the public housing program, Mission Habitat. The houses typically have 70 m^{2} of living space, which is distributed in three bedrooms, two bathrooms, living room, kitchen and dining room. The houses are made of PVC profiles which are assembled locally, and then filled with concrete, steel and iron girders. The walls are self-extinguishing in case of a fire, and resist an attack with nine-millimeter ammunition virtually unscathed. The German Technical Inspection Association (TÜV) Rheinland certified in August 2009 that the PVC used was free of carcinogenic substances.

== See also ==
- Futuro
