= Bolivarian missions =

Venezuelan social programs enacted by Hugo Chávez and Nicolás Maduro

The Bolivarian missions are a series of over thirty social programs implemented under the administration of former Venezuelan president Hugo Chávez and continued by Chávez's successor, Nicolás Maduro. The programs focus on helping the most disadvantaged social sectors and guaranteeing essential rights such as health, education and food. The created missions include Mission Robinson (literacy), Mission Barrio Adentro (free medical coverage), and Mission Mercal (affordable food).

Using increasing oil prices of the early 2000s and funds not seen in Venezuela since the 1980s, Chávez created the "Bolivarian missions" in 2003, which were initially short-term projects dedicated to alleviating the largest socioeconomic problems facing Venezuela at the time. After enjoying political success, Chávez made the missions his central priority for his administration, directly overseeing their operations and increasing funding during electoral campaigns.

The development and promotion of economic resources, originating from the state-owned Petróleos de Venezuela (PDVSA), generated a political floor for the governmental management of that time, but that "as the years went by, many social missions lost their social perspective and focused their axis of action on political activities" characterized by discretionality and information opacity.

== Types ==
=== Education ===
- Mission Robinson (launched July 2003) – uses volunteers to teach reading, writing, and arithmetic to Venezuelan adults.
- Mission Ribas (launched November 2003) – provides remedial high school level classes to Venezuelan high school dropouts; named after independence hero José Félix Ribas. In 2004, about 600,000 students were enrolled in this night school programme, and paid a small stipend. They were taught grammar, geography and a second language.
- Mission Sucre (launched in late 2003) – provides free and ongoing higher education courses to adult Venezuelans.

=== Electoral ===
- Mission Florentino – was organized by Hugo Chávez to promote the option "No" in the Venezuelan recall referendum of 2004. The organizational centers of the Mission were named "Comando Maisanta" and were the ideological central headquarters for those who wished to keep Chávez as the President of Venezuela for the remainder of his presidential period.

=== Food and nutrition ===
- Mission Mercal – seeks to provide access to high-quality produce, grains, dairy, and meat at discounted prices. Seeks to provide Venezuela's poor increased access to nutritious, safe, and organic locally- and nationally grown foodstuffs. It also seeks to increase Venezuela's food sovereignty. Its concrete results, however, are highly debatable, as in 2007 the country is heavily more dependent on imported foodstuffs than it was in 1997, and has been facing chronic shortages in several basic supplies: milk, edible oils, sugar, cereals, eggs, and others.

=== Healthcare ===
- Mission Barrio Adentro ("Mission Inside the Neighborhood") – a series of initiatives (deployed in three distinct stages) to provide comprehensive and community health care (at both the primary (Consultorios y Clínicas Populares or popular clinics) and secondary (hospital) levels, in addition to preventive medical counsel to Venezuela's medically under-served and impoverished barrios.
- Mission Nevado – Named after the dog of Simón Bolívar, this program provides free medical services to pets (such as dogs) and their owners and handlers, most especially animals that have been rescued from torture and suffering from mistreatment from owners.

=== Housing ===
- Mission Hábitat – has as its goal the construction of new housing units for the poor. The program also seeks to develop agreeable and integrated housing zones that make available a full range of social services – from education to healthcare – which likens its vision to that of new urbanism.
- Great Mission Housing Venezuela – is the latest expansion of the housing missions since 2011.
- Great Mission New Neighborhood, Tricolor Neighborhood – conducts house rehabilitation projects since 2009.

=== Identification ===
- Mission Identidad – provides Venezuelan national identity cards to facilitate access to the social services provided by other Missions.

=== Indigenous rights ===
- Mission Guaicaipuro (launched October 2003) – carried out by the Venezuelan Ministry of Environment and Natural Resources, this program seeks to restore communal land titles and human rights to Venezuela's numerous indigenous communities, in addition to defending their rights against resource and financial speculation.

=== Land reform ===
- Mission Zamora – an integrated land reform and land redistribution program in Venezuela. Several large landed estates and factories have been, or are in the process of being expropriated to stimulate the agricultural sector, create more economic activity and to redistribute wealth to the poor.

=== Rural development ===
- Mission Vuelta al Campo ("Return to the Countryside"; announced mid– 2005) – seeks to encourage impoverished and unemployed urban Venezuelans to willingly return to the countryside.
- Mission Árbol (Mission Tree, announced June 2006) – seeks to recover Venezuelan forests and to involve the rural population to stop harm to forests through from slash/burn practices by promoting more sustainable agriculture, such as growing coffee or cocoa. The projects aim to achieve this through self-organization of the local populations.

=== Science ===
- Mission Ciencia ("Mission Science" launched February 2006) – includes a project to train 400,000 people in open source software, and scholarships for graduate studies and the creation of laboratories in different universities.

=== Socioeconomic transformation ===
- Mission Vuelvan Caras ("Mission Turn Faces") – has as its objective the transformation of the present Venezuelan economy to one that is oriented towards social, rather than fiscal and remunerative, goals. It seeks to facilitate increased involvement of ordinary citizens in programs of endogenous and sustainable social development, emphasizing in particular the involvement of traditionally marginalized or excluded Venezuelan social and economic sectors, including those participating in Venezuela's significant "informal" economy. The mission's ultimate goal, according to Hugo Chávez, is to foster an economy that brings "a quality and dignified life for all". In January 2006, Chávez declared that, after fulfilling the first stage of the mission, the goal of the second stage will be to turn every "endogenous nuclei of development" into "military nuclei of resistance against American imperialism" as part of a continuous program to create "citizen militias".

=== Civilian militia ===
- Mission Miranda – establishes a Venezuelan military reserve composed of civilians who could participate in the defense of the Venezuelan territory, in the legacy of the militias during the Spanish colonial period and the struggle for independence.

=== Culture ===
- Mission Música – helps the development of music by encouraging young people to take up music-related careers as well as to revive traditional Venezuelan folk music.

== International assistance ==
=== Cuba ===
Many of these programs involve importing expertise from abroad; Venezuela is providing Cuba with 53,000 barrels (8,000 m^{3}) of below-market-rate oil a day in exchange for the service of thousands of physicians, teachers, sports trainers, and other skilled professionals.

In February 2010 seven Cuban doctors who defected to the US introduced an indictment against the governments of Cuba and Venezuela and the oil company PDVSA for what they considered was a conspiracy to force them to work under conditions of "modern slaves" as payment for the Cuban government' debt. In 2014, it was reported by Miami NGO, Solidarity Without Borders, that at least 700 Cuban medical personnel had left Venezuela in the past year and that up to hundreds of Cuban personnel had asked for advice on how to escape from Venezuela weekly. Solidarity Without Borders also stated that Cuban personnel cannot refuse to work, cannot express complaints and suffer with blackmail from threats against their family in Cuba.

== Impact ==
The development and promotion of economic resources, originating from the state-owned Petróleos de Venezuela (PDVSA), generated a political floor for the governmental management of that time, but that "as the years went by, many social missions lost their social perspective and focused their axis of action on political activities" characterized by discretionality and information opacity.

The Bolivarian missions have been praised for their effect on poverty, education and health, and are described as "ways to combat extreme forms of exclusion" and "the mainstay of progress in the fight against poverty."

On the other hand, the Chávez government overspent on social spending without saving enough for economic distress, which Venezuela experienced shortly before and after Hugo Chávez's death and during the economic policy of the Nicolás Maduro government. Poverty, inflation and shortages then began to increase.

A multi-university study in 2015 questioned the effectiveness of the Bolivarian missions, showing that only 10% of Venezuelans studied benefited from the missions. Of that 10%, almost half were not affected from poverty. According to El Universal, experts stated that the missions actually worsened economic conditions in the country.

=== Health care ===
Mission Barrio Adentro, one of the flagship Bolivarian Missions of the widest social impact, drew praise from the Latin American branch of the World Health Organization and UNICEF.

Barrio Adentro, however, has been criticized for poor working conditions of Cuban workers, funding irregularities, and an estimated 80% of Barrio Adentro establishments abandoned with some structures filled with trash or becoming unintentional shelters for the homeless.

The infant mortality rate went down 5.9% between 1999 and 2013. The Gini coefficient fell from 47.8 in 1999 to 44.8 in 2006. The government earmarked 44.6% of the 2007 budget for social investment, with 1999–2007 averaging 12.8% of GDP.

=== Poverty ===
During the Chávez's presidency, poverty fell from 49.4% in 1999 to 30.2% in 2006 and extreme poverty went down from 21.7% to 9.9% in the same period according to the United Nations Economic Commission for Latin America and the Caribbean (ECLAC). However, the ECLAC showed a nearly 7% jump in poverty in 2013, from 25.4% in 2012 increasing to 32.1% in 2013.

In a multi-university study by the Andrés Bello Catholic University (UCAB), the Central University of Venezuela (UCV) and the Simon Bolivar University (USB), a comparison to the Venezuelan government's National Statistics Institute (INE) showed that overall poverty trends eventually reversed and increased between 1999 and 2015, rising from approximately 45% in 1999 to 48.4% in 2015 according to the study performed by universities. Months later, the same universities found that 73% of Venezuelan households lived in poverty, with poverty increasing over 24% in about one year.

== Criticism ==
Several scandals affected the Plan Bolívar 2000 due to allegations against generals involved in the plan, stating that significant amounts of money had been diverted. The International Monetary Fund has criticized these practices of selling "discounted" oil, criticisms that were rejected by Venezuela. In February 2010, an incident was recorded in which seven Cuban doctors defected to the United States and accused the governments of Cuba, Venezuela, and the state company PDVSA of forcing them to work "as modern slaves" as payment of Cuba's public debt. The NGO Solidaridad Sin Fronteras reported from Miami that around 700 Cuban doctors left Venezuela in 2013 due to the deteriorating economic situation. The NGO also stated that Cuban personnel "cannot refuse to work or complain". The Miami Herald published an article explaining that Cuban doctors were required to meet a daily patient quota and, if they failed, were threatened with withheld wages, transfers, and, in extreme cases, forced repatriation to Cuba. To compensate for the lack of patients, doctors falsified documents, discarding anesthesia, dental molds, and other supplies to justify the figures.

=== Corruption allegations ===
On 25 January 2017, state workers of *Misión Vivienda* and government supporters gathered in front of the Ministry of Housing and Habitat headquarters in Barquisimeto to protest the illegal dismissal of their workers and the failure to complete 161 houses in Carora, Torres municipality of Lara state, demanding a response. The president of the Lara State Construction Industry Union, Pedro Peña, declared that a shell corporation, called Incorsa, left more than 80 workers without severance pay. The project began in 2013 and was halted in 2014, when the workers demanded labor benefits that were legally due. The site's general foreman, Juan Gómez, stated there were already suspicions about the integrity of the project, as construction materials were rarely delivered, with the exception of sand and cement.

For the 2016 annual report, Arias Cárdenas announced that they had executed 151,260 homes. In one interview he said 47,396, in another he claimed 120,000, and that he was close to reaching his administration's goal of 200,000 homes for the region. There is a deficit of 400,000 homes in the state for every Zulia resident to have a house.

— José Contreras, president of the CIDEZ Housing Commission

In 2017, the president of the Zulia State Engineers' Center (CIDEZ), Marcelo Monnot, denounced inconsistencies between the figures provided by the national government regarding investment in mission projects and estimated a deficit of US$76 billion, demanding clarification on its destination. The president of the CIDEZ Housing Commission, José Contreras, also pointed out inconsistencies in the figures provided by governor Francisco Arias Cárdenas.

The investigative portal Armando.Info reported that Colombian businessman Alex Saab received US$159 million from the Venezuelan government to import housing materials between 2012 and 2013, but only US$3 million worth of products were delivered.

=== Concerns about sustainability ===
The sustainability of the missions has been a subject of ongoing debate. These doubts arose especially in their early years and after the death of Hugo Chávez. The main criticism of Venezuela is that the sustainability of the missions fundamentally depends on oil prices and exports. The American magazine Foreign Policy described Venezuela "as a case of Dutch disease, due to the large increase in revenues from oil sales and their subsequent waste to satisfy voters". The Chávez government acknowledged spending more on social programs than it should have, without saving enough money to face future economic shocks, which Venezuela experienced shortly after Chávez's death and during the economic policies of Nicolás Maduro's government, marked by the economic crisis, rising inflation, and shortages.

As a result of Chávez's policies, the durability of the Bolivarian missions was tested shortly before and after his death, when poverty and inflation increased and widespread shortages occurred, with these effects worsening particularly during Nicolás Maduro’s presidency. In 2014, Venezuela entered economic recession. Poverty estimates made by the United Nations Economic Commission for Latin America and the Caribbean (ECLAC) and Luis Pedro España, a sociologist at Andrés Bello Catholic University, show a considerable increase in poverty. ECLAC recorded a poverty rate of 32% for 2013, while Pedro España estimated an increase to 48% in 2015, with a projected poverty rate of 70% by the end of 2015. According to the Venezuelan NGO Provea, by the end of 2015, there would be as many Venezuelans living in poverty as in 2000, reversing the poverty reduction progress made during Hugo Chávez's government.

=== Deficiencies in Misión Vivienda ===
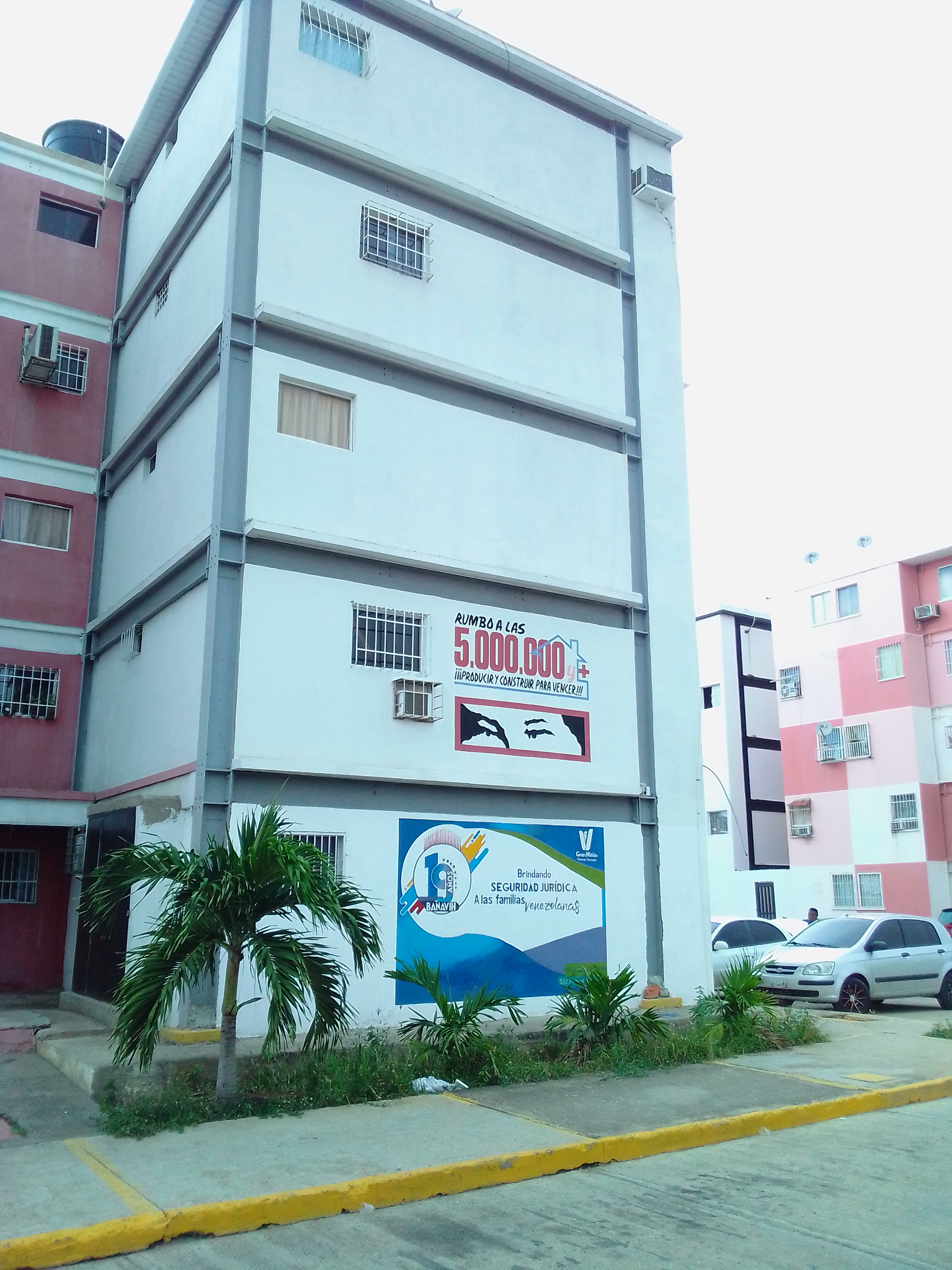
*Misión Vivienda* building

By 2013, Enzo Betancourt, president of the College of Engineers of Venezuela, warned about the deterioration of *Misión Vivienda*'s infrastructure, stating that the College had constantly raised concerns with government authorities. Betancourt cited as an example the situation of the housing complex of Ciudad Caribia, where by 2012 several complaints had been received about collapsed walls, unsupported plasterwork, and both walls and slabs with cracks. He said that following these complaints he had warned that all stages that needed to be considered in housing construction should be fulfilled in the short term, that despite the rush with which the executive carried out the project, professional and technical factors had to be taken into account for it to be viable and of optimal quality, and that all *Misión Vivienda* works should have a timeline of activities to properly execute the projects.

In 2016, Enzo Betancourt dismissed as false the figures provided by Nicolás Maduro regarding the delivery of new homes, declaring that by that date construction works had been paralyzed for three months. He stated that among the figures were included the so-called Barrio Nuevo Barrio Tricolor, existing shacks in neighborhoods that were rebuilt, decorated, and falsely presented as new housing.

On 30 August 2017, cracks in a *Misión Vivienda* building in Tanaguarenas, Vargas state, widened after a 4.5 magnitude earthquake; residents expressed fear that the damage could cause the structures to collapse.

== Sustainability of missions ==
From the beginning of the Bolivarian missions and past Chávez's death, the sustainability of the missions was questioned. The Bolivarian government's overdependence on oil funds for large populist policies led to overspending on social programs and strict government policies created difficulties for Venezuela's import reliant businesses. Foreign Policy described Chávez's Venezuela as "one of the worst cases of the Dutch disease in the world" due to the Bolivarian government's large dependence on oil sales and its lavish spending to please voters.

Focus on the missions was increased during political campaigns in Venezuela, with Chávez often overspending to fund their popularity. Following elections, government interest in the missions would then decline and their effectiveness would be negatively affected. The lack of institutional organization–many missions had existing government services that only increased costs–and the "revolutionary" approach which often caused inefficient improvisation would eventually jeopardize the sustainability of the missions.

As a result of Chávez's policies, the durability of Bolivarian missions was put to the test shortly before and after Chávez's death, when poverty increased, inflation rose and widespread shortages in Venezuela occurred, with such effects growing especially into the presidency of Nicolas Maduro. In 2014, Venezuela entered an economic recession. Estimates of poverty by the United Nations Economic Commission for Latin America and the Caribbean (ECLAC) and Luis Pedro España, a sociologist at the Universidad Católica Andrés Bello, show an increase in poverty. ECLAC showed a 2013 poverty rate of 32% while Pedro España calculated a 2015 rate of 48% with a poverty rate of 70% possible by the end of 2015. According to Venezuelan NGO PROVEA, by the end of 2015, there would be the same number of Venezuelans living in poverty as there was in 2000, reversing the advancements against poverty by Hugo Chávez.
