= Mission Florentino =

Logo of the Mission Florentino/Comando Maisanta

Mission Florentino was a Bolivarian mission organized by the government of Venezuelan President, Hugo Chávez, to coordinate the populace to vote "No" in the Venezuelan recall referendum of 2004 to keep him in office. The organizational centers of the Mission were named Comando Maisanta, as the ideological central headquarters (election brigades) for those who wished to keep Chávez as the President of Venezuela for the remainder of his presidential term.

== Mission ==
The mission's name was inspired from a poem by Alberto Arvelo Torrealba entitled "Florentino y el Diablo (Florentino and the Devil)" in which a singer, Florentino, is tempted by the Devil to join him. Chávez claimed that reading the poem reminded him of the political situation in Venezuela at the time and encouraged his supporters to follow the example of Florentino fighting the Devil (those who were going to vote in favor of removing him from office). The name of the "Comandos" came from the Caudillo Pedro Pérez Delgado, great-grandfather of Chávez and nicknamed "Maisanta", who fought as a guerrilla fighter against Juan Vicente Gómez for control of the country during the early years of the 20th century.

In June 2004, Chávez announced that the campaign conducted by the Mission Florentino for the referendum would bear the name of the Battle of Santa Inés.

== Members and positions ==
- Chief of the "Comando": Hugo Chávez (President of Venezuela)
- Logistic: Diosdado Cabello (former president for a few hours between 12 and 13 April 2002 and current Governor of Miranda State)
- Organization: William Lara (former president of the Venezuelan National Assembly and member of Parliament)
- Communication Strategy: Jesse Chacón (Communication and Information Minister)
- Technology: Nelson Merentes (Minister for Social Economy)
- Electoral Missions: Rafael Ramírez (Minister of Energy and Oil and PDVSA President)
- International Liaison: Samuel Moncada (historian)
- Events and Image: Mari Pili Hernández (journalist)
- Ideology: William Izarra (founder and official ideologist of MVR)
- Patrols: Tania D'Amelio (member of Parliament)
- Liaisons: Simón Pestana (candidate for mayor of Baruta)
- Secretary: Haiman El Troudi (director of Presidential Relations)
