= Mission Miranda =

Mission Miranda is one of the Bolivarian Missions (a series of anti-poverty and social welfare programs) implemented by late Venezuelan president Hugo Chávez. The program establishes a Venezuelan military reserve composed of ordinary Venezuelan citizens given light arms to defend the territory in the case of an invasion. Arms purchases intended to supply the program included the acquisition of 100,000 Russian AK-103 rifles which has provoked criticism from the U.S. and Colombian government over what seemed to be an unnecessary increase of weapon stocks.

Misión Miranda, as it is called in Spanish, was named in remembrance of Francisco de Miranda, a Venezuelan independence leader.
