= Plan Bolívar 2000 =

First Bolivarian mission

Plan Bolívar 2000 (launched 27 February 1999 and cancelled in 2002) was the first of the Bolivarian Missions enacted under administration of Venezuelan President Hugo Chávez. According to the United States Department of State, Chávez wanted to "send the message that the military was not a force of popular repression, but rather a force for development and security". The State Department also commented that this happened "only 23 days after his inauguration" and that he wanted to show his closest supporters "that he had not forgotten them". The plan involved around 40,000 Venezuelan soldiers engaged in door-to-door anti-poverty activities, including mass vaccinations, food distribution in slum areas, and education. The program also transported thousands of poor and ill Venezuelans at cost by military cargo planes and helicopters to seek employment and medical care. About US$144 million were approved for the project.

== Corruption ==
In 2001, several scandals affected the program as allegations of corruption were formulated against Generals involved in the plan, arguing that significant amounts of money had been diverted.

General Victor Cruz Weffer, in charge of the program denied the wrongdoing but he was fired by Chávez and the mission was cancelled in 2002. Cruz Weffer was not charged with any crime at the time, but was arrested in 2018 to stand trial with charges of illicit enrichment related to accounts offshore.
