= Ciudad Caribia =

- City
- Location within Venezuela
- Coordinates: 10°32′N 67°2′W
- Country: Venezuela
- State: Vargas
- Founded: 2006

Population (2014)
  - Total: 10,000

Ciudad Caribia is a planned community in Venezuela, located to the west of Caracas.

== Community ==
The city has kindergartens and schools, an adult education programme, football and basketball pitches, a government-run health centre, a government-subsidised bakery and supermarket, and even an industrial area, which is yet to be developed fully. This is in stark difference to the majority of slums in the hills that surround Caracas, where people live in precarious shacks and have long commutes to work.

The community has been criticized for the alteration of green spaces, cost overruns, that some houses could be unstable or have inadequate materials or lack of adequate services, insecurity and difficulty to access a mountainous area.

== History ==
The idea for a new city was developed by President Hugo Chávez in 2006, with the site chosen by Chávez following a malfunction that forced the helicopter he was travelling in to land in the area. It was named after the native Carib people.

The city is planned to have 20,000 residential units and the total population is expected to be over 100,000. Construction started in 2006, although only 2,000 homes had been built by 2013 and the population was 10,000 in 2014. Several dwellings were given to Venezuelan citizens made homeless by flooding in November 2010.

Ciudad Caribia was one of the few places in Venezuela where support for the post-Chávez socialist government remained strong.
