= Intiguttu =

Intiguttu may refer to:

- Intiguttu (1958 film), a 1958 Telugu film starring N. T. Rama Rao
- Intiguttu (1984 film), a 1984 Telugu film starring Chiranjeevi
