= Mission Mercal =

Venezuelan government food distribution and subsidy program

Mission Mercal, officially launched on 24 April 2003 is a Bolivarian Mission established in Venezuela under the government of Hugo Chávez. The Mission involves a state-run company called Mercados de Alimentos, C.A. (MERCAL), which provides subsidised food and basic goods through a nationwide chain of stores.

Mission Mercal stores and cooperatives are mostly located in impoverished areas and sell generic-branded foods at discounts as great as 50%. While the company is heavily funded by the government, the goal was to become self-sufficient by replacing food imports with products from local farmers, small businesses, and cooperatives (many of whom have received microcredits from Mercal).

Since at least 2014, customers have said that there is a lack of products in Mercal stores and that items available at these stores change constantly. Some customers complained about rationing being enforced at Mercal stores due to the lack of products.

== History ==
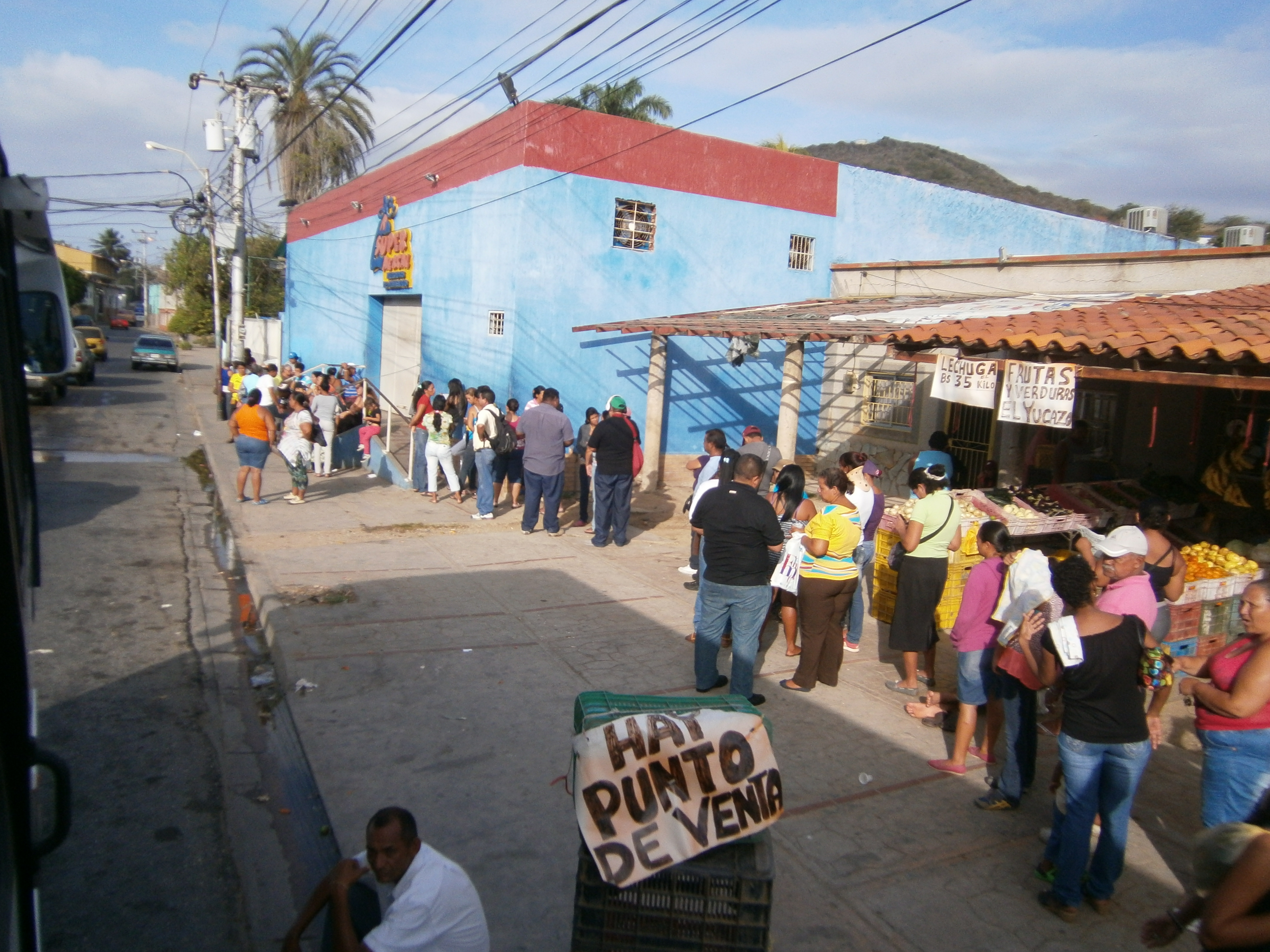
Shoppers waiting in line at a Mercal store.

On 25 April 2003 broadcast of the television show Aló Presidente, Chávez expressed his outrage at Venezuela's lack of food sovereignty, and Mission Mercal was officially launched on 24 April.

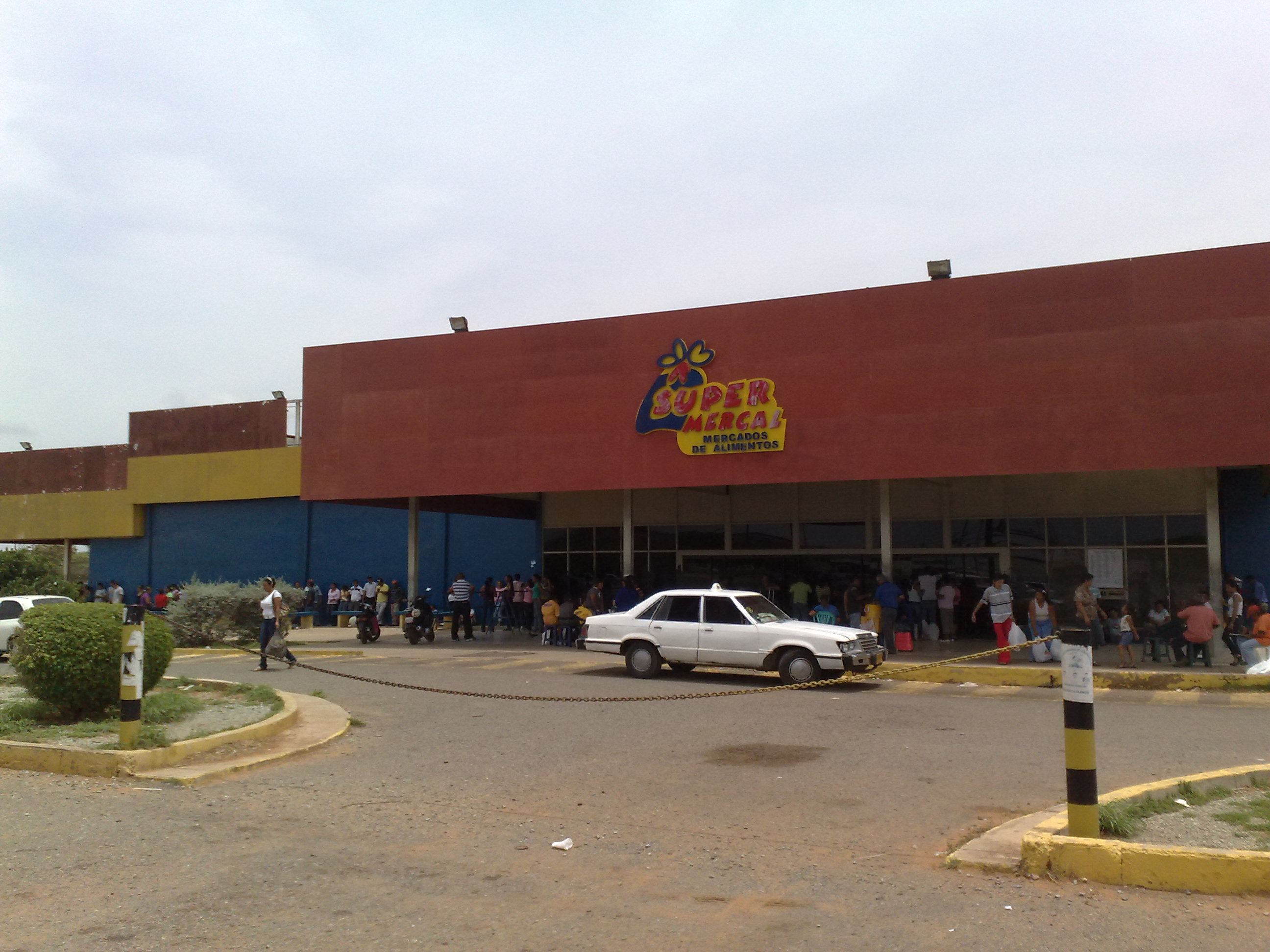
Súper Mercal store in Judibana, Venezuela.

In 2006 some 11.36 million Venezuelans benefited from Mercal food programs on a regular basis. At least 14,208 Mission Mercal food distribution sites were spread throughout Venezuela, and 4,543 metric tons of food distributed each day.

In 2010 Mercal was reported as having 16,600 outlets, "ranging from street-corner shops to huge warehouse stores," in addition to 6000 soup kitchens. Mercal employs 85,000 workers.

== Food and discounts offered ==
Victuals offered by Mission Mercal include everything from meat and dairy (including powdered milk and cheese), to fresh produce, preserved foodstuffs, grains and cereals, fruits, vegetable oils, and mineral salts. These goods are offered in Mercal-affiliated establishments at discounts averaging between 25% and 50%.

== Shortages ==
Since at least 2014, shortages have affected Mercal stores. Customers have waited in long lines for discounted products and there has been a lack of products in Mercal stores and that items available at the stores change constantly. Customers also complained about rationing being enforced at Mercal stores due to the lack of products. In some cases, protests have occurred due to the shortages in stores.

== See also ==
- PDVAL
- Economic policy of the Hugo Chávez government
