= Victor Cruz Weffer =

- Allegiance: Venezuela
- Branch: Venezuelan Army

Victor Cruz Weffer served as commander-in-chief of the Venezuelan army from July 2001 until December 2001, and was dismissed on corruption charges.

== Plan Bolívar ==
Cruz Weffer was the army commander in charge of the Plan Bolívar 2000, the first of the "Bolivarian missions" (social programs) of President Hugo Chávez administration. Due to a series of corruption allegations about Plan Bolívar, Chávez fired Cruz Weffer in 2001. The mission was cancelled in 2002. Cruz Weffer was not charged with any crimes at the time.

== Corruption charges ==
In 2002 an investigation began; one month before Weffer acquired shares in the Seychelles company Univers Investments Ltd in 2007, public prosecutors charged him with illicit enrichment, failing to disclose financial interests and sending hundreds of thousands of dollars to overseas bank accounts. Univers Investments used bearer shares, which can be used to obscure the ownership of offshore investments. The company of Venezuela's ex-commander-in-chief of the Armed Forces was noted as inactive in January 2011. In 2011 Weffer was acquitted; an appeal is ongoing. In April 2016, he was named in the Panama Papers, leaked documents related to offshore banking. On March 21 2018, Cruz Weffer was arrested in the Simón Bolívar International Airport due to his involvement in the Panama Papers leak.
