= Mission Vuelta al Campo =

Mission Vuelta al Campo ("Return to the Countryside"; implementation announced in mid-2005) is one of the Bolivarian Missions (a series of anti-poverty and social welfare programs) implemented by Venezuelan president Hugo Chávez. Mission Vuelta al Campo seeks to encourage impoverished and unemployed urban Venezuelans to willingly return to the countryside.

Prior to the Chávez administration, Venezuela's rural areas have seen substantial economic disinvestment, depopulation, and abandonment ever since oil wealth discoveries and extraction commenced in the early 20th century; as a consequence Venezuela now has an urbanization rate of more than 85% (far higher than the average for both Latin America and the Third World and is, despite its vast tracts of highly fertile soil and arable land, a net food importer. The Ley de Tierras — "Law of the Lands" — was passed by presidential decree in November 2001; it included the creation of a Plan Zamora to implement land reforms, including redistribution, in Venezuelan agriculture. Underutilized or unused private corporate and agricultural estates would now be subject to expropriation after fair-market compensation was paid to the owners. Inheritable, inalienable, and at times communal land grants were also made to small farmers and farmer's collectives. The rationale given for this program was that it would provide incentives for the eventual and gradual repopulation of the countryside and provide "food security" for the country by lessening the present dependence on foreign imports. There are three types of land that may be distributed under the program:

1. government land,
2. land that is claimed by private owners, but whose claims the government disputes,
3. and underutilized private land.

To date, the Chávez government has only distributed the first two types of land.

Mission Vuelta al Campo fits into this context by seeking to facilitate the willing migration of urban residents back to the countryside in order to receive the benefits of these redistributions. The Chávez government desires that, with increased small-scale farming and ranching by formerly poor, mostly slum-dwelling Venezuelans, both increased economic opportunities of the poor as well as the food sovereignty of Venezuela may be secured.
