= Mission Zamora =

Mission Zamora is an integrated land reform and land redistribution program in Venezuela, created in law by the Ley de Tierras ("Law of Land"), part of a package of 49 decrees made by Hugo Chávez in November 2001. The plan is named in honor of Ezequiel Zamora, a 19th-century Venezuelan peasant leader.

== Background ==
Venezuela's rural areas have seen substantial economic disinvestment, governmental neglect, depopulation, and abandonment ever since oil wealth was discovered in the early 20th century; as a consequence Venezuela now has an urbanization rate of more than 85%—among the highest in Latin America—and is, despite its vast tracts of highly fertile soil and arable land, a net food importer. The Ley de Tierras—"Law of the Lands"—was passed by presidential decree in November 2001; it included the creation of Plan Zamora to implement land reforms, including redistribution, in Venezuelan agriculture. The plan was created for several pressing reasons: to stimulate the agricultural sector in Venezuela in order to provide food security to the country (the only net food importer in Latin America) and more economic activity, to break up the concentrated economic power of the latifundios (75–80% of land owned by 5% of landowners, 2% owned 60% of farmland; 60% of agricultors do not possess any land) and redistribute wealth to the poor in Venezuela, and to discourage urbanization, which creates heavy burdens on city services in the slums of Caracas and other Venezuelan cities.

Underutilized or unused private corporate and agricultural estates would now be subject to expropriation after "fair-market" compensation was paid to the owners. Inheritable, inalienable, and at times communal land grants were also gifted to small farmers and farmer's collectives. The rationale given for this program was that it would provide incentives for the eventual and gradual repopulation of the countryside and provide "food security" for the country by lessening the present dependence on foreign imports. There are three types of land that may be distributed under the program:

1. government land,
2. land that is claimed by private owners, but whose claims the government disputes (including centennially inherited land)
3. and underutilized private land (including second homes, and investment property).

To date, the Chávez government has only distributed the first two types of land.

== Legal specifications ==
There are three components to the Plan's legal specifications:

1. A legal limit (a capped limit) on the size of landholdings, which varies based on conditions between 1 and 50 km^{2}.
2. A tax on unused land holdings.
3. A program for distribution of government and expropriated (with compensation) unused private lands.

Venezuelan citizens between the age of 18 and 25 or who head a family may petition to benefit from the Plan's land redistribution programs. The Plan's participants are first granted a piece of land to homestead and cultivate; if they cultivate it continuously for three years, they are then given official title to the land. This government-recognized title may then be inherited by the participants' relations, but its sale is legally proscribed.

== Implementation ==
Three institutions were created to carry out the land distribution program: the Instituto Nacional de Tierras ("National Land Institute"), which oversees land tenancy; the Instituto Nacional de Desarrollo Rural ("National Rural Development Institute"), which oversees aid to farmers, including technical expertise and equipment, and the Corporación de Abastecimiento y Servicios Agrícolas ("Agricultural Corporation of Supplies and Services"), to help with marketing. By the end of 2003, 60,000 families had received temporary title to a total of 55,000 km^{2} of land under this plan.

== Controversy ==
External videos
- The Bolivarian National Guard and colectivo members intimidating a family over their property while attempting to plant weapons. on YouTube

The taking of private land proved controversial among Venezuelan land owners since the introduction of The Land Law of 2001, with one Chávez ally, former governor of Cojedes state Jhonny Yanez Rangel stating during a speech that "private property … is a right, but not absolute", while also placing emphasis on the importance of "the collective interest". The military was often involved in land takeovers, with some allegations of the Bolivarian National Guard violently taking land from families. In 2010, Venezuela tied with Chad and Zimbabwe for 2nd worst property rights in the world according to the International Property Rights Index from Americans for Tax Reform, a conservative U.S. advocacy group. By 2014, the International Property Rights Index rated Venezuela as having the worst property rights in the world.

== See also ==
- Urban Land Committees
