= Inti Muñoz Santini =

Mexican politician

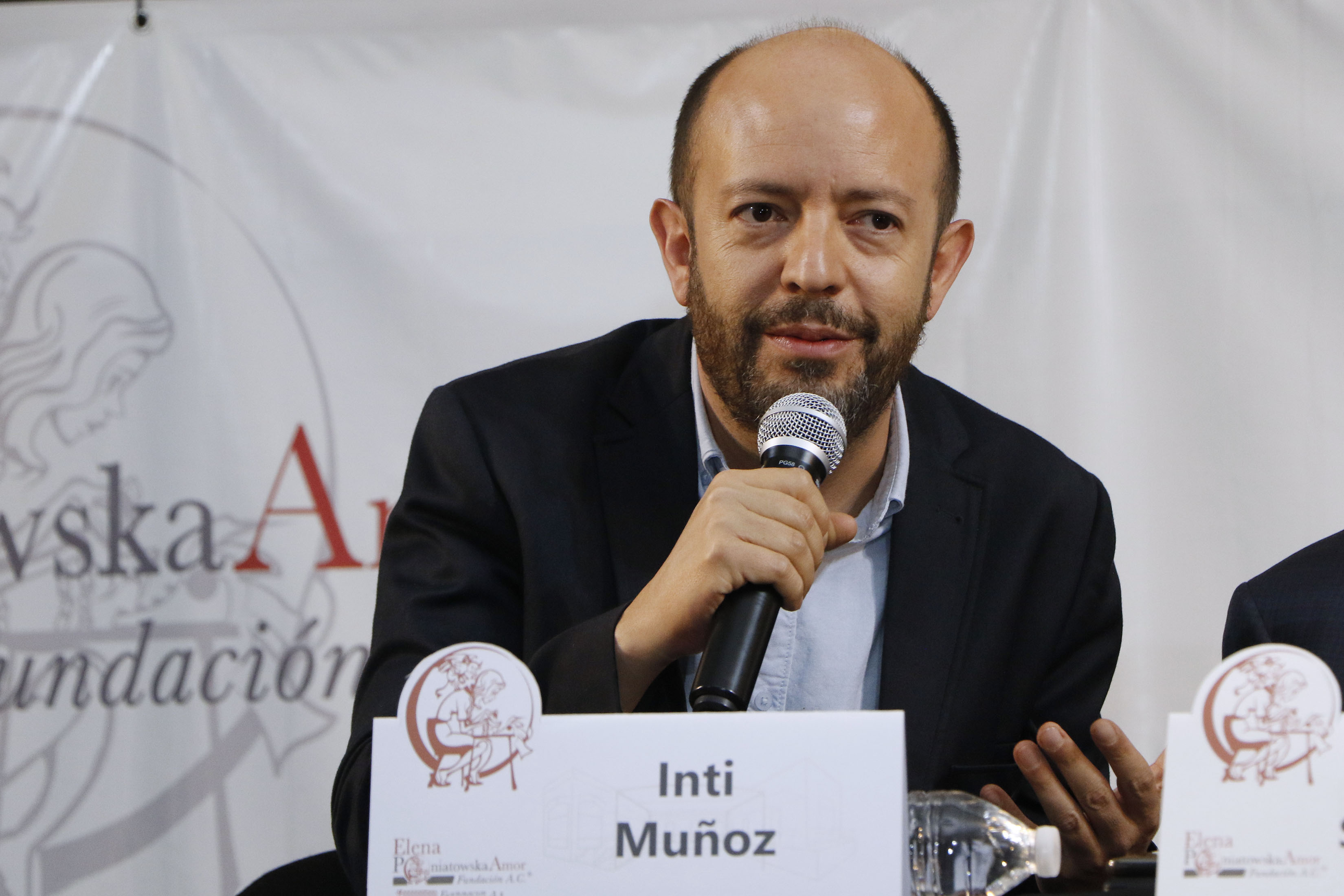
- Born: 4 January 1974 (age 52); Chihuahua, Chihuahua, Mexico
- Occupation: Politician
- Political party: PRD

Inti Muñoz Santini (born 4 January 1974) is a Mexican politician affiliated with the Party of the Democratic Revolution (PRD).

In the 2003 mid-terms he was elected to the Chamber of Deputies to serve as a PRD plurinominal deputy during the 59th session of Congress.
