= Mission Vuelvan Caras =

Vuelvan Caras (Spanish for "About Face", in the sense of turning to face in another direction), is one of the Bolivarian Missions, a series of anti-poverty and social welfare programs implemented by Hugo Chávez, Ex President of Venezuela. It has as its objective the transformation of the present Venezuelan economy to one that is oriented towards social, rather than fiscal and remunerative, goals. It seeks to facilitate increased involvement of ordinary citizens in programs of endogenous and sustainable social development, emphasizing in particular the involvement of traditionally marginalized or excluded Venezuelan social and economic sectors, including those participating in Venezuela's significant "informal" economy. The mission's ultimate goal, according to Hugo Chávez, is to foster an economy that brings "a quality and dignified life for all."
