= Mission Identidad =

Mission Identidad is one of the Bolivarian Missions implemented by Venezuelan president Hugo Chávez. This program provides Venezuelan national identity cards to facilitate access to the social services provided by the other Missions.

Misión Identidad mainly seeks to ease the process of obtaining an ID card. Venezuela has had a national system of ID cards since the 1940s, and these ID documents need to be renewed every 10 years. Foreigners living in the country also need to possess an ID; this foreigner's ID would be equivalent to the U.S. alien registration card (or green card). In Venezuela, under this Mission, it is absolutely forbidden to ask any money for this document, and foreigners who comply with all the legal requirements can legally obtain one. Possession of this document is required before one can vote in Venezuelan elections.

== Controversy ==
In a study by the Center for a Secure Free Society (SFS), at least 173 people from the Middle East were caught with Venezuelan documentation. The SFS believes that the documentation was provided by the Venezuelan government through Mission Identidad, stating that 70% of the people came from Iran, Lebanon and Syria "and had some connection with Hezbollah". The majority allegedly had Venezuelan passports, IDs, visas and in some cases, even Venezuelan birth certificates. One of the key figures of the Venezuelan government noted in the SFS report was the Lebanese born former Minister of the Interior, Tarek El Aissami, who allegedly "developed a sophisticated financial network and multi-level networks as a criminal-terrorist pipeline to bring Islamic militants to Venezuela and neighboring countries, and to send illicit funds from Latin America to the Middle East".
