= Alejandro José Suárez Luzardo =

Venezuelan politician and lawyer (born 1965)

Alejandro José Suárez Luzardo (born 1965 in Caracas) is a Venezuelan politician and lawyer.

He is member of a party named Movimiento Sentir Nacional.

He took part in the 2006 Venezuelan presidential election.
