= Mission Habitat =

Misión Hábitat ("Mission Habitat") is a Venezuelan Bolivarian Mission aims to construct of thousands of new housing units for the poor. The program also seeks to develop agreeable and integrated housing zones that make available a full range of social services — from education to healthcare — which likens its vision to that of New Urbanism.

According to Venezuela's El Universal, Chávez promised to build 150,000 houses in 2006. In the first half of the year, 24% of the goal (35,000 houses) was fulfilled. The project was continued by the Great Mission Housing Venezuela launched in 2011. El Universal (July 31, 2006). In 2013, the Venezuelan government completed nearly 50% of projected homes and in 2014 completed 30% of its target.

== See also ==
- Petrocasa
