= Mission Barrio Adentro =

Venezuelan social welfare program

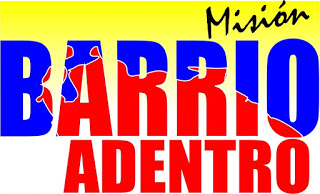
Official logo since 2004

Mission Barrio Adentro (English: Mission Into the Neighborhood) is a Venezuelan social welfare program established by the President Hugo Chávez. Through Misión Barrio Adentro, Cuban doctors served Venezuelan communities where Venezuela's mostly white medical staff refused to work.

Of a planned 8,500 Barrio Adentro I centers, 2,708 had been built by May 2007, using an investment of around US$126 million, with a further 3,284 under construction.

In Caracas, Mission Barrio Adentro I and II centers in 32 parishes were the subject of constant complaints regarding performance, even after receiving 1.492 million bolívares from the government. As of December 2014, it was estimated that 80% of Barrio Adentro establishments were abandoned in Venezuela, with the majority of Cuban medical personnel leaving the country.

By the end of 2015, the Bolivarian government reported that one in three of Venezuelan patients admitted to public health facilities that year died. In October 2016, the Miami Herald reported that hundreds of doctors were being recalled by the Cuban government, allegedly due to a lack of payments by Venezuela.

== History ==
When Hugo Chávez was elected president in 1998, 70% of Venezuelans lacked regular access to health care, and over 4 million children and adolescents experienced malnutrition. This situation did not meaningfully improve during the early years of the Chávez presidency.

Through Misión Barrio Adentro, Cuban doctors served Venezuelan communities where Venezuela's mostly white medical staff refused to work. In 2003, Caracas's pro-Chávez mayor proposed the Barrio Adentro program to bring free local health care to poor areas in Libertador. The Venezuelan Medical Federation instructed its members to boycott the program. The mayor sought assistance from the Cuban embassy, and the Barrio Adentro program was launched in April 2003 with 58 Cuban doctors. By December 2003, the program had been expanded on a national scope, and over 10,000 Cuban medical professionals had come to Venezuela. Venezuela compensated Cuba for medical costs by providing oil at below market prices.

Of a planned 8,500 Barrio Adentro I centers, 2,708 had been built by May 2007, using an investment of around US$126 million, with a further 3,284 under construction.

Barrio Adentro II established hundreds of diagnostic centers, rehabilitation centers, and other centers for specialized care. Through Barrio Adentro III, 300 Venezuelan hospitals were modernized. New specialist hospitals were built pursuant to Barrio Adentro IV.

In Caracas, Mission Barrio Adentro I and II centers in 32 parishes were the subject of constant complaints regarding performance, even after receiving 1.492 million bolívares from the government. Councilman Alejandro Vivas stated that "instead of having positive results, what is observed is the discontent of the citizens for a performance that leaves much to be desired".

== Analysis ==
Jorge Díaz-Polanco, a sociologist of the Center for Development Studies (CENDES), stated that despite an increase in investment, the maternal mortality rate increased, and in 2009, the rate was 70 deaths per 100,000 live births, the highest since the 1990s.

In Caracas, Mission Barrio Adentro I and II centers in 32 parishes were the subject of constant complaints about performance, even after being funded 1.492 million Bolivares by the government. Councilman Alejandro Vivas stated that "instead of having positive results, what is observed is the discontent of the citizens for a performance that leaves much to be desired". One academic study noted that the successes of the Barrio Adentro program in 2003 and 2004 may have "crucially influenced" Chávez's 59% to 41% victory in the 2004 Venezuelan recall referendum.

The functioning of the programme has been hampered by opposition from the media and Chávez's political opponents. However, this opposition has also made the programme more visible to the populace.

Arachu Castro, Assistant Professor of Social Medicine at Harvard Medical School, wrote that the programme has achieved "the materialization of the right to health care for millions of Venezuelans". Due to its reliance on community organisation, the programme has "created a new space for political participation and activism that has forcefully extended throughout Venezuela".

By 2017, it was reported by The Miami Herald that though the program had saved lives, it was "also clear the program is less effective than the administration would like the world to believe," with reports of exaggerated and fraudulent data being reported by Cuban medical personnel who had previously worked under the mission.

=== Abandonment ===
In July 2007, Douglas León Natera, chairman of The Venezuelan Medical Federation, reported that up to 70% of the Barrio Adentro modules had been either abandoned or were left unfinished. In some cases, the Venezuelan government accused elected opposition officials of trying to impede or close existing Missions. In 2006, Chávez accused the governor of Zulia State of impeding Barrio Adentro there. According to investigative journalist Patricia Marcano, in 2010 the Venezuelan government promised to start 357 clinics of which 148 were completed. In 2012, 298 clinics were promised, and 175 were completed; in 2013, 62 were promised, with 35 completed.

In December 2014, it was estimated that 80% of Barrio Adentro establishments were abandoned, with reports of some structures being filled with trash or becoming unintentional shelters for the homeless. The majority of Cuban medical personnel had left Venezuela as of 2016.

=== Defections ===
In August 2006, the George W. Bush administration of the United States created the Cuban Medical Professional Parole program, specifically targeting Cuban medical personnel and encouraging them to defect when working in a country outside of Cuba. According to a 2007 paper published in The Lancet medical journal, "growing numbers of Cuban doctors sent overseas to work are defecting to the United States". Cuban doctors working abroad are reported to be monitored by "minders" and are subject to curfew.

In February 2010, seven Cuban doctors who defected to the US introduced an indictment against the governments of Cuba and Venezuela and the oil company PDVSA for what they considered was a conspiracy to force them to work under conditions of "modern-day slaves" as payment for the Cuban government's debt. In 2014, it was reported by a Miami NGO, Solidarity Without Borders, that at least 700 Cuban medical personnel had left Venezuela in the past year and that hundreds of Cuban personnel had asked for advice on how to escape from Venezuela weekly. Solidarity Without Borders also stated that Cuban personnel cannot refuse to work, cannot express complaints, may be blackmailed, and suffer threats against their family in Cuba.

== Controversy ==
=== Licensure ===
The Venezuelan Medical Federation, the largest association of medical doctors in Venezuela, opposed the use of Cuban doctors in Mission Barrio Adentro and was in a legal dispute with the Chávez administration over the legitimacy of the Cuban doctors' licensure and practice. In 2003, they obtained a court order preventing Cuban doctors from practicing in Venezuela, on the basis that they were not properly licensed according to the Venezuelan system. A compromise was reached enabling them to continue working in Barrio Adentro.

=== Irregularities in funding ===
In 2014, the Comptroller General of the Republic "found serious irregularities in the ... repair, modernization, and extension of eight national referral hospitals". In 2006, the Venezuelan government funded companies without reason or certain regulations. The Comptroller said that the project was "marked by weakness and improvisations" and that "[t]his authorization does not imply commitment to the Foundation or the MPPS (Ministry of Health)".

=== Dumping of medicine and faking of reports ===
In 2017, The Miami Herald reported that groups of Cuban health care workers who had defected from the program stated that due to the daily quotas of patients, they would often feel pressured to fake paperwork and throw away medicine, since regular audits of their supplies meant they needed them to match their patient count. If Cuban medical personnel did not meet their quotas, they were threatened with having their pay cut or being sent back to Cuba.

=== Medical care and election tampering ===
The New York Times interviewed sixteen Cuban medical professionals in 2019 who had worked for Barrio Adentro before the 2018 Venezuelan presidential elections; all sixteen revealed that they were required to participate in voting fraud. Some of the Cubans said that "command centers" for elections were placed near clinics to facilitate "dispatching doctors to pressure residents". Some tactics reported by the Cubans were unrelated to their profession: they were given counterfeit cards to vote even though they were not eligible voters, they witnessed vote tampering with officials opening ballot boxes and destroyed ballots, and they were told to instruct easily manipulated elderly patients in how to vote.

But they also "described a system of deliberate political manipulation"; their services as medical professionals "were wielded to secure votes for the governing Socialist Party, often through coercion," they told The New York Times. Facing a shortage of supplies and medicine, they were instructed to withhold treatment – even for emergencies – so supplies and treatment could be "doled out closer to the election, part of a national strategy to compel patients to vote for the government". They reported that life-saving treatment was denied to patients who supported the opposition. As the election neared, they were sent door-to-door, on house visits with a political purpose: "to hand out medicine and enlist voters for Venezuela's Socialist Party". Patients were warned that they could lose their medical care if they did not vote for the Socialist Party, and that, if Maduro lost, ties would be broken with Cuba, and Venezuelans would lose all medical care. Patients with chronic conditions and those at risk of death if they couldn't get medicine were a particular focus of these tactics. One said that government officials were posing as doctors to make these house calls before elections; "We, the doctors, were asked to give our extra robes to people. The fake doctors were even giving out medicines, without knowing what they were or how to use them," he said.
