= Anarchism in Venezuela =

Anarchism in Venezuela has historically played a fringe role in the country's politics, being consistently smaller and less influential than equivalent movements in much of the rest of South America. It has, however, had a certain impact on the country's cultural and political evolution.

On the other hand, according to a series of surveys carried out by Latinobarómetro between 1998 and 2010, the population of Venezuela has maintained the most favorable view of a statist policy compared to that of other Latin American countries. Although the percentage increased throughout the government of Hugo Chávez, a 2017 study by the Delphos Institute showed a decrease in these values, but had not yet reached the pre-1998 levels.

== History ==
In early 1810, during the debates within the Patriotic Society regarding the concept of federalism, Coto Paúl, himself influenced by the works of William Godwin, proclaimed the following words against those who saw federalist ideas as anarchic:

Anarchy! It is liberty that unties the shackles of tyranny. Anarchy! When the gods of the weak mistrust and curse it dreadfully, I bow to it on my knees. Sirs! May anarchy guide us to Congress with that burning flame of the furies in our hands, and may its smoke intoxicate those partisans of order and lead them to follow it through the streets and plazas yelling “Liberty!”

— Coto Paúl

Simón Rodríguez was also inspired by the ideas of utopian socialists, especially in their pedagogical approaches. Some anarchists give a libertarian interpretation to Rodríguez's idea of the toparquía, rule by independent districts. For J.A. Calzadilla Arreaza, Simón Rodríguez's toparchy "steals the word from the lexicon of feudalism to turn it into a new republican and democratic concept, no longer lordship over the place, but a place with power of its inhabitants and their wills".

=== Early industrialization ===
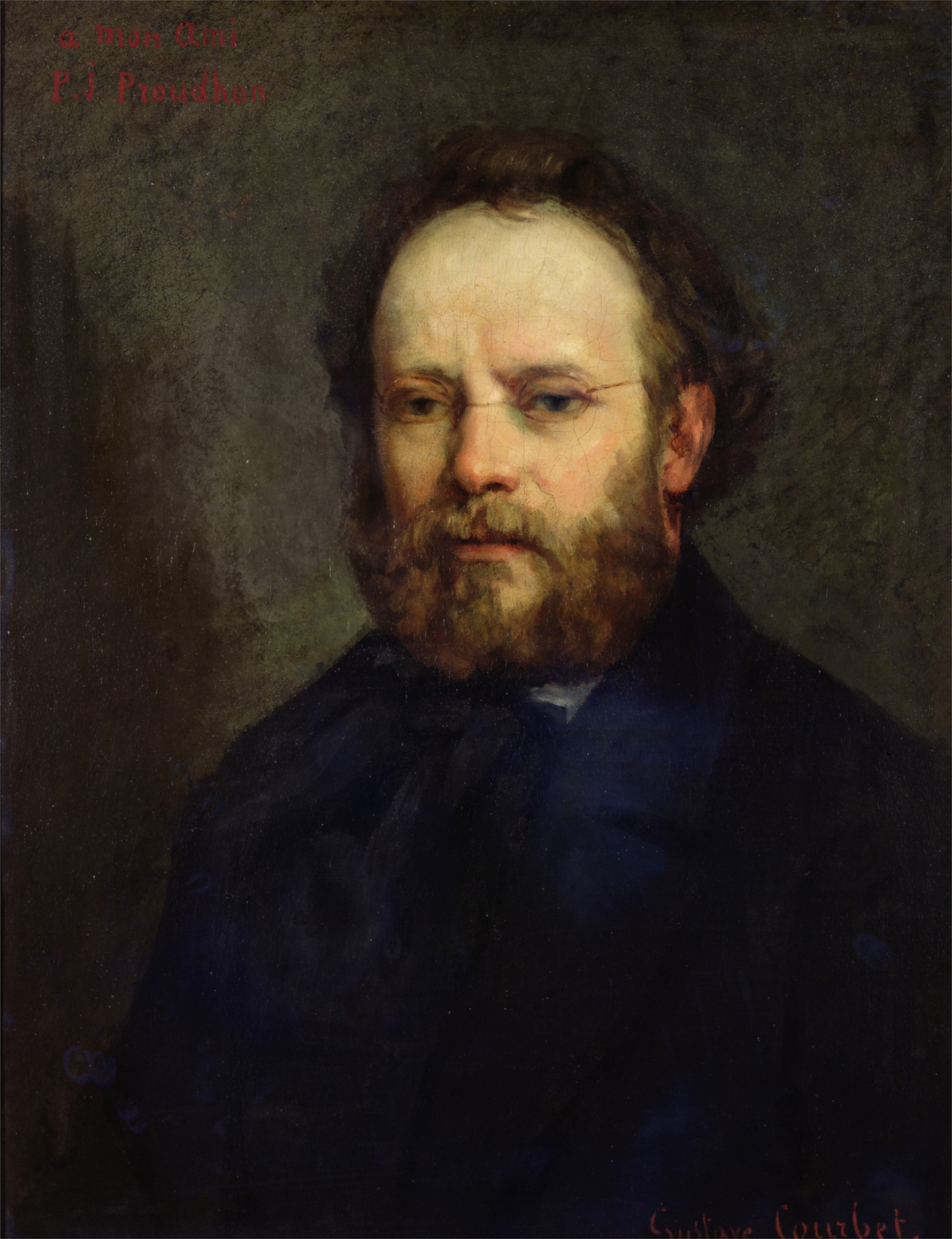
Pierre-Joseph Proudhon, founder of mutualist philosophy and early inspiration for socialism in Venezuela

During the time of the United States of Venezuela, between the late 19th century and the first half of the 20th century, the most active period in the region's anarchist history, there were few Venezuelan anarchists. There were, however, a somewhat significant number of local intellectuals who were at least influenced by the ideology's theorists. Although the Venezuelan conservative Fermín Toro was one of the main promoters of the laissez faire philosophy in Venezuela, he later rejected these positions, approaching the socialist ideas of the time, including some of Pierre-Joseph Proudhon. However, he defended non-libertarian positions as a central-federal political order. The writer Rafael María Baralt also quoted Proudhon on various occasions and even met him personally and spoke with him.

Ángel Capelletti and Carlos Manuel Rama argue in their book El anarquismo en América Latina ("Anarchism in Latin America") that Ezequiel Zamora, a liberal politician and prominent rebel leader during the Federal War, was influenced by Proudhonian ideas. According to Laureano Villanueva, Zamora had socialist ideas and “was not waging wars to impose rulers on the peoples, but the other way around, so that the people could govern themselves, since it was in this way that he understood liberalism and the Federation”.

On September 18, 1852, the work Analysis of socialism and a clear, methodical and impartial exposition of the main ancient and modern socialists, especially those of Saint-Simón, Fourier, Owen, F. Leroux and Proudhon, was published in the Caracas Post by an anonymous author, which was intended to be a synthesis of the socialist doctrines of the time.

While in Venezuela, the French anarchist and impressionist painter, Camille Pissarro, developed a political commitment by observing the social injustices in the country, which influenced his arrival to anarchism.

After the fall of the Paris Commune in 1871, several exiles, among whom were Proudhonian libertarians, founded the Venezuelan section of the International Workingmen's Association, which existed at least until 1893 since that year a communiqué was sent to the Zurich Congress, signed by Bruno Rossner, H Wilhof and A Pisen. However, the organization did not manage to permeate within the Venezuelan labor movement, limiting itself to foreign workers. Like other Latin American sections of the International, it had sizeable Proudhonian as well as Bakuninist influence.

=== Under the Gómez dictatorship ===
One reason behind the weakness of the early anarchist movement was the regime of Juan Vicente Gómez, who ruled Venezuela as dictator between 1908 and 1935. Gómez extensively persecuted rivals, political dissidents, and trade unionists. Among the later victims were members of a nascent anarcho-syndicalist movement, belonging to an ideology brought in by radical immigrants from Europe. While they were few in numbers, the efforts of these people in forming mutual societies, organizing oil industry strikes, spreading propaganda, etc. gained them a certain notoriety, but also the full attention of Gómez's persecution.

In 1909, Manuel Vicente Martínez published El socialismo y las clases jornaleras, a work "with a clear Proudhonian mutualist orientation", according to Rodolfo Montes de Oca. In addition to Proudhon, reference is also made to Jean Grave, Charles Malato, Peter Kropotkin and Alfred Naquet.

Some early communists had anarchist influences: Pío Tamayo, a revolutionary poet and co-founder of the Communist Party of Venezuela, taught his fellow political prisoners the "socialism of Bakunin and Marx". Tamayo, who died in prison, was imprisoned by Gómez. Another political prisoner during this period was the Colombian individualist anarchist Biofilo Panclasta (1879–1943), who participated in the "Revolución Liberal Restauradora" of Cipriano Castro, aiding in the overthrow of President Ignacio Andrade, prior to his encounter of anarchist thought. Arrested in 1914 after returning to Venezuela, Panclasta spent seven years in prison, more due to his friendship with Castro (deposed in a coup d'état by Gómez) than for his ideology.

The Venezuelan naturist philosopher Carlos Brandt, although at first a sympathizer of former president Cipriano Castro, changed his thinking to a "vegetarian-like pacifism." He explored different currents such as "anti-vivisection, pantheism, naturism, anarchism and above all pacifism as an ethic and ideal social model for humanity." Brandt established a friendship with the anarcho-pacifist Leo Tolstoy. He also became friends with George Bernard Shaw, Albert Einstein, Ernst Haeckel, Max Nordau, Gabriela Mistral, Alfred Russel Wallace and other thinkers of his time. The dictatorship of Juan Vicente Gómez soon landed him to prison and later forced him into exile. Fleeing from the Gómez dictatorship, he published his book El vegetarianismo where "for the first time in anarchism, he was not only committed to the vegetarian diet solely or mainly because of its healthiness, but because of a commitment to respect animals based on the fact that human beings are also an animal". Brandt collaborated with the libertarian magazine Generación Consciente in Spain.

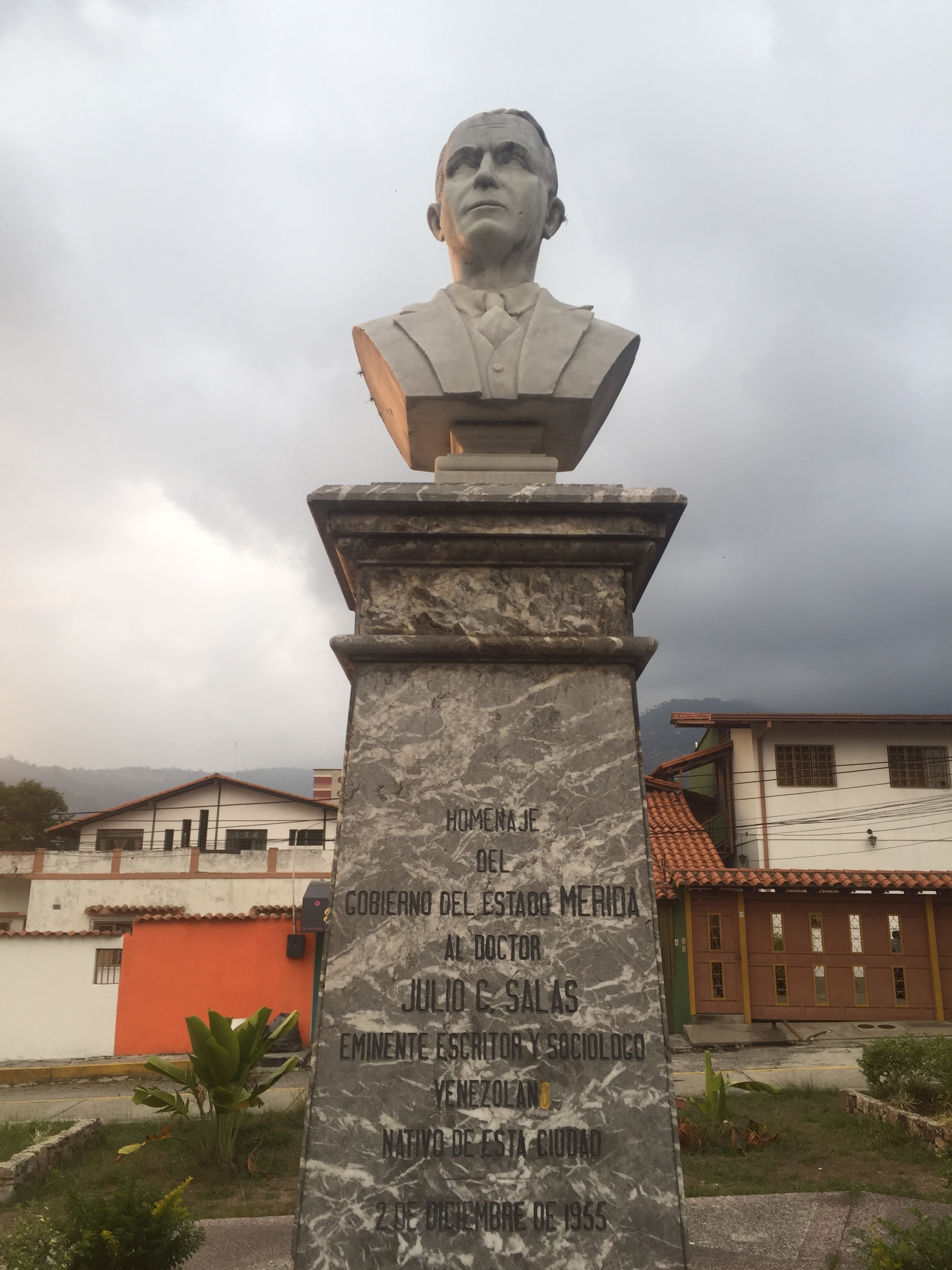
Bust of Julio César Salas, Venezuelan defender of Tolstoyan ideas.

Another promoter of Tolstoyan ideas was Julio César Salas from Mérida, who founded the newspaper Paz y Trabajo in 1904, later continuing on the magazine De Re Indica. Salas made friends with anarchists like José Ingenieros. However, he never openly declared himself an "anarchist."

Rafael Bolívar Coronado, a Villacuran lyricist for the famous song Alma Llanera, collaborated with his pen with the libertarian movement of Catalonia. Alma Llanera, known today as the second national anthem of Venezuela, had a great impact that led the dictator Juan Vicente Gómez himself to grant Bolívar Coronado a scholarship to study in Spain. As the ship set sail he ran to the deck and shouted: "Death to Gómez, the tyrant!" and declared: "I am an anarchist, Bolshevik and ... racist". Later he said about the Alma llanera: "Of all my abominations, I regret the lyrics of Alma Llanera the most".

The Venezuelan artist, antimilitarist and anarchist Mattia Léoni (born in Puerto Cabello in 1897), together with his brother Léonidas, joined the libertarian movement of Tuscany, Italy, at a very young age, where he trained as a sculptor at the Carrara School of Fine Arts. During World War I both brothers managed to go into exile in France and joined the libertarian school La Ruche in Paris. Mattia Léoni died in 1985 in Paris, France.

On July 3, 1918, what Julio Godio called "the first industrial strike in Venezuela" occurred, which involved the workshops of Aroa as well as the transit personnel of The Bolivar Railway Company Limited, where the Italian anarchist Vincenzo Cusatti participated as its leader. Although this strike was defeated, it left its mark on the Venezuelan trade union movement.

Around 1931, anarchist tendencies predominated in the clandestine oil union Sociedad de Auxilio Mutuo de Obreros Petroleros (SAMOP) in which there were some American workers affiliated with the Industrial Workers of the World. However, this was not a specifically anarchist organization, especially considering that its main animator, Rodolfo Quintero, was a Marxist.

After the end of the Gómez regime, and with the growth of new politicals movements in Venezuela, many libertarian-minded radicals were absorbed by or helped found non-anarchist organizations, as in the case of Pío Tamayo. Like Tamayo, some joined the Communist Party of Venezuela. Others were among the founders of the Democratic Action in 1941. Between 1936 and 1945, anti-anarchist repression had a constitutional footing, in the form of the Ley Lara (Lara Law).

=== Republic of Venezuela ===
After the Spanish Civil War, many exiled anarchists arrived in Venezuela, finding a political climate far different from that of Francoist Spain. This second wave of anarchist European immigrants caused the regrowth of the small libertarian scene, primarily through the foundation of the Federación Obrera Regional Venezolana (FORVE, Venezuelan Regional Workers Federation) in 1958, after ten years of harsh military dictatorship. FORVE was affiliated with the International Workers' Association, a global anarcho-syndicalist movement founded in 1922. Some additional minor groups were formed, and newspapers, pamphlets and books were published, but few of these left the Spanish immigrant milieu.

Among the exiled Spanish anarchists was Concha Liaño, founder of the Mujeres Libres. She lived in Venezuela from 1958 until her death. In 2012, Liaño affirmed that "[Hugo] Chávez is an envoy from God." Another Spanish anarchist was Antonio Serrano (1919–2008), founder of the Venezuelan anarchist newspaper El Libertario. Also living in Venezuela was the Spanish anarchist writer Germinal Gracia. In later years, as the ageing Spanish Civil War veterans diminished in importance, few movements would associate with the anarchist label.

In 1968, Rafael Caldera was elected as president of Venezuela, initiating a policy of "pacification" for the leftist armed groups in Venezuela. This generated a series of changes in the Venezuelan left, with some deciding to make a political life within the Venezuelan state scheme. Around that time, in part due to criticisms of certain authoritarian positions held by the Communist Party of Venezuela, the Movement for Socialism (1971), Radical Cause (1971) and the Party of the Venezuelan Revolution (1966) split from the party.

Although he was not exactly an anarchist, former guerrilla Douglas Bravo - founder of the Party of the Venezuelan Revolution - proposed the "model of coexistence", "where the armed forces are not the center of power, nor is the party the center of power. Instead, the new social organization will be governed by organized communities”; and he explained that “what happens is that for the State to exist, the State disjoins the community, it takes away the sovereign powers of the community. When the community assumes its own sovereign, democratic, and more than democratic, convivial powers, there is no need for a party, there is no need for the State, there is no need for the police.”

For his part, the also former guerrilla Alfredo Maneiro - founder of Radical Cause - criticized statism, although without renouncing the parties, however, he said that the party, in order not to become bureaucratized, should move with the grassroots social struggles. In addition to that, he supported a radical democracy and rejected state paternalism such as that represented by the minimum wage, which in his opinion impaired "the capacity for union bargaining and the workers' struggle."

From a vision of a market socialism, Teodoro Petkoff - founder of the Movement to Socialism - affirmed that Marxists in Venezuela must assume positions that diminish the role of the State in the economy to favor the development of the productive forces in order to break with the state capitalism that suffocates them, and he assured from a Marxist proposition that “societies begin to change when the development of their productive forces collide with the relations of production. That is when the instances of social change take place.”

Faced with the failure of the armed struggle in Venezuela, important leaders of the Revolutionary Left Movement such as Domingo Alberto Rangel and Simón Sáez Mérida began a process of radicalization. The former became a promoter of abstentionism while he edited the magazine Al Margen. Later they came to sympathize with anarchism.

Some libertarian influence was seen among students in the Renovación Universitaria (University Renewal) of 1968–1970, part of the Protests of 1968. In this there were occupations of faculties, assemblies, demonstrations, graffiti, flyers, publications in the press and street clashes against the police. During that time, a transformation of the universities was demanded, questioning the current study curriculum, the political parties entrenched within the universities (including those of the left) and the traditional evaluation system. They defended a greater participatory democratization of the study centers, counting for this with a massive participation of students, teachers and employees. This movement was stopped especially with the Kangaroo Operation on October 31, 1969, where Rafael Caldera intervened with the army at the Central University of Venezuela. After 19 days, the University of Los Andes in Mérida was also raided.

On the other hand, some politicians with a libertarian orientation —especially of Hispanic anarcho-syndicalist inspiration— such as Francisco Olivo, Pedro Bernardo Pérez Salinas and Salom Mesa were members of the Democratic Action party, when it had a more popular inclination. This led to exiled Spanish anarchists joining this party. For his part, Salom Mesa, after being a member of the Democratic Action and the People's Electoral Movement parties and even becoming a deputy in Congress on several occasions, chose to subscribe to anarchism and reject "political action".

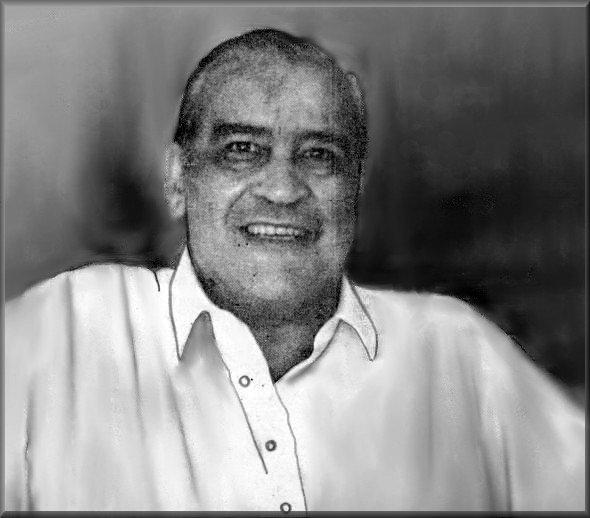
Ángel Cappelletti, an Argentine anarchist who worked in Venezuela for many years.

It wasn't until the 1980s that anarchist movements again resurfaced - the Colectivo Autogestionario Libertario (CAL. Libertarian Self-managing Collective) was the most visible. Two journals, El Libertario (published by CAl 1985–87) and Correo A (published 1987–1995) emerged. Some youths were drawn in through anarcho-punk. The Cuban anarchist editorial collective Guángara had correspondents in Venezuela, by 1985. Prominently, the Argentine anarchist philosopher and university professor Ángel Cappelletti (1927–1995) worked in Venezuela for 26 years, until his retirement in 1994.

=== Resurgence and contemporary ===
In 1995 the newspaper El Libertario reappeared, published by a group calling itself the Commission of Anarchist Relations (CRA). The CRA, which restyled itself the Collective Editorship in 2007, opposes the Chavismo and Bolivarian Revolution of former President Hugo Chávez, the Fifth Republic Movement, and its successor the United Socialist Party of Venezuela. The group sees itself as involved in a "tri-polar struggle" against both the left-wing government and Venezuela's American-backed right-wing opposition movement. El Libertario publishes five editions yearly. Other minor groups exist or have existed, such as the CESL in Caracas, the CEA in Mérida, and the Ateneo La Libertaria, first active in Biscucuy and then in the rural area to the southwest of Lara. In January 2006 the Alternative Social Forum was organized in Caracas, and the Anarchist Black Cross has been somewhat active in the country.

From 2010, different initiatives have arisen such as the Colectivo Zona de Libertad, the Sabino Romero Social Center, the Temporally Autonomous Zone Mobile Library, the Libertarian Student Pedagogical Movement (MUPEL), the Anarkismo Guacareño group, the ARDA collective and the Lonely Mobile Library.

In 2011, the minor Federación Anarquista Revolucionaria de Venezuela (FARV) was formed. Unlike the CRA and El Libertario, the group took firmly pro-Boliviarian stances, stating that it supported the "Bolivarian process critically as radical militants of the Social revolution". Their ideas and principles were "based on the especifist trend within libertarian communism".

In his later years, the long-standing Marxist Domingo Alberto Rangel collaborated with the anarchist newspaper El Libertario, and in an interview in 2011 he stated that "the new paradigm is anarchism."

During his adolescence, the Justice First party deputy Miguel Pizarro was an anarchist who "moved between readings by Bakunin and Kropotkin." As a high school student, he was the founder of Ni Casco Ni Uniforme ("No Helmet Nor Uniform"), an antimilitarist movement opposed to the government imposition of Pre-Military Instruction in secondary education. This fact would lead him to be expelled from the institution where he studied.

In October 2013, Chávez's successor, President Nicolás Maduro, accused unionist workers of the SIDOR steel company of being behind regional unemployment, denouncing them as "anarcho-syndicalist populists".

== See also ==
- Category:Venezuelan anarchists
- List of anarchist movements by region
