= Education in Venezuela =

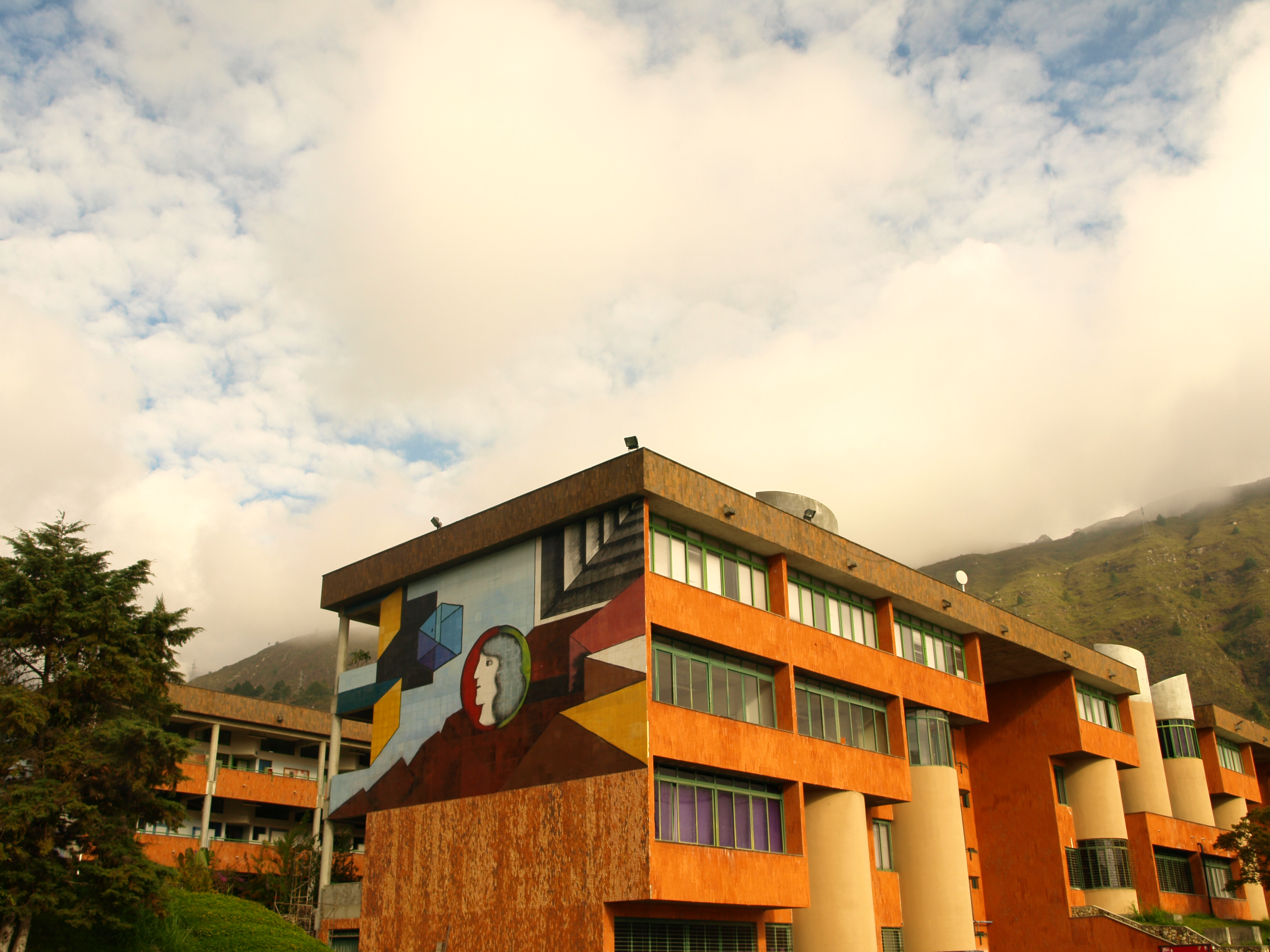
Los Andes University, Venezuela

Education in Venezuela is regulated by the Venezuelan Ministry of Education. Nine years of education are compulsory. The school year starts in mid/late September or early-October and ends in late-June or early-July.

Under the social programs of the Bolivarian Revolution, a number of Bolivarian Missions focus on education, including Mission Robinson (primary education including literacy), Mission Ribas (secondary education) and Mission Sucre (higher education).

== History ==
Education in colonial Venezuela was neglected compared to other parts of the Spanish Empire which were of greater economic interest. The first movement towards systematic education of the youth was promulgated in Bishop Diego de Baños y Sotomayor's 1622 Council of Santo Domingo, which required church parishes to establish schools for the education of children in the Spanish Caribbean, as well as Venezuela. The main focus of this education was literacy in Spanish and religious education. After this, education was mostly done through the Jesuits and Franciscans. The Franciscans had convents, some of which also contained seminaries, in Caracas, Trujillo, El Tocuyo, Maracaibo, and Barquisimeto, and in the 18th century built ones in Coro, Valencia, Cumaná, Margarita, Carora, San Felipe, and Guanare.

Education at all levels was limited in both quality and quantity, and wealthy families sought education through private tutors, travel, and the study of works banned by the Empire. Examples include the independence leader Simón Bolívar (1783–1830) and his tutor Simón Rodríguez (1769–1854), and the educator Andrés Bello (1781–1865). Rodríguez, who drew heavily on the educational theories of Jean-Jacques Rousseau, was described by Bolívar as the "Socrates of Caracas".

The first university in Venezuela, now the Central University of Venezuela, was established in 1721. Another was built in Maracaibo in 1735, and another in Coro some time between 1754-1764. Caracas was the principal hub for education in Venezuela. Requests for the expansion of its faculties are recorded, including Francisco de Andújar's desire for mathematics and natural history chairs, Baltasar de los Reyes Marrero's want of a philosophy chair. In the 1800s decade, Miguel José Sanz and Juan José Landaeta each drove for a system of primary schools to be established in the city, but development was stalled until after Spain was overthrown.

Free and compulsory education for ages 7 to 14 was established by decree on 27 June 1880, under President Antonio Guzmán Blanco, and was followed by the creation of the Ministry of Public Instruction in 1881, also under Guzmán Blanco. In the 15 years after 1870, the number of primary schools quadrupled to nearly 2,000 and the enrollment of children expanded ten-fold, to nearly 100,000.

In the early twentieth century, education was substantially neglected under the dictator Juan Vicente Gómez, despite the explosion wealth due to oil. A year after his death, only 35% of the school-age population was enrolled, and the national literacy rate was below 20%. In 1928 a student revolt, though swiftly put down, saw the birth of the Generation of 1928, which formed the core of the democracy movement of later years.

== Educational stages ==
=== Primary and secondary education ===
Many children under five attend a preschool. Children are required to attend school from the age of six. They attend primary school until they are eleven. They are then promoted to the second level of basic education, where they stay until they are 14 or 15. Public school students usually attend classes in shifts. Some go to school from early in the morning until about 1:30 PM and others attend from the early afternoon until about 6:00 PM. All schoolchildren wear uniforms. Although education is mandatory for children, some poor children do not attend school because they must work to support their families.

Venezuelan education starts at the preschool level, and can be roughly divided into Nursery (ages below 4) and Kindergarten (ages 4–6). Students in Nursery are usually referred to as "yellow shirts", after the color of uniform they must wear according to the Uniform Law, while students in Kindergarten are called "red shirts".

Basic education comprises grades 1 through 6, and lacks a general governing program outside of the Math curriculum. English is taught at a basic level throughout Basic education. These students are referred to as "white shirts". Upon completing Basic education, students are given a Basic Education Certificate.

Middle education (grades 7–9) explores each one of the sciences as a subject and algebra. English education continues and schools may choose between giving Ethics or Catholic Religion. These students are referred to as "blue shirts". Venezuelans cannot choose their classes.

Once a student ends 9th grade, they enter Diversified education, so called because the student must choose between studying either humanities or the sciences for the next two years. This choice usually determines what majors they can opt for at the college level. These students are referred to as "beige shirts". Upon completing Diversified education (11th grade), students are given the title of Bachiller en Ciencias (Bachelor of Sciences) or Bachiller en Humanidades (Bachelor of Humanities). Some schools may include professional education, and instead award the title of Técnico en Ciencias (Technician of Sciences).

==== Socialist learning ====
Under the Bolivarian government, the Venezuelan Ministry of Education proposed an educational curriculum that would help establish a socialist country. On 14 May 1999, the President Hugo Chávez approved lists of books for schools to educate young citizens on socialist ideology. The "Revolutionary Curriculum" was to feature material on theorist Karl Marx, revolutionary Che Guevara, and liberator Simón Bolívar. According to Venezuela's culture ministry, the compulsory book list is being designed to help schoolchildren eliminate "capitalist thinking" and better understand the ideas and values "necessary to build a socialist country."

In 2011, the government's "Bolivarian" textbooks began to use socialist learning material. According to the Associated Press, pro-government messages were "scattered through the pages of Venezuela's textbooks". Math problems included fractions involving government food programs, English lessons included "reciting where late President Hugo Chávez was born, and learn[ing] civics by explaining why the elderly should give him thanks". The Venezuelan government released 35 million books to primary and secondary schools called the Bicentennial Collection, which have "political content" in each book, that over 5 million children had used between 2010 and 2014.

According to Leonardo Carvajal from the Assembly of Education in Venezuela, the collection of books had "become a vulgar propaganda". Venezuelan historian Inés Quintero stated that in all social science books, "there is an abuse of history, ... a clear trend favoring the current political project and the political programs of the Government". Geometry professor Tomas Guardia of the Central University of Venezuela stated that "the math textbook is so problematic, there's a good chance this book is also full of errors and propaganda" after he spent months inspecting math textbooks and noticed simple errors, such as calling a shape with four sides a square when it could also be a rectangle or a rhombus. According to the Center of Reflection and Education Planning (CERPE) from a 2014 study by Alfredo Keller et al., 77% of Venezuelans rejected the implementation of education based on a socialist ideology.

==== State of Miranda within the PISA program ====
The government of the state of Miranda joined the PISA programme in 2010 and the first results were published in December 2011. Initial results show pupils in schools managed by the regional government achieved a mean score of 422 on the PISA reading literacy scale, the same score pupils in Mexico received.

=== Higher education ===
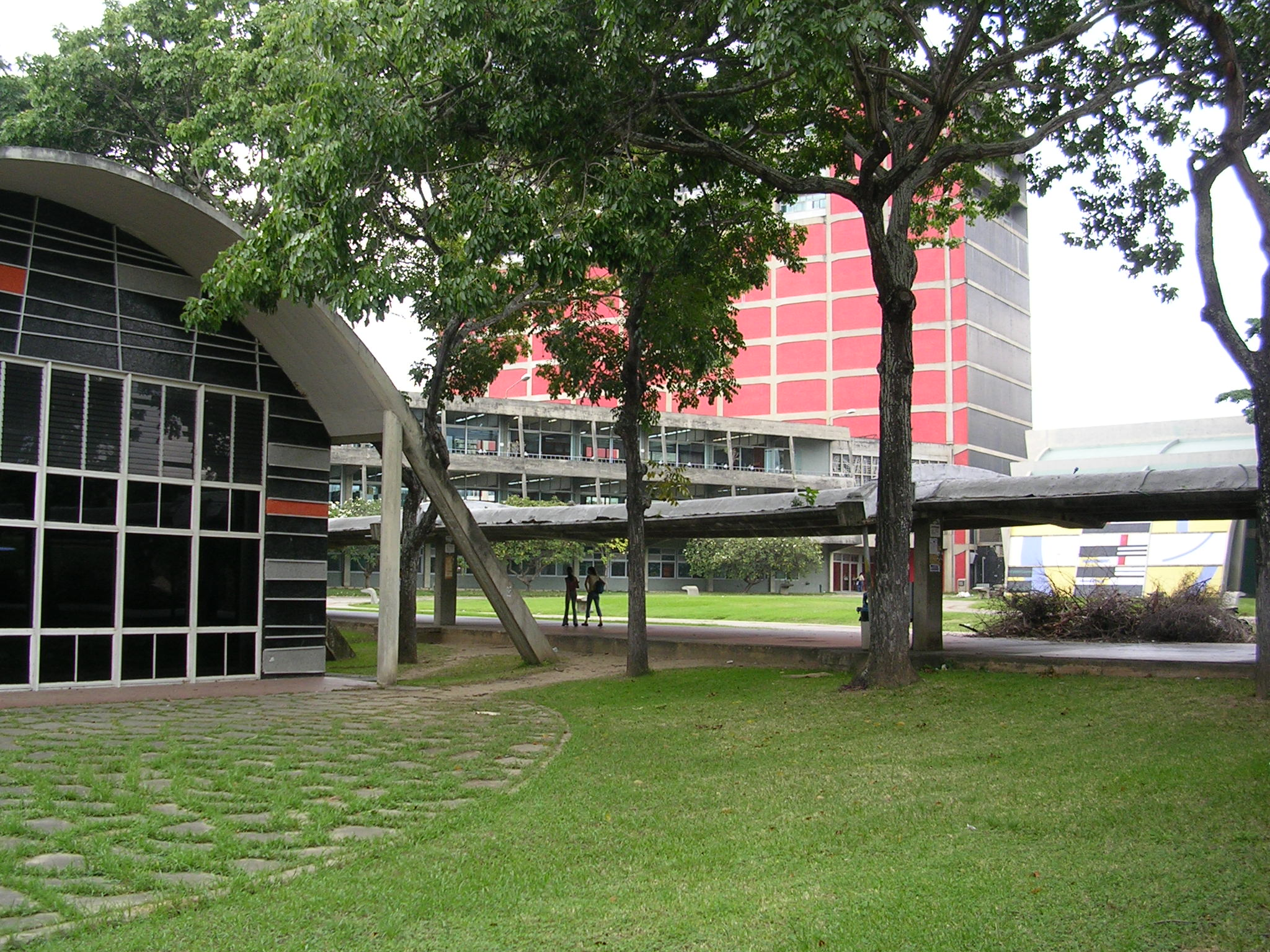
Murals by Alejandro Otero at the Central University of Venezuela,the largest university in the country.

Venezuela has more than 90 institutions of higher education, with 860,000 students in 2002. Higher education remains free under the 1999 Constitution and was receiving 35% of the education budget, even though it accounted for only 11% of the student population. To address this problem, instead of improving primary and secondary education, the government established the Bolivarian University system in 2003, which was designed to democratize access to "higher education" by offering heavily politicized study programs to the public with only minimal entrance requirements. Autonomous public universities have had their operational budgets frozen by the state since 2004, and staff salaries have been frozen since 2008 despite an inflation of 20–30% a year.

Higher education institutions are traditionally divided into Technical Schools and Universities. Technical schools award the student with the title of Técnico Superior Universitario (University Higher Technician) after completing a three-year program. Universities award the student with the title of Licenciado (Bachelor) or Ingeniero (Engineer), among many others, according to a student's career choice after completing, in most cases, a five-year program. Some higher education institutions may award Diplomados (Specializations) but the time necessary to obtain one varies.

Post-graduate education follows the conventions of the United States (being named "Master's" and "Doctorate" after the programs there).

==== National Adimision System reform ====
In 2015, Venezuela reformed the National Admission System and gave the government total power to award positions to students in public universities. Along with the reform, other variables were introduced by the Bolivarian government that made it more difficult for students who do not have a lower-class background to find a position in a public university. The reform proved controversial, with protests and accusations that the reform was ideological in nature. According to Quartz, the Bolivarian government reform "disregards several Venezuelan legal precedents", including constitutional laws.

== Literacy ==
In the 1970s when Venezuela was experiencing huge growth from oil sales, the literacy rate increased from 77% to 93% by the start of Hugo Chávez's tenure, being one of the highest literacy rates in the region.

By 2007, of Venezuelans aged 21 and older, 95.2% could read and write. The literacy rate in 2007 was estimated to be 95.4% for males and 94.9% for females. In 2008, Francisco Rodríguez of Wesleyan University in Connecticut and Daniel Ortega of IESA stated that there was “little evidence” of “statistically distinguishable effect on Venezuelan illiteracy” during the Chávez administration. The Venezuelan government claimed that it had taught 1.5 million Venezuelans to read, but the study found that "only 1.1 million were illiterate to begin with" and that the illiteracy reduction of less than 100,000 can be attributed to adults that were elderly and died.

== Exodus of education professionals and graduates ==
=== Educational professionals ===
In 2014, reports emerged showing a high number of education professionals taking flight from educational positions in Venezuela along with the millions of other Venezuelans that had left the country during the presidency of Hugo Chávez, according to Iván de la Vega, a sociologist at Simón Bolívar University. According to the Association of Professors, the Central University of Venezuela lost around 700 faculty members between 2011 and 2012 with most being considered the next generation of professors. About 240 faculty members also quit at Simón Bolívar University. The reason for emigration is reportedly due to the high crime rate in Venezuela and inadequate pay. According to Claudio Bifano, president of the Venezuelan Academy of Physical, Mathematical and Natural Sciences, most of Venezuela's "technology and scientific capacity, built up over half a century" had been lost during Hugo Chávez's presidency. Bifano acknowledges the country's large educational funds and scientific staff, but states that the output of those scientists had dropped significantly. Bifano reports that between 2008 and 2012, international journals declined by 40%; with journals matching the same number as 1997, when Venezuela had about a quarter of the scientists it had between 2008 and 2012. He also says that more than half of the medical graduates of 2013 had left the country.

According to El Nacional, the flight of educational professionals resulted in a shortage of teachers in Venezuela. The director of the Center for Cultural Research and Education, Mariano Herrera, estimated that there was a shortage of about 40% for math and science teachers. Some teachers resorted to teaching multiple classes, and passing students out of convenience. The Venezuelan government seeks to curb the shortage of teachers through the Simón Rodríguez Micromission by cutting the graduation requirements for educational professionals to 2 years.

=== College graduates ===
In a study titled Venezolana Community Abroad: A New Method of Exile by Thomas Páez, Mercedes Vivas and Juan Rafael Pulido of the Central University of Venezuela, over 1.5 million Venezuelans, between 4% and 6% of Venezuela's population, left the country following the Bolivarian Revolution; more than 90% of those who left were college graduates, with 40% of them holding a Master's degree and 12% having doctorates and/or post doctorates. The study used official verification of data from outside of Venezuela and surveys from hundreds of former Venezuelans. Of those involved in the study, reasons for leaving Venezuela included lack of freedom, high levels of insecurity, and lack of opportunities in the country. Páez also explains how some parents in Venezuela tell their children to leave the country for protection from the insecurities Venezuelans face.

== See also ==
- List of universities in Venezuela
- Decree 1011
