= Urica =

- Location within Venezuela
- Coordinates: 9.714°N 64.008°W
- Time zone: UTC−4 (VET)

Urica is a town in the north-east of Venezuela. It is the capital of Urica Parish, in Pedro María Freites Municipality, in Anzoátegui State in Venezuela. Its population according to the Census of 2011 is 4,517.

== Geography ==
Urica is 45 km southeast of the population center of Santa Inés. It is situated on a plain bathed by the waters of the Rivers Urica and Amana, surrounded by the livestock farming areas within Anzoátegui and known for large-scale fruit production. Of geological interest is the Urica fault.

== Transport ==
An airport, code AG4119, is near the settlement.

== History ==
Urica was founded by Spaniards in the mid-18th century. Several notable battles have taken place in the vicinity, such as those of 1814 during the Venezuelan War of Independence, in which forces led by José Félix Ribas and José Francisco Bermúdez fought against the royalist commander José Tomás Boves. The battle of Curareque took place on 12 September of that year, and on 5 December the Battle of Urica, in which Boves was killed: his tomb is in the village. On 27 April 1870 the Battle of Altagracia was fought, and on 20 February 1902 the Battle of the Bridge.

In 1879, the National Congress of the Republic created the State of Oriente, whose capital would be Urica. This new territorial division, covering the present-day states of Anzoátegui, Sucre and Monagas, remained in force until 1881 when it was re-named Bermúdez state, and in 1898 became Sucre state.
