= Patriotic Society =

Patriotic Society can refer to multiple organizations:

- Patriotic Society (Russia), historical Russian charity organisation
- Patriotic Society (Venezuela), a Venezuelan revolutionary organization
- National Patriotic Society (1821–1822) formed by Walerian Łukasiński
- Patriotic Society or Patriotic Club (1830–1831) formed by various activists during the November Uprising

== See also ==
- Chinese Patriotic Catholic Association
