= Mission Robinson =

2003 Bolivarian mission in Venezuela

Mission Robinson is one of the Bolivarian Missions (a series of anti-poverty and social welfare programs) implemented by Hugo Chávez in 2003.

== Name ==
The name "Robinson" was given to the Mission in remembrance of the Venezuelan philosopher and educator Simón Rodríguez because he adopted the pseudonym Samuel Robinson during his exile from Spanish America.

== History ==
On May 23, 2003, the government implemented a pilot plan in the Capital District and the states of Vargas, Miranda and Aragua. The government followed with Mission Robinson I, a nationwide literacy program, on July 1, and on September 15, 2003, Mission Robinson II was created to continue the education to sixth grade for the first mission's graduates.

== Statistics ==
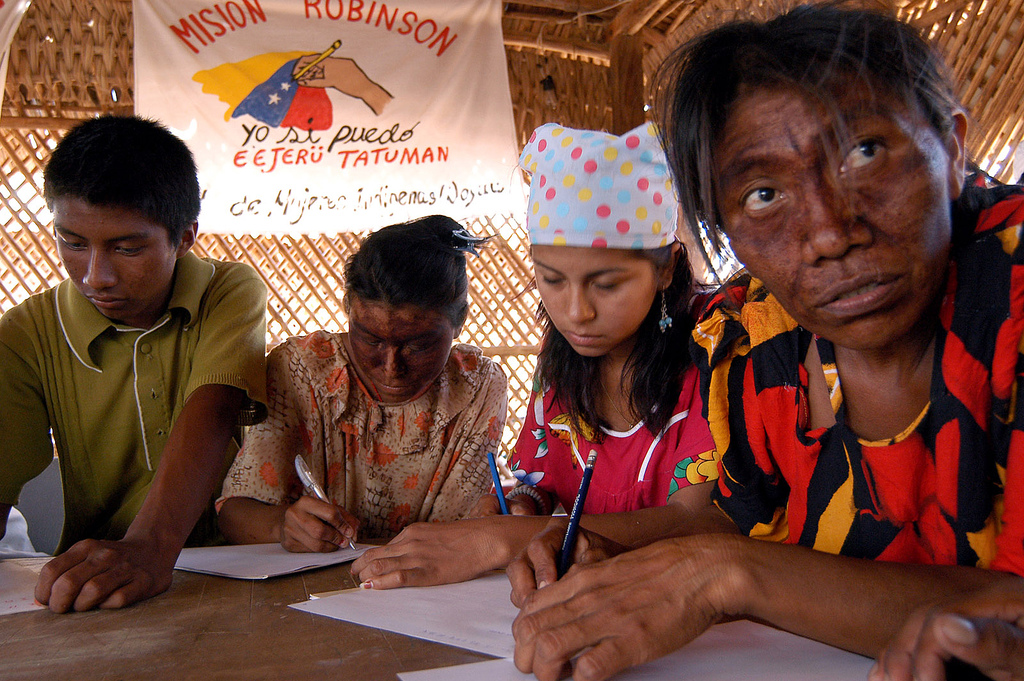
Mission Robinson of the Hugo Chávez government in Venezuela promoting the education of the Wayuu

On 28 October 2005, Venezuela declared itself a "Territory Free of Illiteracy". The government claimed that 1,482,000 adults had learned to read and write.

According to Francisco Rodríguez and Daniel Ortega of IESA, there was "little evidence" of "statistically distinguishable effect on Venezuelan illiteracy". The Venezuelan government claimed that it had taught 1.5 million Venezuelans to read, but the study found that "only 1.1m were illiterate to begin with" and that the illiteracy reduction of less than 100,000 can be attributed to adults that were elderly and died. Previous reports had claimed that the eradication of illiteracy had been UNESCO-verified. In October 2006, Venezuelan Education Minister Aristóbulo Istúriz clarified that Venezuela had not received a UNESCO certification because the organisation does not certify literacy programs.

== See also ==
- Education in Venezuela
- Decree 1011
- Mission Sucre
