= Consuelo Hernández =

Consuelo Hernández may refer to:

- Consuelo Hernández (poet), Colombian American poet, scholar, literary critic and professor
- Consuelo Hernandez (politician), member of the Arizona House of Representatives
