= Battle of La Victoria (1814) =

Venezuelan War of Independence battle

- Part of the Venezuelan War of Independence
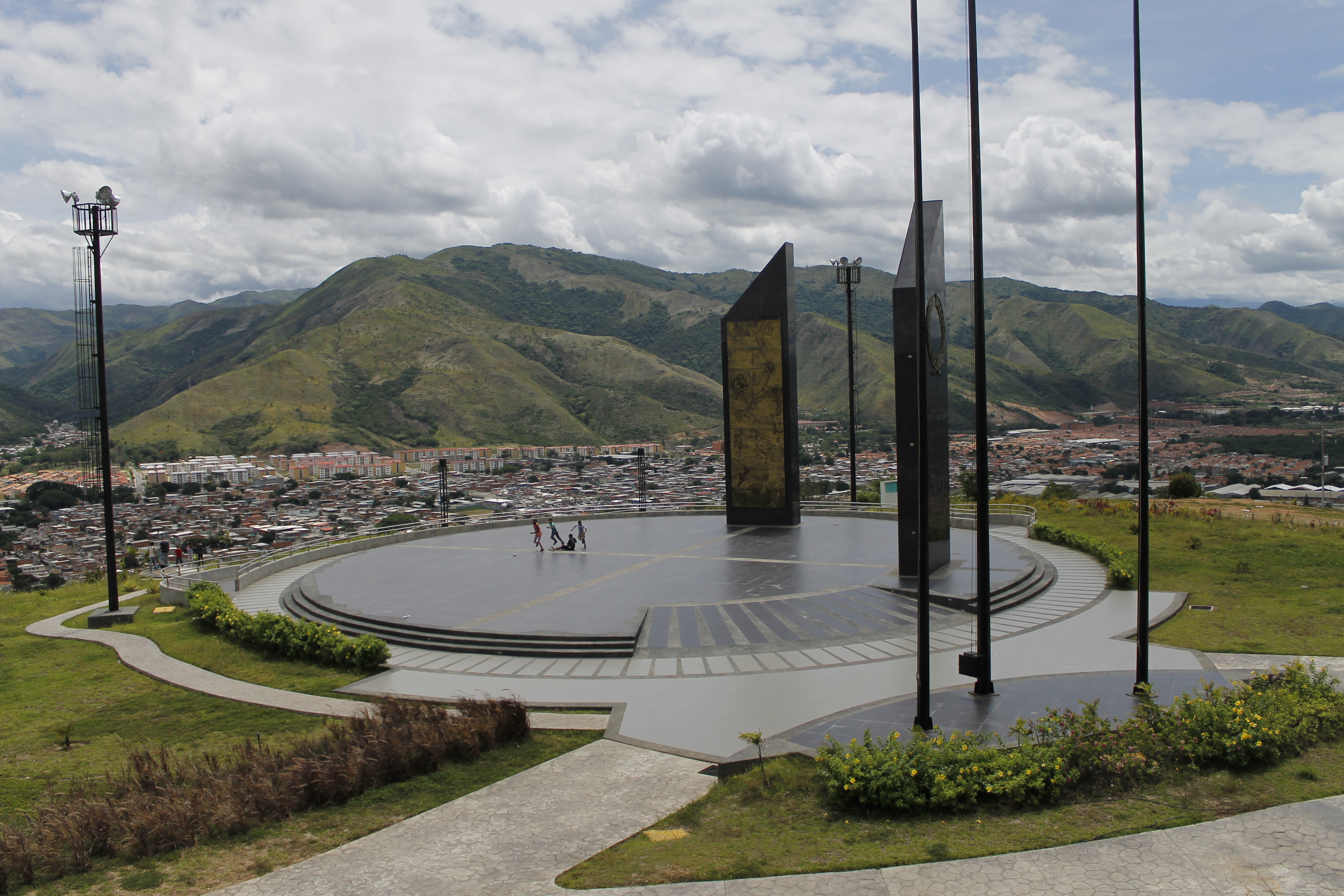
- Monument to the Youth, in commemoration of the battle of La Victoria.
Date	12 February 1814
Location	La Victoria, Venezuela 10°13′40″N 67°20′01″W
Result	Republican victory

Belligerents
United Provinces of Venezuela	(Spain) Spanish Empire

Commanders and leaders
José Félix Ribas; Vicente Campo Elías; Luis María Rivas-Dávila †; Mariano Montilla	José Tomás Boves; Francisco Tomás Morales

Strength
Total: 1,500: 220 cavalry; 120 soldiers of Dragoon Squadron; 85 seminarians; 5 artillery	Total: 2,500–4,000: 900–2,200 cavalry; 1,800 Infantry; Some cannons

The battle of La Victoria took place during the Venezuelan War of Independence when Royalist forces under José Tomás Boves tried to take the city of La Victoria, held by General José Félix Ribas.

== Battle ==
The battle was fought on 12 February 1814. Given the shortage of regular troops, Ribas had to arm a thousand students from colleges and seminaries in the city and other neighboring towns, including 85 students of the Seminary of Santa Rosa de Lima, Caracas. Before going into battle, General Ribas addressed the youths who accompanied him, ending with these words:

Soldiers: What we have desired will be held today: behold Boves. Five times larger is the army he brings to fight us, but it seems to me still insufficient to dispute our victory. You defend the lives of your children, the honor of your wives, the soil of your homeland from the fury of tyrants; show them your omnipotence. On this day that will be memorable, we cannot even choose between winning or dying: it is necessary to win! Long live the Republic !

The battle began at seven in the morning and lasted all day on the streets of the city. Republican troops built an impressive resistance to withstand the Royalist troops, led at that time by Francisco Tomás Morales. By late afternoon, victory had not yet gone to either side. While the fighting raged, the Patriots received a reinforcement of 220 infantry under Vicente Campo Elías, from San Mateo, that effectively broke the siege.

Hours later, Morales and his men withdrew through the mountains towards Pao de Zárate, pursued by the Republican cavalry. As a result of this Battle, the Royalist attempt to cut communications between Caracas and Valencia had failed.

Bolivar, informed about the victory of Ribas, granted him the title of "Defeater of Tyrants".

On 12 February 1947, the Constituent Assembly decreed that Venezuela would celebrate each anniversary of the battle as Youth Day, in honor of the young people who achieved this important victory. In Victoria's main square there is a sculptural group made by Eloy Palacios, erected in 1895, representing Ribas showing a youth how to use a rifle.
