= Mission Sucre =

Bolivarian mission providing tertiary education

Mission Sucre (Fundación Misión Sucre) (launched in late 2003) is one of the Bolivarian Missions (a series of anti-poverty and social welfare programs) implemented by the late Venezuelan president Hugo Chávez. The program provides free and ongoing higher (college and graduate level) education to the two million adult Venezuelans.

Mission Sucre was originally referred to as El Plan Extraordinario Mariscal Antonio José de Sucre, shortened as Misión Sucre. Named after the eighteenth century independence leader Antonio José de Sucre, Mission Sucre establishes as a strategy the mass education and graduation of university professionals in three years, as opposed to the traditionally mandated five or more years.

Mission Sucre imparts tertiary education; other educational missions include Mission Robinson (for instructing the illiterate) and Mission Ribas (for obtaining secondary studies, classes, and graduation certificates).

== See also ==
- Education in Venezuela
- Decree 1011
- Mission Robinson
