= Battle of La Victoria =

Battle of La Victoria may refer to:

- Battle of La Victoria (1812)
- Battle of La Victoria (1814)

== See also ==
- Battle of Victoria (disambiguation)
