= UBV =

UBV may mean:

- UBV photometric system, (or Johnson photometric system) in astronomy
- Universidad Bolivariana de Venezuela, Bolivarian University of Venezuela
