= Taita Boves =

- Directed by: Luis Alberto Lamata
- Written by: Luis Alberto Lamata
- Produced by: Luis Alberto Lamata
- Starring: Juvel Vielma Gledys ibarra Hector Manrique Daniiela Alvarado Antonio Dellii Pedro Duran
- Release date: 27 October 2010
- Country: Venezuela
- Language: Spanish

Taita Boves is a 2010 Venezuelan historical film loosely based on Boves el Urogallo, a novel by Francisco Herrera Luque. Directed by Luis Alberto Lamata, the film starred Juvel Vielma, Wilfredo Cisneros, Danela Alvarado, Hector Manrique, Marcos Moreno, Alberto Alifa.

Set in the period of Venezuelan independence war tale the history of José Tomás Boves, a ferocity warrior under the Spanish crown and his cruelty n the battlefield.

== Plot ==
Taita Boves chronicles a thirst for revenge that devastated a country. It tells the true story of José Tomás Boves, a cruel man who became a legend during the Venezuelan War of Independence, the most violent in the Americas. He went from seafarer to pirate, horse smuggler to prosperous merchant, prisoner to military chief. Spanish by birth, he spearheaded a grass roots troop of slaves, mulattoes, Indians and mestizos that crushed Simón Bolívar and his patriot army. Respectfully referred to as "Taita" by them, he fought for the underprivileged and the poorest of the poor, and curtailed three centuries of order in this colonial region. This film is about his passions and power, his loves and misadventures, and a bloody saga that rocked Venezuela.

== Cast ==
- Juvel Vielma as José Tomás Boves
- Wilfredo Cisneros as Padre llamozas
- Alberto Alifa as Juez
- Daniela Alvarado as Inés
- Hector Manrique as Vicente
- Antonio Delli as Diego
- Gledys Ibarra as Josefa
- Marcos Moreno as Remigio
- Pedro Duran as Sebastián.

== Production ==
The film was shot in the Venezuelan states of Aragua, Guárico and Miranda for nearly three months. The funds for the film are from the CNAC and the Villa del cine.

== Release ==
Taita Boves have a domestic release the 27 August 2010.

== Awards ==
In the 2010 edition of cinema film festival of Merida the movie earned six prize, include the best actor for Juvel Vielma
