= Miguel José Sanz =

Venezuelan lawyer and journalist

Miguel José Sanz (1756–1814) was a Venezuelan lawyer, journalist and politician.

== Biography ==
Sanz studied at the Central University of Venezuela and obtained a law degree, graduating in 1778.
In 1786, when the Royal Court of Caracas was founded, Sanz was appointed its rapporteur. Also around this time, he served as Simón Bolívar's tutor, who had lost his father before turning 3 years old. Sanz was a good advisor to the Bolívar family and Simón lived in his house for two years, until he returned to his home again.

Sanz had sympathies for the Republican cause and was expelled in 1809 to Puerto Rico, from where he returned a few months after the Revolution of April 19, 1810. Together with José Domingo Díaz, he wrote between November 1810 and July 1811 the newspaper "Semanario de Caracas", the first unofficial publication of the First Venezuelan Republic. Sanz was mainly in charge of the political section.

He was one of the advisors of General Francisco de Miranda in the founding of the Patriotic Society that would be established in 1810. He was appointed, along with Antonio Nicolás Briceño, Secretary of the Congress of 1811. Vice president of the House of Representatives in 1812, he was the first civilian to occupy the Secretary of State, War and Navy.

After the Capitulation of San Mateo (1812), he was locked up in the dungeons of Puerto Cabello by the Royalist authorities, but he was released in June 1813. When Bolívar occupied Caracas in August of the same year after the Admirable Campaign, Sanz joined the Republican cause again, participating in the establishment of the Second Venezuelan Republic.

In July 1814, when the Royalist forces approached Caracas, Sanz joined the 1814 Caracas Exodus, and reached Margarita Island. At the request of General José Félix Ribas, who appointed him his war advisor, he returned to the continent but was killed on 5 December that year in the Battle of Urica, where the Republican troops were defeated.

== Sources ==
- Bibliofep
- Venezuela tuya
