= Francisco de Andújar =

Capuchin friar and educator

Francisco de Paula Ravé y Berdura (October 1760 – 19 November 1818) was a Capuchin friar, educator, and naturalist active in the Captaincy General of Venezuela.

== Early life and education ==
Born in October 1760 to Miguel Alonso Ravé and María José de la Concepción Berdura de Andújar in Andújar, Spain, he received the habit in November 1777, changing his name to Francisco de Andújar. A year later he joined the Capuchin Order and was soon ordinated as a priest.

== Career in Venezuela ==
In Venezuela, Andújar taught literacy at the Seminary College of Caracas. In 1794 he was assigned to the understaffed Llanos de Caracas Capuchin mission, and he arrived to La Guaira in April 1795. He was procurator at the mission from 1795 to 1799. He opened an Academy of Mathematics in 1798 during the captain generalship of Pedro Carbonell Pinto Vigo y Correa. He had 18 students, including Feliciano Montenegro Colón, Cristóbal Rojas, and Juan Vicente Bolívar Palacios. It is not known how long he led the school but it is known he requested expansions into diverse subjects. De Andújar was part of the local entourage of Alexander von Humboldt in Venezuela, meeting him in Caracas and accompanying him to the Apure River, and receiving his praise for his knowledge. At Miguel José Sanz's house, he taught Simón Bolívar science and mathematics before he left Caracas in 1798. He moved, as a priest, to Barinas in 1800, then to Angostura in 1812, and to Parapara in 1815. He died there on 19 November 1818.

His former student José de la Cruz Limardo favorably wrote about his method of instruction, which notably did not include flagellation, saying he only needed a year and a half of instruction for fluency in reading, oratory, writing, and arithmetic.

His library and instruments were looted and destroyed during the Venezuelan War of Independence.
