= Eloy Palacios =

Venezuelan sculptor (1847–1919)

- Eloy Palacios Cabello
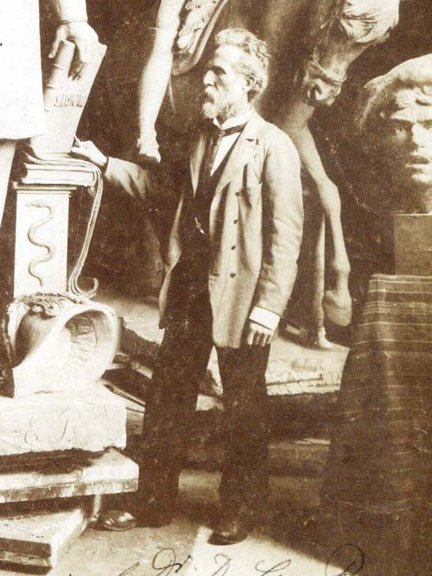
- Born: Eloy Palacios Cabello; June 25, 1847; Maturín, Monagas, Venezuela
- Died: December 12, 1919 (aged 72); Havana, Cuba
- Education: Academy of Fine Arts, Munich
- Known for: Sculpture, public monuments
- Notable work: Statue of José María Vargas (Caracas), Monument to José Félix Ribas (La Victoria), Statue of Simón Bolívar (Maracaibo and Cartagena), Monument to La India (Caracas), Monument to José Antonio Páez (Caracas), Monument to Jesús Jiménez Zamora (Cartago, Costa Rica)
- Parent(s): Félix Palacios and Margarita Cabello
- Memorials: Escuela Técnica de Artes Plásticas Eloy Palacios

Eloy Palacios Cabello (June 25, 1847 - December 12, 1919), was a Venezuelan artist, sculptor.

He was born in Maturín, Monagas, Venezuela to Félix Palacios and Margarita Cabello. He studied at the Academy of Fine Arts of Munich. He returned to Caracas in 1873. After Antonio Guzmán Blanco was offended by a commissioned portrait that Palacios made of him, Palacios was exiled in 1874 to Trinidad, Costa Rica and Germany. Eloy Palacios died in Havana, Cuba on December 12, 1919. The Escuela Técnica de Artes Plásticas Eloy Palacios was named in his honor.

== Important works ==
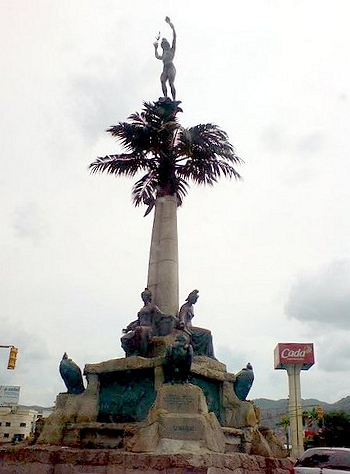
Monument to Carabobo

- Statue of José María Vargas, Vargas Hospital, Caracas.
- Monument to José Félix Ribas, La Victoria.
- Statue of Simón Bolívar, Plaza Bolívar, Maracaibo (copia de una realizada previamente para la ciudad de Cartagena de Indias, en Colombia)
- Statue of José Antonio Páez, Plaza Páez, Caracas.
- Monument to La India, sector Paraiso, Caracas.
- Monumento to Jesús Jiménez Zamora (Cartago, Costa Rica) Guillermo Brenes Tencio
- Statue to Luisa Otoya de Amerling (San José, Cementerio General, Costa Rica)
