= Battle of Victoria =

Battle of Victoria may refer to:

- Battle of Vitoria, Spain, 1813
- One of two fictional battles during the Bloody Valentine War in the Mobile Suit Gundam SEED anime metaseries

== See also ==
- Battle of La Victoria (disambiguation)
