= Bolivarian University of Venezuela =

State university in Caracas, Venezuela

Coordinates: 10°29′15″N 66°53′9″W

- Universidad Bolivariana de Venezuela
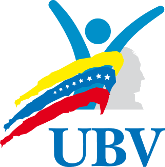
- Type: Public
- Established: 2003
- Rector: Yadira Cordoba
- Students: 180,000 (as of 2006)
- Location: Caracas, Venezuela
- Website: ubv.edu.ve

The Universidad Bolivariana de Venezuela (UBV, English: Bolivarian University of Venezuela) is a state university in Venezuela founded in 2003 by decree of President Hugo Chávez.

The UBV is a part of the Chávez government's "Mission Sucre" social programs, which aim to provide free higher education. Consequently, enrollment at the UBV is free and open to all. The government expects the student body to grow to 1 million by 2009, with more than 190 satellite classrooms throughout Venezuela.

The education programme at the UBV is generally in line with Hugo Chávez's socialist vision of a Latin American "Bolivarian Revolution". Opposition leader Julio Borges though, labels it a "thinly disguised propaganda factory that takes advantage of the country's most vulnerable citizens". However, others are more optimistic. Maria Ejilda Castellano, the rector of the Bolivarian University in Caracas, has said that the institution is designed to benefit the citizens precisely by encouraging the open exchange of ideas. Castellano said that the Bolivarian University is based on UNESCO principles for education and that "The professional produced by this institution will work for the transformation of society. She will be a critical thinker who can stimulate others and generate questions."

== Courses ==
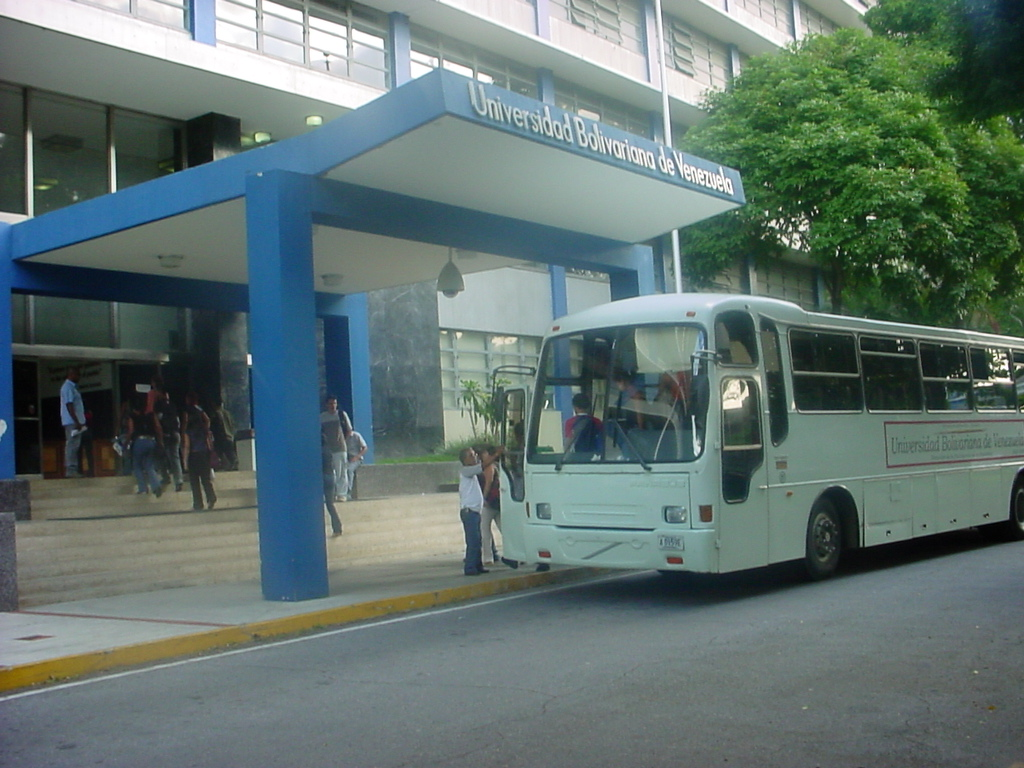
The UBV's main campus in Los Chaguaramos, Caracas.

The following courses are offered at UBV:

- Agroecology (Agroecología)
- Architecture (Arquitectura)
- Social Communication (Comunicación Social)
- Education (Educación)
- Animation (Animación)
- Environmental Management (Gestión Ambiental)
- Social Management of Local Development (Gestión Social del Desarrollo Local)
- Public Health Management (Gestión de la Salud Pública)
- Medicine (Medicina)
- Information Technology for Social Management (Informática para la Gestión Social)
- Law (Estudios Jurídicos)
- Political Science (Estudios Políticos y de Gobierno)

== Locales ==
The University will have branches in the most important regions in Venezuela. At the present time there are branches in:

- Caracas
- Punto Fijo
- Maturín
- Ciudad Bolívar
- Maracaibo
- Ciudad Guayana
- Barinitas
- Maracay
- San Cristóbal

=== Student acceptance ===
Candidate students must be high-school graduates. As distinguished from the rest of Venezuelan universities, they are assigned by the Mission Sucre. As of January 2011, the UBV has awarded over 120,000 degrees.
