= Simón Rodríguez =

Venezuelan educator, philosopher and politician (1769–1854)

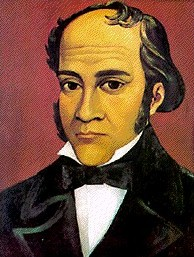
- Born: October 28, 1769; Caracas, Venezuela
- Died: February 28, 1854 (aged 84); Amotape, Peru
- Occupations: Philosopher and educator

Signature
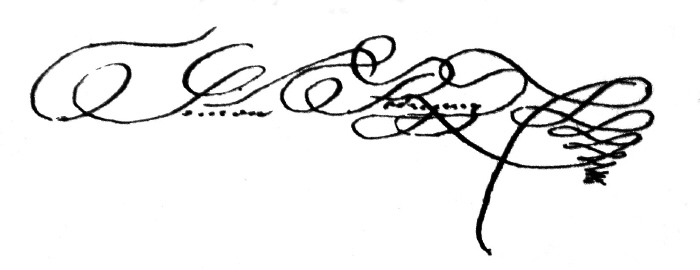

Simón Rodríguez (October 28, 1769, Caracas, Venezuela – February 28, 1854, Amotape, Peru), known during his exile from Spanish America as Samuel Robinson, was a Venezuelan philosopher and educator, notably Simón Bolívar's tutor and mentor.

His mother, Rosalia Rodríguez, was the daughter of an owner of farms and livestock; her father was originally from the Canary Islands.

== Career in Venezuela ==
In May 1791, the Caracas Council (Cabildo) gave him a position as teacher in the "Reading and Writing School for Children". In 1794, he presented his critical writing Reflection on the flaws vitiating the Reading and Writing School for Children in Caracas and Means of Achieving its Reform and a New Establishment to the council, which represented an original approach to a modern school system. His role in the failed Gual and España conspiracy against the Spanish crown in 1797 forced him to leave Venezuela.

== Exile ==
In Kingston, Jamaica he changed his name to Samuel Robinson, and after staying some years in the United States he traveled to France (1801). There, in 1804, he met his former protégé, Simón Bolivar; together they made a long journey across Europe. They witnessed the coronation of Napoleon Bonaparte in Milan, as King of Italy and in Rome, witnessed how Bolívar took his famous oath that he would liberate all of America from the Spanish Crown, and registered it for history: "I swear before you; I swear on my parent’s God; I swear on them; I swear on my honor; and I swear on my Motherland; that I won’t give rest to my arm, nor repose to my soul, until I have broken the chains that oppress us by will of the Spanish power."

Rodríguez returned to America in 1823, using his name "Simón Rodríguez" again. In Colombia he established the first workshop-school in 1824. He was called to Peru by Simón Bolívar and became "Director for Public Education, Physical and Mathematical Sciences and Arts" and "Director of Mines, Agriculture and Public Roads" of Bolivia.

In 1826, Rodríguez established a second workshop-school, as part of a project for all Bolivia. But Antonio José de Sucre, president of Bolivia since October 1826, did not have a good relationship with him, and Rodríguez resigned the same year, working during the rest of his life as educator and writer, living alternatively in different places of Peru, Chile and Ecuador. His work Sociedades Americanas (American Societies) was divided in several issues and published in Arequipa (1828), in Concepción (1834), Valparaíso (1838), and Lima (1842).

== Last years and legacy ==
Most of Rodríguez's written works remained in Guayaquil, Ecuador, but were lost in the large city fire of 1896.

Rodriguez is the face on the 50 Bolivar Fuerte bills. He was also the face in the old 20,000 Bolívar bills (until 2007).

One of the Bolivarian Missions of Hugo Chávez, Mission Robinson, took its name from his alias. There is also a train station named after him in Charallave.

== Tribute ==
On October 28, 2018, Rodríguez was honoured with a Google Doodle posthumously on his 249th birthday.

== Sources ==
- Consuelo Hernández. "Simón Rodríguez y la crítica", El Nacional. August 7, 1982
- Consuelo Hernández."Simón Rodríguez visto en la perspectiva del tiempo", Revista de la Universidad Simón Rodríguez. Año III. No. 4 (1982), pp. 21–33.
