= Ángel Cappelletti =

Argentine philosopher

Angel Cappelletti
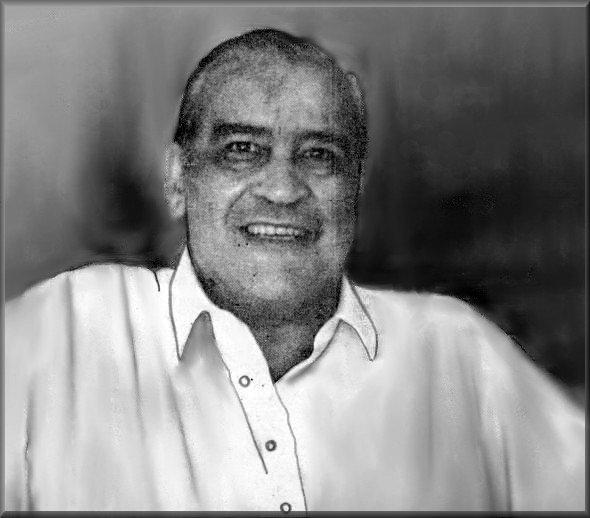
- Born: March 15, 1927; Rosario, Santa Fe
- Died: November 25, 1995; Ibid.

Ángel Cappelletti (March 15, 1927– November 25, 1995) was a philosopher and university professor. He was born in Rosario. He studied philosophy at the Universidad Nacional de Buenos Aires where he also received his PhD in 1954. He moved to Venezuela in 1968 and began teaching at the Simon Bolivar University until his retirement in 1994, when he returned to Rosario. During his career he translated works from Greek and Latin and composed numerous works on ancient philosophy as well as on the subjects as positivism and anarchism in Latin America.

== Works ==
- Los fragmentos de Heráclito (1962)
- Utopías Antiguas y modernas (1966)
- El socialismo utópico (Rosario, 1968)
- La filosofía de Heráclito de Efeso (1970)
- Inicios de la filosofía griega (1972)
- Cuatro filósofos de la Alta Edad Media (1972, 1993)
- Introducción a Séneca (1973)
- Introducción a Condillac (1974)
- Los fragmentos de Diógenes de Apolonia (1975)
- La teoría aristotélica de la visión (1977)
- Ciencia jónica y pitagórica (1980)
- Protágoras: naturaleza y cultura (1987)
- Sobre tres diálogos menores de Platón (1987)
- Noias de filosofía griega (1990)
- La estética Griega (1991, 2000)
- Positivismo y evolucionismo en Venezuela (1992)
- Textos y estudios de filosofía medieval (1993)
- Estado y poder político en el pensamiento moderno (1994)
- Bakunin y el Socialismo Libertario (1986)
- El pensamiento de Malatesta (Montevideo, 1990)
- La teoría de la propiedad en Proudhon y otros momentos del pensamiento anarquista (Mexico, 1980)
- El pensamiento de Kropotkin (Madrid, 1978)
- Etapas del pensamiento socialista (Madrid, 1978)
- Francisco Ferrer y la pedagogía libertaria (Madrid, 1980)
- Prehistoria del anarquismo (Madrid, 2006)
- Hechos y figuras del anarquismo hispanoamericano (Móstoles, 1991)
- Utopías y antiutopías después Marx (Montevideo,1997)
- El anarquismo en America Latina (Caracas, 1990) with Carlos Rama.

Translations:

- Séneca: De brevitae vitae (1959)
- Epístolas pseudos-heraclíteas (1960)
- Abelardo: Ética (1966)
- Platón: Georgias (1967).
