= Battle of Urica =

1814 battle in the Venezuelan War of Independence

- Part of Venezuelan War of Independence
Date	5 December 1814
Location	Urica, Anzoátegui 9.714°N 64.008°W
Result	Royalist victory

Belligerents
United Provinces of Venezuela	Spanish Empire

Commanders and leaders
José Félix Ribas; José Francisco Bermúdez	José Tomás Boves †; Francisco Tomás Morales

Strength
4,000 men	7,000 men

Casualties and losses
800–1,500 dead 500 prisoners killed	800–1,000 dead
- Location within Venezuela

The Battle of Urica took place during the War of Venezuelan Independence in the village of Urica (in modern-day Anzoátegui) on 5 December 1814, between the forces of Republican general in chief José Félix Ribas and Royalist caudillo José Tomás Boves. Although Boves died, the Royalists won the battle.

== Prelude ==
After the defeat in the Battle of Aragua de Barcelona, Simón Bolívar and Santiago Mariño were relieved of command by General Ribas on 2 September. In Cariaco he met with Colonel Manuel Piar, but mutual disagreements led them to divide their forces. Piar marched to Cumaná and was defeated by Boves in the Battle of El Salado on 16 October.

Ribas had to march to Maturín to join up with Republican Colonel José Francisco Bermúdez. Together they decided to march to Urica to finish off Francisco Tomás Morales, Boves' second, who had previously been defeated by Bermúdez in the Fourth Battle of Maturín. However, during the march they learned of Boves' proximity.

Ribas decided to retreat but Bermúdez refused and fought Boves in the Battle of Los Magüeyes on 9 November. The colonel was defeated and his forces dispersed, weakening the Republicans. After this battle, Bermúdez and his defeated army joined Ribas in Maturín.
In the meantime, Boves and his troops had linked up with the forces commanded by his lieutenant, Francisco Tomás Morales, in Urica.

Ribas for the Republicans commanded a force of 2,000, including José Tadeo Monagas, Pedro Zaraza, Manuel Cedeño, and Francisco Parejo. The Republican force deployed in three columns at dawn on December 5 on a plain near the town of Urica.

== The battle ==
Boves led the first attack, targeting Bermúdez's column. This attack was repulsed, and heavy artillery fire inflicted casualties on the Royalist forces. Ribas ordered an attack and successfully encircled Boves' column on the Royalist right.

Boves, finding his column surrounded, led an attack by 400 cavalry in an attempt to break the Republican lines, but was killed in the fighting. The remaining unengaged Royalist columns encircled the Republicans, sealing a Royalist victory, although with heavy casualties on both sides.

== Aftermath ==
Boves' death had far-reaching consequences. He was succeeded by Morales, but in the long run the llaneros he had led joined the Republican cause under the leadership of José Antonio Páez following efforts by the Republican criollo elite to attract mixed-race and lower class Venezuelans to the cause of independence.

== See also ==
- José Tomás Boves
- Second Republic of Venezuela
