= Concha Liaño =

Spanish anarchist (1916–2014)

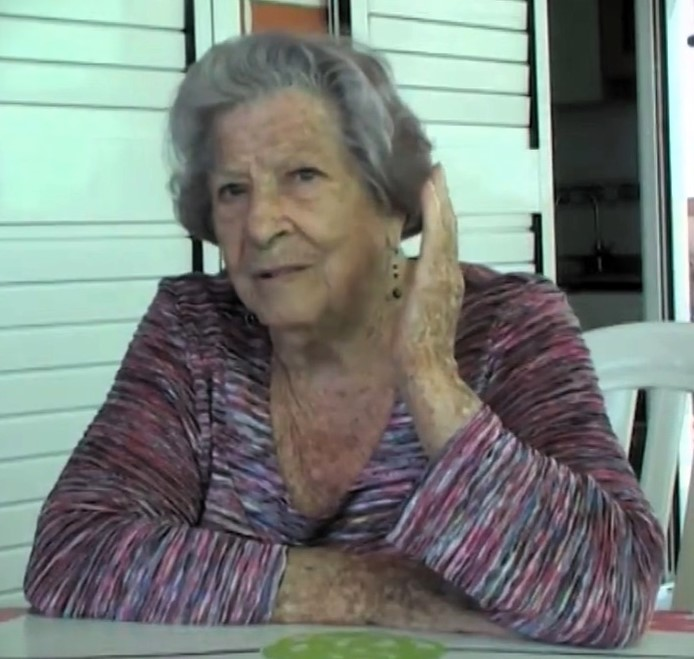
- Liaño interviewed in 2009
- Born: Concepción Liaño Gil; 24 November 1916; Épinay-sur-Seine, Paris, France
- Died: 19 April 2014 (aged 97); Caracas, Venezuela
- Organization(s): Mujeres Libres; Juventudes Libertarias
- Movement: Anarchist feminism

Concepción Liaño Gil (24 November 1916 – 19 April 2014), commonly known as Concha Liaño, was a Spanish anarchist feminist who participated in the Spanish Revolution of 1936 and was a founder of the Mujeres Libres movement.

== Biography ==
Concha Liaño was born on 24 September 1914, in the Parisian suburb of Épinay-sur-Seine, to Spanish parents. Liaño spent her childhood in Barcelona, where she studied at the Lycée Français. At the age of 15, she joined the Libertarian Youth.

In 1935, together with other libertarian women, she founded the Agrupación Cultural Femenina. The magazine Mujeres Libres already existed in Madrid, and the coincidence of approaches led to the merger of the two initiatives into the Federación Nacional de Mujeres Libres (English: National Federation of Free Women). Concha Liaño and Soledad Estorach were responsible for the extension of this feminist movement in Catalonia. Although it was established with the intent of being "the women's movement of the CNT", according to Concha Liaño, both the CNT and the Libertarian Youth were reticent towards this women's movement, which they treated with a certain condescension: "We pretended to be the women's movement of the CNT, but they didn't accept us. Now, so many years later, they accept us. Then machismo, like now, was something genetic. During the war we were treated with great difficulty, but yes, they helped us, with difficulty, but they did. That was the mentality back then".

After the outbreak of the Spanish Civil War, she was a member of the Revolutionary Committee of the Barcelona neighbourhood of Sant Martí de Provençals and of the Libertarian Youth of the Hospital de San Pedro. In 1937, she was editor of the Mujeres Libres magazine.

Following the defeat of the Spanish Republic in 1939, Concha Liaño went into exile in France. Along with other Spanish refugees, she was confined in one of the French concentration camps established by the French authorities, but she managed to escape to Paris.

Grief over the defeat of the Republic drove her into an emotional crisis, culminating in 1941, with a suicide attempt. In 1943, she moved to Bordeaux. There she collaborated with the French Resistance during Nazi occupation of France. After the war ended, she moved to Venezuela in 1948 with her only daughter, then five years old. She worked as an airline employee in Maracaibo and later moved to Caracas, where she lived in a modest flat in the city centre. Following the Bolivarian Revolution, Liaño became a supporter of Venezuelan president Hugo Chávez, who she described as a "Godsend".

In 1996 she was one of the protagonists of the documentary Vivir la utopía, and that same year the filmmaker Vicente Aranda was inspired by Concha Liaño and the Mujeres Libres to make his film Libertarias, in which one of the protagonists is named after Concha Liaño. However, Concha Liaño was very critical of the film. Her testimony also forms part of the book Nosotras que perdimos la paz (2005) by Llum Quiñonero.

Liaño died in Caracas on 19 April 2014.
