= Coto Paúl =

Lawyer, orator, and officer who fought in the Venezuelan War of Independence

Francisco Antonio Paúl Terreros
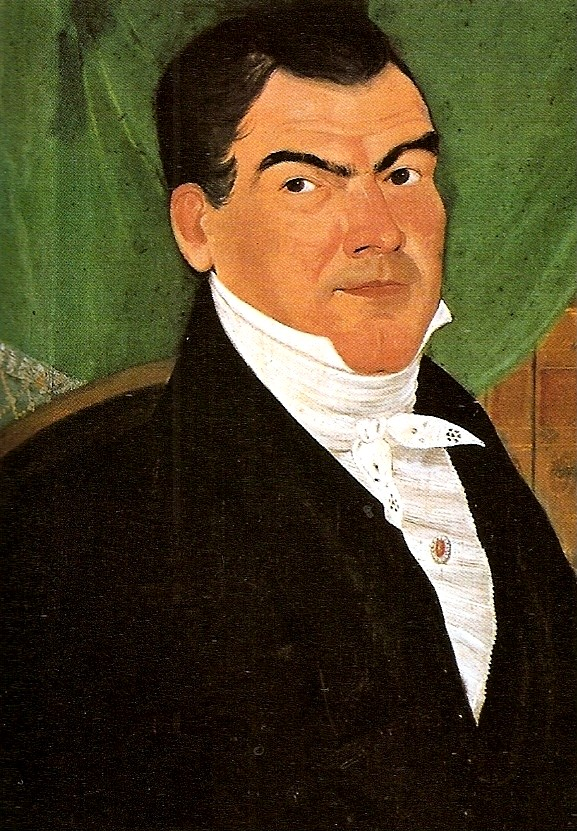
- Coto Paúl by Juan Lovera, 1820
- Born: 2 August 1773; Caracas, Viceroyalty of New Granada
- Died: 1821 (aged 47–48); Near Riohacha
- Education: University of Caracas

Francisco Antonio Paúl Terreros, better known as Coto Paúl, (2 August 1773 – 1821) was a lawyer, orator, and officer who fought in the Venezuelan War of Independence. A member of the Patriotic Society, he served in administrative roles in the First Republic of Venezuela, Second Republic of Venezuela, and United Provinces of New Granada. He served the lattermost until his death from malaria in 1821.

He was nicknamed Coto Paúl because of his goiter, which is sometimes called a coto in Spanish.

== Personal life ==
Francisco Antonio Paúl Terreros was born on 2 August 1773 in Caracas in what was then the Viceroyalty of New Granada. He had six siblings, but only he and his brother and fellow revolutionary Felipe Fermín Paúl Terreros received higher education. He studied law at the University of Caracas and became a lawyer in 1807.

He had two legitimate daughters, Emilia and Magdalena de Paúl y Almeida.

== Career ==
He joined the Patriotic Society in 1810. When the First Republic of Venezuela was established, he was made the prosecutor of the High Court of Justice and of the Royal Treasury. This state would eventually capitulate, and the Second Republic was formed not long after. Here, Coto Paúl was the Governor of Caracas. He fought at the Battle Vigirima, Battle of Araure, and Battle of Cojedes. After the fall of the Second Republic, he fled to Curacao with other rebels.

Returning from exile, he became the War Auditor for the United Provinces of New Granada in the Magdalena Campaign, with his commander Mariano Montilla unable to find a suitable military role for him. He did, however, fight in the siege of Cartagena de Indias. He was shortly thereafter infected with malaria and died.

At a celebration of the anniversary of the start of the Venezuelan War of Independence hosted by the Patriotic Society, Coto Paúl delivered a now-famous speech where he extolled anarchism. He said:

Anarchy! It is the freedom to escape from tyranny, untie your belt and your flowing hair. Anarchy! When the gods of the weak, distrusting, and fearful curse her, I fall to my knees in her presence. ¡Señores! May anarchy, with the torch of the furies in hand, guide us to discussion, so that its smoke intoxicates rebels against order so they follow it through the streets and plazas shouting ¡Libertad!

El anarquismo en América Latina records that Coto Paúl's anarchism may have been influenced by Sylvain Maréchal.
