= Simón Sáez Mérida =

Venezuelan politician (1928–2005)

Simón Sáez Mérida (October 30, 1928 – May 29, 2005) was a professor at the Central University of Venezuela, as well as a union leader and a revolutionary. He was known for being a leftist revolutionary and for founding the Movimiento de Izquierda Revolucionaria. He was killed in 2005 when a robber threw a piece of steel through the windshield of his vehicle.

== Early life ==
Mérida was born in 1928 in Maturín. In his youth he read Marx and admired Fidel Castro.

== Revolutionary activity ==
=== Democratic Action ===
In 1949, Mérida joined the Democratic Action party and assisted its exiled leaders by directing the group's armed resistance activities from inside the country. Mérida eventually became their general secretary after uniting the group with the Venezuelan communists. This resulted in his detention in 1954, which eventually led to his exile in 1956. In 1958, he reentered the country clandestinely to participate in the overthrow of Marcos Pérez Jiménez.

=== Revolutionary Left Movement ===
In 1960, Mérida left the Democratic Action party to found the Movimiento de Izquierda Revolucionaria. He was then elected to the National Assembly. At the same time, he was organizing an armed insurrection against Rómulo Betancourt. In May 1962, he participated in the El Carupanazo rebellion, which resulted in his imprisonment in 1964. This ended with Mérida being exiled to Europe in 1959. However, later in 1959, the government of Venezuela instituted the Democratic Pacification Program, which granted leftist revolutionaries amnesty, and allowed him to return to the country.

== Later years ==
Mérida spent his time after his return to the country focused on teaching, the union, and on editing leftist magazines. His editing work included Reventon, Al Mar-gen, and F27. In 1998 he voted for Hugo Chavez, but two years later accused him of being "a continuation of the past" and a neoliberal who was only concerned with continuing Rafael Caldera's agenda. This resulted in Merida being condemned by the Bolivarian government.

== Death ==
On April 23, 2005, a would-be robber threw a hunk of steel through the windshield of Merida's vehicle as he travelled through Caracas on the Valle-Coche highway. The metal destroyed his jaw and, after 37 days in intensive care, he succumbed to his injuries.

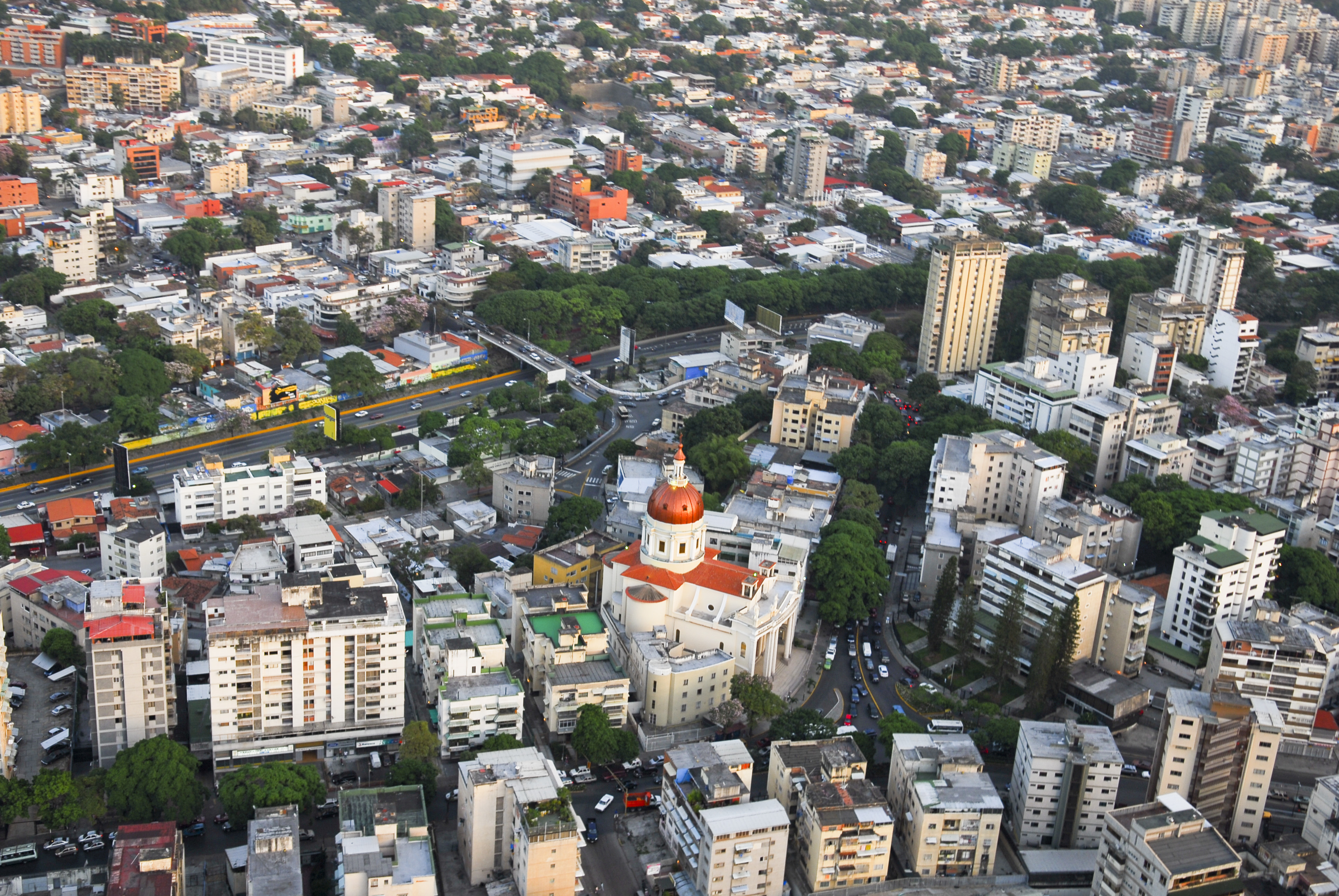
The Valle-Coche highway as it passes through Caracas, Venezuela.
