= Decree 1011 =

Presidential Decree 1011
- Date effective: Failed to become effective
- Location: Venezuela
- Author(s): Hugo Chávez
- Subject: Education

Presidential Decree 1011 (Spanish: Decreto Presidencial 1011), better known simply as Decree 1011, was an October 2000 presidential decree in Venezuela promoted by President Hugo Chávez whose text partially modified the Regulations for the Exercise of the Teaching Profession by creating a new administrative figure, that of itinerant supervisors. The decree was very controversial and generated the first strong opposition movement against President Chávez, which mobilized tens of thousands of people from the civil society during the rest of 2000 to protest against the decree under the slogan "don't mess with my children". Despite the insistence with the implementation of the decree, it could not be put into practice due to its opposition and criticism by the civil society.

== Content ==
In October 2000, Hugo Chávez promoted the Presidential Decree 1011 whose text partially modified the Regulations for the Exercise of the Teaching Profession by creating a new administrative figure, that of itinerant supervisors, which partially modified the Regulations for the Exercise of the Teaching Profession and created the figure of National Itinerant Supervisors in educational institutions, who could be appointed directly by the Minister of Education, Culture and Sports. Their authorities and functions included reporting, accountability directly to the Minister of Education and even the appointment and removal of their directors. The decree also allowed Cuban teachers to participate in literacy plans in Venezuela.

The decree was controversial and generated the first opposition movement to the government of Hugo Chávez, which mobilized tens of thousands of people from civil society during the rest of the year 2000 to protest against the decree under the slogan "don't mess with my children" (Spanish: Con mis hijos no te metas.). Civil groups and private sectors filed nullity actions before the Supreme Court of Justice against the creation of official supervisors; such legal actions were dismissed by the Supreme Court. On 1 April 2001, in the television program Aló Presidente, he asked how the groups would react to the Education Law "if they scream for a decree" which establishes the supervision of schools. He declared that "he who does not owe it does not fear it" and therefore questioned the opposition of those "very small sectors" that participate in mobilizations such as the one carried out on 31 March in Caracas. Despite the insistence with the implementation of the decree, it could not be put into practice due to the opposition and the criticism of the civil society.

== See also ==
- Education in Venezuela
