= Patriotic Society (Venezuela) =

Patriotic Society Sociedad Patriótica
- Founder: Juan Germán Roscio
- Founded: 1810
- Dissolved: 1812
- Headquarters: Caracas, Venezuela
- Ideology: Patriotism, Republicanism, Separatism

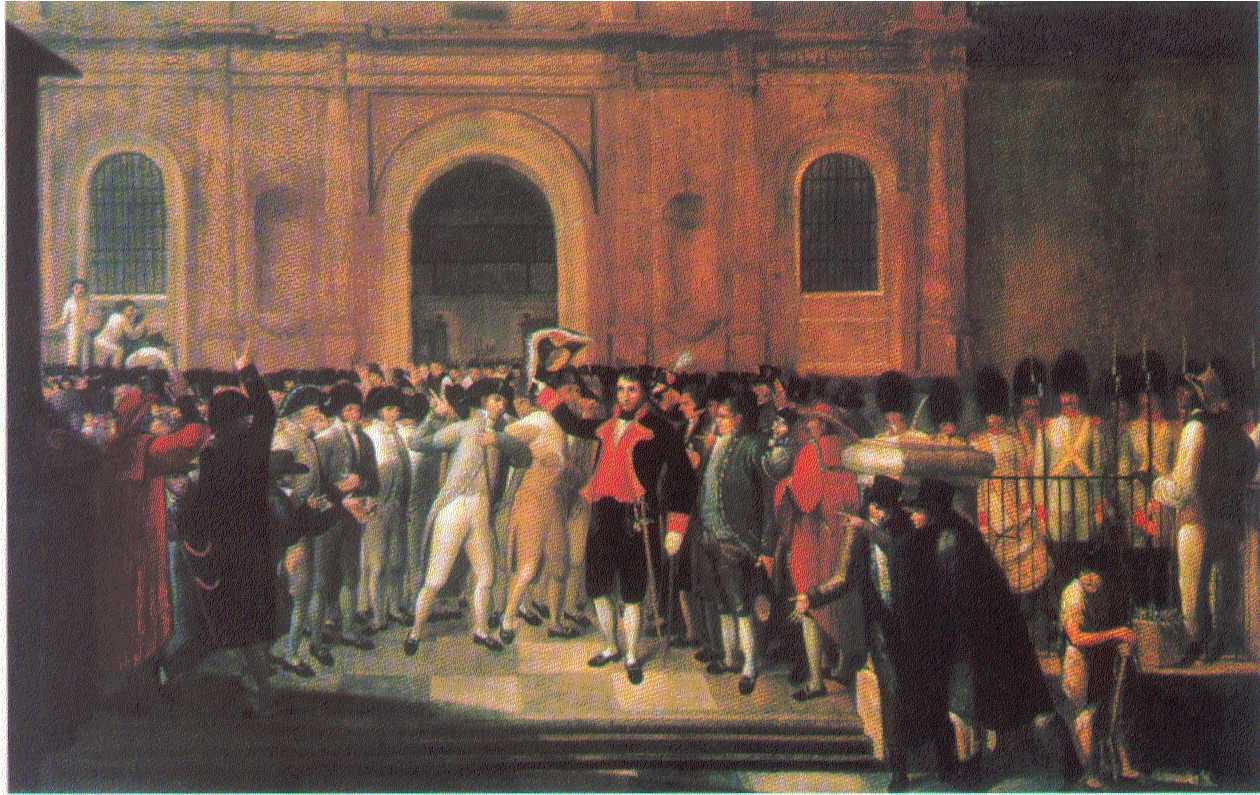

The Patriotic Society (Spanish: Sociedad Patriótica) was an organization under the Spanish Empire dedicated to Venezuelan independence. It was founded in July 1810 by Juan Germán Roscio after the Revolution of 19 April 1810. It amassed large influence in the country and abroad, dictating much of the early Venezuelan War of Independence. The organization ceased operations shortly after the Venezuelan Declaration of Independence, when most of its membership joined the militia army of the First Republic of Venezuela.

The society itself was organized in a manner similar to the Jacobins. It had a consistently changing presidency. Some presidents included: Francisco Espejo, Francisco de Miranda, and Antonio Muñoz Tébar.

The Patriotic Society had itself a newspaper organ called El Patriota de Venezuela, where it disseminated messages in line with the organization's policies.

Its members were called "socios", which can be translated to "members" or "associates".

== History ==
=== Background ===
The Patriotic Society was established in 1810 amidst Venezuela's growing aspirations for independence from Spanish colonial rule. Founded by figures Simon Bolivar and Francisco de Miranda, it was formed during a time of discontent with colonial governance. Inspired by Enlightenment principles and the revolutions across Spanish America, Bolivar and Miranda aimed to rally Venezuelans behind the cause of liberty. Serving as a place for political discussions and organizing revolutionary activities, the society played a crucial role in independence. Its establishment marked a milestone in Venezuela's pursuit of freedom.

=== Influence and organization ===
Founded as the Sociedad de Agricultura y Economía, the society quickly promoted separatism. It advocated for separatism and pressured the First National Congress into action. The organization quickly accrued high-profile (or soon to be high-profile) members, amassing approximately 600 members in Caracas alone at a point.

According to statesman and member of the society Coto Paúl, the power of the society was such that revolutionary Venezuela had "two congresses": the First National Congress of Venezuela, and the Patriotic Society.

The Patriotic Society had its headquarters in Caracas, and branches in Barcelona, Barinas, Valencia and Puerto Cabello. Its meetings discussed economics, politics, religious, and civil and military affairs.

== Notable members ==
Below are members who would gain fame or recognition during the Venezuelan War of Independence:

- Francisco de Miranda
- José Félix Ribas
- Antonio Muñoz Tébar
- Vicente Salias
- Francisco José Ribas
- Simón Bolívar
- Miguel José Sanz
- Casiano de Medranda
- Francisco Antonio Paúl
- Carlos Soublette
