= José Félix Ribas =

Venezuelan revolutionary (1775–1815)

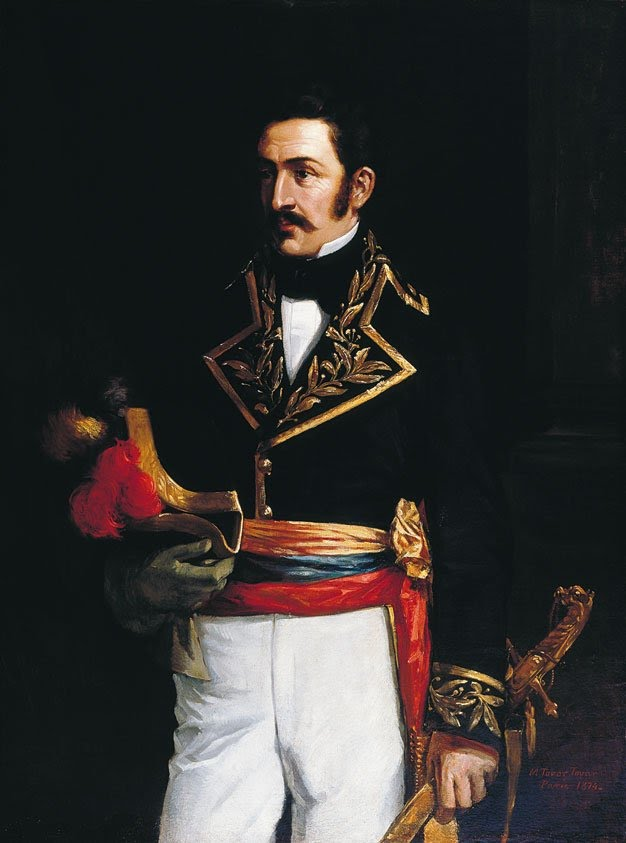
- Painting by Martín Tovar y Tovar
- Born: 19 September 1775; Caracas, Viceroyalty of New Granada
- Died: 31 January 1815 (aged 39); Tucupido, Viceroyalty of New Granada
- Relatives: Simón Bolívar (nephew-in-law)
- Awards: Order of the Liberators

José Félix Ribas (Spanish pronunciation: [xoˈse ˈfeliɣs ˈriβas]; Caracas, 19 September 1775 – Tucupido, 31 January 1815) was a Venezuelan independence leader and hero of the Venezuelan War of Independence.

== Early life ==
Ribas was the last of eleven sons, born to a prominent Caracas family. In his early years, he received a quality education and attended the city's seminary. After finishing his studies, he began working in the agrarian sector. At the age of 21 he married María Josefa Palacios, the aunt of Simón Bolívar. He soon became interested in Republican ideals and sympathetic to the revolutionary independence movement.

Ribas became involved in the Conspiracy of 1808, but was taken prisoner after its failure. In his defense, he stated that on the day of the action, he was just heading to a public square to spend time. Actually, Ribas was frequenting the square to meet with other republicans to plan an uprising. He was later freed by the authorities.

When the Revolution of 19 April 1810 was taking place, it was reported that Ribas was seen travelling throughout the entire city, encouraging people to join-in the demonstrations against Spanish rule. In the aftermath he joined the interim government on April 25, taking charge of the municipality of Caracas.

== Military career ==
Apart from his political functions in the interim government, and despite having no military background, Ribas was named Colonel of the Barlovento Battalion which he helped set up with his own funds. He also maintained some contact with Francisco de Miranda, and offered him all possible support when Miranda arrived in the country. Along with other fellow Republicans, he became a member of the Sociedad Patriótica organized by Francisco de Miranda, in contradistinction to the New Venezuelan Congress which was ruled mostly by the landed few. The Sociedad Patriótica was modeled after a French Jacobin Club, encouraging the practice of oratory on equality of rights to all citizens.

During a brief period of Venezuelan independence (the Second Republic of Venezuela under the stewardship of Simón Bolívar), Ribas fought in numerous battles of the "Campaña Admirable"; however the most crucial episode was the battle of La Victoria (12 February 1814) in which he and his comrades succeeded in foiling the advance of José Tomás Boves's formidable royalist forces (commanded in this battle by proxy Francisco Tomás Morales, while Boves recovered from wounds). Ribas won this victory with inexperienced troops, composed mainly of youths, students, and seminary candidates that Ribas has succeeded in recruiting. Ribas told his young soldiers, his charges, before a crucial battle that "We have no choice between victory or death, we must achieve victory" ("No podemos optar entre vencer o morir, es necesario vencer"). After many hours of fierce resistance, Republican reinforcements arrived under the command of Vicente Campo Elías. It is in honor of this episode of Venezuelan history that modern Venezuelan citizens now celebrate the "Día de la Juventud" ("Day of Youth"). each 12 February.

== Capture and death after Urica and Maturín ==
He fought vigorously in the Battle of Urica in which the republican forces lost but his royalist nemesis Boves was killed. After this battle, his forces assisted in offering a last desperate resistance to Morales at the Fifth Battle of Maturín; however this effort also was defeated. Ribas, together with a nephew and a faithful servant, was forced to flee from the victorious royalists. However, he was ultimately betrayed to the royalists by a slave. He was captured and executed by beheading. Ribas's lopped off head, after having been fried in cooking oil, was sent to Caracas. There, it was placed in public display within a small cage with the intention of demoralizing the patriots.

== Legacy ==
Almost two centuries later, Ribas' deeds were commemorated by the Hugo Chávez government when it named one of the Bolivarian Missions "Missión Ribas" in his honor. There are also two Venezuelan municipalities named after him, José Félix Ribas Municipality, Aragua state; and José Félix Ribas Municipality, Guárico state.

He appears as a Comandante General in Sid Meier's Civilization VI, available only to users playing as the Gran Colombia civilization.

== See also ==
- History of Venezuela
- Venezuelan War of Independence
- Military career of Simón Bolívar
- Spanish American wars of independence
