= Consuelo Hernández (poet) =

American poet (born 1952)

- Born: 1952 (age 73–74); El Peñol, Antioquia, Colombia
- Occupations: Poet, literary critic, professor, scholar
- Writing career
- Language: Spanish, English
- Genres: Poetry, literary criticism

Consuelo Hernández (born 1952) is a Colombian American poet, scholar, literary critic and associate professor of Latin American studies at American University since 1995.

She has received an "Antonio Machado" Award for the poem "Polifonía sobre rieles" among participants from 29 countries in Madrid, Spain, on October 17, 2011. She is a finalist at the international poetry contest of "Ciudad Melilla" in Spain and at the concurso "Letras de Oro" at the University of Miami. In 2003 she received an award from the Salvadoran Consulate in New York City for her poetry. In 2005 her poetry collection Manual de peregrina was included in the Special Library's collection at American University. She has read her poetry in the International Poetry Festival of Medellín, the Library of Congress, the New York Public Library, the Haskell Center, the Folger Shakespeare Library, the Fundación Pablo Neruda in Chile, the Agencia Española de Cooperación Internacional in Madrid and Barcelona, Spain, the King Juan Carlos I of Spain Center, New York University, the University of Kentucky, the City University of New York, the University of Pécs in Hungary, and many other venues. Her poetry has been included in numerous anthologies in Latin America, Europe, Canada and the United States.

A worldwide traveler, since 1977 she left her native Colombia, lived in several countries and has visited more than thirty. She has earned a PhD from New York University, an MA from the Universidad Simón Bolívar (Caracas, Venezuela), and a BA from the Universidad de Antioquia (Medellín, Colombia).

== Academic distinctions ==
- Mid-Atlantic Council of Latin American Studies, James Street Prize in recognition for Scholarly Excellence and the best article published in the 2011 Volume 24 of Latin American Essays
- Mentor Appreciation Certificate. Preparing Future Faculty Program to Help Doctoral and Master Students Meet the Responsibilities of Teaching, Research and Service. Arizona State University
- Celia Siegel Award for Excellence in Teaching. Graduate School of Sciences and Arts, New York University
- Ciarf Wagner Fellowship for Research Excellence. New York University
- Nominated for the Dr. Carol S. Russet Award. Westchester/Rockland Region of the American Council on Education/National Identification Program for the Advancement of Women in Higher Education Administration
- Declared Honor Guest in El Salvador" by the Mayor and the Council. El Salvador
- NEH Summer scholarship. Claremont Graduate University, CA
- Scholarship Summer at El Escorial awarded by Universidad Complutense, Madrid Spain
- Graduate Student Award for Academic Achievement, New York University
- Graduate Faculty Award. American University.
- Elected Chair of the Spanish Department at Manhattanville College,1994

== Poetry collections ==
- Voces de la Soledad (1982)
- Solo de violin. Poemario para músicos y pintores (1997)
- Manual de peregrina (2004)
- Poemas de escombros y cenizas / Poems from Debris and Ashes (2006)
- Polifonía sobre rieles (2011)
- Poetry in April. Latino-American Poets.Antología 2015 (2015.)Co-edited with Chip Gerfen.
- Mi reino sin orillas (2011)
- El tren de la muerte (2018)
- Wake of Chance / Estela del azar (2021)
- Mordiendo la penumbra (2025)

== Books on literary criticism ==
- Álvaro Mutis: una estética del deterioro. Caracas: Monte Ávila Editores, 1996
- Voces y perspectivas en la poesía latinoamericana del siglo XX. Madrid: Visor Libros and Agencia Internacional de Cooperación Española (2009)

Inclusions in anthologies

- Lengua del alma la pluma. Antología poética XXIII Maratón de Poesía del Teatro de la Luna. Ed. R. Berroa. Santo Domingo: Editorial Búo, 2015.
- In Arabic LanguageAnología de poetas colombianos. ED. Mushin Al-Rumbli. Irak, Bagdad: Amada Group. 2014
- Festival Latinoamiericano de poesía Ciudad de Nueva York. Antología 2014. Eds: Karla Coreas & Susana Reyes. New York: Urpi Editores, 2014.
- Include in the database Latino Literature: Poetry, Drama, and Fiction. 2012.
- "Consuelo Hernández. Razones Poéticas." Veinte veces luna es poesía. Ed. Rei Berroa. Santo Doming: Editorial Búo, 2012. 133–156.
- "Polifonía sobre rieles." Premios del Tren: Antonio Machado 2011. Madrid: Fundación de Ferrocarriles Españoles, 2012. 117–128.
- "Consuelo Hernández. Poemas" Al pie de la Casa Blanca. Poetas Hispanos de Washington, DC. Luis Alberto Ambroggio and Carlos Parada Ayala (eds.). New York: Academia Norteamericana de la Lengua Española, 2010. pp. 209–224
- Poetas para el siglo XXI. Fernando Sabido Sánchez d.). Web. 15 Nov. 2010.
- Poetassigloveintiuno
- Antología de literatura latina II. Ventana Abierta. Revista de Literatura, Arte y cultura. Centro de Estudios Chicanos y University of California, Santa Barbara. Vol. VII, No. 25, Otoño, 2008.
- Pegasos de dos siglos: Poesía en Kentucky 1977–2007. Special issue of Hispanic Poetry Review. Commemorating 30 years of University of Kentucky Foreign Languages Conference.
- Cut Loose the Body. An Anthology of Poems on Torture and Fernando Bolero's Abu Ghraib Paintings. Rose Mary Berger and Joseph Ross, editors. Washington: The Katzen American University Museum, CAS, and DC Poets against the War. 2007. pp. 17, 24.
- Red Mundial de Escritores en Español: Remes. Redescritorsespa.com
- Antología Poética. Voces y memorias. República Dominicana: Editorial Búho, 2006.
- Poetas en la Casa de la Luna. Margarito Cuéllar y Rei Berroa, editors. México: Editorial Verdahalago de la Universidad Nacional Autónoma de Nuevo León, 2005.
- Voces sin fronteras. Antología. Montreal, Québec, Canada Editions Alondras, 2006.
- Antología internacional de poesía amorosa. Santiago Risso, editor. Lima, Perú: Ediciones Alejo, 2006.
- Memoria poética. Tercer Encuentro Internacional de Poetas. El turno del Ofendido. Vladimir Baiza, et al., editors. El Salvador: Fundación Metáfora, 2006.
- Mujer soledad y violencia. Antología Literaria. Cali, Colombia: Editorial Gente con Talento, 2005. p. 20-33.
- Mujeres mirando al sur. Antología de poetas suramericanas en USA. Zulema Moret, editor. Madrid, Spain: Ediciones Torremozas, 2004. p. 122-136.
- El español en Estados Unidos. Breve Antología literaria. Special issue Ventana Abierta Revista Latina de Literatura Arte y Cultura. Vol. IV, No. 16. Vol. V, No. 17. Primavera / Otoño 2004. University of California at Santa Barbara.
- 10 Poetas Latinoamericanos en USA. New York: Editorial Sin Fronteras, 2003. pp 38–53.
- Cruzando puentes: Antología de literatura latina. Luis Leal y Víctor Fuentes, editors. University of California at Santa Bárbara: 2001–2002.
- Dialogue through Poetry. 2001 Anthology. Adrian Taylor, R. Devineni and L. Srivastava, editors. New York: Rattapallax Press & Fictionopolis. 2002. Dialoguepoetry.com. Includes poems from around the world that were read to celebrate the UN Dialogue among Civilizations through Poetry.
- "El mercado," "Los músicos de Jazz," "La barraca," "Las pinturas de Pippin," and "Noche de Jazz." Repertorio Internacional de Especialistas en la Africanía. 2nd edition. Universidad de Alcalá, Spain, 2001.
- 15 poetas colombianos en los Estados Unidos. Poesía migrante. Bogotá: El Tiempo, October 26, 1998. pp. 6–7.
- Colombian Writers in the United States. Special issue. Brújula y Compass. No. 31. Winter 1998. [A publication of The Latin American Writers Institute and Eugenio María de Hostos Community College of CUNY.]
- A Celebration of Poetry. A Compilation of the International Library of Poetry. Maryland: Owings Mills, 1998.
- Voices of America. Sistersville, West Virginia: Sparrowgrass Poetry Forum, 1997.

Book chapters and invited articles

- Poetizar la ciudad, transformar la ciudad." Prólogo. Muestra de poesía en Medellín 1950-2011.Castillo et al (eds). Medellín: Editorial Lealon, 2011. 22-39.
- "La poesía de Jesús Fernández Palacios." Signos y segmentos. Segunda antología. Madrid: Calambur Editorial y La Diputación de Cádiz. 2007. pp. 152–161.
- "Introducción. Mitología utopía y realidad en la poesía neoindigenista." Mitología. Tulio Mora, editor. Lima: Ediciones Art Lautrec, Hora Zero, 2001. pp. 9–37.
- "Las historias prohibidas." Los otros Roques. La poética múltiple de Roque Dalton. Rafael Lara-Martínez and Dennis Seager, editors. New Orleans: University Press of the South, 1999. pp. 33–53.
- "Tulio Mora, archivista de América." Identidades en transformación. El discurso indigenista en los países andinos. Silvia Nagy, editor. Catholic University, Quito: Abya Yala. pp. 33–61.
- "Crónica, historiografía e imaginación en las novelas de Manuel Scorza." Beyond Indigenous Voices. Laila/Alila 11th International Symposium on Latin American Indian literatures. Edited by Mary H. Preuss. Pennsylvania State University. California. 1996. pp. 143–150.
- "La arquitectura poética de Eugenio Montejo." Venezuela. Literatura de fin de siglo. Special Issue. INTI Revista de Literatura Hispánica. No. 37-38. Julio Ortega, editor. Brown University. 1993. pp. 133–143.
- "Homenaje a Gabriel García Márquez." Hispania. Guest Column. September 2014, Volumen 97, No. 351–354
- "Prologo. Poemas fraguados en la memoria punzante" En Off. Asrid Fugellie. Santiago de Chile: Editorial la trastienda. 2010. pp. 7–11.
- "Luis Leal: un inmigrante ejemplar." En rendido homenaje a Luis Leal (1907–2010). Víctor Fuentes, Francisco Lomelí and Sara Poot-Herrera (ads). Sponsored by Institute of Chicano Studies and University of California. Santa Barbara: College Editions / Bandanna Books, 2010. 164–169.
- "Por un Logro Milagroso". Suplemento Cultural Tres Mil. San Salvador. 29 de marzo de 2008.
- "Prólogo." Cantos del silencio by Mayamérica Cortez. Charlotte, NC: Union Publishing, 2008.
- "Medellín, capital Mundial de la poesía. Así viví el XV Festival Internacional de poesía en Medellín." Gaceta Iberoamericana. Actualidad Cultural y Literaria. Volumen XVI, Número 1. Otoño, 2005. Washington, DC. Maryland. Virginia.
- "El banquete de la poesía." La Gaceta Literaria. No. 5 Septiembre, 2005. La Habana, Cuba.
- "Cementerio General de Tulio Mora." Ciudad Letrada. Revista mensual de literatura y arte. Huancayo, Perú, 1 de mayo de 2001 No. 007. p. 1-14. Geocities.com
- "Nostalgias y soledades en Mayamérica Cortez." Horizonte 21. Revista Iberoamericana de Poesía. V1. No.4, pp. 16–19. 1996.
- "Poemas de desterrados." Horizonte 21. Revista de la Academia Iberoamericana de Poesía. V1. No.4, pp. 20–22. 1996.

Articles in professional publications

- "Poemas migrantes." Diálogo. An interdisciplinary Studies Journal. Published by The center for Latino Research. DePaul University. Volume 18, Number 2. Fall 2015. 176–181
- "El inmigrante como sujeto polidimensional en Viaje a la tierra del abuelo de Bencastro." MACLAS.Latin American Essays. Volume 24. 75–88
- "Permanente devenir e incesante metamorfosis: Dos discursos sobre la Amazonia colombiana." Actas del XVI Congreso de la Asociación Internacional de Hispanistas. Nuevos caminos del hispanismo. Pierre Civil y Françoise Crémoux, (eds.). Madrid / Frankfurt: Iberoamericana / Vervuert 2010, 158 p. + CD-ROM. 1–20
- "El cronista de la guerra civil y la diáspora salvadoreña. Entrevista con Mario Bencastro." Antípodas XXI. Journal of Hispanic and Galician Studies. Beyond the Volcano. Perspectives on the Literature of El Salvador. Australia, Madrid: Editorial Voz, 2010. 70–99
- "Representación literaria de una revolución fallida en escenario amazónico." (22 pages). University of Pittsburgh, Pittsburgh: Latin American Studies Association Conference Proceedings, 2009. Lasa.international.pitt.edu
- "Nostalgias y soledades en Mayamérica Cortez." Horizonte 21. Revista Iberoamericana de Poesía. V1. No.4, pp. 16–19. 1996.
- "Poemas de desterrados." Horizonte 21. Revista de la Academia Iberoamericana de Poesía. V1. No.4, pp. 20–22. 1996.
- "Poemas migrantes." Diálogo. An interdisciplinary Studies Journal. Published by The center for Latino Research. DePaul University. Volume 18, Number 2. Fall 2015. 176–181
- "El inmigrante como sujeto polidimensional en Viaje a la tierra del abuelo de Bencastro." MACLAS. Latin American Essays. Volume 24. 75–88
- "Permanente devenir e incesante metamorfosis: Dos discursos sobre la Amazonia colombiana." Actas del XVI Congreso de la Asociación Internacional de Hispanistas. Nuevos caminos del hispanismo. Pierre Civil y Françoise Crémoux, (eds.). Madrid / Frankfurt: Iberoamericana / Vervuert 2010, 158 p. + CD-ROM. 1–20
- "El cronista de la guerra civil y la diáspora salvadoreña. Entrevista con Mario Bencastro." Antípodas XXI. Journal of Hispanic and Galician Studies. Beyond the Volcano. Perspectives on the Literature of El Salvador. Australia, Madrid: Editorial Voz, 2010. 70–99
- "Mujer y desequilibrio social desde una novela colombiana." Estudios de Literatura Colombiana. Universidad de Antioquia. No. 24. Enero-Junio, 2009. 65–81.
- "El Antiorientalismo en Pablo Neruda" in Sophia. Austral. Neruda 100 años. Universidad de Magallanes. No. 10. Chile, 2006. 61–80. y en Revista de Lingüística y Literatura. No. 39. Departamento de Lingüística y Literatura. Universidad de Antioquia. Medellín, Colombia.
- "Nicolás Guillén y su legado" MACLAS. Latin American Essays. Middle Atlantic Council of Latin American Studies. Volumen XVII. Virginia Commonwealth University. 2004. 50–63.
- "La casa de las dos palmas de Manuel Vallejo: Documento de una época, una región y su cultura" Conference Proceedings. CD ROM. Latin American Studies Association. (LASA) XXV International Congress. Las Vegas: LASA 2004. 1–16.
- "Rescatando a las poetas hondureñas: Pavón, Salazar Menéndez, Sabonge Gutiérrez y Ramos" Middle Atlantic Conference of Latin American Studies Conference (MACLAS). 2002. 129–141. y en Istmo literatura. Estudios sobre la Literatura Centroamericana. Jorge Román Lagunas, editor. Colección Centro Internacional de Literatura Centroamericana. Volumen 4. Guatemala: Improfset, 2001. 117–131.
- "Narrativa de los Andes antioqueños: Manuel Mejía Vallejo." La Casa Grande. Revista Cultural Iberoamericana. Año 4, No. 14, 2000, México. 48–58.
- "Poetas centroamericanos de fin de siglo: Ana Istarú y Otoniel Guevara. Cuerpo y autoridad." ISTMICA. Revista de la Facultad de Filosofía y Letras. Universidad Nacional. Costa Rica. No. 5-6, 2000. 26–41.
- "Escribir en español en los Estados Unidos." Cuadernos de ALDEEU. Rafael Corbalán Gerardo Piña and Nicolás Toscano, editors. (Review of Spanish Professionals in America). Volume XIII, No 2. The Graduate School and University Center of CUNY. 59–69.
- "Reconstruyendo a Centroamérica a través de la poesía." Inti Revista de literatura Hispánica. No. 46-47. Oscar Hahn and Ana María Barrenechea, editors. Fall 1997-Spring 1998. 45–56.
- "El humor en la poesía de Luis Carlos López." MACLAS. Latin American Essays. Volume XI. Newark, DE: Published in Cooperation with University of Delaware, 1997. 101–111.
- "La metáfora." La palabra y el hombre. Revista de la Universidad Veracruzana. No. 96. México, 1996.
- "Del poema narrativo a la novela poética." Tradición y actualidad de la literatura iberoamericana. P. Bacarisse, editor. Actas del XXX Congreso del Instituto Internacional de Literatura Iberoamericana. Tomo I. University of Pittsburgh. 101–115.
- "Crónica, historiografía e imaginación en las novelas de Manuel Scorza." Cuadernos Hispanoamericanos. No. 543. September 1995. Madrid, Spain.
- "Aurelio Arturo: Ígnea, voraz, palabra encadenada." Revista Atlántica. Poesía. No 9. Cádiz: Engrasa, Año 1995.
- "Razón del extraviado: Mutis entre dos mundos." Cuadernos Hispanoamericanos. No. 523. Madrid. Spain.
- "El más anónimo de los poetas colombianos y el más importante de su generación." Revista Nacional de Cultura. No. 204-205. Caracas: CONAC, La Casa de Bello. Julio/Diciembre 1994. 74–81.
- "Los amores de Maqroll en el anverso social." Álvaro Mutis. Ediciones de Cultura Hispánica. Semana del Autor. Madrid: Instituto de Cooperación Iberoamericana, 1993. 67–78.
- "Propuesta y respuesta de Maqroll." Folios. No.24. Caracas: Monte Ávila Editores Latinoamericana. 35–39.
- "La arquitectura poética de Eugenio Montejo." Prometeo. Revista latinoamericana de poesía. Número 27, 1992, año 10. 99–112.
- "El poema una fértil miseria." Tilalc. Revista Literaria de la Universidad Simón Bolívar. Año 2, No.3, 1986. 60.
- "La Crisis del lenguaje o la pobreza del pensamiento." Revista de la Universidad Simón Rodríguez. Año IV. No. 7, 1985. 126–133.
- "Simón Rodríguez visto en la perspectiva del tiempo." Revista de la Universidad Simón Rodríguez. Año III. No. 4, 1982. 21–33.

Articles in daily journals

- "El Amor en los tiempos del cólera es una novela popular." Diario la Prensa. New York, October 1987. 4. B 6–7.
- "Siembra vientos y recogerás tempestades." Diario la Prensa. New York. November 15, 1987
- "Álvaro Mutis, el poeta de la fértil miseria." El Nacional. Caracas, Venezuela. February 5, 1983.
- "América Latina centró la mirada del mundo." El Nacional. August 3, 1983.
- "El anhelo constante, un libro para todos." El Nacional. March 8, 1982.
- "Simón Rodríguez y la crítica." El Nacional. August 7, 1982.
- "Venezuela puede catalizar el cambio que Colombia espera." El Nacional. August 22, 1982.
- "En Venezuela también estamos expectantes." El Nacional. September 4. C. 11, 1982.
- "La idea de Latinoamérica en escritores europeos." El Nacional. September 7. C.16, 1982.
- "Un trayecto a recorrer por la literatura latinoamericana." El Nacional. September 15. C.3, 1982.
- "El arte combinatoria en los poemas de Octavio Paz." El Nacional. September 25. C.2, 1982.
- "Signos en rotación, una teoría poética." El Nacional. October 2, 1982. C.2, 1982.

Reviews

- "Reseña. Luis Leal. Conversaciones con Víctor Fuentes." Ventana Abierta. Volumen 1, No. 22. Primavera 2007. Centro de Estudios Chicanos. University of California, 2007.
- "El sabor que dejó la película colombiana Rosario Tijeras." Suplemento Cultural Tres Mil. #886. February 3, 2007.
- "Simulación de las máscaras." Pospost. May 22, 2007
- "Morir en Isla Vista (Floreal Hernández/Víctor Fuentes)" Ventana Abierta: Nuestras Voces Peregrinas. Volumen V, Número 18. Primavera 2005. University of California at Santa Barbara.
- "Oscar Castro García. Ah mar amargo." Revista de Estudios Colombianos. No. 22. Asociación de Colombianistas and University of Illinois. No. 22. pp. 53–56. Also published in Estudios de Literatura Colombiana. Universidad de Antioquia, Facultad de Comunicaciones. No 10, Enero-Junio, 2002. pp. 115–119.
- "Entrevista con el poeta José Ramón Ripoll." Malandragem. Review. New York University. 1988
- "Los Emisarios, nuevo poemario de Álvaro Mutis." Suplemento literario de El Nacional. July 28, 1985. 6.
- "El último rostro de Bolívar." Reporte Universitario No 3. Universidad Simón Rodríguez. Also published in El Nacional. March 2, 1984.
- "Trópico absoluto o poesía de lo telúrico." El Nacional. November 25, 1982. 3.

Translation

- Traducción al español de "Fernando Bolero. Entrevista por Rose Berger." Sojourns. Washington DC, February 2008. También publicada en Ventana Abierta. No. 24 Centro de Estudios Chicanos, University of California at Santa Barbara. Primavera, 2008. Diario Co-Latino. San Salvador, El Salvador. December 2007. Redyacción. Colombia, 2008.
