= Mission Ribas =

Venezuelan Bolivarian education mission

Misión Ribas (launched November 2003) is a Venezuelan Bolivarian Mission that provides remedial high school level classes to the five million Venezuelan high school dropouts; named after independence hero José Félix Ribas.

In July 2006 President Chávez announced that the Mission Ribas should become a socio-political movement conformed by students, family members and professors to guarantee its role as a promoting agent of the Bolivarian revolution. There have been many concerns about the effectiveness of this and other missions lately. Even Chávez has expressed worry about the high number of people who drop out of school or do not continue to the Mision Sucre, or Higher Education. The pro-government deputy Pastora Medina admitted that "there are denunciations about the way scholarships are given. There is little commitment from the pupils and the teachers of the Misión Ribas and this has led to a wrong development. In the Caricuao area, in Caracas, there are 300 pupils registered, but only eight go to classes".

== Funding ==
The state-owned Petróleos de Venezuela (PDVSA) is a large contributor to Mission Ribas. In 2009, US$2.1 billion were allocated to the mission, which according to PDVSA were "resources that have resulted in the issuance of 159,749 scholarships" and helped 632,623 Venezuelans earn "the title of Bachelor of the Bolivarian Republic of Venezuela".

In a 2007 New York Times article, it was reported that "most of the students also receive stipends of $85 a month to attend" and that "the students themselves choose who gets the stipends, based on need and dedication".

== Ideology teaching ==
Mission Ribas officials stated that "Political and ideological training ... is the top qualification for a facilitator". Ribas officials gave students lengthy talks about supporting the Venezuelan government, especially during the 2007 Venezuelan referendum when one official from Las Torres told students "to attend marches and street demonstrations supporting Chávez".

== Socialist Production Brigades ==
In May 2009, Citizen Minister and President of PDVSA, Rafael Ramírez, created Socialist Production Brigades from former graduates which aimed to "constitute the aim of promoting community participation and inclusion of volunteerism through the implementation of socialist-oriented projects the execution of works and services to meet the needs in different sectors".
