= José Tomás Boves =

Spanish general (1782–1814)

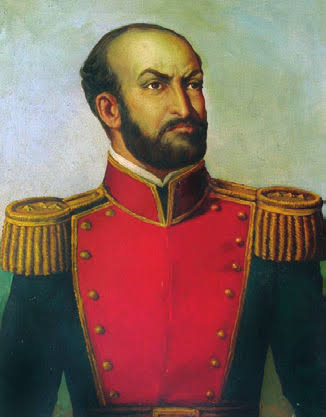
- Portrait created from descriptions by Daniel Florencio O'Leary
- Born: September 18, 1782. Oviedo, Asturias, Spain
- Died: December 5, 1814 (aged 32); Urica, New Andalusia Province, Captaincy General of Venezuela, Spanish Empire
- Occupation: Caudillo
- Known for: His use of brutality and atrocities against those who supported Venezuelan independence

José Tomás Boves (Oviedo, Asturias, Spain, September 18, 1782 – Urica, New Andalusia Province, Captaincy General of Venezuela, Spanish Empire, December 5, 1814), was a royalist caudillo of the Llanos during the Venezuelan War of Independence, particularly remembered for his brutality and atrocities against those who supported Venezuelan independence. Though nominally pro-Spanish, Boves showed little deference to any superior authority and independently carried out his own military campaign and political agenda, even challenging Royalist norms by arguing for land ownership to pass into the hands of the pardos, mestizos, and Indigenous rather than the landowning elite.

== Early life ==
Having lost his father at age 4, he was raised by his single mother, who worked as a seamstress and maid. At the age of 16 Boves was licensed to be a pilot in the merchant marine, later joining the Pla y Portal company, which traded between Spain and the Americas. He was convicted of smuggling in Venezuela and sentenced to prison, but because of the intercession of fellow Asturian residents in Venezuela, who also worked for Pla y Portal, his sentence was commuted to internal exile in Calabozo. There he became a merchant, and once his sentence was finished, he dealt in livestock, a business which allowed him to become very familiar with the vast Venezuelan grasslands and its people.

== Military campaigns ==
As with most residents of Venezuela at the time, Boves was supportive of the juntas established in Venezuela in 1810, which were created after news arrived that the reigning Supreme Central Junta in Spain had dissolved itself due to French advances in southern Spain. His activities against the Republic began only after Domingo de Monteverde's incursions into central Venezuela. He joined Monteverde's forces when they took over Calabozo in May 1812 and was named commander of Calabozo in January 1813. Alongside Monteverde, Boves would be one of the first to mobilize castas, Indigenous, and enslaved into functioning militias fighting against the revolutionary forces. He participated in the unsuccessful attempts to stop Santiago Mariño's invasion of eastern Venezuela, and after the royalist government collapsed, he was granted temporary permission to act at his own discretion by his superior, Field Marshal Juan Manuel Cajigal.

From this point on, he never recognized any superior authority. Making use of his knowledge of the llanos, he amassed a large army of llaneros, known as the Legions of Hell, most of whom were Indigenous, pardo (mixed-race), and formerly enslaved, that dominated the south of the country for the next two years until his death. He lived among his soldiers, and exposed himself to the same risks in battle as them, thereby gaining their extreme loyalty. Although nominally royalist, Boves turned the old colonial order on its head. He ignored Cajigal, who by 1814 was captain general, even when they were campaigning together, and appointed political and military commanders of his own choosing. Further still from his mind was the Spanish Constitution of 1812, which should have been in effect in Venezuela during this time. Most striking to his contemporaries, however, was that he allowed his llanero soldiers to engage in a class and race war against the landed and urban classes of Venezuela, fulfilling the latter's fear, since 1810, that the revolution could devolve into another Haitian Revolution. (Compare Hidalgo's assault on Guanajuato.) Boves's army became feared for its liberal use of pillage and summary executions, which became notorious even in this period when such actions were common on both sides of the conflict. (See Simón Bolívar's "Decree of War to the Death".)

Throughout the second half of 1813, Boves and his army assailed the Second Republic in a series of battles, but without any clear gains until the Battle of La Puerta on June 15, 1814. He captured Valencia and Caracas the following month. He died at the age of 32 on December 5, 1814, at the Battle of Urica, which his troops nevertheless won. Command of his troops passed on to Francisco Tomás Morales. His actions laid the groundwork for Pablo Morillo's expeditionary force to easily occupy Venezuela and to spend its massive resources in neighboring New Granada. Royalists would continue to control Venezuela until 1821.

== Boves in fiction ==
One of the more well-known biographical portraits of Boves's life is the historical novel Boves el Urogallo ("Boves, the Capercaillie") (1972) by Venezuelan novelist Francisco Herrera Luque. In it Herrera Luque describes Boves as:

That fabulous Asturian warrior, who between 1813 and 1814 was champion of the anti-republic, feverish destroyer of the colonial order and the first caudillo of democracy in Venezuela.

The novel was adapted into the film Taita Boves in 2010 by Venezuelan director Luis Alberto Lamata.

== See also ==
- Royalist (Spanish American Revolution)
- Admirable Campaign
- Military career of Simón Bolívar

== Sources ==
- Carrera Damas, Germán (1964). "Estudio preliminar: Sobre el significado socioeconómico de la acción histórica de Boves", Materiales para el estudio de la cuestión agraria en Venezuela (1800–1830), Vol. 1. Caracas: Universidad Central de Venezuela, Consejo de Desarrollo Científico y Humanístico.
- Pérez Tenreiro, Tomás (1997). "Boves, José Tomás," Diccionario de Historia de Venezuela. Caracas: Fundacíon Polar. ISBN 980-6397-37-1
- Stoan, Stephen K. (1974). Pablo Morillo and Venezuela, 1815-1820. Columbus: Ohio State University Press. ISBN 0-8142-0219-5
