= History of Venezuela (1999–present) =

Period in the history of Venezuela

Bolivarian Venezuela
- 1999–present
Republic of Venezuela (until 2 February 1999)
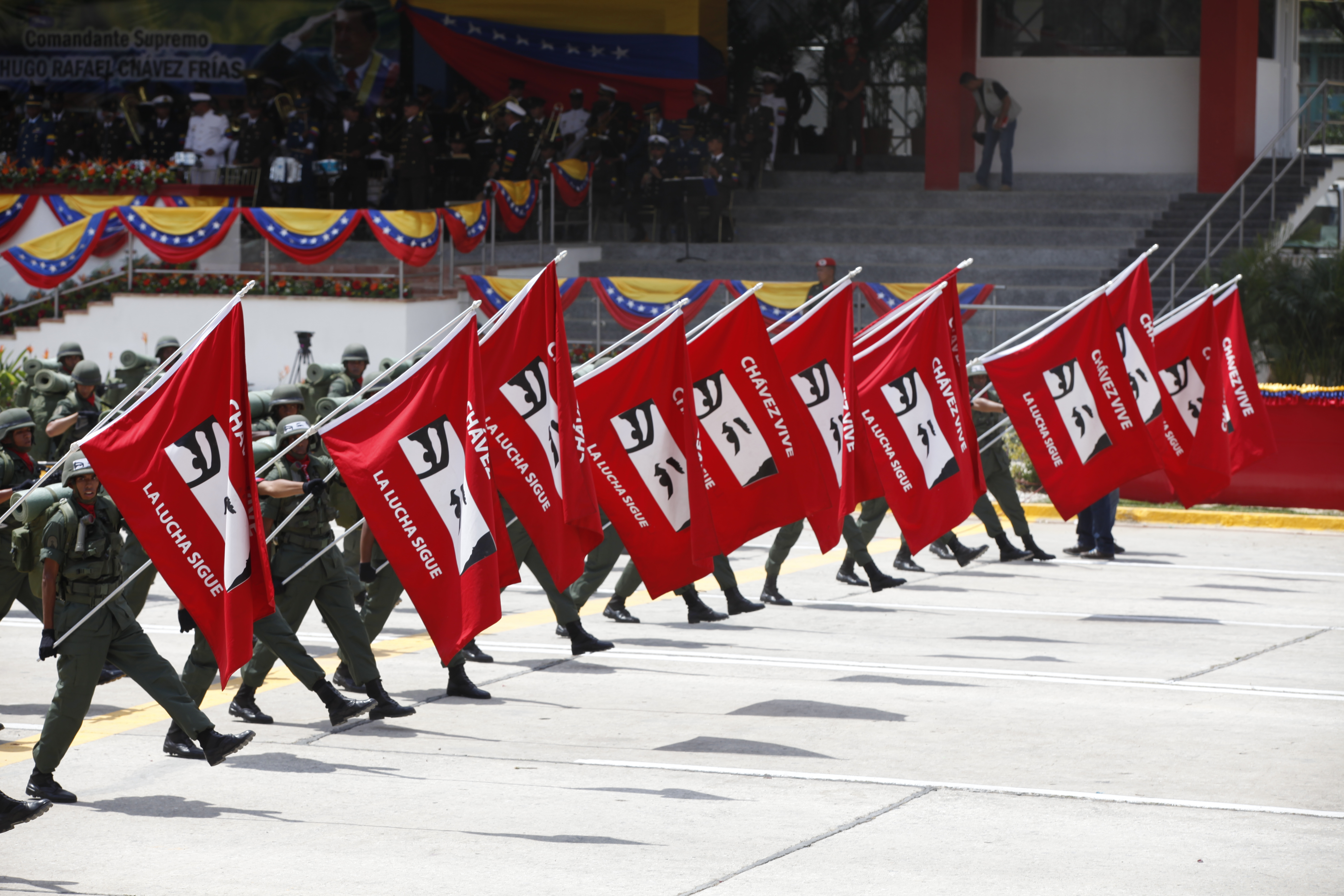
- Venezuelan soldiers carrying red flags with Chavéz's eyes imprinted as the text reads Chavez vive. La lucha sigue ("Chavéz lives. The struggle continues"
- Including: Crisis in Venezuela (2010–present); Venezuelan presidential crisis (2019–2023); Operation Southern Spear (2025–present)
- President of Venezuela: Hugo Chávez (1999–2013); Nicolás Maduro (2013–2026); Delcy Rodríguez (2026–present)

Chavista Venezuela, officially the Bolivarian Republic of Venezuela (Note: Spanish: República Bolivariana de Venezuela) or the Fifth Republic of Venezuela, (Note: Spanish: Quinta República de Venezuela) (Note: Also referred to as the 5th Republic of Venezuela, Socialist Republic of Venezuela, Bolivarian Venezuela, Bolivarianist Venezuela, and Socialist Venezuela.) is the current Venezuelan state that has existed since 1999.

From the 1970s to 1992, Hugo Chávez was a member of the Venezuelan Military and was growing more influential as his military career went on. Chavez launched a failed coup attempt in 1992 and, years later, on 21 October 1997, formed the political party called the Fifth Republic Movement. Chavéz and his party would run in the 1998 elections, where he was elected president on 6 December 1998 and inaugurated on 2 February 1999.

Following his inauguration, the country would see sweeping and radical shifts in social policy, moving away from the last government's embracing of a free-market economy towards income redistribution and social welfare programs, alongside the mass nationalization of private businesses. Additionally, Chávez dramatically shifted Venezuela's traditional foreign policy alignment. Instead of continuing Venezuela's past alignment with the United States and Europe, Chávez promoted alternative development and policies targeting integration with the Global South.

Also following Chavéz's Inauguration, is that there would be three referendums in 1999, first in April 25, second in July 25, and finally, a constitutional referendum in December 15. A new constitution would be adopted on December 20, 1999, officially establishing the current Venezuelan state. On 29 January 2000 Isaías Rodríguez would be sworn in as the Vice President of Venezuela making him the latest Vice President since José Vicente Gómez Bello in May 1928. Between 11 and 14 April 2002, there was a coup attempt that removed Chavéz from office, which led to Pedro Carmona becoming acting president on April 12. Carmona's acting presidency did not last long, as a day later, on April 13, Carmona would be removed from office and be replaced by a Chávez loyalist called Diosdado Cabello. On 14 April 2002, Cabello would reinstate Chavéz as the president of Venezuela. On 15 August 2004 there was a recall referendum on whether Chavéz should be removed from office or not, with the select majority of the voters voting against removing Chavéz from office.

In 2008, the first reports emerged of minor shortages in the country. Later, on 15 February 2009, a referendum was held on whether to abolish term limits, with voters voting yes. The shortages were worsening to the point that the Venezuelan crisis began on 2 June 2010. In late 2012 or very early 2013, shortages were starting to become pretty noticeable, with the scarcity of toilet paper in stores.

On 5 March 2013, Chávez died in office and was succeeded by his Vice President Nicolás Maduro on the same day, Maduro would gain a slim majority in the 14 April 2013 special election which Triggered some protests in 2013. He would be officially sworn in on 19 April 2013 and has ruled by decree for the majority of the period between 19 November 2013 through 2018. During the Maduro administration, the Venezuelan crisis and shortages intensified following the Dakazo panic buying in late 2013 and the Government's continued price control policies by the Chávez previous Chavez administration, resulting in the culmination of major anti–government protests on 12 February 2014. The worsening crisis in 2015 also exacerbated the Venezuelan refugee crisis as well as resulting in the victory of the Mesa de la Unidad Democrática in the 2015 Venezuelan parliamentary election. Later in 2016, hyperinflation in the country would become very prevalent possibly due to causes like money–printing and large deficit spending. In 2017, at the height of the Venezuelan Crisis, Maduro declared a self-coup where he and his cronies consolidated power and weakened the opposition's role in the Government which triggered large scale protests and resulted in a nationwide one day movement involving a few millions of Venezuelans and after that, the First Trump administration imposed sanctions on Venezuela and after that on late July 2017, a Constituent Assembly election was held with 8 million (according to the government) or less than 4 million (according to independent sources) voting in the referendum with GPPSB Members (Mainly Delcy Rodriguez) claiming an absolute major victory.

Elections were held in 2018 with Maduro claiming Victory in the Election, claiming over 60% of Vote against Progressive Social Democratic candidate Henri Falcon and the Centrist Christian Democratic candidate with some if not many Describing the elections as rigged. On 10 January 2019, Maduro would be inaugurated again following his 2018 victory, triggering the Venezuelan presidential crisis. Later on 23 January during the 61st Anniversary of the deposition of Marcos Pérez Jiménez, Juan Guaidó would be sworn in as interim president and massive protests were held in support of Guaidó's Interim government against Maduro. Some countries were divided on who was the Venezuelan president with Western countries such as the United States, Canada, and others recognising Guaidó while Eastern countries such as Russia, Iran, Cuba, and others recognising Maduro. In the late 2010s, Venezuela also started dollarizing its economy in order to solve its economic crisis, hyperinflation crisis, and shortages in the country. In 2019, the shortages in Venezuela have largely ended. In March 2020, the first Trump Administration would issue a 15-million-dollar bounty on Maduro. On early 2022, hyperinflation in the country would largely end. On 5 January 2023, Juan Guaidó resigned as disputed president after announcing in late 2022 that he would resign as disputed president and during his announcement, he also urged Maduro to hold free, fair, and fresh elections.

On 23 October 2023, Venezuela has started seeing escalating tensions with its eastern neighbour Guyana over the region of Guayana Esequiba and became very notable on 3 December 2023 when President Maduro held a referendum on whether to annex Essequibo region or not. The escalating tensions ended in mid-2024 and additionally earlier in late 2023 after winning the 2024 PUD/MUD Primaries by a massive landslide, María Corina Machado announced that she would be running against Maduro in the 2024 Venezuelan presidential election but in Spring 2024 her candidacy was rejected and she was banned from running for president for 15 years for alleged ownership of machine guns and because of that, Edmundo González replaced her as a runner against the Incumbent Party and the results, Maduro claimed victory in the election which was widely considered as rigged because the CNE refused to show the State and Municipal results at all while ConVzla showed the entire state results and most of the municipal results and also because the Opposition installed poll watchers in 82% of Voting stations inside the Country to reveal the actual results of the 2024 election which resulted in widespread anti–government protests. Some countries were also divided on their response to the 2024 elections with Western countries rejecting the results while Eastern countries congratulated Maduro. On 10 January 2025, the anti–government protests largely ended with Maduro's third inauguration which also sparked the second Venezuelan presidential crisis and also made the outgoing Biden administration official Antony Blinken increase Maduro's bounty from 15 million dollars to 25 million dollars and resulted in western countries imposing new sanctions on new Venezuelan Indevidous.

On 7 August 2025, tensions between the United States and Venezuela escalated when the Second Trump administration's Attorney General Pam Bondi Announced she was doubling Maduro's bounty from 25 million dollars a few months earlier, to 50 million dollars in charges such as alleged smuggling of Cocaine and Fentanyl as well having alleged strong ties to the Sinaloa Cartel, the Tren de Aragua gang, and the Cartel of the Suns, and other charges related to alleged drug trafficking. In August 2025, the United States deployed its navy in mass including its aircraft carrier, the USS Gerald Ford into the Caribbean. On September 1, 2025, the United States launched Operation Southern Spear by targeting boats that allegedly had drugs inside them. Tensions continued to escalate between the U.S. and Venezuela with the United States installing the CIA in Venezuela in mid-October 2025, when tensions escalated, Maduro released numerous statements saying that he and Venezuela did not want war at all and that his country is not a threat to the United States and the West. Tensions continued to escalate in November to December 2025 with the U.S. imposing a naval blockade and a no-fly zone over Venezuela and even seizing an oil boat in December 2025. On 10 October 2025, Machado won the Nobel Peace Prize and officially had a ceremony for it on 10 December 2025.

On 3 January 2026 after months escalating tensions as well as planning and preparing, the United States launched a series of airstrikes on government facilities, air defense systems, ports, military muildings, etc.; minutes after airstrikes happened, Maduro declared a State of emergency in response and a few hours after the Maduro and his wife Cilia Flores were captured in a snatch and grab operation by U.S. forces and were sent to trial in NYC following that Some if not many GPPSB officials condemned the strikes with Defense Minister Vladimir Padrino López describing strikes as illegal under international law. Following the strikes, The Venezuelan Collectivos became much more active in the streets of Caracas arresting anyone who supported or had a bit Sympathy towards Maduro's Capture while the government also released also released more than a hundred of political prisoners. On 5 January 2026, after not officially being president for 2 Day, long time Vice President Delcy Rodríguez was officially sworn in as acting President of Venezuela with it being Oath Administered by Her brother and contested National Assembly President Jorge. The strikes on Venezuela triggered mixed reactions across the world with some people including many in the Venezuelan diaspora celebrating in countries like the United States, Spain, Panama, Colombia, Ecuador, Peru, Bolivia, Chile, Argentina, and other places, while opposition to the strikes and Captures were organised and paid by many Communist Movements and Parties and by The People's Forum affiliate of the Party for Socialism and Liberation in America. After Maduro's capture, opposition leader and Nobel Peace Prize winner María Corina Machado called on opposition president Edmundo González to assume the duties of the President of Venezuela and on mid-late January 2026 Machado Visited the United States to meet President Donald Trump to present her Nobel Prize. And addition to reactions to the strikes, politicians also reacted to the strikes with some conservative wave politicians like Javier Milei of Argentina, Daniel Noboa of Ecuador, Nayib Bukele of El Salvador, Santiago Peña of Paraguay, Jose Jeri of Peru, José Raúl Mulino of Panama, and others supporting it while Pink tide politicians like Gustavo Petro of Colombia, Miguel Díaz-Canel of Cuba, Xiomara Castro of Honduras, Luiz Inácio Lula da Silva of Brazil, Claudia Sheinbaum of Mexico, Gabriel Boric of Chile, and others condemning the strikes while Some politicians were neutral on the strikes and capture of Maduro and Flores including Keir Starmer of the United Kingdom, Christian Stocker of Austria, Irfaan Ali of Guyana, Rodrigo Paz of Bolivia, Lee Jae Myung of the Republic of Korea, and some others.

== Background: 1970–1992 ==
Hugo Chávez's political activity began in the 1980s and 1990s, a period of economic downturn and political upheaval in Venezuela. Venezuela's economic well-being fluctuated with the unstable demand for its primary export commodity, oil. Oil accounts for three-quarters of Venezuela's exports, half of its government's fiscal income, and a quarter of the nation's GDP.

The 1970s were boom years for oil, during which the material standard of living for all classes in Venezuela improved. This was partly due to the ruling AD and COPEI parties' investing in social welfare projects which, because of the government's oil income, they could do without heavily taxing private wealth. Venezuelan workers enjoyed the highest wages in Latin America and subsidies in food, health, education and transport. However, "toward the end of the 1970s, these tendencies began to reverse themselves." Per capita oil income and per capita income both declined, leading to a foreign debt crisis and forced devaluation of the bolivar in 1983. The negative trend continued through the 1990s. "Per capita income in 1997 was 8 percent less than in 1970; workers' income during this period was reduced by approximately half."

Along with these economic changes came various changes in Venezuelan society. Class division intensified, as summarised by Edgardo Lander:

A sensation of insecurity became generalized throughout the population, constituting "an emerging culture of violence. . . very distinct from the culture of tolerance and peace that dominated Venezuelan society in the past." (Briceño León et al., 1997: 213). Along with unemployment, personal safety topped the problems perceived as most serious by the population. Between 1986 and 1996 the number of homicides per 10,000 inhabitants jumped from 13.4 to 56, an increase of 418 percent, with most of the victims being young males (San Juan, 1997: 232–233). Countless streets in the middle- and upper-class neighborhoods were closed and privatized; increasingly, bars and electric fences surrounded houses and buildings in these areas. The threat represented by the "dangerous class" came to occupy a central place in the media – along with demands that drastic measures be taken, including the death penalty or direct execution by the police.

During this period, the prospect of a reasonably comfortable life for most Venezuelans, which had appeared attainable in the 1970s, became increasingly remote; poverty and exclusion appeared inescapable for many. According to Lander:

These crises-like conditions increasingly became permanent features of society. We are dealing here not with the exclusion of a minority categorized as "marginal" in relation to society as a whole but with the living conditions and cultural reproduction of the great majority of the population. The result was the development of what Ivez Pedrazzini and Magalay Sánchez (1992) have called the "culture of urgency". They describe a practical culture of action in which the informal economy, illegality, illegitimacy, violence and mistrust of official society are common. Alejandro Moreno (1995) characterizes this other cultural universe as the popular-life world that is other, different from Western modernity – organized in terms of a matriarchal family structure, with different conceptions of time, work, and community, and a relational (community-oriented) rationality distinct from the abstract rationality of the dominant society. This cultural context is scarcely compatible with the model of citizenship associated with liberal democracies of the West.

Shortly after attaining office, Pérez, faced with a severe crisis of international reserves, fiscal as well as trade and balance-of-payment deficits, and an external debt ($34 billion) that under these conditions could not be paid, signed a letter of intent with the International Monetary Fund stipulating that he carry out a liberalization adjustment program. The agreement was not submitted to parliamentary consultation and was made public only after having been signed. On 25 February 1989, the government announced an increase in gasoline prices, and two days later a public transit price rise precipitated the Caracazo, a series of mass demonstrations and riots in Caracas and Venezuela's other principal cities. Pérez suspended civil rights and imposed martial law. The military's suppression of the rebellion resulted in, by the government's own admission, 300 deaths, and others estimate the toll at more than 1000.

=== 1992 and beyond ===
Chávez, who had been involved since the early 1980s in a leftist group in the military called the Movimiento Bolivariano Revolucionario 200 (MBR 200), first came to national prominence as the leader of a coup attempt on Pérez in February 1992. Although the attempt failed, before being imprisoned Chávez was allowed to speak on national television, during which he apologised for the loss of lives and called on his forces to cease fighting, but also defended his goals of reform and stated famously that he was putting down his weapons "por ahora" – for now – implying that he might one day return. That brief television appearance gave Chávez national recognition.

Pérez survived another coup attempt in November 1992, but was impeached by Congress in 1993 for using $17 million to finance the campaign of Violeta Chamorro in Nicaragua and his own inauguration party. Rafael Caldera succeeded him by winning the elections in December 1993 with 30% of the vote to his nearest rival's 23%. As per one of his election promises, he pardoned Chávez and other army dissidents in March 1994. Like Pérez, he adopted IMF programs in 1996 and 1997 that stipulated liberalization adjustment and opened the state oil industry to private investment. In November 1996, about 1.3 million workers walked off the job in a general public sector strike; and in late August 1998, Caldera obtained legislation from Congress enabling him to rule by decree.

During this period, the late 1990s, the principal leftist parties were La Causa Radical (LCR), which won 48 congressional seats in 1993, and the Movimiento al Socialismo (MAS). Hugo Chávez and the MBR 200 also remained active. At the MBR 200 national assembly in December 1996, its members voted to participate in the upcoming 1998 presidential and 1998 parliamentary elections, and created a new organisation, the Fifth Republic Movement (Movimiento Quinta República, MVR) intended to unite groups opposed to the main parties. Chávez's bid for the presidency was supported by a coalition called the Polo Patriótico (Patriotic Pole, PP) which, besides Chávez's MVR, included the PPT, and significant portions of the MAS, LCR, Movimiento Primero de Mayo, and Bandera Roja.

The major promises in the election platform enunciated by Chávez during his 1998 campaign included the following:

- Reorientation of the oil industry:
  - Cease privatisation of the state oil company, Petróleos de Venezuela.
  - Review concessions that the state had granted to foreign oil companies
  - Redistribute income from the oil industry to benefit the lower economic classes more
- Pursue an economic course independent of global capitalist, especially United States, dictates; he characterised this as a "third way", an alternative to "neo-liberalismo salvaje", "savage neo-liberalism"
- Rewrite the 1961 constitution. He proposed to hold a referendum seeking approval to dissolve Congress and convene an elected "constitutional assembly" whose task would be to write a new constitution
- Attack corruption, which he said eats up 15% of public revenues
- Crack down on the epidemic of tax evasion by major contributors
- Raise the minimum wage, provide a 30,000 Bolivar ($53) stipend to the unemployed, improve job security and retirement guarantees, increase spending on job creation and education.

== 1999: Economic crisis and new constitution ==
With many Venezuelans tired of politics in the country, the 1998 elections had the lowest voter turnout in Venezuelan history, with Chávez winning the presidency on 6 December 1998 with 56.4% of the popular vote. His nearest opponent was Henrique Salas Römer with about 40%. He took the presidential oath of office on 2 February 1999, the principal points of his mandate were to reform the constitution, break up what his supporters perceived as an entrenched oligarchy, reverse Venezuela's economic decline, strengthen the role of the state in the economy, and redistribute wealth to the poor. Chávez's first few months in office were dedicated primarily to constitutional reform, while his secondary focus was on immediately allocating more government funds to new social programs.

However, as a recession triggered by historically low oil prices and soaring international interest rates rocked Venezuela, the shrunken federal treasury provided very little of the resources Chávez required for his promised massive populist programs. The economy, which was still staggering, shrunk by 10% and the unemployment rate increased to 20%, the highest level since the 1980s. Chávez worked to reduce Venezuelan oil extraction in the hopes of garnering elevated oil prices and, at least theoretically, elevated total oil revenues, thereby boosting Venezuela's severely deflated foreign exchange reserves. He extensively lobbied other OPEC countries to cut their production rates as well. As a result of these actions, Chávez became known as a "price hawk" in his dealings with the oil industry and OPEC. Chávez also attempted a comprehensive renegotiation of 60-year-old royalty payment agreements with oil giants Philips Petroleum and ExxonMobil. These agreements had allowed the corporations to pay in taxes as little as 1% of the tens of billions of dollars in revenues they were earning from their extraction of Venezuelan oil. Afterwards, Chávez stated his intention to complete the nationalization of Venezuela's oil resources. Although unsuccessful in his attempts to renegotiate with the oil corporations, Chávez focused on his stated goal of improving both the fairness and efficiency of Venezuela's formerly lax tax collection and auditing system, especially for major corporations and landholders. Chávez wished to promote the redistribution of wealth, increased regulation, and social spending, he did not wish to discourage foreign direct investment (FDI). In keeping with his predecessors, Chávez attempted to shore up FDI influxes to prevent an economic crisis of chronic capital flight and inflation. Despite such actions and a tripling in oil prices, capital flight more than doubled from $4 billion in 1999 to $9 billion in 2002 due to the uncertainties of Chávez's controversial actions.

In April 1999, Chávez ordered all branches of the military to devise programs to combat poverty and to further civic and social development in Venezuela's vast slum and rural areas. This civilian-military program was launched as "Plan Bolivar 2000", and was heavily patterned after a similar program enacted by Cuban President Fidel Castro during the early 1990s, while the Cuban people were still suffering through the "Special Period". Projects within Plan Bolivar 2000s scope included road building, housing construction, and mass vaccination. Though the plan initially had $20.8 million set aside for costs, some state that the program cost Venezuela approximately $113 million, nearly five times more than planned. The plan faltered at the end of 2001 with accusations and revelations of corruption by military officers, including both military officers who later rebelled against the president in April 2002 and officers linked to the president.

=== New constitution ===
In April 1999, a national referendum was held, the question being whether to create an elected assembly to draw up a new Constitution of Venezuela. The result of the referendum was 71.8% in favour. Consequently, in July 1999, elections were held to choose delegates to the assembly. In these elections, Chávez's slate of candidates received 52% of the vote but won 95% of the seats, 125 of the 131 seats, due to the voting procedures decided by the government beforehand. Fifty-four per cent of the eligible electorate did not vote.

The job of the assembly, which was called the Assemblea Nacional Constituyente (ANC), was to come up with a new constitution in six months or less. The draft would then be submitted to the Venezuelan people for acceptance or rejection via a referendum. The Assembly set up 21 commissions to work on specific topics.

Conflict soon arose between the Constitutional Assembly and the older institutions it was supposed to reform or replace. During his 1998 presidential campaign, and in advance of the 25 July elections to the Assembly, Chávez had maintained that the new body would immediately have precedence over the existing National Assembly and the courts, including the power to dissolve them if it so chose. Against this, some of his opponents, including notably the chief justice of the supreme court, Cecilia Sosa Gomez, argued that the Constitutional Assembly must remain subordinate to the existing institutions until the constitution it produced had been ratified.

In mid August 1999, the Constitutional Assembly moved to restructure the nations judiciary, giving itself the power to fire judges, seeking to expedite the investigations of corruption outstanding against what the New York Times estimated were nearly half of the nation's 4700 judges, clerks, and bailiffs. On 23 August, the supreme court voted 8-6 that the Assembly was not acting unconstitutionally in assuming those powers; however, the next day Cecilia Sosa Gomez resigned in protest. Over 190 judges were eventually suspended on charges of corruption. Eventually the Supreme Court was also dissolved and new judges were appointed that were supporters of Chávez.

On 25 August, the Constitutional Assembly declared a "legislative emergency", voting to limit the National Assembly's work to matters such as supervising the budget and communications. In response, the National Assembly, which in July had decided to go into recess until October to avoid conflict with the Constitutional Assembly, declared its recess over, effective 27 August. At one point the Constitutional Assembly prohibited the National Assembly from holding meetings of any sort. However, on 10 September, the two bodies reached an agreement allowing for their "coexistence" until the new constitution took effect.

On 20 November 1999 the Constitutional Assembly presented the proposed constitution that was to be accepted or rejected by the nation's voters. With 350 articles, it was one of the world's lengthiest. A general tendency of this Constitution is that it attempts to establish a participatory as well as a representative democracy. On specific points, it changes the country's official name from "Republic of Venezuela" to "Bolivarian Republic of Venezuela". It also increased the presidential term of office from five to six years, allowed for two consecutive presidential terms rather than one, and introduced provisions for national presidential recall referendums—that is, Venezuelan voters gained the right to remove the president from office before the expiration of his presidential term. Such referendums are activated by a petition to do so with the required number of signatures. The presidency was given more power, including the power to dissolve the National Assembly. The new constitution converted the formerly bicameral National Assembly into a unicameral legislature, and stripped it of many of its former powers. Provisions were made for a new position, the Public Defender, an office with the authority to check the activities of the presidency, the National Assembly, and the constitution. Chávez characterized the Public Defender as the guardian of the "moral branch" of the new Venezuelan government, tasked with defending public and moral interests.

On 15 December 1999, after weeks of heavy rain, statewide mudslides claimed the lives of an estimated 30,000 people. Critics claim Chávez was distracted by the referendum and that the government ignored a civil defense report, calling for emergency measures, issued the day the floods struck. However, Chávez's government rejected these claims. Chávez then personally led the relief effort afterwards. Subsequent mudslides in 2000 left 3 dead.

== 2000–2001: Re-election, rule by decree, land reform ==
Elections for the new unicameral National Assembly were held on 30 July 2000. During this same election, Chávez himself stood for reelection. Going into the elections, Chávez had control of all three branches of government. Chávez's coalition also garnered a commanding two-thirds majority of seats in the National Assembly while Chávez was reelected with 60% of the votes. The Carter Center monitored the 2000 presidential election; their report on that election stated that, due to lack of transparency, CNE partiality, and political pressure from the Chávez government that resulted in early elections, it was unable to validate the official CNE results. However, they concluded that the presidential election legitimately expressed the will of the people.

Later, on 3 December 2000, local elections and a referendum were held. The referendum, backed by Chávez, also proposed a law that would force Venezuela's labor unions to hold state-monitored elections. The referendum was widely condemned by international labor organisations—including the International Labour Organization—as undue government interference in internal union matters; these organisations threatened to apply sanctions on Venezuela.

=== Enabling act and rule by decree ===
After the May and July 2000 elections, Chávez backed the passage of an enabling act by the National Assembly. This act allowed Chávez to rule by decree for one year. In November 2001, shortly before the Enabling Act was set to expire, Chávez used it to put into place a set of 49 laws central to the implementation of his programs. These included a Hydrocarbons Law, through which it sought to gain greater state control over the oil industry. The law increased the transnational companies taxation in oil extraction activities to 30% and set the minimum state participation in "mixed companies" at 51%, whereby the state-run oil company, Petróleos de Venezuela S.A. (PDVSA), could have joint control with private companies over industry.

With large oil incomes in Chávez's first years of presidency, he had successfully initiated a land transfer program and had introduced several reforms aimed at improving the social welfare of the population. These reforms entailed the lowering of infant mortality rates; the implementation of a free, government-funded healthcare system; and free education up to the university level. By December 2001, inflation fell to 12.3% the lowest since 1986, while economic growth was steady at four percent. Chávez's administration also reported an increase in primary school enrollment by one million students. Shortly after he became president Chavez abolished registration fees in public schools; a move that he claimed allowed 400,000 more students to enroll in school.

The 49 laws, representing as they did the first major concrete step toward economic redistribution, were received with significant opposition. Chávez's clashes with multiple social groups he supposedly alienated and his close ties with controversial presidents Mohammad Khatami, Sadaam Hussein and Muammar Gaddafi also hurt his approval rating. Nelson then says what hurt Chávez's popularity the most was his relationship with Fidel Castro and Cuba, with Chávez attempting to make Venezuela in Cuba's image. Venezuela became Cuba's largest trade partner while Chávez, following Castro's example, consolidated the country's bicameral legislature into a single National Assembly and created community groups of loyal supporters allegedly trained as paramilitaries. Such actions created great fear among Venezuelans who felt like they were tricked and that Chávez had dictatorial goals.

=== 2001 strikes and growing opposition to Chávez ===
Chávez's opposition originated from the response to the "cubanization" of Venezuela when mothers realized that the new textbooks in Venezuela were really Cuban books filled with revolutionary propaganda and with different covers causing them to protest. By the summer months of 2001, the opposition groups grew quickly from concerned mothers to labor unions, business interests, church groups, and right and leftwing political parties.

The Venezuelan Federation of Chambers (cámaras) of Commerce, – Fedecámaras – and the Confederación de Trabajadores de Venezuela (CTV) – a labour union federation – then called for a general business strike (paro cívico) for 10 December 2001 to protest the 49 laws. According to López Maya, at this time the president of the Fedecamaras, Pedro Carmona Estanga, emerged as the leader of the opposition movement. The paro attracted thousands of people.

With the strike, the positions of both government and opposition became more intractable. The opposition warned that if the 49 laws were not amended, they would take to the streets again to attempt to force the issue, and later demanded the outright revocation of the laws. The government, for its part, refused to consider amending the laws.

== 2002: Coup and strike/lockout ==
The atmosphere of heightened confrontation initiated by the December 2001 paro cívico continued into the year 2002. The opposition formed a "Coordinating group for Democracy and Freedom," later known as the Democratic Coordinator (Coordinadora Democrática, CD) to organise joint action against the government. On 23 January, the opposition staged a massive march, which was met by a counter march by government sympathisers. On 4 February, a pro-government march was countered by opposition marches in several cities.

According to economist Francisco Rodríguez, "real GDP contracted by 4.4 percent and the currency had lost more than 40 percent of its value in the first quarter of 2002 ... As early as January of that year, the Central Bank had already lost more than $7 billion in a futile attempt to defend the currency ... [an] economic crisis had started well before the political crisis—a fact that would be forgotten in the aftermath of the political tumult that followed." A few months after the coup, in December 2002, the Chávez presidency faced a two-month strike organized by management at the national oil company, Petróleos de Venezuela S.A. (PDVSA) when he took steps to dismiss 17,000 workers; the strike deepened the economic crisis and cut the government off from all-important oil revenue. The CTV, supported by Fedecámaras and other opposition groups, called for a one-day strike for 9 April 2002; later it extended the strike for 24 hours, and then announced that it would be indefinite, and called for a march to the PDVSA headquarters in Caracas on 11 April in protest. On late morning of the 11th, by which time hundreds of thousands of people were standing outside the PDVSA offices, CTV leader Carlos Ortega suddenly called for a continuation of the march to the presidential palace at Milaflores, saying "With a great sense of responsibility I address our nation to request in the name of democratic Venezuela. I do not rule out the possibility that the crowd, this human river marches united to Milaflores to expel a traitor to the Venezuelan people." At this time, however, Milaflores was already surrounded by Chávez supporters who had been conducting a vigil there since 9 April; and, when news of the opposition's movements spread, thousands more rushed there to augment the pro-Chávez side. By early afternoon the two sides were about 200 metres apart. Around 2:30, shooting began with gunfire killing both Chávez supporters and opposition while causing great confusion of who committed the violent actions.

After the shooting had begun, a group of dissident military officers, headed by Vice Admiral Ramirez Pérez, appeared on television and stated that "The President of the Republic has betrayed the trust of the people, he is massacring innocent people with snipers. Just now six people were killed and dozens wounded in Caracas." and that because of this they no longer recognised Chávez as president of Venezuela. Chávez took over the Venezuelan airwaves several times in the early afternoon in what is termed a cadena, or a commandeering of the media airwaves to broadcast public announcements, asking protesters to return to their homes, playing lengthy pre-recorded discourses, and attempting to block coverage of the ensuing violence.

Lucas Rincón Romero, Commander-in-Chief of the Armed Forces of Venezuela, announced in a nationwide broadcast that Chávez had tendered his resignation from the presidency. While Chávez was held in a military base, military leaders appointed the president of the Fedecámaras, Pedro Carmona, as Venezuela's interim president. Carmona issued a decree dissolving parliament and the supreme court, abolishing the ombudsman, and firing governors and mayors. He also reverted the country's name to República de Venezuela and reversed Chávez's main social and economic policies.

Carmona's decrees were followed by pro-Chávez uprisings and looting across Caracas. Responding to these disturbances, Venezuelan soldiers loyal to Chávez called for massive popular support for a counter-coup. These soldiers later stormed and retook the presidential palace, and retrieved Chávez from captivity. The shortest-lived government in Venezuelan history was thus toppled, and Chávez resumed his presidency on the night of Saturday, 13 April 2002. Following this episode, Rincón was reappointed by Chávez as Commander of the Army, and later as Interior Minister in 2003.

=== Controversy about the coup ===
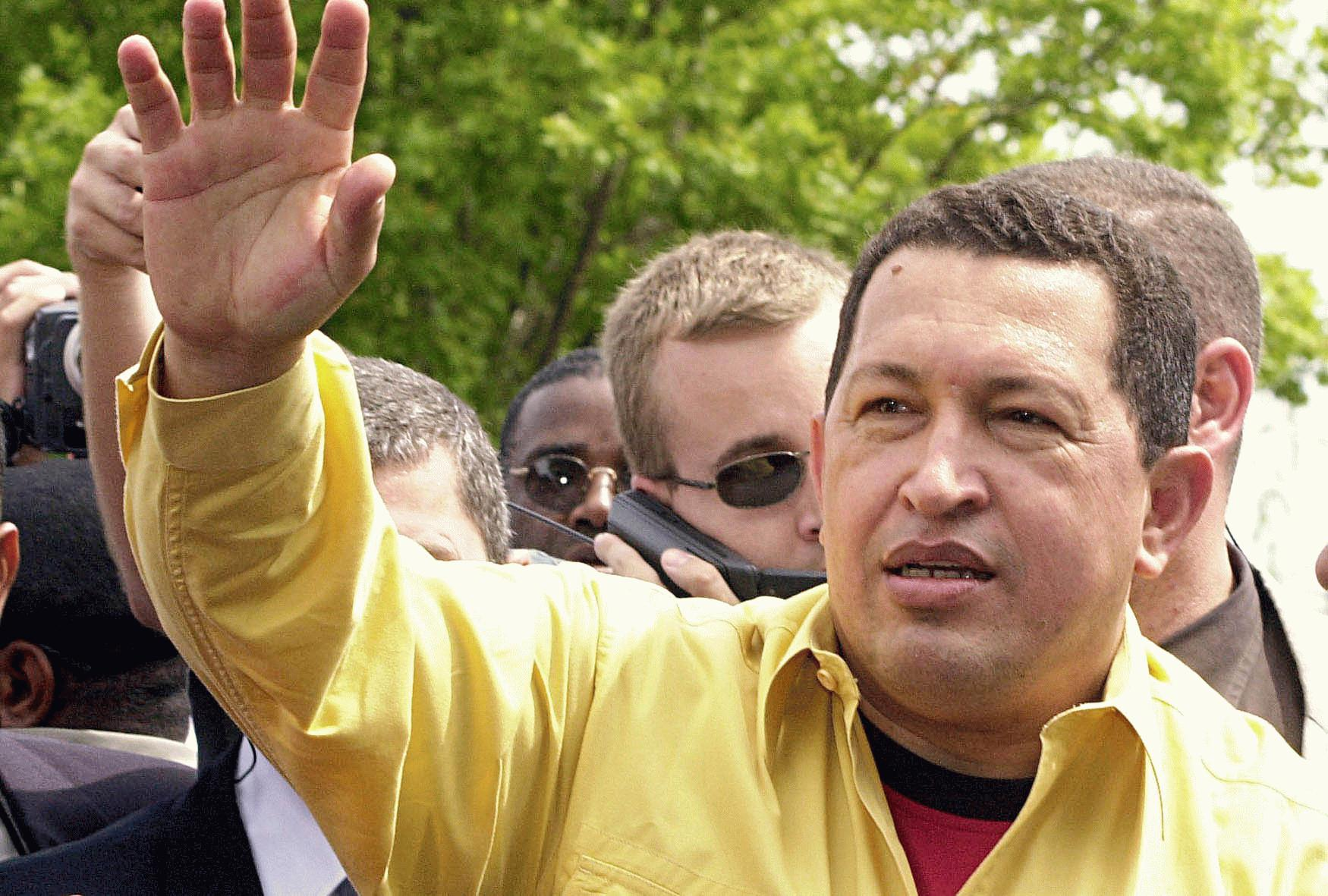
Chávez waves to supporters after disembarking at Salgado Filho Airport on 26 January 2003 while en route to the World Social Forum convened in Porto Alegre, Brazil (Agência Brasil).

After Chávez resumed his presidency in April 2002, he ordered several investigations to be carried out, and their official results supported Chávez's assertions that the 2002 coup was sponsored by the United States. On 16 April 2002, Chávez claimed that a plane with U.S. registration numbers had visited and been berthed at Venezuela's Orchila Island airbase, where Chávez had been held captive. On 14 May 2002, Chávez alleged that he had definitive proof of U.S. military involvement in April's coup. He claimed that during the coup Venezuelan radar images had indicated the presence of U.S. military naval vessels and aircraft in Venezuelan waters and airspace. The Guardian published a claim by Wayne Madsen – a writer (at the time) for left-wing publications, conspiracy theorist and a former Navy analyst and critic of the George W. Bush administration – alleging U.S. Navy involvement. U.S. Senator Christopher Dodd, D-CT, requested an investigation of concerns that Washington appeared to condone the removal of Mr Chavez, which subsequently found that "U.S. officials acted appropriately and did nothing to encourage an April coup against Venezuela's president", nor did they provide any naval logistical support. According to Democracy Now!, CIA documents indicate that the Bush administration knew about a plot weeks before the April 2002 military coup. They cite a document dated 6 April 2002, which says: "dissident military factions... are stepping up efforts to organize a coup against President Chávez, possibly as early as this month." According to William Brownfield, ambassador to Venezuela, the US embassy in Venezuela warned Chávez about a coup plot in April 2002. The United States Department of State and the investigation by the Office of the Inspector General found no evidence that "US assistance programs in Venezuela, including those funded by the National Endowment for Democracy (NED), were inconsistent with US law or policy" or "... directly contributed, or was intended to contribute, to [the coup d'état]."

Chávez also claimed, during the coup's immediate aftermath, that the U.S. was still seeking his overthrow. On 6 October 2002, he stated that he had foiled a new coup plot, and on 20 October 2002, he stated that he had barely escaped an assassination attempt while returning from a trip to Europe. During that period, the US Ambassador to Venezuela warned the Chávez administration of two potential assassination plots.

=== After the coup ===
Following his return to office, Chávez quickly took steps to secure support for his government. First, Chávez replaced key generals and held at least five top military leaders including the head of the army. Chávez attempted conciliation by replacing some of his cabinet ministers with people more acceptable to the opposition, reinstating the PDVSA managers whom he had fired in February and removing their replacements, and inviting various international figures and organisations to the country to help mediate between the government and opposition. Chávez also took another measure to reduce the likelihood of a recurrence of the coup attempt: he sought to strengthen support among rank and file soldiers by boosting support programs, employment, and benefits for veterans. He also promulgated new civilian-military development initiatives.

Despite these measures, conflict simmered throughout the rest of 2002. On 22 October 14 military officers who had been suspended for participating in the coup, led by General Enrique Medina Gómez, occupied the Francia de Altamira Plaza in a wealthy Eastern Caracas neighbourhood and declared it a "liberated territory". In early November, there was a major clash of government and opposition demonstrators in downtown Caracas; and, in the middle of the month, a shootout which resulted in three deaths occurred in Caracas' Bolivar Plaza between the Metropolitan Police and the National Guard.

=== General strike ===
Fedecámaras and the CTV called for a fourth paro cívico to begin on 2 December 2002. This strike, known as the Venezuelan general strike of 2002–2003, turned out to be the most significant of the four strikes. On 4 December, the opposition called for a day of signature gathering for a recall referendum. The key element of the paro was the stoppage of production at Petróleos de Venezuela, which was effected by management's locking workers out of facilities. According to some sources, it also included changing computer passwords so as to disable equipment. Venezuela had to begin importing oil to meet its foreign obligations; domestically, gasoline for cars became virtually unobtainable, with many filling stations closed and long queues at others. Many privately owned businesses closed or went on short time, some out of sympathy for the strike, others because of the fuel shortage and economic paralysis.

Large pro- and anti-Chávez marches were held in the first weeks of the strike, which on 9 December the opposition had declared to be of indefinite duration. Before the strike began to dissolve in February 2003, it produced severe economic dislocation. The country's GDP fell 25% during the first trimester of 2003; open unemployment, which was running about 15% before and after the shutdown, reached 20.3% in March 2003; the volume of crude oil produced was 5% less in 2003 than the previous year; and the volume of refined oil products was 17% less.

The strike began to dissolve in February 2003, when "small- and medium-sized businesses reopened their doors, admitting that the strike now threatened to turn into a 'suicide watch' that could well bankrupt their businesses for good." The government gradually reestablished control over PDVSA and oil production reached pre-strike levels. In the aftermath of the strike, the government fired 18,000 PDVSA employees, 40% of the company's workforce.

== 2003–2004: Recall vote ==
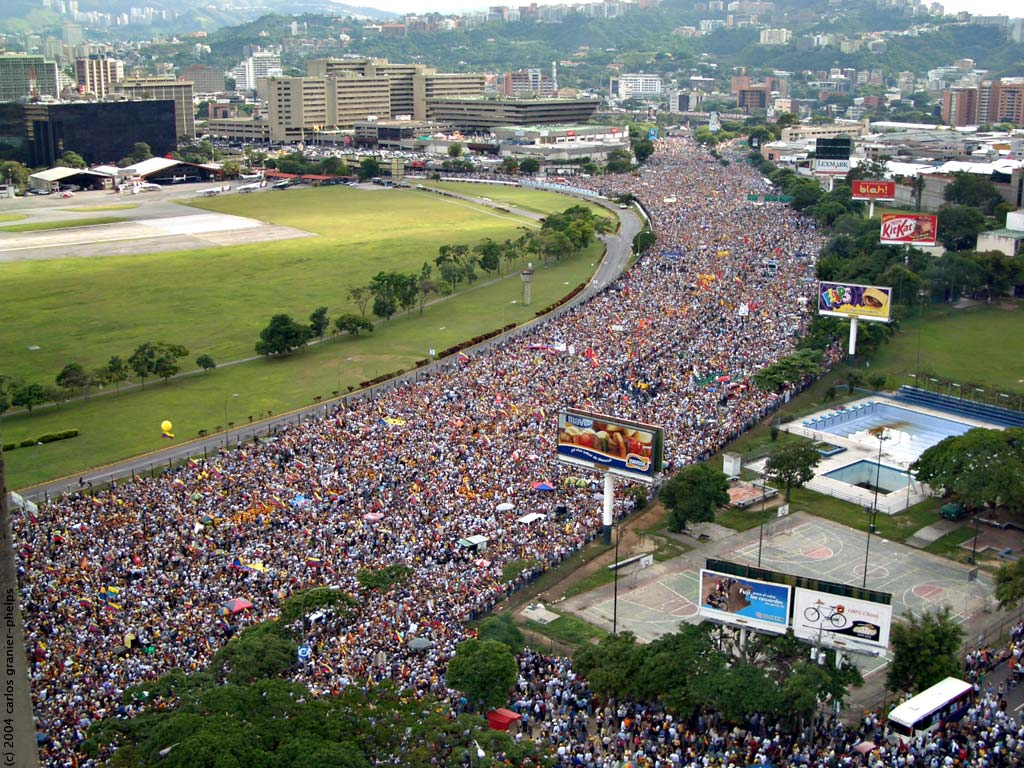
A rally in Caracas

In 2003 and 2004 Chávez launched a number of social and economic campaigns which had become possible as for the first time he had a good economy and the oil industry, which produces 80% of Venezuela's exports by value, 25% of its GDP, and 50% of the government's income, was for the first time not under hostile management. In July 2003 he launched "Mission Robinson", billed as a campaign aimed at providing free reading, writing and arithmetic lessons to the more than 1.5 million Venezuelan adults who were illiterate prior to his 1999 election. On 12 October 2003, Chávez initiated "Mission Guaicaipuro", a program billed as protecting the livelihood, religion, land, culture, and rights of Venezuela's indigenous peoples. In late 2003, the Venezuelan president launched "Mission Sucre" (named after independence-war hero General Antonio Jose de Sucre), which is primarily a scholarship program for higher education. As of about 2005, it was giving out about 100,000 need-based grants each year to bright students who would have been financially barred from university education in the past. In November 2003, Chávez announced "Mission Ribas", with the promise of providing remedial education and diplomas for Venezuela's five million high school dropouts. On the first anniversary of Mission Robinson's establishment, Chávez stated in Caracas's Teresa Carreño theater to an audience of 50,000 formerly illiterate Venezuelans, "in a year, we have graduated 1,250,000 Venezuelans." Nevertheless, there were also significant setbacks. Notably, the inflation rate rocketed to 31% in 2002 and remained at the high level of 27% in 2003, causing a great deal of hardship for the poor.

On 9 May 2004, a group of 126 Colombians were captured during a raid of a farm near Caracas. Chávez soon accused them of being a foreign-funded paramilitary force who intended to violently overthrow his rule. These events merely served to further the extreme and violent polarization of Venezuelan society between pro- and anti-Chávez camps. Chávez's allegations of a putative 2004 coup attempt continue to stir controversy and doubts to this day. In October 2005, 27 of the accused Colombians were found guilty, while the rest were released and deported.

In early and mid-2003, Súmate, a grassroots volunteer civilian voter rights organization, began the process of collecting the millions of signatures needed to activate the presidential recall provision provided for in Chávez's 1999 Constitution. In August 2003, around 3.2 million signatures were presented, but these were rejected by the pro-Chávez majority in the Consejo Nacional Electoral (CNE; "National Electoral Council") on the grounds that many had been collected before the midpoint of Chávez's presidential term. Reports then began to emerge among opposition and international news outlets that Chávez had begun to act punitively against those who had signed the petition, while pro-Chávez individuals stated that they had been coerced by employers into offering their signatures at their workplaces. In November 2003, the opposition collected an entirely new set of signatures, with 3.6 million names produced over a span of four days. Riots erupted nationwide as allegations of fraud were made by Chávez against the signature collectors.

The provision in the Constitution allowing for a presidential recall requires the signatures of 20% of the electorate in order to effect a recall. Further, the cedulas (national identity card numbers) and identities of petition signers are not secret, and in fact were made public by Luis Tascón, a member of the Venezuelan National Assembly representing Chávez' party (Fifth Republic Movement – MVR) and the Communist Party of Venezuela of Táchira state. The government was accused of increasing the voter rolls by giving citizenship to illegal immigrants and refugees; and the opposition claimed that it was a citizenship for votes program. Voter registration increased by about 2 million people ahead of the referendum, which in effect raised the threshold of the 20% of the electorate needed to effect a recall.

Reports again emerged that Chávez and his allies were penalizing signers of the publicly posted petition. Charges were made of summary dismissals from government ministries, PDVSA, the state-owned oil corporation, the Caracas Metro, and public hospitals controlled by Chávez's political allies. Finally, after opposition leaders submitted to the CNE a valid petition with 2,436,830 signatures that requested a presidential recall referendum, a recall referendum was announced on 8 June 2004 by the CNE. Chávez and his political allies responded to this by mobilizing supporters to encourage rejection of the recall with a "no" vote.

The recall vote itself was held on 15 August 2004. A record number of voters turned out to defeat the recall attempt with a 59% "no" vote. The election was overseen by the Carter Center and the Organization of American States, and was certified by them as fair and open. European Union observers did not attend, saying the government had placed too many restrictions on their participation. Critics called the results fraudulent, citing documents which indicated that the true results were the complete opposite of the reported ones, and raising questions about the government ownership of voting machines. "Massive fraud" was alleged and Carter's conclusions were questioned, although five other opposition polls showed a Chávez victory.

While the OAS observers and a reluctant Bush administration, endorsed the results, a few critics, including economists Ricardo Hausmann of Harvard and Roberto Rigobon of MIT, alleged that certain procedures in the election may have allowed the government to cheat. The Carter Center admitted Taylor had "found a mistake in one of the models of his analysis which lowered the predicted number of tied machines, but which still found the actual result to lie within statistical possibility."

A jubilant Chávez pledged to redouble his efforts against both poverty and "imperialism", while promising to foster dialogue with his opponents. Chávez's government subsequently charged the founders of Súmate with treason and conspiracy for receiving foreign funds, earmarked for voter education, from the United States Department of State through the National Endowment for Democracy, triggering commentary from human rights organizations and the U.S. government. The trial has been postponed several times. A program called "Mission Identity", to fast track voter registration of immigrants to Venezuela—including Chávez supporters benefiting from his subsidies—has been put in place prior to the upcoming 2006 presidential elections.

== 2004–2005: Focus on foreign relations ==
In the aftermath of his referendum victory, Chávez's primary objectives of fundamental social and economic transformation and redistribution accelerated dramatically. Chávez himself placed the development and implementation of the "Bolivarian Missions" once again at the forefront of his political agenda. Sharp increases in global oil prices gave Chávez access to billions of dollars in extra foreign exchange reserves. Economic growth picked up markedly, reaching double-digit growth in 2004 and a 9.3% growth rate for 2005.

Many new policy initiatives were advanced by Chávez after 2004. In late March 2005, the Chávez government passed a series of media regulations that criminalised broadcast libel and slander directed against public officials; prison sentences of up to 40 months for serious instances of character defamation launched against Chávez and other officials were enacted. When asked if he would ever actually move to use the 40-month sentence if a media figure insulted him, Chávez remarked that "I don't care if they [the private media] call me names.... As Don Quixote said, 'If the dogs are barking, it is because we are working.'" Chávez also worked to expand his land redistribution and social welfare programs by authorizing and funding a multitude of new "Bolivarian Missions", including "Mission Vuelta al Campo"; the second and third phases of "Mission Barrio Adentro", both first initiated in June 2005 with the stated aim of constructing, funding, and refurbishing secondary (integrated diagnostic center) and tertiary (hospital) public health care facilities nationwide; and "Mission Miranda", which established a national citizen's militia. Meanwhile, Venezuela's doctors went on strike, protesting the siphoning of public funds from their existing institutions to these new Bolivarian ones, run by Cuban doctors.

Chávez focused considerably on Venezuela's foreign relations in 2004 and 2005 via new bilateral and multilateral agreements, including humanitarian aid and construction projects. Chávez has engaged, with varying degrees of success, numerous other foreign leaders, including Argentina's Néstor Kirchner, China's Hu Jintao, Cuba's Fidel Castro, Iran's Mahmoud Ahmadinejad and Russia's Vladimir Putin. On 4 March 2005, Chávez publicly declared that the U.S.-backed Free Trade Area of the Americas (FTAA) was "dead". Chávez stated that the neoliberal model of development had utterly failed in improving the lives of Latin Americans, and that an alternative, anti-capitalist model would be conceived in order to increase trade and relations between Venezuela, Argentina and Brazil. Chávez also stated his desire that a leftist, Latin American analogue of NATO be established.

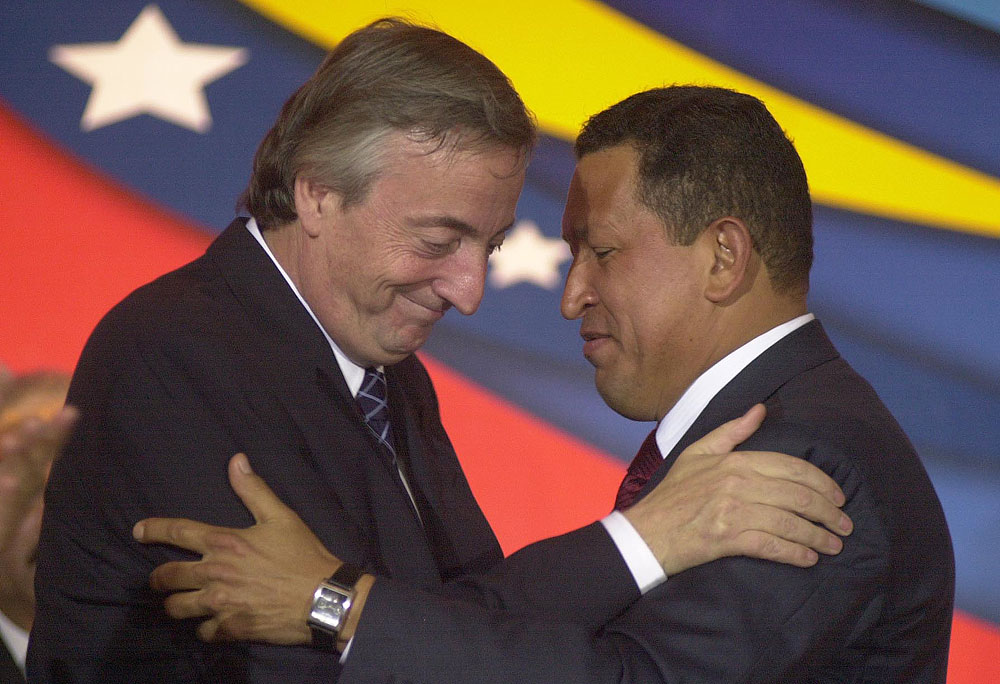
Chávez embraces Argentinian President Néstor Kirchner during the closing of a July 2004 joint press conference held in Venezuela (Office of the Argentine Presidency).

Over the course of 2004 and 2005, the Venezuelan military under Chávez also began in earnest to reduce weaponry sourcing and military ties with the United States. Chávez's Venezuela is thus increasingly purchasing arms from alternative sources, such as Brazil, Russia, China and Spain. Friction over these sales escalated, and in response Chávez ended cooperation between the militaries of the two countries. He also asked all active-duty U.S. soldiers to leave Venezuela. In October 2005, Chávez banished the Christian missionary organization "New Tribes Mission" from the country, accusing it of "imperialist infiltration" and harboring connections with the CIA. At the same time, he granted inalienable titles to over 6,800 square kilometres of land traditionally inhabited by Amazonian indigenous peoples to their respective resident natives, though this land could not be bought or sold as Western-style title deeds can. Chávez cited these changes as evidence that his revolution was also a revolution for the defense of indigenous rights, such as those promoted by Chávez's Mission Guaicaipuro.

During this period, Chávez placed much greater emphasis on alternative economic development and international trade models, much of it in the form of extremely ambitious hemisphere-wide international aid agreements. For example, on 20 August 2005, during the first graduation of international scholarship students from Cuba's Latin American School of Medicine, Chávez announced that he would jointly establish with Cuba a second such medical school that would provide tuition-free medical training—an ex gratia project valued at between $20 and 30 billion—to more than 100,000 physicians who would pledge to work in the poorest communities of the Global South. He announced that the project would run for the next decade, and that the new school would include at least 30,000 new places for poor students from both Latin America and the Caribbean.

Chávez has also taken ample opportunity on the international stage to juxtapose such projects with the manifest results and workings of neoliberal globalization. Most notably, during his speech at the 2005 UN World Summit, he denounced development models that are organised around neoliberal guidelines such as liberalisation of capital flows, removal of trade barriers, and privatisation as the reason for the developing world's impoverishment. Chávez also went on to warn of an imminent global energy famine brought about by hydrocarbon depletion (based on Hubbert peak theory), stating that "we are facing an unprecedented energy crisis.... Oil is starting to become exhausted."

In 2005, Chávez demanded the extradition of Luis Posada Carriles, accused of conspiring to bomb Cubana Flight 455. A Texas judge blocked the extradition on the grounds that he could be tortured in Venezuela; the Venezuelan embassy blamed the Department of Homeland Security for refusing to contest such accusations during the trial. Chávez also requested the extradition of former Venezuelan officers and members of Militares democraticos, Lt. German Rodolfo Varela and Lt. Jose Antonio Colina, who are wanted for bombing the Spanish and Colombian embassies after Chávez made a speech criticizing both governments.

== 2006–2008 ==
In December 2005, the BBC said that Chavez "has made no secret of the fact that he is in favour of amending the constitution so that he can run again for president in 2012." He has stated that he intends to retire from the Venezuelan presidency in 2021. The following year Chavez sought re-election and his approval ratings in August stood at 55%.

In 2006 Chávez announced Venezuela's bid to win a non-permanent seat on the UN Security Council; Washington officials encouraged Latin American and Caribbean nations to vote instead for Guatemala. Analysts quoted by Forbes magazine said that Chávez would offer to supply 20% of China's crude oil needs if Beijing backed Venezuela's bid to join the UN Security Council. In Chile, the press was concerned that Venezuelan grants for flood aid might affect the government's decision about which country to support for admission to the UN Security Council. However, Venezuela was never able to obtain more votes than Guatemala in the forty-one separate UN votes in October 2006. Because of this deadlock in voting, Panama was selected as a consensus candidate and subsequently won the election for Latin America's seat on the Security Council.

In accordance with his foreign policy trends, Chávez has visited several countries in Latin America, as well as Portugal, Belarus, Russia, Qatar, Syria, Iran, Vietnam, Mali and Benin. At the request of Gambian President Yahya Jammeh, Chávez also attended the 2006 summit of the African Union in Banjul. He also visited the People's Republic of China and Malaysia.

In 2006 Chavez accused the United States government of attempting to turn Colombia into Venezuela's adversary over the recent arms dispute. "The U.S. empire doesn't lose a chance to attack us and try to create discord between us. That's one of the empire's strategies: Try to keep us divided." Chavez said in response to the United States government.

Chávez again won the OAS and Carter Center certification of the national election on 3 December 2006 with 63% of the vote, beating his closest challenger Manuel Rosales who conceded his loss on 4 December 2006. After his victory, Chávez promised a more radical turn towards socialism.

According to Datos Information Resources, family income among the poorest stratum grew more than 150% between 2003 and 2006.

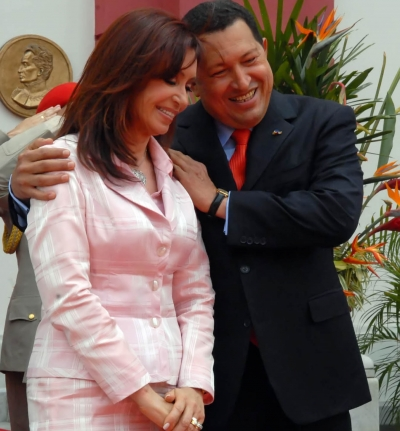
The President of Argentina Cristina Fernández de Kirchner, with Hugo Chávez 5 March 2008.

On 8 January 2007 President Chávez installed a new cabinet, replacing most of the ministers. Jorge Rodríguez was designated the new vice president, replacing José Vicente Rangel. Chávez announced that he will send to the National Assembly a new enabling act, asking for the authority to re-nationalize the biggest phone company of the country (Cantv), and other companies from the electrical sector, all previously public companies which were privatized by past administrations. He also asked to eliminate the autonomy of the Central Bank.

On 31 January 2007 the Venezuelan National Assembly approved an enabling act granting Chávez the power to rule by decree in certain areas for 18 months. He plans to continue his Bolivarian Revolution, enacting economic and social changes. He has said he wants to nationalize key sectors of the economy. Chávez, who is beginning a fresh six-year term, says the legislation will be the start of a new era of "maximum revolution" during which he will consolidate Venezuela's transformation into a socialist society. A few critics, however, are calling it a step towards greater authority by a leader with unchecked power.

On 8 February 2007 the Venezuelan government signed an agreement to buy an 82.14% stake in Electricidad de Caracas from AES Corporation. Paul Hanrahan, president and CEO of AES said the deal has been a fair process that respected the rights of investors. In February 2007, the Venezuelan government bought a 28.5% stake of the shares of CANTV from Verizon Communications.

On 30 April 2007 Chávez announced that Venezuela would be formally pulling out of the International Monetary Fund (IMF) and the World Bank, having paid off its debts five years ahead of schedule and so saving US$8 million. The debt was US$3 billion in 1999. Chávez then announced the creation of a regional bank, the Bank of the South, and said that the IMF and the World Bank were in crisis.

The next day he announced intentions to re-take control of oil projects in the Orinoco Belt, which he said are "the world's largest crude reserve". These reserves, which can be exploited with modern technologies, may place Venezuela ahead of Saudi Arabia in terms of oil reserves.

In May 2007, the Chavez government refused to renew the license of the nation's most popular television station, Radio Caracas Televisión (RCTV), alleging the company participated in the 2002 coup d'état. This led to many, prolonged protests in Caracas. Also, tens of thousands have marched through Caracas to support President Chávez's decision.

=== Speech to the United Nations ===
On 20 September 2006, Chávez delivered a speech to the United Nations General Assembly damning U.S. President George Bush. In the speech Chavez referred to Bush as "the devil", adding that Bush, who had given a speech to the assembly a day earlier, had come to the General Assembly to "share his nostrums to try to preserve the current pattern of domination, exploitation and pillage of the peoples of the world." Although it was widely condemned by U.S. politicians and the American media, the speech received "wild applause" in the Assembly, and the speech came at a time President George W. Bush's approval rating was at a low point among Americans.

=== Subsidising heating fuel for the poor in the U.S. ===
In 2005, President Chávez initiated a program to provide cheaper heating fuel for poor people in several areas of the United States (New York Daily News, 21 September 2006). The program was expanded in September 2006 to include four of New York City's five boroughs, earmarking 25 million gallons of fuel for low-income New York residents this year at 40% off the wholesale market price. That quantity provides sufficient fuel to heat 70,000 apartments, covering 200,000 New Yorkers, for the entire winter (New York Daily News, 21 September 2006). It has also been reported that Chavez is sending heating oil to poor, remote villages in Alaska. Some have questioned the motives of this generosity. Legislative leaders in Maine have asked that state's governor to refuse the subsidised oil, and New York Daily News criticized his offer by calling him an "oil pimp".

=== Latin American Summit incident ===
In November 2007 at the Ibero-American Summit in Santiago de Chile, Chávez and Spanish Prime Minister José Luis Rodríguez Zapatero were engaged in a heated exchange. Chávez, irritated by Zapatero's suggestion that Latin America needed to attract more foreign capital, referred to former Spanish Prime Minister José María Aznar as a fascist. Zapatero asked Chávez to use proper decorum. Although his microphone had by that point been turned off as his time was up, Zapatero was within earshot and engaged with Chávez who continued to interrupt the prime minister, attempting to make a point. King Juan Carlos I of Spain then pointed his finger at Chávez, telling him, "¿Por qué no te callas?" (Why don't you shut up?). Chávez later said he did not hear Juan Carlos. President Daniel Ortega of Nicaragua, next to speak, ceded a minute of his time to Chávez to allow him to finish his point. Ortega then proceeded to add emphasis to Chávez's points by suggesting that Spain had used intervention in his country's elections. Ortega also referred to the monopoly of the Spanish energy company Union Fenosa on the impoverished counties' privatized power utility. The king, followed by an aide, stood up and walked out of the event—an unprecedented diplomatic incident, especially because the king had never before shown any sign of irritability.

=== Constitutional referendum ===
On 15 August 2007, Chavez called for an end to presidential term limits. He also proposed limiting central bank autonomy, strengthening state expropriation powers and providing for public control over international reserves as part of an overhaul of Venezuela's constitution. In accordance with the 1999 constitution, Chavez proposed the changes to the constitution, which were then approved by the National Assembly. The final test was a 2 December 2007 referendum.

On 1 November 2007, a massive protest was staged in Caracas, led by many Venezuelan students, calling on the National Electoral Council in Caracas to postpone the referendum on the proposed constitutional reforms. Chavistas holding a demonstration in support of the reforms clashed with the protesters and the scene turned violent, prompting police action. Since then, the global community has criticized Chavez for excessive police action. The President denounced the opposition protest as resorting to "fascist violence" on 9 November 2007.

On 26 November 2007 the Venezuelan government broadcast and circulated an alleged confidential memo from the US embassy to the CIA. The memo allegedly contains an update on US clandestine operations against the Chavez government. Although Independent analysts find it to be "quite suspect". Two days before the constitutional referendum, Chávez threatened to cut off oil shipments to the US if it criticized the voting results.

The referendum was defeated on 2 December 2007, with 51% of the voters rejecting the amendments proposed by Chávez. Chávez stated that he would step down at the end of his second term in 2013. In November 2008, he proposed another constitutional amendment removing term limits, so that he could remain in office until as late as 2021. This time, the resolution passed with 54% voting in favor after 94% of the votes have been counted.

== From 2009: Term limits eliminated and human rights abuses ==
On 15 February 2009, Chávez won a referendum to eliminate term limits, allowing him to run for re-election indefinitely. Subsequently, polls showed most Venezuelans did not want him to continue indefinitely, and expressed increasing concern over crime, the economy, and infrastructure; and increasing consolidation of power. A staunch former ally who was instrumental in returning Chávez to power in 2002, Raúl Baduel, broke with Chávez after being charged with corruption and accused him of being a tyrant.

A 2010 OAS report indicated "achievements with regard to the eradication of illiteracy, the set up of a primary health network, land distribution and the reduction of poverty", and "improvements in the areas of economic, social, and cultural rights". The report also found "blistering" concerns with freedom of expression, human rights abuses, authoritarianism, and "the existence of a pattern of impunity in cases of violence", as well as erosion of separation of powers and "severe economic, infrastructure, and social headaches".

Chávez rejected the 2010 OAS report, calling it "pure garbage", and said Venezuela should boycott the OAS; a spokesperson said, "We don't recognize the commission as an impartial institution". He disclaimed any power to influence the judiciary. A Venezuelan official said the report distorts and takes statistics out of context, saying that "human rights violations in Venezuela have decreased".

According to the National Public Radio, the report discusses decreasing rights of opposition to the government and "goes into heavy detail" about control of the judiciary. It says elections are free, but the state has increasing control over media and state resources used during election campaigns, and opposition elected officials have "been prevented from actually carrying out their duties afterward".

CNN has said the "lack of independence by Venezuela's judiciary and legislature in their dealings with Chavez often leads to the abuses", and The Wall Street Journal blames the government of Chavez.

On 7 October 2012, Chávez won his country's presidential election for a third time, defeating Henrique Capriles for another six-year term. The American press has often demonized the political process in the country, calling the government a "dictatorship". His victory was short-lived, however, as Chavez died five months later, on 5 March 2013.

=== Crime statistics ===
The Chávez government has often been criticized for letting crime worsen. The murder rate in Venezuela was about 19 murders per 100,000 in 1999. It had risen to 75 murders per 100,000 for 2011 according to non-governmental sources and to 48 murders per 100,000 upon admission by the Minister of Justice. The national government stopped publishing regular data on the murder rate in 2004. However, in 2009, then Minister of Interior Affairs and Justice Tareck el-Aissami started massive reforms in police and security services and started to replace "old" police with new "Bolivarian" police. According to new statistics, in area where "old" police was replaced by "bolivarian" police, criminality including murders dropped by 30–50%. Despite the efforts, the murder rate reached new record highs in 2011 and again in 2012.

=== Arms importation ===
Venezuela became the eighth-most-important weapons importing country in 2011 according to the Russian Centre for the Analysis of the Arms Trade, surpassing Turkey and Pakistan. As of 2012, Venezuela had about US$7.2 billion in debt for the purchase of weapons from Russia.

=== Nicolás Maduro ===
President Maduro was formally inaugurated as President of Venezuela on 19 April 2013, after the election commission had promised a full audit of the election results.

In October 2013, Maduro requested an enabling law to rule by decree in order to fight corruption and to also fight what he called an 'economic war'. On 24 October, he also announced the creation of a new agency, the Vice Ministry for the Supreme Social Happiness of the Venezuelan People, to coordinate all social programs. In November 2013, weeks before the local elections, President Maduro used his special decree powers and ordered the military to take over appliance stores. Analysts said that the move amounted to a "cannibalizing" of the economy and that it might lead to even more shortages in the future. An article by The Guardian noted that a "significant proportion" of the subsidized basic goods in short supply were being smuggled into Colombia and sold for far higher prices. In February 2014, the government said it had confiscated more than 3,500 tons of contraband on the border with Colombia—food and fuel which, it said, was intended for "smuggling" or "speculation". The president of the National Assembly, Diosdado Cabello, said that the confiscated food should be given to the Venezuelan people, and should not be "in the hands of these gangsters."

On 28 March 2017, the Venezuelan Supreme Court removed the immunity for parliamentary assembly members, the majority of whom were anti-Maduro. On 30 March 2017, the Venezuelan Supreme Court took over law making powers from the National Assembly, but this decision was reversed on 1 April 2017.

The process and results of the May 2018 Venezuelan presidential election were widely disputed. The opposition-majority National Assembly declared Maduro's presidency illegitimate on the day of his second inauguration, citing the 1999 Constitution of Venezuela enacted under Hugo Chávez, Maduro's predecessor. The body declared that his reelection was invalid, and declared its president, Juan Guaidó, to be acting president of the country. The pro-Maduro Supreme Tribunal of Justice said the National Assembly's declaration was unconstitutional. A Venezuelan presidential crisis ensued from January 2019 to January 2023.

The U.S. intervention in Venezuela captured President Maduro and his wife Cilia Flores in early January 2026. Interim president Delcy Rodríguez has improved significantly Venezuela’s relations to the United States and the two countries restored diplomatic ties and increased their economic co-operation, especially in the field of Venezuelan oil and gas production.

In June 2026, two strong earthquakes hit Venezuela, causing deaths of at least 2,600 people and widespread damage.

== Sources ==
- Roberto Briceño León et al., "La cultura emergente de la violencia en Caracas," Revista Venezolana de Economía y Ciencias Sociales, 3, nos. 2–3, (1997).
- Margarita López Maya, "Venezuela 2002-2003: Polarization, Confrontation, and Violence," in Olivia Burlingame Goumbri, The Venezuela Reader, Washington D.C.: EPICA Task Force, 2005.
- Alejandro Moreno, El aro y la trama: episteme, modernidad y pueblo. Caracas, 1995.
- Ives Pedrazzini and Magaly Sánchez, Malandros, bandas y ni os de la calle. Valencia, Venezuela, 1992.
- Ana Maria San Juan, "La criminalidad en Caracas," Revista Venezolanoa de Economía y Ciencias Sociales 3, nos. 2-3 (April–September 1997).
- Eric Wingerter, "A People's Platform: Land Reform, Health Care and Literacy," in Olivia Burlingame Goumbri, The Venezuela Reader, Washington D.C.: EPICA Task Force, 2005.
