= Francisco Fajardo =

Spanish conquistador (c.1524–1564)

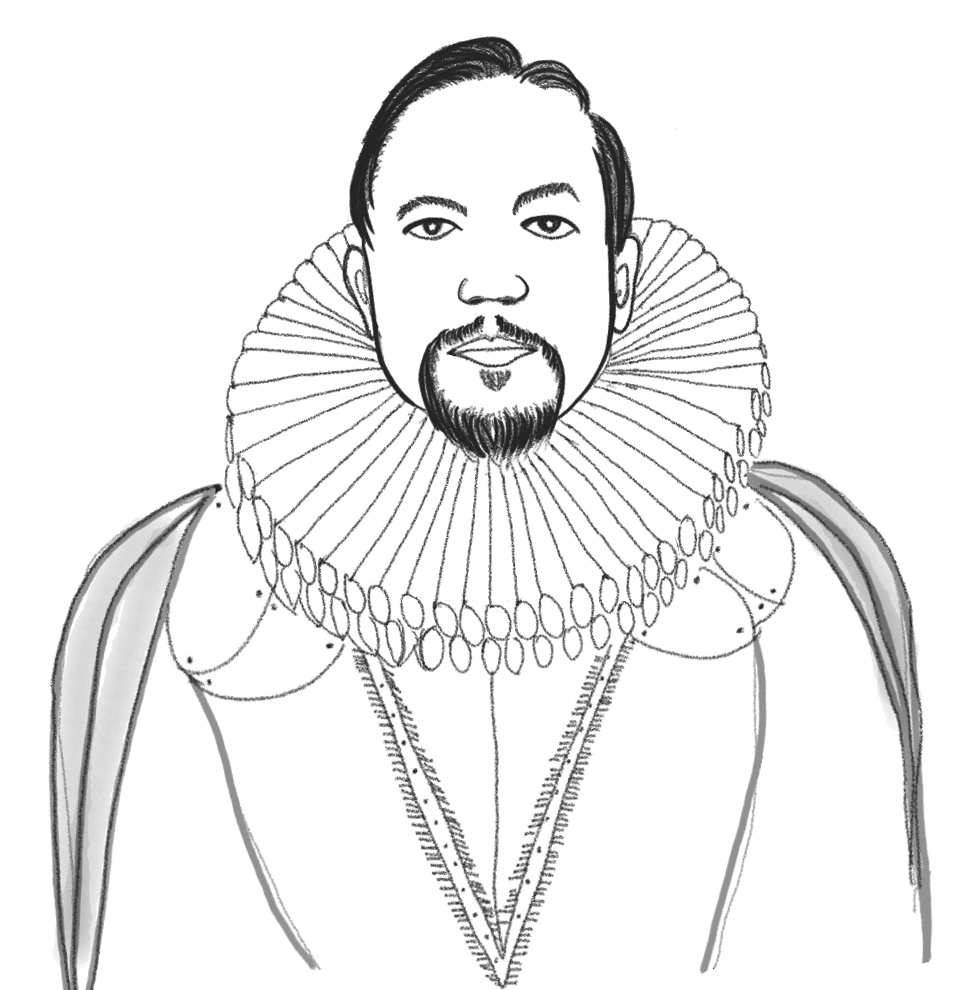
Drawing of Fajardo

Francisco Fajardo (c. 1524 – 1564) was a Spanish conquistador active in Venezuela. He was an example of a mestizo (mixed race) conquistador.

Born om Isla Margarita in New Spain, Fajardo was the son of a Spanish lieutenant of the same name and an indigenous Indian woman, Isabel of the Waikerí. In 1555 to 1557 he made several expeditions from Margarita to conquer the Caracas tribe around the valleys of present-day Caracas, even before the city was formally founded by conqueror Diego de Losada. As a mestizo (person of mixed race) he was able to blend in with the indigenous tribes of the coast physically and culturally. After murdering a local cacique he had to flee back to Margarita in 1558.

He returned to the mainland in 1560, becoming lieutenant-general of Valencia, Venezuela, before going back to Margarita to defend it against Lope de Aguirre. On a new expedition to the mainland he discovered a gold mine in the territory of the Teques, in the Caracas region near present-day Los Teques. Early attempts at settlement had to be abandoned in 1562 when an uprising led by Guaicaipuro forced Fajardo to retreat again to Margarita, an expedition by Luis de Narváez to reinforce Fajardo having been destroyed.

After setting out on a new expedition from Margarita in 1564, he was arrested and executed in Cumaná by Alonso Cobos after a sham trial. Cobos was arrested in Cumana by Fajardo men in retaliation, and after a trial in Margarita was executed for the murder of Fajardo.

The major highway of Caracas, the Francisco Fajardo Highway, was named after him until 2021, when the highway name was changed to Cacique Guaicaipuro in honor of indigenous people and decolonization.

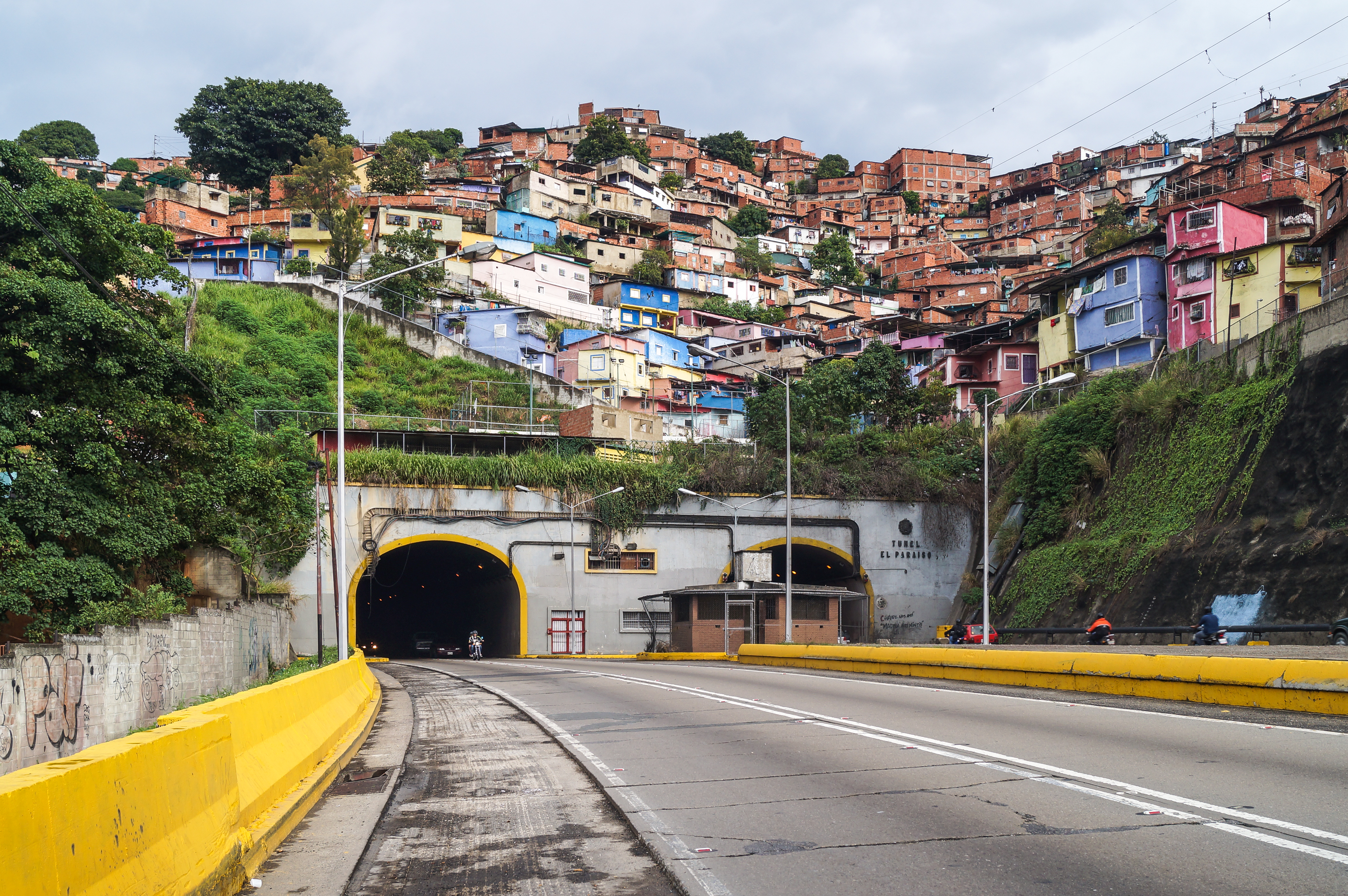
Tunel El Paraiso is located in the Francisco Fajardo Highway in Caracas. It was built between 1967 and 1968.

== Books ==
- Juan Ernesto Montenegro (1974), Francisco Fajardo: origen y perfil del primer fundador de Caracas, Caracas: Concejo Municipal del Distrito Federal
