= Palmeros Asuntinos =

Venezuelan association that harvests palm leaves for Palm Sunday

- Asociación de Palmeros Asuntinos
- Founded: August 30, 1998
- Type: Non-profit cultural association
- Location: La Asunción, Nueva Esparta, Venezuela
- Key people: Eduardo Marcano (President)

The Palmeros Asuntinos are the members of the Asociación de Palmeros Asuntinos (APA), a community group in La Asunción, the capital of Nueva Esparta state, Margarita Island, Venezuela. Every year before Palm Sunday, around fifty of them climb Cerro Copey — the island's highest peak — to prune leaves from the native Royal Palm. The leaves are then distributed to parishes across the state for blessing during Holy Week.

The practice is part of a wider Venezuelan tradition called Palma Bendita (Blessed Palm), also carried out by groups in Chacao (Miranda) and the Valle del Espíritu Santo (Nueva Esparta). Eduardo Marcano, the APA's president, has stated that the community has practised this tradition for over 266 years. In December 2019, UNESCO added the Biocultural Programme for the Safeguarding of the Palma Bendita Tradition in Venezuela to its Register of Good Safeguarding Practices (file no. 01464).

== History ==
=== Origins ===
The city of La Asunción was established in the second half of the 16th century as the capital of the Province of Margarita. Evidence of organised Holy Week celebrations there goes back to 1604, when a letter by Bishop Martín Vásquez de Arce described religious life on the island during Lent. A later bishop, Pedro Martínez de Oneca, noted during a pastoral visit in 1758 that Easter observances on the island needed to be brought in line with church requirements — suggesting the tradition was already established but informal.

The earlier form of the tradition was recalled by a keeper of the Castillo Santa Rosa in La Asunción, whose account was recorded by Bernabé Marcano in 1997:

At midday, the sound of a guarura — a sea conch — gave the labourers their rest; that same sound, in the early hours of the last Friday of Lent, called the carriers together to climb the mountain.

Marcano also noted the original equipment: a long-sleeved shirt made from flour sacking (to keep off ticks), a sombrero sanjuanero, and rope sandals. Carriers brought down between twelve and fifteen bundles per trip, sized to their own strength.

=== Foundation ===
The APA was formally registered on 30 August 1998. Its charter describes the group as a non-profit open to anyone regardless of race, politics, or economic background, aimed at the "moral, spiritual and Christian elevation of the Asuntino people." Registration meant the association could negotiate annual permits with INPARQUES, the national parks authority, and start a replanting programme on the mountain.

== The annual harvest ==
=== Thursday: the ascent ===
The cycle begins the Thursday before the Viernes de Concilio — the last Friday of Lent — when the palmeros walk up to a base camp called Juan Marta Rivas, roughly 339 metres above sea level on Cerro Copey. That evening they hold a coordination meeting with the INPARQUES representative, who reads out the annual harvesting permit (in 2022, a limit of 200 leaves in the Copey–Sierra–San Juan zone), and bed assignments are settled according to internal association rules.

=== Friday: the harvest ===
At four in the morning the guarura sounds. Members gather at a small chapel — housing images of Our Lady of the Assumption, the Virgin of the Valley, and José Gregorio Hernández — for prayers and traditional songs. Five teams of six to eight people then head to different parts of the mountain.

The route involves crossing two streams (Río Blanco and Río Negro), wading through a muddy hollow called the Charcal and climbing a steep section known as la Escalera. GPS data from the 2023 expedition recorded 8.2 kilometres round-trip, a maximum altitude of 579 metres, and a total time of 8 hours 11 minutes.

Each palm gives up only one or two leaves, cut with a homemade tool — a blade tied to a two-metre pole. The leaves are plaited and bound with a ballestrinque knot, a nautical hitch inherited from the island's fishing tradition.

=== Return and procession ===
By half past ten the teams are back at camp, and the palmeros carry the bundles down to the historic centre of La Asunción. At the Cruz de los Palmeros each member touches or kisses the wooden cross. A procession with the image of Our Lady Mary Help of Christians then moves through the town, with a stop at the Sanabria family house in El Copey, where palm was traditionally stored after the descent. The leaves are then taken to the APA's headquarters for distribution to parishes across Nueva Esparta.

In 2023, around fifty palmeros made the climb and brought down 350 leaves of Royal Palm.

=== Palm Sunday ===
On Palm Sunday morning the faithful gather before the former convent of San Francisco — now the seat of the state legislature — and the bishop blesses the palm amid incense. The procession then continues to the Cathedral of La Asunción with the state band playing.

== Members ==
The APA has four membership categories: active palmeros (who do the pruning), women members (a small number climb to the harvest zones), palmeritos (children in training), and honorary members. Members range from seven to over eighty years old. The first woman to take part in the pruning alongside the men was Carolina Figueroa Narváez in 2001, when she was 18.

Many palmeros also serve as cargadores — carriers of religious images in Holy Week processions — a role that runs in certain families over generations.

== Reforestation ==
By the 1990s the practice was growing fast enough that INPARQUES considered restricting it. The palmeros responded by switching from cutting whole fronds to pruning selected leaves, allowing plants to recover. They also set up a nursery and plant saplings on the mountain each year, and scatter ripe seeds by hand — a technique called boleo — to encourage natural regeneration. The APA also runs workshops in La Asunción schools.

== UNESCO recognition ==
On 12 December 2019, at the 14th session of the Intergovernmental Committee for the Safeguarding of the Intangible Cultural Heritage in Bogotá, the programme was inscribed in the Register of Good Safeguarding Practices (decision 14.COM 10.c.3). This register recognises not just the traditions themselves but the methods used to protect them.

The file was submitted jointly by three communities: the APA, the Palmeros del Valle del Espíritu Santo (also in Nueva Esparta), and the Palmeros de Pedregal (Chacao, Miranda). UNESCO cited the shift from cutting to pruning, the nursery programme, and the educational work with children as reasons for inscription.

== See also ==
- La Asunción, Venezuela
- Nueva Esparta
- Holy Week
- Intangible Cultural Heritage of Humanity
- Convention for the Safeguarding of the Intangible Cultural Heritage

== Sources ==
- Guillén Montero, Mario (1 April 2023). "Palmeros asuntinos cumplen con el fervor y devoción del pueblo". El Sol de Margarita.
- García, Luzmary Pastora (2024). Palmeros Asuntinos: Hilos de Ancestralidad, Tradición, Religiosidad e Identidad. Margarita Island, Venezuela: Producciones VAVOS. Depósito Legal NE2024000003.
- Marcano, Bernabé (1997). Palmeros Asuntinos en dos Tiempos. Nueva Esparta: Alcaldía de Arismendi.
