= Battle of Maracapana =

1560s battle

The Battle of Maracapana (1567 or 1568) was an important military engagement between the Spanish conquistadors and their allied indigenous people, and the coalition of Caribbean tribes who were led by Guaicaipuro and commanded by Chief Tiuna. The battle finished with the defeat of the Caribbean power in the Caracas Valley, Venezuela where Spanish intentions for colonization had been held at bay for 7 years.

== Battle ==
In 1568, while Diego de Losada had been camping out in Santiago de León of Caracas’s recently established villa, Guaicaipuro worked to convince all the surrounding chiefs to join, with a large quantity of soldiers, in the Maracapana Savannah (place of the Maracas). The Maracapana Savannah is a plain close to the Catia Laguna with groupings of palm trees and gourd trees that were very valuable to the native people, where they would take gourds to make maracas. The Savannah is in the vicinity of what is now the West Park and Sucre Plaza (Parque del Oeste y Plaza Sucre) in the City of Caracas. From this elevated site of the Caracas Valley, a general attack would be fought against the conquistadors with the leverage to accomplish a definite victory because of the surprise factor. As the day arrived, the Caribbean coalition armies gathered in the indicated place. There were 16 chiefs, in total, who originated from the coast and interim mountain ranges. Many of the chiefs did not come due to the bad timing and lack of coordination. Tiuna brought 4,000 soldiers together and marched towards the battle camp where they were united with Guaicamacuto and Aricabuto. Shortly after they were also united with Naiguatá, Uripatá, Anarigua, Mamacuri, Querequemare, Prepocunate, Baruta, Chacao, Araguaire and Guarauguta with 7,000 soldiers; in representation of the marches (a Venezuelan tribe) they came with 3,000 men commanded by Aricabuto and Aramaipuro.
