= Chacao (cacique) =

16th-century Kalina cacique

Chacao was a 16th-century Kalina cacique who governed in the region of the valley of Caracas, at the time called San Francisco, in present-day Venezuela. Today the region, Chacao Municipality, Miranda, bears his name.

Around 1567, Chacao was taken prisoner by Juan de Gamez upon the orders of Diego de Losada, who had told him to go out and capture natives; Losada later slackened the order. Losada's reasons for the order remain unknown, but it has been suggested that he wanted to befriend the cacique before attempting to pacify the region. Regardless, in 1568, Chacao allied himself with Guaicaipuro and several other local chiefs in a futile attempt to stop the advance of the conquistadors; they were beaten, by the same Losada, in the Battle of Maracapana.
