= Luis de Narváez (conquistador) =

Luis de Narváez (?, Antequera – 1562) was a Spanish conquistador. He was killed in January 1562 near present-day Caracas, Venezuela, by indigenous people led by Guaicaipuro. De Narváez had been attempting to support an expedition against the Indians led by Francisco Fajardo.

He may be related to the sixteenth-century Spanish composer Luis de Narváez.
