= Chacao =

Chacao may refer to the following articles:

- Chacao Municipality - a municipality of Caracas, Venezuela
- Teatro Municipal de Chacao, Caracas Venezuela
- Chacao station, a station of Caracas Metro
- Chacao, Chile, a village in northern Chiloé Island
- Chacao Channel, a channel separating Chiloé Island from the mainland
- Chacao Channel bridge
- Deportivo Chacao F.C., a former Venezuelan football club (soccer team)
- Chacao (cacique), a Venezuelan cacique from the 16th century
- Chacao Indian
  - Cunco people of the Chiloé Archipelago in southern Chile
