= Enabling act =

Act of law enabling an agency such as an executive branch to take actions

An enabling act is a piece of legislation by which a legislative body grants an entity which depends on it (for authorization or legitimacy) for the delegation of the legislative body's power to take certain actions. For example, enabling acts often establish government agencies to carry out specific government policies in a modern nation. The effects of enabling acts from different times and places vary widely.

== Germany ==
The German word for an enabling act is Ermächtigungsgesetz (lit. 'empowering law'). It usually refers to the enabling act of 23 March 1933 which became a cornerstone of Adolf Hitler's seizure of power.

=== Acts of 1914–1927 ===
The first enabling act is dated from 4 August 1914 just after the German entry into World War I. With the vote of the Social Democratic Party, the Reichstag (the German Empire's parliament) agreed to give the government certain powers to take the necessary economic measures during the war. Such enabling acts were also common in other countries. The Reichstag had to be informed, and had the right to abolish a decree based on the enabling act. This ensured that the government used its rights with care and only in rare cases was a decree abolished. The parliament retained its right to make law.

In the Weimar Republic (1919–1933), there were several enabling acts: three in 1919, one in 1920, one in 1921, three in 1923, one in 1926, and one in 1927. The enabling act on 24 February 1923, originally limited until 1 June but extended until 31 October, empowered the cabinet to resist the occupation of the Ruhr. There was an enabling act on 13 October 1923 and an enabling act on 8 December 1923 that would last until the dissolution of the Reichstag on 13 March 1924.

Most of them had a temporal limit but only vague thematic limits. On the basis of these acts, a vast number of decrees were signed with enormous importance for social and economic life, the judicial system, and taxes. For example, the reform of German currency in response to hyperinflation, the merger of the Länderbahnen into the Deutsche Reichsbahn national railway system, and unemployment pay were settled via such decrees (Vollmacht-Verordnungen). The Emminger Reform of 4 January 1924 abolished the jury as trier of fact and replaced it with a mixed system of judges and lay judges in Germany's judiciary which still exists today.

These enabling acts were unconstitutional, as the Weimar constitution did not provide the possibility that one organ (parliament) would transfer its rights to another one (executive government). But constitutional experts accepted them because they came into existence with a two-thirds majority, the same majority as for constitutional changes. The government had succeeded in gathering those majorities by threatening to call for presidential emergency dictatorial decrees (Notverordnungen), otherwise. In March 1924, the Reichstag wanted to discuss the abolition of decrees (which were granted by the enabling act of February that year). President Friedrich Ebert dismissed parliament to avoid discussion and abolishments.

In later years, governments failed to gather two-thirds of majorities since the radicalization of the revolutionary national-conservative German National People's Party in 1928 and the rise of the National Socialist Workers' Party (Nazi Party) after 1930. Chancellor Heinrich Brüning (1930–1932) worked with presidential decrees which replaced most of the ordinary legislature, eventually.

The enabling acts had set a poor and dangerous example, but for the government, they had the advantage that they appeared less unconstitutional and dictatorial compared to presidential decrees. Parliament could prefer those acts because they were valid only for a limited time and included mostly a kind of cooperation (e.g. via a special house committee).

=== Enabling Act of 1933 ===
The German word Ermächtigungsgesetz usually refers to the Enabling Act of 1933, officially Gesetz zur Behebung der Not von Volk und Reich ("Law to Remedy the Distress of the People and the State"). It became a cornerstone of Adolf Hitler's seizure of power. Unlike, for example, Wilhelm Marx's enabling act of December 1923, Hitler's Act:

- was limited to four years, not several months;
- enabled government not only to create decrees, but even laws and treaties with other countries;
- allowed laws to deviate from the Weimar Constitution;
- did not impose thematic limits;
- did not provide a right to control or abolish these laws, not for any house committee nor the Reichsrat (the common organ of the states of Germany).

In comparison to the situation of the 1920s, Hitler's Nazi Party and his coalition partner the DNVP did have a parliamentary majority since the general elections of 3 March 1933. Those elections and then the voting in the Reichstag were carried out in a climate of intimidation and violence carried out by right-wing paramilitary groups such as the Nazi Sturmabteilung. On 23 March, the Communist Party of Germany was already banned and its delegates imprisoned, the Social Democrat delegates were the only ones present in the Reichstag to vote against, while the Centre Party and centre-right parties voted yes.

The Enabling Act of 1933 was renewed by a purely Nazi Reichstag in 1937 and 1939. In 1941 and 1943, it was renewed by decree, though without a time limit in 1943. Although it states that it is valid only for the duration of the current Hitler government of 1933, it remained in force even after major changes of ministers. In any case, Hitler called the cabinet together only very rarely after the first months of 1933. The last cabinet meeting happened in 1937. He preferred to govern via decrees and personal orders.

=== Federal Republic ===
Following the enactment in 1949 of the Basic Law (Grundgesetz), there have been no enabling acts in the Federal Republic of Germany. The constitution states that it can be changed only by an explicit alteration of the phrasing.

== United Kingdom ==
=== Act of 1919 ===
The Church of England Assembly (Powers) Act 1919 (9 & 10 Geo. 5. c. 76) gave a considerable degree of self-government to the Church of England while retaining overall parliamentary supervision. Before its passing, almost all adjustments to the legal structure of the Church of England had involved getting a specific bill through Parliament. It took nine sessions to approve the salary of the Archdeacon of Cornwall, and of the 217 bills introduced into the House of Commons between 1880 and 1913, only 33 passed into law for lack of parliamentary time, among the casualties being the bills to establish new dioceses.

The act gave the newly established Church Assembly, predecessor of the General Synod, power to prepare and present to Parliament measures which could either be approved or rejected, but not modified by either House. Before being voted on, the proposals were examined by an Ecclesiastical Committee of both Houses which reported on their effects and implications. Once approved in Parliament, the measure became law on receiving royal assent.

The act continues to apply today to the General Synod of the Church of England which, as a result of the Synodical Government Measure 1969, replaced the Church Assembly with the aim of achieving full integration of the laity and eliminating the complications caused by the dual control of the Convocations of Canterbury and York, and the Assembly. All the Assembly's powers passed to the new synod along with many of those of the Convocations.

=== Proposals ===
In the 1930s, both Sir Stafford Cripps and Clement Attlee advocated an enabling act to allow a future Labour government to pass socialist legislation which could not be amended by normal parliamentary procedures and the House of Lords. According to Cripps, his "Planning and Enabling Act" would not be able to be repealed, and the orders made by the government using the act would not be allowed discussion in Parliament. Cripps also suggested measures against the monarchy, but quickly dropped the idea.

During the Great Depression and World War II, Oswald Mosley's British Union of Fascists pledged to enact an enabling act establishing a corporatist dictatorship if it were allowed to form a government. It would have totally nationalized the economy into a national corporation with 25 affiliates represented in the government through a reformed House of Lords, abolished the House of Commons' legislative authority, and allowed a royally-appointed Prime Minister and Cabinet to rule by decree through Orders in Council. In 1966 Oswald Mosley advocated a government of national unity drawn from "the professions, from science, from the unions and the managers, from businessmen, the housewives, from the services, from the universities, and even from the best of the politicians". This coalition would be a "hard centre" oriented one which would also get Parliament to pass an enabling act in order to stop what Mosley described as "time-wasting obstructionism of present procedure". He also claimed that Parliament would always retain the power to dismiss his government by a motion of censure if its policies failed or if it attempted to "override basic British freedoms".

=== Legislative and Regulatory Reform Act 2006 ===
In early 2006 the Legislative and Regulatory Reform Bill was introduced to Parliament. This bill, if enacted as introduced, would have enabled government ministers to amend or repeal any legislation (including the L&RR act itself), subject to vague and highly subjective restraints, by decree and without recourse to Parliament. The bill was variously described as the "Abolition of Parliament Bill" and "of first-class constitutional significance ... [and would] markedly alter the respective and long standing roles of minister and Parliament in the legislative process". The bill was, in essence, an enabling act in all but name. After some amendment by the government and Lords, the Legislative and Regulatory Reform Bill received royal assent on 8 November 2006. Amendments included removing its ability to modify itself or the Human Rights Act 1998; most of the other modifications were much more subjectively defined.

== United States ==
At the state government level, state enabling acts allow local jurisdictions to make laws regarding certain issues on the state's behalf. For example, many states passed their own version of the Standard State Zoning Enabling Act, which enabled municipalities to regulate land use with local zoning laws. Other enabling acts have allowed municipalities to establish foreign-trade zones, collect impact fees, or create public utilities.

== Venezuela ==
In Venezuela, enabling laws allowing the president to rule by decree in selected matters were granted to Rómulo Betancourt (1959), Carlos Andrés Pérez (1974), Jaime Lusinchi (1984), Ramón José Velásquez (1993) and Rafael Caldera (1994). Pérez issued over 3,000 decrees under the powers delegated to him.

In mid-2000, a similar law enabled Hugo Chávez to legislate on issues related to the economy, reorganization of government ministries and crime for one year. Chávez did not take advantage of this act until shortly before its expiration, when he passed 49 decrees in rapid succession, many of them highly controversial. In 2007, a new enabling act granted President Chávez powers for 18 months, giving the president the ability to rule by decree over certain economic, social, territorial, defense and scientific matters as well as control over transportation, regulations for popular participation and rules for governing state institutions.

== See also ==
- 2017 Turkish constitutional referendum, which some media outlets have compared to the Enabling Act of 1933
- Primary and secondary legislation
