= Enabling law in Venezuela =

The Enabling law in Venezuela was created as article 203 of the 1999 constitution. Through this law, the National Assembly gives the president its main power - which is to pass laws, for a period of no more than 180 days. This period was later lengthened. The current Enabling law has been granted to Hugo Chávez (2000, 2007, 2010) and to Nicolás Maduro (2013, 2015).

== See also ==
- History of Venezuela
- Enabling act
