= Rule by decree =

Style of governance

Rule by decree is a style of governance in which a single person or small group makes law directly, without the usual approval of a legislature. It is commonly associated with dictatorships and with states of emergency, in which constitutional emergency provisions or an enabling act transfer lawmaking power to the executive, bypassing the ordinary process of making laws.

== Historical examples ==
=== Second Triumvirate ===
After the assassination of Julius Caesar in 44 BC, Octavian, Mark Antony and Lepidus formed the Second Triumvirate. The Lex Titia, a law carried through the plebeian council by the tribune Publius Titius on 27 November 43 BC, gave the three men power for five years to make laws and appoint magistrates without reference to the Senate or the popular assemblies. The term nominally lapsed at the end of 38 BC and was renewed at Tarentum in 37 BC for a further five years. Lepidus was stripped of his powers in 36 BC, and the renewed term expired at the end of 33 BC as Octavian and Antony moved toward the War of Actium.

=== Reichstag Fire Decree (1933) ===
Article 48 of the Weimar Constitution allowed the Reich President to issue emergency decrees with the force of law. President Friedrich Ebert used it on 136 occasions, and from 1930, when the Reichstag could no longer produce a working majority, the governments of Heinrich Brüning, Franz von Papen and Kurt von Schleicher relied on presidential decrees as their ordinary method of legislating. After the Reichstag fire on 27 February 1933, Chancellor Adolf Hitler persuaded President Paul von Hindenburg to issue the Reichstag Fire Decree, which suspended most civil liberties indefinitely and allowed the government to detain political opponents without trial. Together with the Enabling Act of 1933 passed the following month, it let the government legislate without the Reichstag. The constitution was never formally repealed, and the resulting state of exception lasted in a technical sense until 1945.

=== Indian Emergency (1975–1977) ===
On 25 June 1975, at Prime Minister Indira Gandhi's request, President Fakhruddin Ali Ahmed declared a state of emergency under Article 352 of the Constitution of India. Two weeks earlier the Allahabad High Court had found Gandhi guilty of electoral malpractice, voiding her 1971 election to parliament and barring her from elected office for six years. During the Emergency the government ruled largely through presidential ordinances, arrested thousands of opposition politicians, suspended habeas corpus and censored the press. The 39th Amendment, enacted on 10 August 1975 by a Parliament from which much of the opposition had been jailed, placed the election of the prime minister beyond judicial review, nullifying the effect of the Allahabad ruling. Gandhi called elections in 1977, lost, and resigned.

=== Russia (1993) ===
During the 1993 Russian constitutional crisis, President Boris Yeltsin issued Decree No. 1400 on 21 September 1993, dissolving the Supreme Soviet and the Congress of People's Deputies. The Constitutional Court, sitting overnight, ruled the decree unconstitutional. After the parliament building was shelled and the Supreme Soviet dispersed on 4 October, Yeltsin governed by decree until the current Constitution was adopted by referendum on 12 December 1993.

=== Venezuela ===
Venezuelan President Hugo Chávez was granted power by the National Assembly to rule by decree several times during his tenure, passing hundreds of laws. Chávez ruled by decree in 2000, 2001, 2004, 2005, 2006, 2007, 2008, 2010, 2011 and 2012. Between 2004 and 2006 alone, Chávez declared 18 emergencies in order to rule by decree.

Nicolás Maduro, who succeeded Chávez in 2013, was granted decree powers by the National Assembly in November 2013 and again in March 2015. After the opposition won control of the Assembly in the December 2015 election, Maduro declared a state of economic emergency on 15 January 2016. The Assembly rejected the decree on 22 January, but the Supreme Tribunal of Justice ruled that it was valid without the Assembly's approval, and Maduro governed under repeated two-month extensions of the decree, renewing it for the eighth time in May 2017 and the tenth in July 2017. Maduro remained in office until January 2026, when he was captured in a United States military operation.

== Legal situation ==
Some democratic constitutions permit the executive to legislate by decree during emergencies, subject to legal limits. In France, Article 16 of the 1958 Constitution allows the president to take exceptional measures when the institutions of the Republic are under serious and immediate threat; it has been invoked once, by Charles de Gaulle from 23 April to 29 September 1961 following the Algiers putsch of 1961. In Argentina, Article 99 of the constitution permits the president to issue "decrees of necessity and urgency", which Congress may reject under a procedure set out in Law 26.122 of 2006. In Mexico, Article 29 of the constitution allows the president to suspend constitutional guarantees with the approval of Congress.

Similar provisions exist elsewhere. In Ireland, the Emergency Powers Act allows the government to rule by decrees called Emergency Powers Orders in any aspect of national life if the parliament invokes the emergency clause in Article 28(3) of the Constitution; the Dáil Éireann may void specific orders in a free vote or end the state of emergency at any time. In the United Kingdom, Part 2 of the Civil Contingencies Act 2004 allows a senior minister to make emergency regulations by statutory instrument, which lapse unless approved by both Houses of Parliament within seven days.

Other instruments, such as French decrees, orders in council in the Commonwealth, and executive orders in the United States, are partly based on the notion of a decree but are far more limited in scope and generally subject to judicial review.

== Analysis ==
Italian philosopher Giorgio Agamben has argued that the use of decree-laws, presidential decrees, executive orders and similar instruments has expanded sharply since World War I, and that the state of exception has become the dominant paradigm of government in contemporary politics.

Political scientist Desmond King has characterised Donald Trump's reliance on executive orders in his second term, which included 142 orders in its first 100 days, as governing by decree. Executive orders differ from decrees in that they must rest on the president's constitutional powers or on authority delegated by Congress, and courts may set aside orders that exceed that authority.

== See also ==
- Carlos Ibáñez del Campo – rule in Chile during the Presidential Republic
- COVID-19 pandemic in Hungary#Rule by decree
- Enabling act
- State of emergency
