= Mission Guaicaipuro =

Misión Guaicaipuro (launched 12 October 2003) is one of the Bolivarian Missions initiated by former Venezuelan president Hugo Chávez. The program is carried out by the Venezuelan Ministry of Environment and Natural Resources. It seeks to restore communal land titles and human rights to Venezuela's numerous indigenous communities, in addition to defending these rights against resource and financial speculation by the dominant culture. The mission is named for the famous Venezuelan indigenous tribal chief Guaicaipuro, who was instrumental in leading native resistance against Spanish colonization of Venezuela.

== Development ==
=== First stage ===
The mission was originally created by Presidential Decree 3,040 in 2004, under the Ministry of Environment and Natural Resources. In 2005 he was attached to the Ministry of Participation and Social Development.

=== Second stage ===
On 29 August 2007, by Decree 5,551, there was a partial reform and the Presidential Commission Guaicaipuro Mission was established in Ordinary Gazette number 38758, was then attached to the Ministry of Popular Power for Indigenous Peoples.

== See also ==
- Urban Land Committees
