= Guaicaipuro =

Native Venezuelan chief

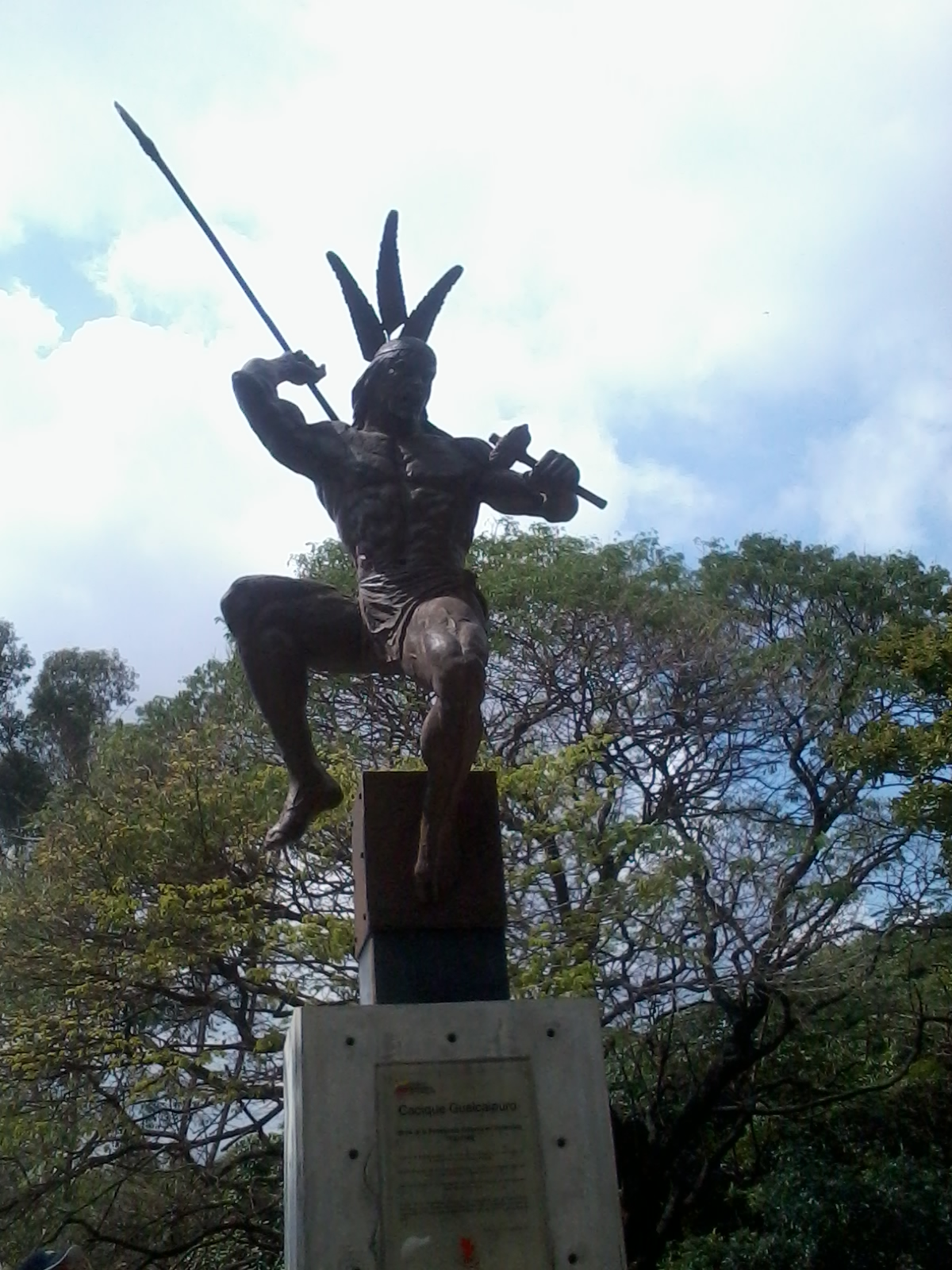
- A statue of Guaicaipuro
- Born: c. 1530; Northern Venezuela Province (present day Los Teques, Venezuela)
- Died: 1568 (aged 37-38); Paracotos, Venezuela Province, Spanish Empire

Cacique Guaicaipuro was an Indigenous chief of both the Teques and Caracas tribes in what is today Venezuela. Though known today as Guaicaipuro, in documents of the time his name was written Guacaipuro.

== Life ==
Guaicaipuro formed a powerful coalition of different tribes which he led during part of the 16th century against the Spanish conquest of Venezuelan territory in the central region of the country, especially in the Caracas valley. He commanded, among others, Caciques (Spanish: Indian chief) Naiguatá, Guaicamacuto, Chacao, Aramaipuro, Paramaconi and his own son Baruta. Guaicaipuro is one of the most famous and celebrated Venezuelan caciques. The area occupied by the Teques was populated by several native groups each with its own cacique. Guaicaipuro's tribe, which was located in what is now San Antonio de los Altos, was the largest one. His son Baruta was himself a cacique. The names of two of his sisters are also known: Tiora and Caycape.

The Spaniards discovered gold in the area of the land of the Teques, and as they started to exploit the mines, Guaicaipuro attacked, forcing the Spanish to leave. Following the attack, the governor of the province of Venezuela sent Juan Rodríguez Suárez to pacify the area, which apparently he did after defeating Guaicaipuro in several engagements. Believing he had achieved his task, the Spanish commander and his soldiers left the area leaving behind miners and three of his sons. Once the Spanish soldiers had left, Guiacaipuro assaulted the mines killing all the workers as well as the sons of Rodríguez Suárez. Immediately thereafter, Rodríguez Suárez who was on his way to the city of Valencia, with a small contingent of only six soldiers, with the purpose of meeting Lope de Aguirre, another Spanish conquistador, was ambushed by Guaicaipuro and killed.

After these successes Guaicaipuro became the main and central figure in the uprising of all the native tribes in the vicinity of the Caracas valley, and managed to unite all the tribes under his command. In 1562 they defeated an expeditionary force led by Luis Narváez. Due to the fierce attacks, the Spanish retreated away from the area for several years.

In 1567 the city of Santiago de Leon de Caracas was founded in the Caracas valley. The Spanish worried about the nearby presence of Guaicaipuro and his men, and given his previous attacks, they decided not to wait for him to attack, and as a pre-emptive move Diego de Losada, (founder of Caracas) ordered the mayor of the city, Francisco de Infante to undertake Guacaipuro's capture. In 1568 Infante and his men were led by native guides to the hut where Guaicaipuro lived and they set it on fire to force the native cacique out. Guaicaipuro was then killed by the Spanish soldiers.

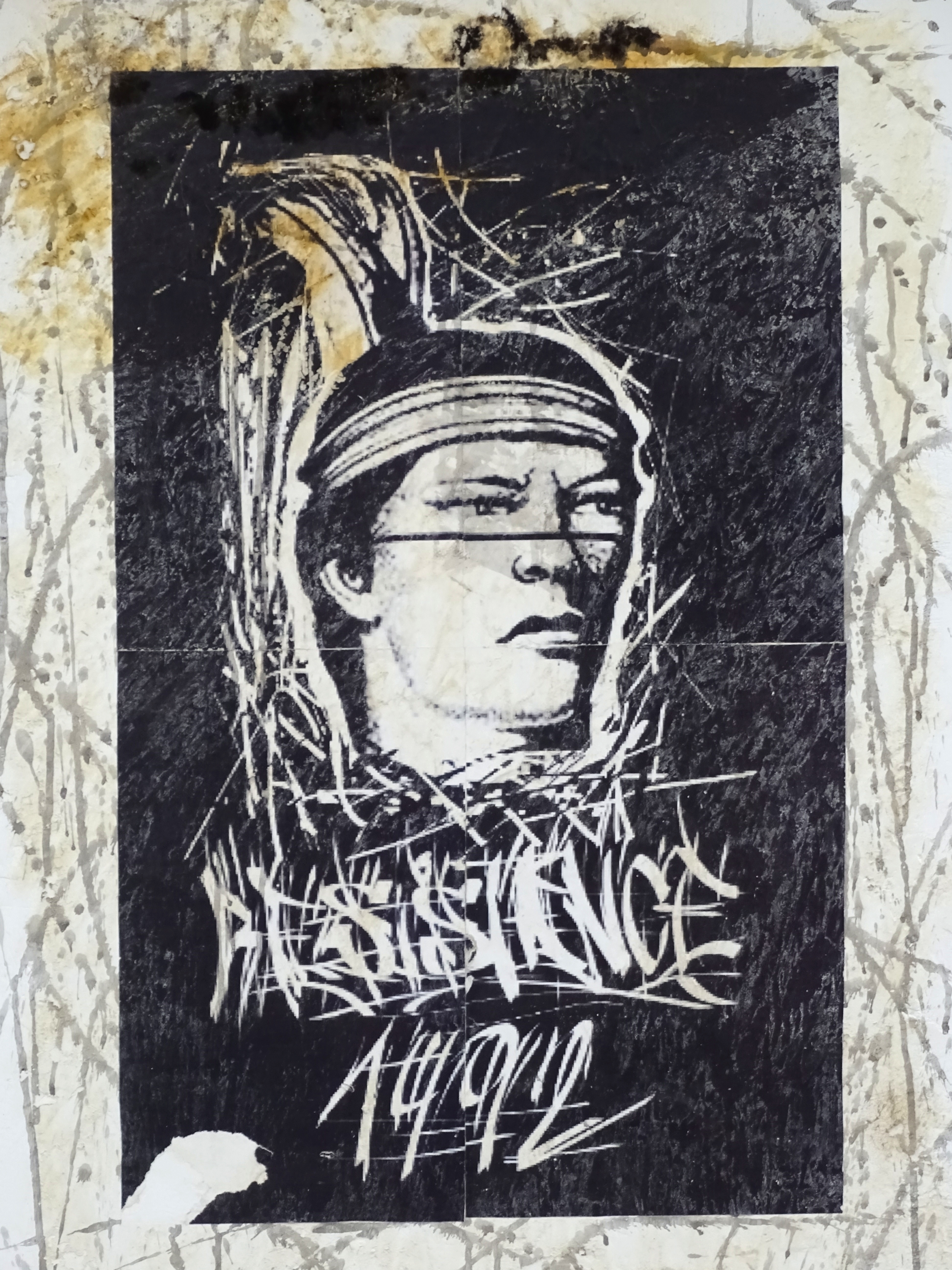
Image of Guaicaipuro in San Cristóbal de las Casas, Chiapas, Mexico.

== Spiritism ==
Guacaipuro is one of the main figures in Venezuelan spiritism, alongside María Lionza and Negro Felipe.

== Legacy ==
The county of Guaicaipuro in the state of Miranda, Venezuela was named in his honor. Later the county became the Guaicaipuro Municipality.

Amidst the new policy started by former president Hugo Chávez of re-assessing and valuing the role of Venezuela's caciques and indigenous peoples in a historical narrative which has traditionally given greater prominence to the Spanish conquistadores, Guaicaipuro's remains were symbolically moved (his actual remains have never been found) under ceremonial pomp to the national pantheon on December 8, 2001.

Under the same policy, Chávez often mentioned Guaicaipuro and other native chiefs in his speeches with the purpose of inspiring Venezuelans to resist what he called the policies of American imperialists and interventionists directed towards Venezuela. Most notably, he did this every year during the October 12 holiday, which after being renamed several years ago Dia de la Raza (previously Americas Discovery Day), was renamed as Día de la Resistencia Indígena (Day of Indigenous Resistance). In 2015, a statue of Guacaipuro was unveiled in Plaza Venezuela in honor of this day.

The Venezuelan government named as Mission Guaicaipuro one of its ongoing Bolivarian Missions; this specific program seeks to restore communal land titles and human rights to Venezuela's remaining 33 indigenous tribes.

== See also ==
- European colonization of the Americas
