= Diego de Losada =

Spanish conquistador (1511-c. 1569)

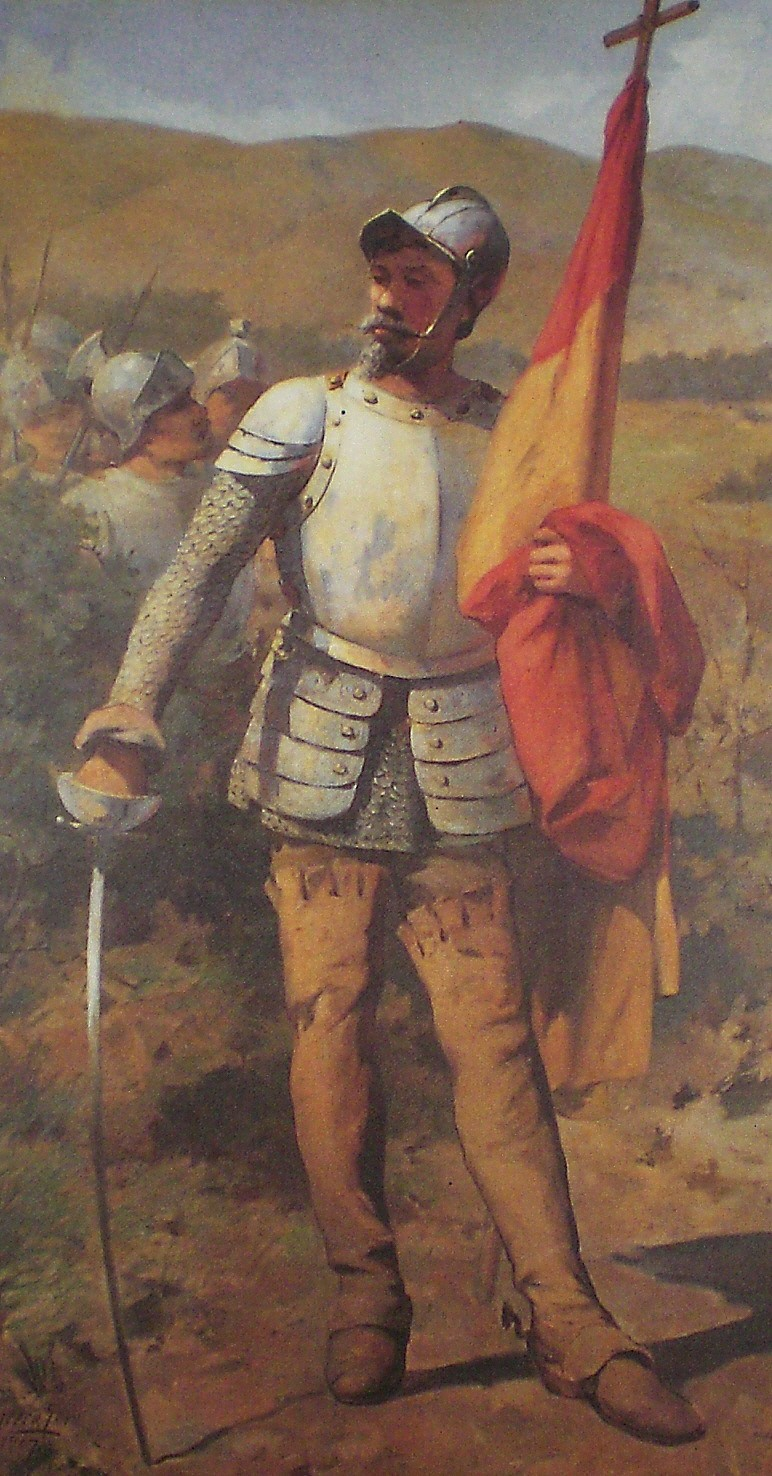
- Portrait of de Losada by Antonio Herrera Toro (1857-1914)

Signature
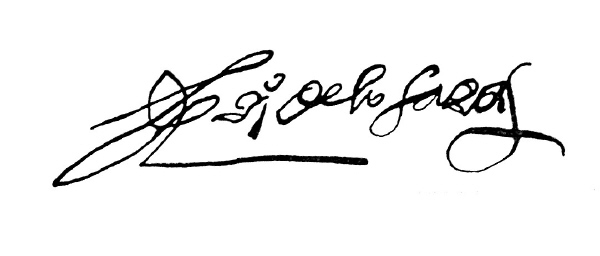

Diego de Losada (1511 – c. 1569) was a Spanish conquistador and the founder of Caracas, Venezuela.

Diego de Losada was born in 1511 into a minor noble family of northwestern Spain, the son of Álvaro Pérez de Losada, Lord of Rionegro, and Catalina de Osorio. He grew up in his native town of Rionegro del Puente and entered the service of the Count of Benavente at the age of fifteen. There he received a military education alongside other young nobles, including Pedro de Reinoso. In 1533, Losada and Reinoso sailed to the Caribbean, arriving first in Puerto Rico and soon afterward in Venezuela.

Losada initially joined the expedition of Antonio Sedeño, who sought wealth by exploring the Meta River under orders from Governor Ortal. By 1536, the expedition had reached Maracapana and entered the Venezuelan savannah. The campaign was marked by severe abuses against Indigenous peoples and internal discord among the Spaniards. After the Dominican Audiencia ordered Sedeño's arrest he was poisoned during the return journey. The expedition fractured and Losada assumed command of one faction. Disagreements led the groups to separate and Losada eventually made his way to Coro, where he gained the confidence of provincial authorities.

Over the next decade, Losada became involved in the turbulent politics of early colonial Venezuela. He served under several governors, including Juan Pérez de Tolosa, who appointed him field marshal. In 1546, Losada participated in the arrest and execution of Juan de Carvajal, a controversial official who had defied royal authority. Under Tolosa and his successor Juan de Villegas, Losada took part in exploratory campaigns south of El Tocuyo and took part in the founding of Nueva Segovia de Barquisimeto in 1552. During this period he accumulated significant encomiendas, held municipal offices in Barquisimeto and El Tocuyo, and established himself as a prominent settler. He married Catalina de Rojas and had several children.

In 1565, Governor Alonso Bernáldez de Quirós commissioned Losada to pacify the Caracas region, a charge confirmed by Pedro Ponce de León. Departing El Tocuyo in January 1567 with a large force, he confronted fierce resistance from Indigenous groups led by Guaicaipuro. After securing victories in the region, he founded Santiago de León de Caracas, now known better as simply Caracas, probably on July 25, 1567. He later established Nuestra Señora de Carballeda to secure coastal access. In 1568, he suppressed a confederation of caciques organized to attack the new settlement.

Following the death of Governor Ponce de León in 1569, Losada sought appointment as governor of Venezuela. He presented his credentials in Santo Domingo and petitioned the Crown, but the position was granted to another candidate. Disappointed, he returned to Venezuela, where he died shortly thereafter, probably in 1569 or 1570. The precise location and date of his death remain uncertain.

== Sources ==
- Howgego, Raymond John, ed. (2003). "Losada, Diego de". Encyclopedia of Exploration to 1800. Hordern House. ISBN 1875567364.
- Lucena Salmoral, Manuel (2008). "Diego de Losada y Quiroga". Real Academia de la Historia (in Spanish).
- Quintero, Ines (2008). "Losada, Diego de". Encyclopedia of Latin American history and culture. Detroit: Gale.
