= Viernes Rojo =

Economic measures implemented by Nicolás Maduro

Viernes Rojo (Red Friday) in Venezuela refers to Friday, 17 August 2018, when President Nicolás Maduro announced a series of economic reforms known as "Program of Recovery, Growth and Economic Prosperity", in response to increasing hyperinflation. This event is also known as Paquetazo Rojo (Red Package) or Madurazo by some media outlets. These reforms include the introduction of the a new currency with five fewer zeros, increase the minimum wage based on the Petro and increase VAT to 16%. According to President Maduro, these reforms have the goal of recovering the population's salary in two years through the Economic Recovery of Growth and Prosperity program, to eliminate the fiscal deficit and to eliminate the use of paper money.

Economists and experts argued that the economic measures lacked coherence and would contribute with increasing hyperinflation, indicating that they would have a much greater impact than the Black Friday of 1983 under President Luis Herrera Campins, El Gran Viraje of President Carlos Andrés Pérez in 1989 or Agenda Venezuela of President Rafael Caldera in 1996.

== History ==
Venezuela's hyperinflation began in November 2016. Inflation of Venezuela's hard bolívar (VEF) in 2014 reached 69% and was the highest in the world. In 2015, inflation was 181%, the highest in the world and the highest in the country's history at that time, 800% in 2016 and over 4,000% in 2017 with Venezuela spiraling into hyperinflation. While the Venezuelan government "has essentially stopped" producing official inflation estimates as of early 2018, one estimate of the rate at that time was 5,220%, according to inflation economist Steve Hanke of Johns Hopkins University.

Inflation has affected Venezuelans so much that in 2017, some people became video game gold farmers and could be seen playing games such as RuneScape to sell in-game currency or characters for real currency. In many cases, these gamers made more money than salaried workers in Venezuela even though they were earning just a few dollars per day. During the Christmas season of 2017, some shops would no longer use price tags since prices would inflate so quickly, so customers were required to ask staff at stores how much each item was.

The Bs.F 2 and Bs.F 5 notes were no longer found in circulation due to the inflation, but remain legal tender until they were demonetized in August 2018. By early-December 2016, the Bs.F 100 note, Venezuela's largest denomination of currency, was only worth about US$0.23 on the black market.

=== Recent solutions to counter inflation ===
On 7 December 2016, a new series of banknotes (recolors of the previous notes) in denominations of Bs.F 500, Bs.F 1,000, Bs.F 2,000, Bs.F 5,000, Bs.F 10,000, and Bs.F 20,000 was unveiled to the Venezuelan public. In November 2017, a Bs.F 100,000 note was unveiled which is similar to the Bs.F 100 note of the 2007 series and the Bs.F 20,000 of the 2016 series, but with the denomination spelled out in full instead of adding an additional three zeros to the number 100. This denomination was worth US$2.42 through black market exchange rates at the date of its release, but by July 2018 increasing hyperinflation had reduced its value by 99.9%, to less than US$0.01.

On 11 December 2016, President Nicolás Maduro wrote into law that the Bs.F 100 would be pulled from circulation within 72 hours because "mafias" were allegedly storing those particular notes to drive inflation. With more than 6 billion Bs.F 100 notes issued consisting of 46% of Venezuela's issued currency, Maduro enacted an exchange for Venezuelan citizens to transfer all Bs.F 100 notes for Bs.F 100 coins while also blocking international travel to prevent the return of the bolívares that were supposedly stockpiled. The government justified the move claiming that the United States was working with crime syndicates to spirit away Venezuela's paper money to warehouses in Europe to cause the fall of the government. The government was thwarting this threat by withdrawing the notes from circulation.

== Measures and reforms ==
=== Sovereign bolívar ===
President Nicolas Maduro announcing economic reforms.

The Maduro government launched the new sovereign bolívar currency, with one sovereign bolívar worth Bs.F 100,000. New coins in denominations of Bs.S 0.50 and Bs.S 1, and new banknotes in denominations of Bs.S 2, Bs.S 5, Bs.S 10, Bs.S 20, Bs.S 50, Bs.S 100, Bs.S 200 and Bs.S 500 were introduced. Under the country's official fixed exchange rate to the US dollar the new currency was devalued by roughly 95% compared to the old hard bolivar. The day was declared a bank holiday to allow the banks to adjust to the new currency. Initially, during a transition period the sovereign bolívar was to be run alongside the hard bolívar. However, from the start of the transition, on 20 August, hard bolívar notes of Bs.F 500 and less could not be used; only deposited at banks.

President Maduro also announced that after the currency redenomination has carried out on 20 August 2018, old denominations with a face value of Bs.F 1,000 or higher will circulate in parallel with the new series of sovereign bolívar notes and will continue to be used for a limited time. Banknotes with a face value below Bs.F 1,000 will be withdrawn from circulation and cease to be legal tender on 20 August 2018.

On 30 November 2018, it was announced that the remaining denominations of the old currency (Bs.F 1,000 or higher) will be withdrawn from circulation and cease to be legal tender on 5 December 2018.

=== Minimum wage ===
The minimum wage was raised from Bs.F 392,646 to Bs.F 180 million (or Bs.S 1,800) per month, a 3,000% or 33-fold increase. The new minimum wage became effective from 1 September 2018.

The new wage is estimated around US$30 per month at the black market rate. According to Bloomberg, the wage reform has caused employers to fire as many workers while some of them are restructuring costs, rearranging pay scales and negotiating settlements with workers.

Given the excessive wage increases, the Maduro government will assume for the next 90 days the differential of the payroll of small and medium-sized enterprises for "that there is no impact on inflation". President Maduro stressed that the new minimum wage will include public and private companies so that there are no excuses to want to increase prices.

=== Sales tax ===
Sales tax (VAT) increased from 12% to 16% in order to have greater money collection and "reach the zero fiscal deficit".

=== Petro ===
The new sovereign bolívar has a fixed exchange rate to the petro, with a rate of Bs.S 3,600 (or Bs.F 360 million) to one petro. The petro's fixed exchange to barrels of oil is one to one (the market value was approximately US$60 at the time of the reforms). As part of the reforms, Venezuelans will be paid at least half a petro per month.

By the end of August 2018, there is no evidence that the cryptocurrency is being traded. Petro is regarded by many as a scam.

=== Bonuses ===
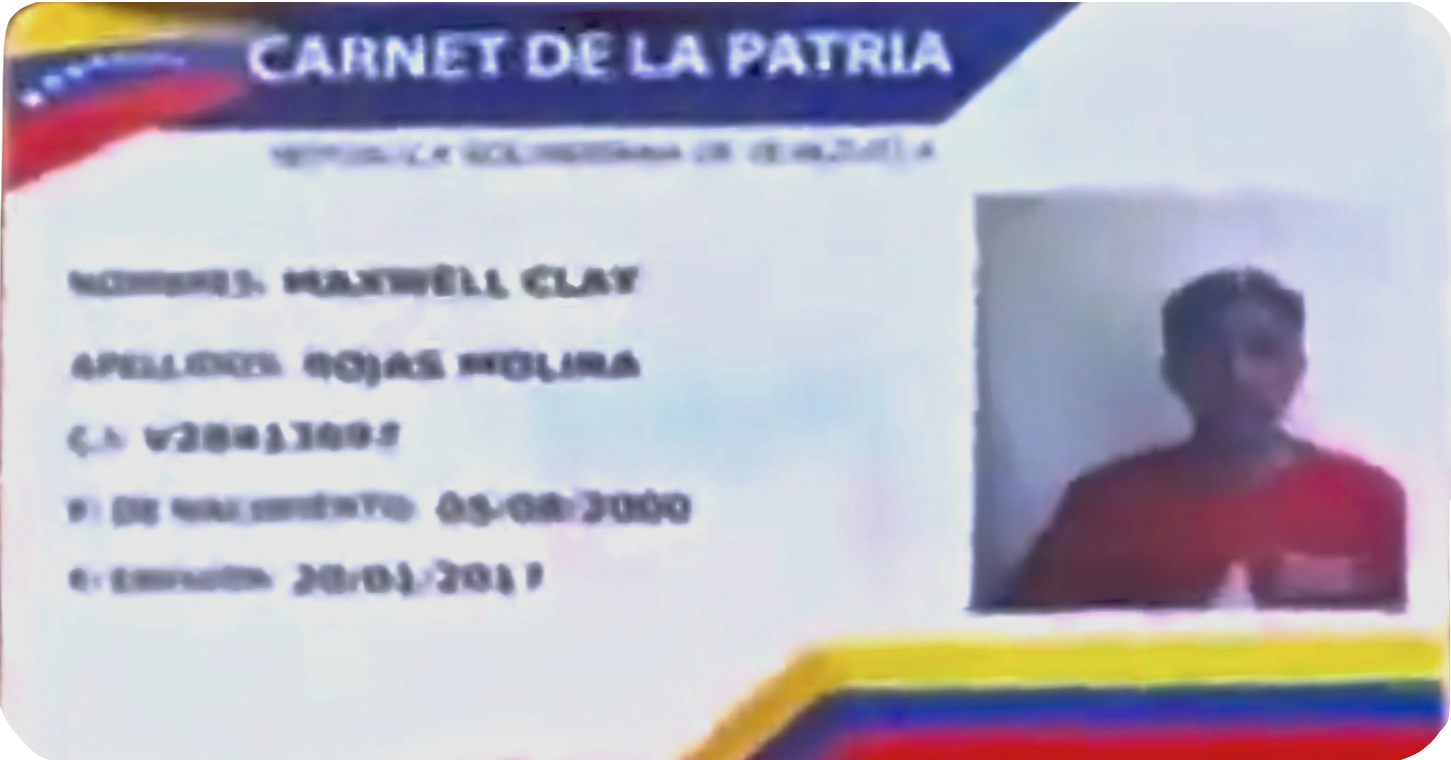
Carnet de la Patria

Holders of the Carnet de la patria are entitled to receive a Bs.S 600 (US$15) bonus. The bonus payment is deposited through the digitized system.

According to ABC, the Homeland card serves a political and social control and that the Venezuelan opposition qualifies as an instrument of blackmail, will only benefit a third of the Venezuelan population.

=== Fuel pricing ===
The new fuel prices are transpired from sources of the oil industry and gas stations that the government is considering a gradual quarterly increase to reach Bs.S 0.90 per liter, that is, to Bs.F 90,000, when it costs Bs.S 6 (US$0.000002) currently.

== Analysis ==
"[President] Maduro today destroyed the bolivar. Until a few minutes ago he could save himself. No longer. Stop telling stories: as of Monday, sell what you sell, set your prices in dollars at the exchange rate, not the day but the time"

— Venezuelan Economist Ángel García Banchs

Economist JL Saboín García pointed out that "the Venezuelan economy faces the strongest macroeconomic adjustment in its history", calling President Maduro's economic reforms as "the Red Friday."

Asdrúbal Oliveros indicated that the announcements have no relation with El Gran Viraje or the Agenda Venezuela that "with their mistakes were much better structured plans regarding goals and policy instruments". Carrying out three considerations, he maintained that the announcements record "a recognition of the black market", an aggressive increase in the minimum wage, which has a significant fiscal cost and a heavy burden on the private sector, as well as an impact on the structure of costs and, therefore, prices »and that, in spite of raising the goal of zero fiscal deficit and announcing new taxes, it is also announced "a rise in current expenses (via salaries and bonuses)", noting that Venezuela's fiscal deficit consists of 20% of its GDP.

Econometrica director Henkel García, defined the salary increase as "crazy", declaring that there will be "the highest daily inflation in our history, I do not know if the whole economic history of the world" and adding that he estimated that next week there would be two variables that would have a huge increase next week, prices and the monetary base.

National Assembly deputy and economist José Guerra said that on the night of the announcements a "mega devaluation " was recorded, explaining that "the official exchange rate jumped in a day from Bs.F 240,000 (Bs.S 2.40) per US$1 to Bs.F 6,000,000 (Bs.S 60) per US$1."

== Effects ==
Following the reform, Reuters investigated the petro six months after its ICO. When visiting the Venezuelan Ministry of Finance headquarters in Caracas, the Superintendent of Cryptocurrencies did not have an office there and their promoted website did not exist. The Atapirire parish, where President Maduro specifically decreed the petro's value would be linked to oil reserves in the area, has seen no petroleum-related activities and the oil rigs in the area appeared small, old and abandoned. Experts in economics stated that it was impossible to link the petro to the sovereign bolívar because no one knows its legitimate value. Though "reservations" were sold by the Venezuelan government to obtain petros, no petros had been released by the Venezuelan government.

On August 25, 2018, the National Superintendence for the Defense of Socioeconomic Rights (SUNDDE) reported that at least 200 people have been arrested and at least 500 businesses sanctioned for violating President Maduro's economic reforms.

By January 2019, the monthly minimum wage was the equivalent of US$5.50 (Bs.S 18,000)—less than the price of a Happy Meal at McDonald's. Ecoanalitica estimated that prices jumped by 465% in the first two-and-a-half months of 2019. The Wall Street Journal stated in March 2019 that the "main cause of hyperinflation is the central bank printing money to fund gaping public spending deficits", reporting that a teacher can buy a dozen eggs and two pounds of cheese with a month's wages.

=== Sovereign bolivar ===
Following the introduction of the sovereign bolívar, inflation increased from 61,463 per cent on 21 August 2018 to 65,320 per cent on 22 August 2018. By 24 August 2018, the introduction of the sovereign bolívar had not prevented hyperinflation. According to inflation analyst Steve Hanke, between 18 August and 21 August 2018, the inflation rate increased from 48,760 percent to 65,320 percent.

On 22 August, DolarToday estimated the free market exchange rate at Bs.S 71.20 per US dollar. AirTM's reported exchange rate was 75.6 VES/USD.

By December 2018, four months after entry into circulation, the Bs.S 2 (about US$0.002 at that time), began being refused in shops and state banks, as its value has significantly declined since redenomination.

As of 21 January 2019, the estimated exchange rate is 2,700 VES/USD in Venezuela's free market according to DolarToday. The rate may vary for other references, with AirTM's exchange rate being 2,200 VES/USD.

By June 2019, further inflation of the sovereign bolivar since redenomination has resulted in the entry of Bs.S 10,000, Bs.S 20,000 and Bs.S 50,000 banknotes into circulation effective on 13 June. The Central Bank of Venezuela said in a statement that the introduction of the new banknotes will "make the payment system more efficient and facilitate commercial transactions." The highest denomination banknote (Bs.S 50,000) is worth US$8 on the black market and is more than the minimum wage of Bs.S 40,000 per month.

== See also ==
- Hyperinflation in Venezuela
- Viernes Negro
