= Hyperinflation in Venezuela =

Increasing inflation rates in Venezuela since 2017

- Part of the crisis in Venezuela
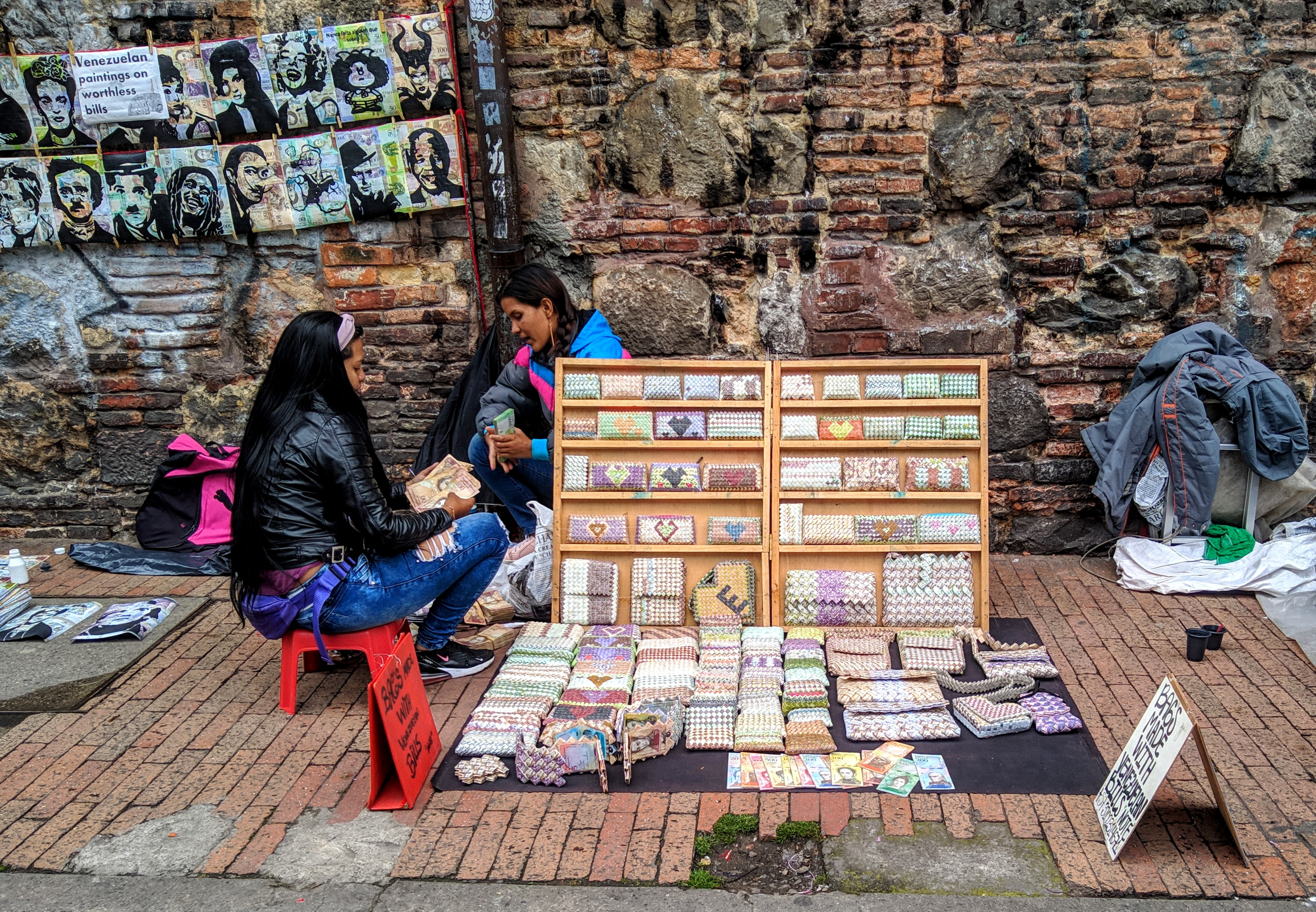
- Venezuelan migrants in Bogotá selling crafts made of worthless Venezuelan banknotes in November 2019
- Date: 2016–early 2022
- Location: Venezuela
- Cause: Government policies, price controls, corruption, currency devaluations, heavy money-printing, and deficit government spending
- Outcome: Large decline in real wages despite continuous nominal wage increases, unemployment, rising prices in goods, redenomination of the Venezuelan bolívar fuerte to the bolívar soberano and then again to the bolívar digital, dollarization, decrease of tax revenues and shortages of foreign currency reserves and goods

Hyperinflation in Venezuela was the currency instability in Venezuela that began in 2016 during the country's ongoing socioeconomic and political crisis. Venezuela began experiencing continuous and uninterrupted inflation in 1983, with double-digit annual inflation rates. Inflation rates became the highest in the world by 2004 under President Hugo Chavez, and continued to increase in the following years, with inflation exceeding 1,000,000% by 2018. In comparison to previous hyperinflationary episodes, the ongoing hyperinflation crisis is more severe than those of Argentina, Bolivia, Brazil, Nicaragua, and Peru in the 1980s and 1990s, and that of Zimbabwe in the late-2000s.

In 2014, the annual inflation rate reached 69%, the highest in the world. In 2015, the inflation rate was 181%, again the highest in the world and the highest in the country's history at the time. The rate reached 800% in 2016, over 4,000% in 2017, and about 1,700,000% in 2018, and reaching 2,000,000%, with Venezuela spiraling into hyperinflation. While the Venezuelan government "had essentially stopped" producing official inflation estimates as of early 2018, inflation economist Steve Hanke estimated the rate at that time to be 5,220%. The Central Bank of Venezuela (BCV) officially estimates that the inflation rate increased to 53,798,500% between 2016 and April 2019. In April 2019, the International Monetary Fund estimated that inflation would reach 10,000,000% by the end of 2019. Several economic controls were lifted by Maduro administration in 2019, which helped to partially tame inflation until May 2020.

In December 2021, economists and the Central Bank of Venezuela announced that in the first quarter of 2022, Venezuela would reach more than 12 months with monthly inflation below 50% after more than four years of a hyperinflationary cycle. This would technically indicate its exit from hyperinflation, but the consequences would remain.

== Background ==
=== Pérez and Caldera administrations ===
When world oil prices collapsed in the 1980s, the economy contracted, and inflation levels (consumer price inflation) rose, remaining between 6 and 12% from 1982 to 1986. In 1989, the inflation rate peaked at 84%. The same year, following a cut in government spending and the opening of markets by President Carlos Andrés Pérez, the capital city of Caracas suffered from looting and rioting. After Pérez initiated liberal economic policies and made Venezuelan markets more free, Venezuela's GDP increased from a −8.3% decline in 1989 to 4.4% in 1990 and 9.2% in 1991, though wages remained low and unemployment remained high among Venezuelans.

While some claim that liberalization was the cause of Venezuelan economic difficulties, an over-reliance on oil prices and a fractured political system have been identified to have caused many of the problems. By the mid-1990s under President Rafael Caldera, Venezuela saw annual inflation rates of 50 to 60% from 1993 to 1997, with an exceptional peak of 100% in 1996. The percentage of people living in poverty rose from 36% in 1984 to 66% in 1995, with the country suffering a severe banking crisis in 1994. In 1998, the economic crisis had worsened, with GDP per capita at the same level as it was in 1963 (after adjusting 1963 dollars to 1998 value), down a third from its peak in 1978; the purchasing power of the average salary was a third of its 1978 level.

=== Chávez and Maduro administrations ===
Following the 1998 Venezuelan presidential election, the inflation rate, measured by consumer price index, was 35.8% in 1998, falling to a low of 12.5% in 2001 but rising to 31.1% in 2003. In an attempt to support the Venezuelan bolívar, bolster the government's declining level of international reserves, and mitigate the impact of the oil industry work stoppage on the economy, the Ministry of Finance and the Central Bank of Venezuela (BCV) suspended foreign exchange trading on 23 January 2003. On 6 February, the government created CADIVI, a currency-control board charged with handling foreign exchange procedures. The board set the USD exchange rate at 1,596 bolívares to the dollar for purchases and 1,600 to the dollar for sales.

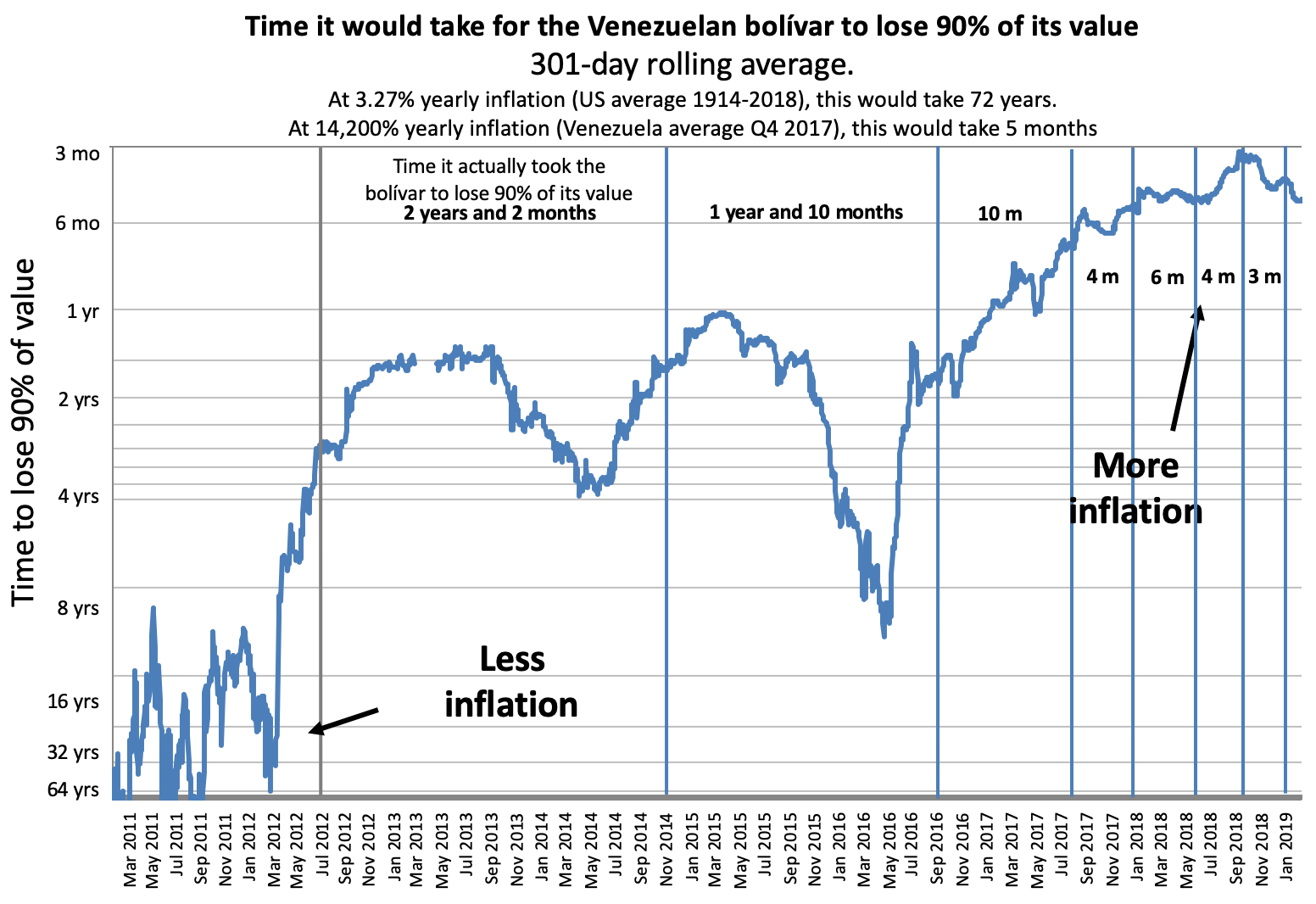
Hyperinflation in Venezuela represented by the time it would take for money to lose 90% of its value (301-day rolling average, inverted logarithmic scale)

The Venezuelan economy shrank 5.8% in the first three months of 2010 compared to the same period in 2009, and had the highest inflation rate in Latin America at 30.5%. President Hugo Chávez expressed optimism that Venezuela would emerge from recession despite International Monetary Fund (IMF) forecasts that Venezuela would be the only country in the region to remain in recession that year. The IMF categorized the economic recovery of Venezuela as "delayed and weak" in comparison with other countries in the region. Following Chávez's death in early 2013, the country's economy continued to fall into an even greater recession.

The annual inflation rate for consumer prices has increased by hundreds and thousands of percentage points during the crisis. Inflation rates remained high during Chávez's presidency. By 2010, inflation had removed any advancement of wage increases. By 2014, it was the highest in the world at 69%. By 2016, the media reported that Venezuela was suffering an economic collapse. The IMF estimated a 500% inflation rate and a 10% contraction in GDP.

== History ==
=== Maduro administration ===
In November 2016, Venezuela entered a period of hyperinflation. In December 2016, monthly inflation exceeded 50% for the 30th consecutive day, meaning the economy was officially experiencing hyperinflation, making Venezuela the 57th country to be added to the Hanke-Krus World Hyperinflation Table.

The inflation rate reached 4,000% in 2017. The same year, a trend began in Venezuela in which gold farming in cybergames, such as RuneScape, became an acquirable way to obtain hard currency. In many cases, they made more money than salaried workers in Venezuela, despite earning just a few dollars per day. During the Christmas season in 2017, some shops no longer used price tags; since prices inflated so quickly, customers were required to ask staff how much each item was. In early 2018, the Venezuelan government "essentially stopped" producing inflation estimates.

In May 2019, the BCV released economic data for the first time since 2015. It reported that the inflation rate was 274% in 2016, 863% in 2017, and 130,060% in 2018. The new report suggested a contraction of the economy by more than half in five years, described by the Financial Times as "one of the biggest contractions in Latin American history". According to undisclosed sources from Reuters, the release of this data was due to pressure from China, an ally of Nicolás Maduro. One of the sources claimed that this disclosure might bring Venezuela into compliance with the IMF, making it harder to support Juan Guaidó during the presidential crisis. At the time, the IMF was not able to support the validity of the data as they had not been able to contact the authorities.

=== 2018 inflation estimate ===
In 2018, the IMF estimated that Venezuela's inflation rate would reach 1,000,000% by the end of the year. This forecast was criticized by economist Steve Hanke, who claimed that the IMF had released a "bogus forecast" because "no one has ever been able to accurately forecast the course or the duration of an episode of hyperinflation. But that has not stopped the IMF from offering inflation forecasts for Venezuela that have proven to be wildly inaccurate". According to Hanke, Venezuela's inflation rate on 31 July 2018 was 33,151%, suggesting that "Venezuela is now experiencing the 23rd most severe episode of hyperinflation in history."

The IMF reported that the inflation rate for 2018 reached 929,790%, slightly below the original 1,000,000% estimate.

=== 2019 inflation estimate ===
In October 2018, the IMF estimated that the inflation rate would reach 10,000,000% by the end of 2019, which was again mentioned in its April 2019 World Economic Outlook report.

=== 2021 inflation estimate ===
In December 2021, economists and the Central Bank of Venezuela announced that Venezuela would reach in the first quarter of 2022 more than 12 months with monthly inflation below 50% after more than four years of a hyperinflationary cycle, which would technically indicate its exit from hyperinflation, but its consequences remained by that date.

== Causes ==
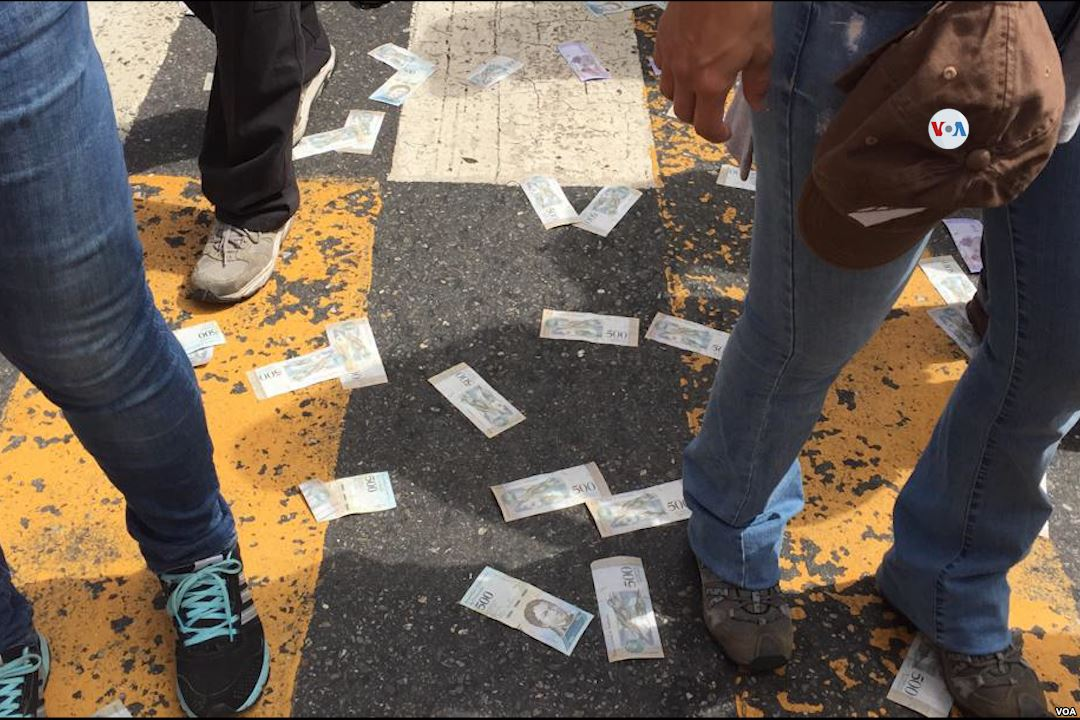
Venezuelan banknotes scattered in the street during the Venezuelan presidential crisis

A monetarist view is that a general increase in the prices of things is less a commentary on the worth of those things than on the worth of the money. This has objective and subjective components:

- Objectively, that the money has no firm basis to give it a value.
- Subjectively, that the people holding the money lack confidence in its ability to retain its value.

According to experts, Venezuela's economy began to experience hyperinflation during the first year of Nicolás Maduro's presidency. Potential causes of the hyperinflation include heavy money-printing and deficit spending. In April 2013, the month Maduro took office, the annual inflation rate was 29.4%, only 0.1% less than the rate in 1999 when Hugo Chávez took office. By April 2014, the annual inflation rate was 61.5%. In early 2014, the BCV did not release statistics for the first time in its history, with Forbes reporting that it was a possible way to manipulate the image of economy. In April 2014, the IMF stated that economic activity in Venezuela was uncertain but may continue to slow, and that "loose macroeconomic policies have generated high inflation and a drain on official foreign exchange reserves". The IMF suggested that "more significant policy changes are needed to stave off a disorderly adjustment". According to economist Steve Hanke, Venezuela's current economy, as of March 2014, had an inflation rate hovering above 300%, an official inflation rate around 60%, and a product scarcity index rising above 25% of goods. The Venezuelan government did not report inflation data for September and October 2014.

The growth in the BCV's money supply accelerated during the beginning of Maduro's presidency, which increased price inflation in the country. The money supply of the bolívar fuerte in Venezuela increased 64% in 2014, three times faster than any other economy observed by Bloomberg News at the time. Due to the rapidly decreasing value of the bolívar fuerte, Venezuelans jokingly called it "bolívar muerto" ("dead bolívar").

Maduro has blamed capitalist speculation for driving high inflation rates and creating widespread shortages of basic necessities. He has said he is fighting an "economic war", referring to newly enacted economic measures as "economic offensives" against political opponents, who, according to Maduro and his loyalists, are behind an international economic conspiracy. Maduro has been criticized for concentrating on public opinion instead of tending to practical issues that have been warned by economists, or creating solutions to improve Venezuela's economic prospects.

=== Devaluation of the bolívar ===
After the Chávez administration established strict currency controls in 2003, there have been a series of five currency devaluations, disrupting the economy. On 8 January 2010, the government changed the official fixed exchange rate from 2.15 bolívares fuertes (Bs.F) to 2.60 bolívares (for imported healthcare goods and certain foods) and 4.30 bolívares (for imported cars, petrochemicals, and electronics). On 4 January 2011, the fixed exchange rate became 4.30 bolívares per US$1.00 for both sides of the economy. On 13 February 2013, the bolívar was devalued to 6.30 bolívares per USD in an attempt to counter budget deficits. The black (or parallel) market value of the bolívar fuerte and the bolívar soberano has been significantly lower than the fixed exchange rate and other rates set by the Venezuelan government (SICAD, SIMADI, DICOM). In November 2013, it was almost one-tenth that of the official fixed exchange rate of 6.3 bolívares per U.S. dollar. On 18 February 2016, President Maduro used his newly granted economic powers to devalue the official exchange rate of the bolívar fuerte from 6.3 Bs.F per USD to 10 Bs.F per USD.

In September 2014, the unofficial exchange rate for the bolívar fuerte in Cúcuta, Colombia reached 100 Bs.F per USD. In May 2015, the bolívar fuerte lost 25% of its value in a week; the unofficial exchange rate was at 300 Bs.F per USD on 14 May and reached 400 Bs.F per USD on 21 May. In July 2015, the bolívar fuerte again dropped sharply, reaching 500 Bs.F per USD on 3 July and 600 Bs.F per USD on 9 July. By February 2016, the unofficial rate reached 1,000 Bs.F per USD. In November 2016, the bolívar fuerte saw its largest-ever monthly loss of value; the exchange rate reached 2,000 Bs.F per USD on 21 November 2016 and nearly 3,000 Bs.F per USD only days after. On 29 November 2016, the exchange rate surpassed 3,000 Bs.F per USD. In the month preceding 28 November 2016, the bolívar fuerte lost over 60% of its value.

On 26 January 2018, the government retired the protected and subsidized 10 Bs.F per USD exchange rate that was highly overvalued following rampant inflation. On 5 February 2018, the BCV announced a 99.6% [sic] devaluation, with the exchange rate going to 25,000 Bs.F per USD. This made the bolívar fuerte the second least-valued circulating currency in the world based on the official exchange rate, behind only the Iranian rial. Between September 2017 and August 2018, according to the informal exchange rate, the bolívar fuerte was the least-valued circulating currency in the world. The official exchange rate stood at 248,832 Bs.F per USD as of 10 August 2018, making it the least valued circulating currency in the world based on official exchange rates.

In June 2018, the government authorized a new exchange rate for buying, but not selling currency. On 13 August 2018, the rate was 4,010,000 Bs.F per USD according to ZOOM Remesas.

=== Minimum wage ===
The minimum wage in Venezuela dropped significantly in dollar terms during Maduro's presidency. It decreased from about $360 per month in 2012 to $31 per month in March 2015 based on the weakest legal exchange rate. On the Venezuelan currency black market, the minimum wage was only $20 per month.

In April 2014, President Maduro raised the minimum wage by 30%, hoping to improve citizens' purchasing power. According to El Nuevo Herald, most economists said that the measure would only help temporarily, due to the official inflation rate being over 59%, and the wage increase would only make things more difficult for companies, since they already faced a shortage of currency. In January 2015, the government announced that the minimum wage would be raised by 15%. On 1 May 2015, Maduro announced that the minimum wage would increase by 30%, including 20% in May, and 10% in July. The newly announced minimum wage was about $30 per month at the black market rate.

In August 2018, following the release of a new currency, the minimum wage was raised from 392,646 Bs.F to 180 million Bs.F (equivalent to 1,800 bolívares soberanos, or Bs.S) per month. Sales tax was increased from 12% to 16%. The new wage was estimated to be around $30 per month at the black market rate. It became effective on 1 September 2018. The minimum wage was further increased to 4,500 Bs.S ($9.50) a month in November 2018 and then 18,000 Bs.S ($6.52) a month in January 2019, a 300% total increase.

By early April 2019, the 18,000 Bs.S monthly minimum wage was the equivalent of $5.50 – less than the price of a McDonald's Happy Meal. Ecoanalitica estimated that prices jumped by 465% in the first two and a half months of 2019. In March 2019, The Wall Street Journal stated that the "main cause of hyperinflation is the central bank printing money to fund gaping public spending deficits", reporting that a teacher could only buy a dozen eggs and two pounds of cheese with a month's wages.

On 27 April 2019, Maduro increased the minimum wage from 18,000 Bs.S ($3.46) to 40,000 Bs.S ($7.69), according to a presidential decree. In addition, Maduro also announced the resumption of food vouchers worth 25,000 Bs.S ($4.80). The new wages became effective on 1 May 2019. According to a local NGO, the new minimum wage covers only one tenth of the cost of basic food products. The wage only allowed Venezuelans to buy about four kilograms of beef or two McDonald's Happy Meals per month. By mid-August 2019, further inflation of the bolívar soberano had decreased the minimum wage by 65% from $8 a month to $2.80 a month and it had decreased further to $2 a month by late August.

=== Government spending ===
In 2014, El Nuevo Herald reported that due a lack of money, SEBIN had decreased its work of monitoring of "potential external threats" and asked for Cuban intelligence agents to return to Venezuela.

== Inflation rate ==
=== BCV estimates ===
Under President Maduro, the inflation rate has been increasing at its highest levels, with the BCV estimating that inflation was at 56% in 2013, 69% in 2014 (highest in the world), and 181% in 2015 (highest in the world and the country's history). In 2016, Venezuela officially entered hyperinflation. The inflation rate reached 274% in 2016, 863% in 2017, 130,060% in 2018 and 9,586% in 2019. Since 2016, the overall inflation rate has increased to 53,798,500%.

Year	Inflation (%)
2013	56
2014	69
2015	181
2016*	274
2017*	863
2018*	130,060
2019	9,586
2020 (May)	2,296
2020	2,963
2021	687
2022	234
2023	189.8

(*) Data was unpublished between 2016 and 2018, finally revealed in 2019.

=== National Assembly estimates ===
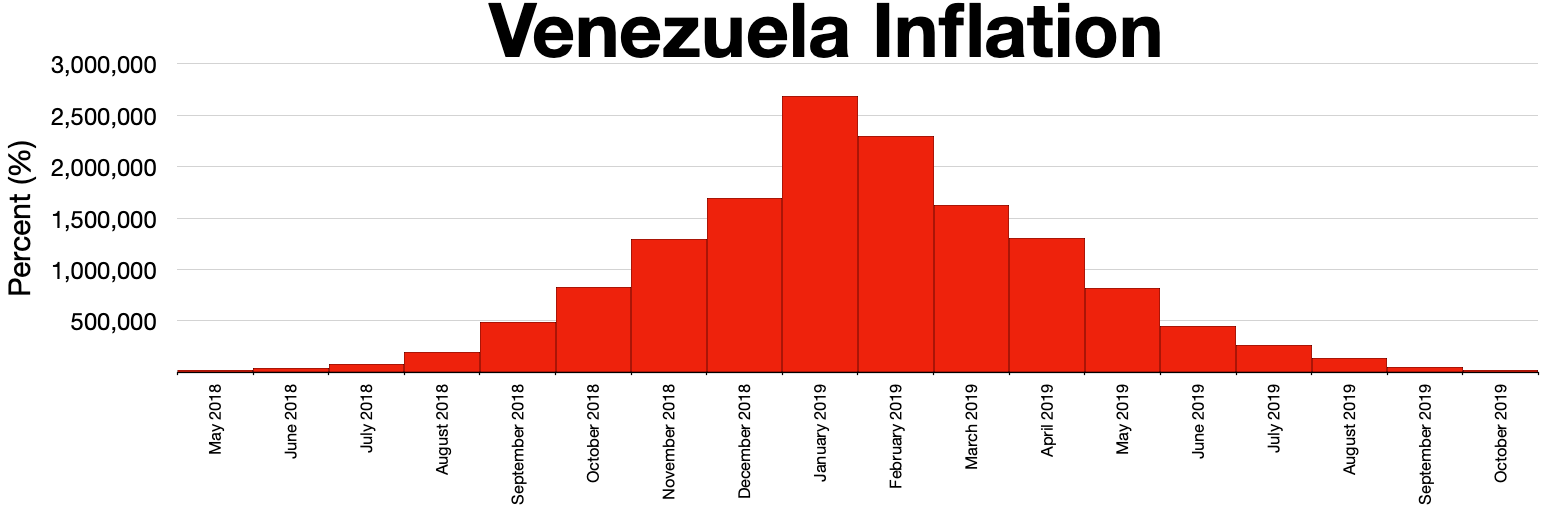
Venezuela hyperinflation May 2018 - October 2019

Since 2017, the opposition-led National Assembly has been estimating the inflation rate after the BCV stopped publishing inflation rates between 2015 and 2019. In May 2019, Venezuela's annual inflation rate dropped below 1,000,000% for the first time since 2018, with the BCV restricting the domestic money supply.

Date		Inflation (%)	
Year	Month	Yearly	Monthly
2017	January	19	19
2017	February	42	20
2017	March	66	16
2017	April	93	17
2017	May	128	18
2017	June	177	21
2017	July	249	26
2017	August	367	34
2017	September	536	36
2017	October	826	46
2017	November	1,351	57
2017	December	2,616	85
2018	January	4,068	84
2018	February	6,147	80
2018	March	8,877	67
2018	April	13,779	80
2018	May	24,571	110
2018	June	46,305	128
2018	July	82,766	125
2018	August	200,005	223
2018	September	488,865	233
2018	October	833,997	148
2018	November	1,299,742	144
2018	December	1,698,488	142
2019	January	2,688,670	192
2019	February	2,295,981	54
2019	March	1,623,656	18
2019	April	1,304,494	45
2019	May	815,194	31
2019	June	445,482	25
2019	July	264,873	34
2019	August	135,379	65
2019	September	50,100	24
2019	October	24,300	21
2019	November	13,500	36
2019	December	7,370	33
2020	January	4,140	65
2020	February	3,276	22
2020	March	3,365	21
2020	April	4,210	80
2020	May	3,684	15
2020	June	3,524	20
2020	July	4,099	55
2020	August	3,078	25
2020	September	3,246	30.
2020	October	3,332	23.8
2020	November	4,087	65.7
2020	December	3,713	21.2

(*) Formula applied to the Month Accumulated: Current Month Accumulated = {(Previous Month Accumulated + 100) * (1 + [Percentage Month Active / 100]) – 100}

=== IMF estimates ===
In its World Economic Outlook report, the IMF has provided inflation rate estimates between 1998 and 2019. In 2018, the annual inflation rate reached 929,790% and was expected to reach 10,000,000% by the end of 2019. According to the October 2019 World Economic Outlook report, Venezuela's inflation rate of 500,000 was the highest in the world. In comparison, in Latin America, Argentina had an inflation rate then of 43.7%.

Year	Inflation (%)	Year	Inflation (%)
1998	36	2010	28
1999	24	2011	26
2000	16	2012	21
2001	13	2013	40
2002	22	2014	62
2003	31	2015	121
2004	22	2016	254
2005	16	2017	438
2006	14	2018	65,370
2007	19	2019	19,910
2008	31	2020	2,360
2009	29	2021	1,590

=== Café Con Leche and Misery Indexes ===
Bloomberg's Café Con Leche Index calculated the price of a cup of coffee to have increased 718% in the 12 weeks before 18 January 2018, an annualized inflation rate of 448,000%.

Venezuela's misery rate was forecasted to reach 8,000,000% in 2019, making it the world's most miserable economy. The country topped Bloomberg's Misery Index for the fifth consecutive year since 2013.

== Exchange rate history ==
Under Venezuelan law, it is illegal to publish unofficial exchange rates, including the "parallel exchange rate", within Venezuela. One popular website that has been publishing parallel exchange rates since 2010 is DolarToday, which has also been critical of the Maduro and Delcy Rodriguez governments. These tables and graphs show the exchange rate history of both the bolívar fuerte and bolívar soberano compared to the United States dollar (USD) between 2012 and 2021.

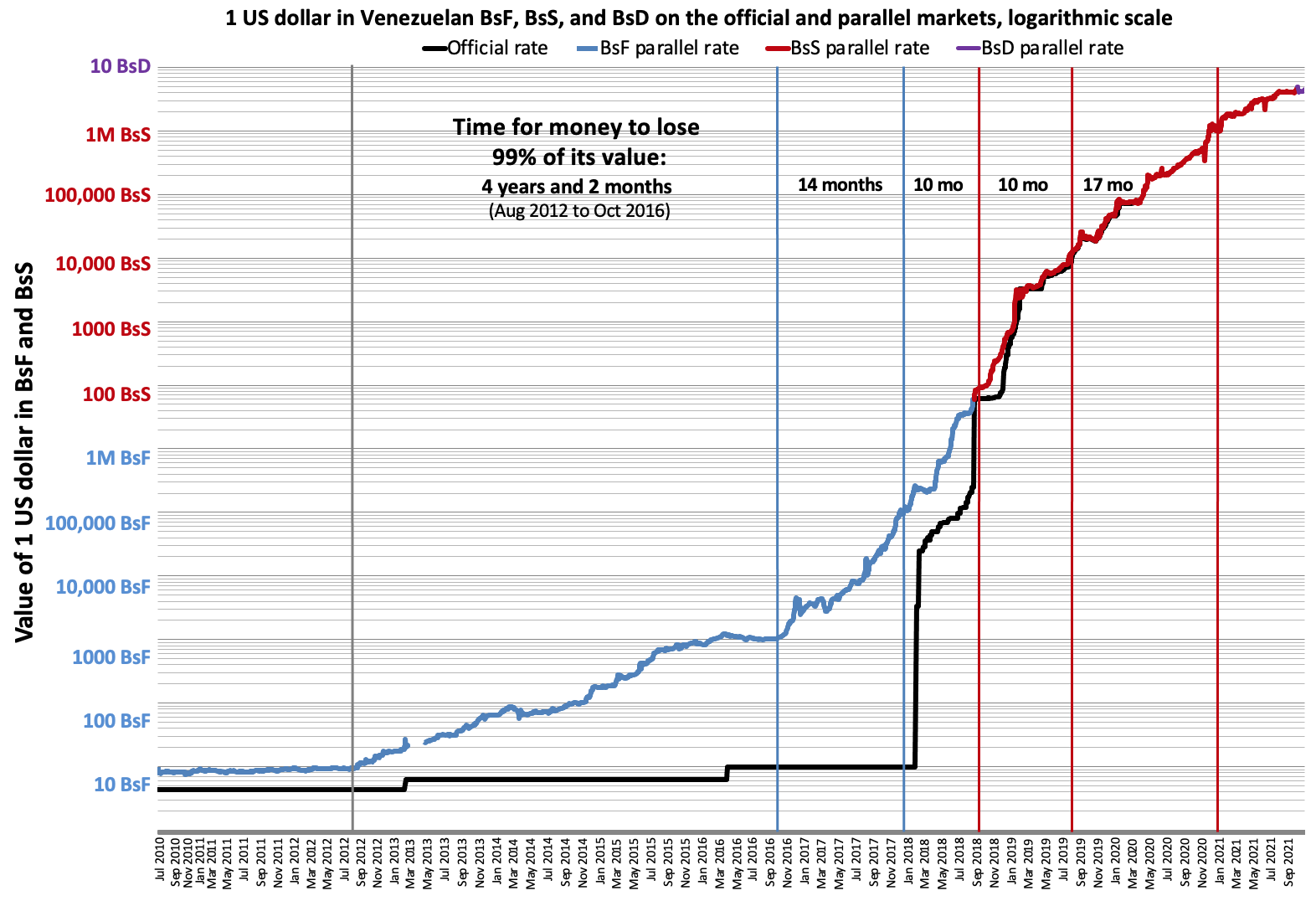
The value of one U.S. dollar in Venezuelan bolívares fuertes (before 20 August 2018) and bolívares soberanos on the parallel (or black) market through time. Blue and red vertical lines represent each time the currency has lost 99% of its remaining value, which has happened five times since 2012. This graph shows that as of March 2020, the currency is worth 750 million times less than it was worth in August 2012. Since the beginning of the presidential crisis in Venezuela in January 2019, the curve has been less steep than previously, meaning that the rate at which the value is lost, inflation, has slowed down.

Bolívar fuerte (Bs.F)
1 Bs.F = 1,000 Bs.
Bolívar soberano (Bs.S)
1 Bs.S = 100,000 Bs.F

Month	Exchange rate
August 2012	10
February 2013	20
June 2013	30
September 2013	40
October 2013	50
November 2013	60
January 2014	70
February 2014	80
August 2014	90
September 2014	100
February 2015	200
May 2015	300–400
July 2015	500–600
September 2015	700–800
December 2015	900
February 2016	1,000
October 2016	1,500
November 2016	2,000–4,000

Month	Exchange rate
May 2017	5,000–6,000
June 2017	7,000–8,000
July 2017	8,000–11,000
August 2017	11,000–18,000
September 2017	18,000–29,000
October 2017	29,000–41,000
November 2017	41,000–97,000
December 2017	103,000–111,000
January 2018	111,000–236,000
February 2018	214,000–228,000
March 2018	213,000–236,000
April 2018	236,000–621,000
May 2018	621,000–1.3 million
June 2018	1.4–3.4 million
July 2018	3.4–3.6 million
August 2018	3.6–5.9 million

Month	Exchange rate
August 2018	60–90
September 2018	90–100
October 2018	100–240
November 2018	240–410
December 2018	410–730
January 2019	730–2,720
February 2019	2,580–3,700
March 2019	3,680–3,720
April 2019	3,710–6,120
May 2019	6,120–6,350
June 2019	6,350–7,880
July 2019	7,840–12,520
August 2019	13,010–25,950
September 2019	25,950–26,000
November 2019	27,000–41,700
December 2019	43,030–54,702
January 2020	54,702–83,273
February 2020	75,015–77,142

Month	Exchange rate
March 2020	84,723–87,396
April 2020	89,168–200,058
July 2020	205,230–268,022
August 2020	268,022–345,123
September 2020	346,053–444,823
October 2020	449,043–458,032
November 2020	524,000–950,000
December 2020	940,000–1.2 million
January 2021	1.0–1.8 million
February 2021	1.7–1.9 million
March 2021	1.8–2.1 million
April 2021	2.2–2.9 million
May 2021	2.8–3.2 million
June 2021	3.1–3.3 million
July 2021	3.3–4.1 million
August 2021	4.1–4.2 million

== Effects ==
=== Unemployment ===
Unemployment has been increasing in the years of hyperinflation with the 2019 rate seen as Venezuela's highest since the end of the Bosnian War in 1995 and the biggest contraction since 2014 start of Libyan Civil War, according to the International Monetary Fund (IMF). In January 2016, the unemployment rate was 18.1% and the economy was the worst in the world according to the misery index. Venezuela has not reported official unemployment figures since April 2016, when the rate was at 7.3%.

In October 2019, the unemployment rate reached 35%. By the end of the year, it was estimated that it would increase to 39% to 40%, and 60% of the economically active population belongs to the informal sector, which influences the low salary that has caused many young people to emigrate to other countries.

=== Refugee and migration crisis ===
Emigration in Venezuela existed in a moderate way under Maduro's predecessor Hugo Chávez. By 2015, almost 30% of the population had fled the country due to inflation, and it is at that time the country entered hyperinflation. The Organization of American States (OAS) and UNHCR has been classified as one of the largest emigrations in the history of the Western hemisphere.

According to the UNHCR, the deterioration of the political, economic and human rights situation in Venezuela continues, making international support necessary. The latest report discloses that 4.8 million Venezuelans are registered as refugees and migrants.

== Solutions and adaptations ==
=== Change of inflation rate calculations ===
In September 2014, the BCV reportedly changed its inflation rate calculation methods from the more common Laspeyres price index to the Fisher price index. This changed the government's June inflation data from 5.7% to 4.4%, July's 5.5% rate to 4.1%, and August's 4.3% to 3.9%.< It was also stated in the BCV's August report that it was an "economic war that hindered the normal course of production activities and distribution of essential goods demanded by the Venezuelan people".

=== Bolívar fuerte ===
Venezuelans lining up at the Banco de Venezuela branch in Chacao to deposit the 100 Bs.F note after President Maduro withdrew it from circulation.

On 7 March 2007, the Chávez administration announced that the bolívar would be revalued at a ratio of 1,000 to 1 on 1 January 2008, and renamed it the bolívar fuerte in an effort to facilitate the ease of transaction and accounting, responding to double-digit inflation. The new name is literally translated as "strong bolívar". It is also a reference to the peso fuerte, an old coin worth 10 Spanish reales. The official exchange rate was restricted to individuals by CADIVI, which imposes an annual limit on the amount available for travel.

==== Introduction of higher denomination banknotes ====
Denominations of 2 and 5 Bs.F banknotes were no longer found in circulation due to the inflation in 2015, but remained legal tender. By early December 2016, the 100 Bs.F note—Venezuela's largest denomination of currency—was only worth about US$0.23 on the black market. On 7 December 2016, a new series of notes (recolors of previous notes) in denominations of 500, 1,000, 2,000, 5,000, 10,000, and 20,000 Bs.F were unveiled to the public.

On 3 November 2017, President Maduro unveiled a 100,000 Bs.F note, which was similar to the 2007-series 100 Bs.F note and the 2016-series 20,000 Bs.F note, but with the denomination spelled out in full instead of adding an additional three zeros after 100. This denomination was worth US$2.42 through black market exchange rates at the time of its release. By July 2018, increasing hyperinflation had reduced its value by 99.9% to less than US$0.01 overall.

On 6 March 2021, the government issued three new bills, worth Bs.S 200,000, 500,000, and 1,000,000. The last is worth US$0.52.

==== Withdrawal of the 100 Bs.F banknote ====
"I have given the orders to close all land, maritime and air possibilities so those bills taken out can’t be returned and they’re stuck with their fraud abroad. There has been a scam and smuggling of 100 Bs.F bills on the border with Colombia and we have tried the diplomatic way to deal with this problem with Colombia’s government; there are huge mafias. On the border with Colombia all the exchange houses are in the hands of mafias linked to the right-wing. I have taken the decision to close the border with Colombia for 72 hours."

— President Nicolás Maduro announcing the withdrawal of the 100 Bs.F banknotes within for 72 hours. (11 December 2016)

On 11 December 2016, President Maduro, who had been ruling by decree, wrote into law that 100 Bs.F notes would be pulled from circulation within 72 hours due to "mafias" allegedly storing them to drive inflation. With more than 6 billion 100 Bs.F notes issued consisting of 46% of Venezuela's issued currency, Maduro allowed for Venezuelans to exchange all 100 Bs.F notes for 100 Bs.F coins or higher denomination banknotes, while also blocking international travel to prevent the return of notes that were supposedly stockpiled. The government justified the move by claiming that the US was working with crime syndicates to move Venezuelan banknotes to warehouses in Europe to cause the fall of the government, and that the government was thwarting this threat by withdrawing the notes from circulation. The government of India took a similar action in November 2016, by withdrawing the 500 and 1000 rupee notes from cirulation, in hopes of curtailing the shadow economy and reducing the use of illicit and counterfeit cash to fund illegal activity and terrorism.

On 14 February 2017, Paraguayan authorities uncovered a 30-tonne (66,000 lb) stash of 50 and 100 Bs.F banknotes totaling 1.5 billion Bs.F on its Brazilian border that had not yet been circulated. According to a US Department of Defense adviser linked to The Pentagon, the 1.5 billion Bs.F was printed by Venezuela and destined for Bolivia, since, unlike the implied exchange rate of thousands of Bs.F per USD, the exchange rate was approximately 10 Bs.F per USD, making the value of the stash 419 times stronger, from US$358,000 to US$150 million. The adviser further stated that the Venezuelan government tried to send the newly printed notes to be exchanged by the Bolivian government, so Bolivia could pay 20% of its debt to Venezuela, and also so Venezuela could use the US dollars for its own disposal and other purposes.

=== Petro cryptocurrency ===
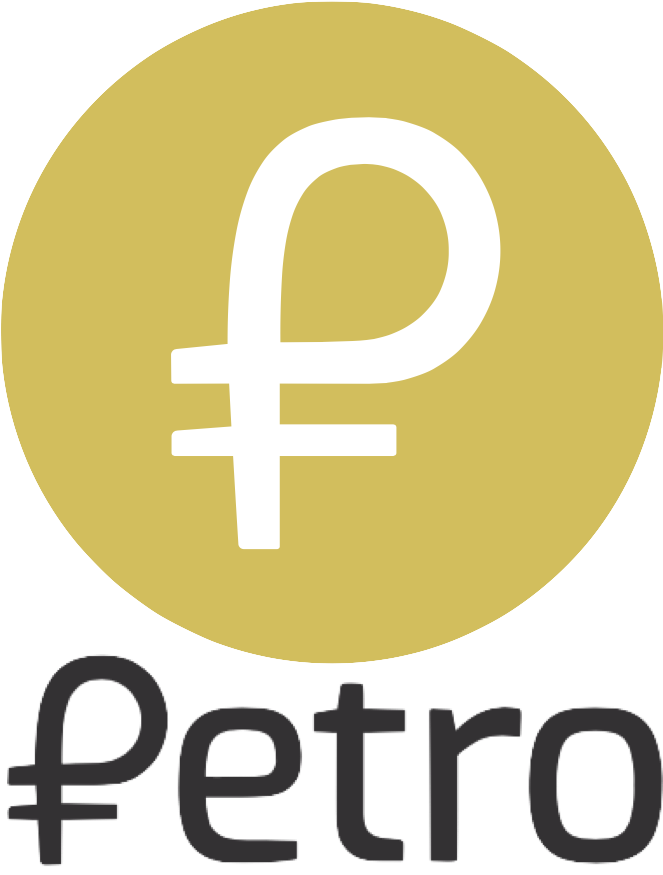
Petro Logo

In December 2017, Maduro announced that Venezuela would introduce a state cryptocurrency called the 'Petro' in an attempt to shore up its struggling economy. This new cryptocurrency would be backed by Venezuela's reserves of oil, gasoline, gold, and diamonds. Maduro stated that the Petro would allow Venezuela to "advance in issues of monetary sovereignty", and that it would make "new forms of international financing" available to the country. Opposition leaders, however, expressed doubt due to Venezuela's economic turmoil, pointing to the falling value of the Venezuelan bolívar, its fiat currency, and $140 billion in foreign debt.

In January 2018, as a response to the petro, Venezuela's National Assembly, headed by the opposition Democratic Unity Roundtable, declared the petro to be an illegal debt issuance by a government desperate for cash, and said it would not recognize it. On the same month, Maduro announced that Venezuela would issue 100 million tokens of the petro, which would put the value of the entire issuance at just over $6 billion. It also established a cryptocurrency government advisory group called VIBE to act as "an institutional, political and legal base" from which to launch the petro.

In March 2018, US President Donald Trump signed an executive order prohibiting transactions in any Venezuelan government-issued cryptocurrency by any US citizen or any person within the US, effective on 19 March, after claiming that the cryptocurrency was designed to obfuscate US sanctions and access international financing.

In August 2018, the bolívar soberano had a fixed exchange rate of 3,600 Bs.S per Petro. The Petro was supposedly tied to the price of a barrel of oil (about US$60 in August 2018). As of late-August 2018, there is no evidence that the Petro is being traded. The Petro is regarded by many as a scam.

=== Redenomination ===
==== Bolívar soberano ====
Redenomination of the bolívar, bolívar fuerte, and bolívar soberano
Value in Bs.S. (2018–)	Value in Bs.F (2008–18)	Value in Bs. (1879–2008)
No value	0.01, 0.05, 0.10; 0.125, 0.25, 0.50; 1, 2, 5; 10, 20, 50; 100, and 500	10, 50, 100; 125, 250, 500; 1,000, 2,000, 5,000; 10,000, 20,000, 50,000; 100,000, and 500,000
0.01	1,000	1,000,000
0.02	2,000	2,000,000
0.05	5,000	5,000,000
0.10	10,000	10,000,000
0.20	20,000	20,000,000
0.50	50,000	50,000,000
1	100,000	100,000,000
2	200,000	200,000,000
5	500,000	500,000,000
10	1,000,000	1 billion
20	2,000,000	2 billion
50	5,000,000	5 billion
100	10,000,000	10 billion
200	20,000,000	20 billion
500	50,000,000	50 billion
10,000	1 billion	1 trillion
20,000	2 billion	2 trillion
50,000	5 billion	5 trillion

President Nicolás Maduro announcing the redenomination of the Venezuelan bolívar on 17 August 2018.

On 22 March 2018, Maduro announced a new monetary reform, in which the bolívar would once again be revalued at a ratio of 1 to 1,000, making the new bolívar equal to one million pre-2008 bolívares. The currency was renamed as the bolívar soberano ("sovereign bolívar"). New coins in denominations of 50 céntimos and 1 Bs.S, as well as new banknotes in denominations of 2, 5, 10, 20, 50, 100, 200, and 500 Bs.S, were introduced. The change was to be made effective on 4 June 2018.

Starting on 1 May 2018, prices were expressed in both bolívares and bolívares soberanos at the original rate of 1,000 to 1. (For example, one kilogram of pasta was shown with prices of 695,000 Bs.F and 695 Bs.S) Prices expressed in the new currency were rounded to the nearest 50 céntimos, as this was expected to be the lowest denomination in circulation at launch. The rounding created difficulties, because some items and sales quantities were priced significantly less than 0.50 Bs.S; for example, 1 litre (0.26 US gal) of gasoline and a Caracas Metro ticket typically cost 0.06 Bs.S and 0.04 Bs.S, respectively.

The launch of the bolívar soberano was originally scheduled for 4 June 2018. Maduro delayed the launch date, quoting Aristides Maza: "the period established to carry out the conversion is not enough". The revaluation was rescheduled to 20 August 2018, and the rate changed to 100,000 to 1, with prices being required to be expressed at the new rate starting 1 August 2018.

On 20 August 2018, the Maduro administration launched the bolívar soberano, with 1 Bs.S worth 100,000 Bs.F. New coins in denominations of 50 céntimos and 1 Bs.S, as well as new banknotes in denominations of 2, 5, 10, 20, 50, 100, 200, and 500 Bs.S, were introduced. Under the country's official fixed exchange rate to the US dollar, the new currency was devalued by roughly 95% compared to the old bolívar fuerte. The day was declared a bank holiday to allow banks to adjust to the new currency. Initially, the bolívar soberano was to be run alongside the bolívar fuerte during a transition period. However, from the start of the transition (20 August), bolívar fuerte notes of 500 or less could not be used - only deposited at banks. Maduro also announced that after the currency redenomination on 20 August, old banknotes with a face value of 1,000 Bs.F or higher would circulate in parallel with bolívar soberano notes and would continue to be used for a limited time, and any banknotes with a face value below 1,000 Bs.F would be withdrawn from circulation and cease to be legal tender.

Immediately following the introduction of the bolívar soberano, the inflation rate increased from 61,463% on 21 August to 65,320% on 22 August. By 24 August 2018, the introduction of the bolívar soberano had not prevented hyperinflation. According to economist Steve Hanke, between 18 August and 21 August 2018, the inflation rate increased from 48,760% to 65,320%. On 22 August, DolarToday estimated that the free-market exchange rate was 71.2 Bs.S per USD. AirTM's reported exchange rate was 75.6 Bs.S per USD.

According to DolarToday, the estimated exchange rate was 2700 Bs.S per USD in Venezuela's free market as of 21 January 2019. AirTM's exchange rate was 2200 Bs.S per USD.

===== Introduction of larger banknotes =====
By June 2019, further inflation of the bolívar soberano since redenomination had resulted in 10,000, 20,000, and 50,000 Bs.S banknotes entering circulation effective on 13 June. The BCV stated that the introduction of the new banknotes will "make the payment system more efficient and facilitate commercial transactions." The highest denomination banknote (Bs.S 50,000) was worth US$8 on the black market and was more than the monthly minimum wage of Bs.S 40,000.

On 14 June, the BCV estimated the official exchange rate to be 6,244 Bs.S per USD. DolarToday estimated the free market exchange rate to be 6,803 Bs.S per USD.

By mid-August 2019, the exchange rate reached an all-time high of 13,921 Bs.S per USD, while the euro was at 15,515 Bs.S per EUR. According to Venezuelan economist Luis Oliveros, the exchange rate experienced "a 30,000% increase" compared to the rate one year ago, 37 Bs.S per USD. By the end of the month, the parallel exchange rate reached nearly 23,000 Bs.S per USD. However, the exchange rate appreciated to about 20,000 Bs.S per USD by 10 October 2019

=== Informal dollarization ===
Following increased international sanctions throughout 2019, the Maduro government abandoned policies established by Chávez such as price and currency controls (imposed since 2003) which resulted in the country seeing a rebound from economic decline. According to a survey by economic consultant Econalítica, about 54% of transactions in Venezuelan during September 2019 were in US dollars. The number of transactions in dollars raised up to 86% in Maracaibo. The survey also found that almost all sales of electrical appliances are dollarized, as well as half of the sales of clothes, spare car parts and food.

In a November 2019 interview with Venezuelan journalist José Vicente Rangel, Nicolás Maduro described dollarization as an "escape valve" that helps the recovery of the country, the spread of productive forces in the country and the economy. However, Maduro said that the Venezuelan bolívar will still remain as the national currency.

Some Venezuelan banks began to issue debit cards in U.S. dollars on January 29, 2021.

== See also ==
- Hyperinflation in Brazil
- Hyperinflation in Zimbabwe
- International sanctions during the Venezuelan crisis
- Venezuelan bolívar
- Viernes Rojo
- Viernes Negro
