= Michel Goguikian =

Lebanese–Venezuelan financier, investor, and philanthropist

Michel J. Goguikian (Beirut, Lebanon) is a Lebanese-Venezuelan-Spanish banker, investor, and philanthropist. He served as president of Banco de Venezuela from 1996 to 2009 and promoted the founding of Universia in Venezuela in 2001. He is chairman and majority shareholder of Bancrecer, a Venezuelan microfinance bank, founder of SquareOne Capital, a United States-based venture capital firm, and a board member of Fintonic, a leading Spanish digital fintech company.

== Early life and education ==
Michel Goguikian was born in Lebanon into a diplomatic family. His father, Ambassador Jean Goguikian, Lebanon's first ambassador of Armenian origin, held several diplomatic posts, including at the United Nations where he participated, among others, in the first International Symposium on Industrial Development held in Athena in 1967. Michel earned an M.B.A. from the University of Texas in 1981. He has attended finance and management programs for senior executives at the University of Pennsylvania Wharton School, and at the Harvard Business School.

== Career ==
Citibank

Goguikian began his career with Citibank in the Middle East. In the 1980s, he moved to the Investment Banking division in New York, where he led the asset-backed structured finance unit, contributing to Latin American debt recovery strategies after the regional debt crisis.

Santander Group

In the 1990s, he joined the Santander Group, overseeing investment banking in South America. He was involved in the group's expansion across Brazil, Argentina, Colombia, Venezuela, and Peru.

Banco de Venezuela

Goguikian was involved in Santander's acquisition of Banco de Venezuela in 1996 and served as its chairman and CEO until 2009. He oversaw its sale to the Venezuelan government, the country's largest banking M&A transaction. In 2000, he also led the acquisition and merger of Banco Caracas.

Banco Santander Colombia

He later served as Chairman of Banco Santander Colombia, managing its sale in 2011 to the Chilean Group CorpBanca.

Bancrecer and Republic International Bank

Since 2009, he is the controlling shareholder of Bancrecer, a microfinance bank in Venezuela. He also chaired Republic International Bank (Curaçao) until its divestiture in May 2025.

Venture Capital

In 2018, Goguikian founded SquareOne Capital, a venture capital firm with investments in Robinhood, Coinbase, Stripe, xAI, and Anthropic, among others. In 2023, SquareOne Capital, through its European subsidiary, acquired a majority stake in Fintonic, a free financial management application that centralizes and analyzes personal finances and facilitates access to financial products. In 2024, Goguikian negotiated the sale of Ninety Nine Corporation.

== Personal life ==
In 2001, he spearheaded the founding of Universia Venezuela in 2001, an institution that, under the patronage of Grupo Santander, brings together and promotes a collaborative network between students, universities, and private companies to offer educational and employment opportunities in the country where it operates.

In 2008, he created the Goguikian Foundation, in honour of his father. This non-political, philanthropic, and non-profit organisation fosters the academic and professional growth of young Lebanese and Armenians through scholarships and job training. It also promotes doctoral research through the GTALKS outreach platform and recognises excellence in Arabic among young Lebanese and Armenian high school students with the annual Al Bayan Award. It established the Jean Goguikian Fund with several Lebanese universities to support Armenian-descent students. After the 2020 Beirut explosion, the foundation led a matched fundraising campaign to support affected hospitals and NGOs. Its current focus includes tech education and employment initiatives in Latin America.

== Arts and cultural leadership ==
Goguikian was a member of the board of directors of El Museo del Barrio in New York and is a member of the board of directors of the Friends of the Reina Sofía Museum Foundation in Madrid.
