= Nelson Merentes =

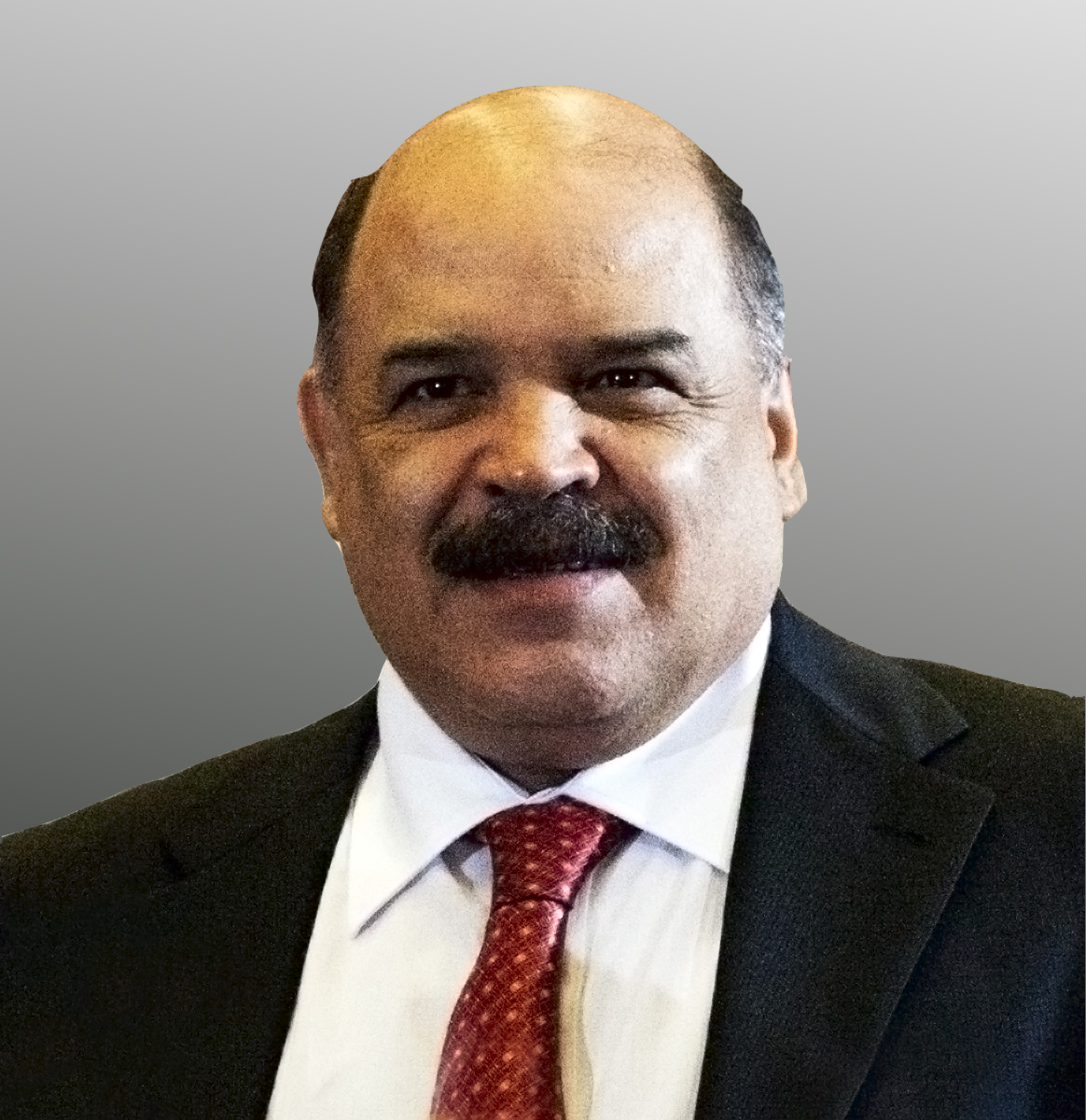

President of the Central Bank of Venezuela
- In office 2014–2017
- President: Nicolas Maduro
- Preceded by: Eudomar Tovar
- Succeeded by: Ricardo Sanguino
- In office 2009–2013
- President: Hugo Chávez
- Preceded by: Gastón Parra Luzardo
- Succeeded by: Edmée Betancourt

Minister of Finance of Venezuela
- In office 2004–2007
- President: Hugo Chávez
- Preceded by: Tobías Nóbrega
- Succeeded by: Rodrigo Cabezas

Minister of Science and Technology of Venezuela
- In office 2002–2003
- President: Hugo Chávez
- Preceded by: Carlos Genatios
- Succeeded by: Marlene Yadira Córdova

Minister of Finance of Venezuela
- In office 2001–2002
- President: Hugo Chávez
- Preceded by: José Alejandro Rojas
- Succeeded by: Francisco Usón

Legislator at the National Legislative Committee
- In office 2000–2000

Minister of Finance of Venezuela
- In office 2013–2014
- President: Nicolas Maduro
- Preceded by: Jorge Giordani
- Succeeded by: Rodolfo Clemente Marco Torres

Personal details
- Born: 6 May 1954 (age 72) Naiguatá, Vargas, Venezuela
- Party: PSUV
- Education: Central University of Venezuela
- Profession: Mathematician, politician
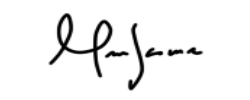
- Signature

Nelson José Merentes Díaz (born 6 May 1954) is a Venezuelan mathematician, researcher, and politician.

== Academic activity ==
In 1978 Merentes finished his bachelor's degree of Mathematics at Central University of Venezuela and continued his post graduate education taking courses on Economy and Finance, as well as in multifunction techniques for the study of economic problems, completing finally a doctorate in Mathematics with summa cum laude honors, at the Eötvös Loránd University of Budapest (Hungary) (1991).

Merentes developed most of his research and teaching at Central University of Venezuela where he participated as professor, representative and member of various councils and committees.

== Public office work ==
Merentes also worked extensively in public administration. From 2000 to 2001 he was the Economy and Finance subcommittee's chairman of the National Legislative Committee. He also worked for the Ministry of Finance as deputy minister of Regulation and Control (2000-2001). In 2001 he was appointed as Minister of Finance of Venezuela by President Hugo Chavez. He held that position until the following year, when he was designated as Science and Technology Minister. From that position he was called by President Chavez for the presidency of Social Development Bank (BANDES), a position he left to return to the Ministry of Finance in early 2004. During his second term, took place the creation of the FONDEN, Venezuela's National Development Fund. From April 2009 he became a president of the Central Bank of Venezuela until 2013.

In April 2013 is appointed as Venezuela's Minister of Finance by Nicolás Maduro. In January 2014, he was re-designated as president of the Central Bank of Venezuela.

== Sanctions ==
In 2017, Canada sanctioned Merentes and other Venezuelan officials under the Justice for Victims of Corrupt Foreign Officials Act, stating: "These individuals are responsible for, or complicit in, gross violations of internationally recognized human rights, have committed acts of significant corruption, or both."

== Published works ==
As a researcher Merentes has published more than 200 scientific papers, including some in specialized mathematical study journals. His field of study was mainly focused on the study of differential equations and Lipschitz continuity. some of his notable contributions include:

- On the Composition Operator in AC[a, b] (1991),
- On the Composition Operator in BV φ[a; b] (1991)
- On Functions of Bounded (p,k)-Variation (1992) (with S. Rivas and J. L. Sánchez)
- Characterization of Globally Lipschitzian Composition Operators in the Banach Space BV^{2}_{p} [a, b] (1992) (with J. Matkowski)
- Explicit Petree's function of interpolation of the spaces H _{p} ^{s} (1993)
- On the Composition Operator between RV_{p} [a, b] and BV [a, b] (1995) (with S. Rivas)
- Uniformly Continuous Set-valued Composition Operators in the Spaces of Functions of Bounded Variation in the Sense of Wiener (2010) (with A. Azócar, J. A. Guerrero and J. Matkowski)
- Locally Lipschitz Composition Operators in Spaces of Functions of Bounded Variation (2010) (with J. Appell y J.L. Sanchez)
- Measures of Noncompactness in the Study of Asymptotically Stable and Ultimately Nondecreasing Solutions of Integral Equations (2010) (with J. Appell y J. Banaś)
- Exact Controllability of Semilinear Stochastic Evolution Equation (2011) (with D. Barráez, H. Leiva and M. Narváez)
- Integral Representation of Functions of Bounded Second Φ-Variation in the Sense of Schramm (2011) (with J. Giménez and S. Rivas)
- Approximate Controllability of Semilinear Reaction Diffusion Equations (2012) (with H. Leiva and J. L. Sánchez)
- Uniformly Bounded Set-valued Composition Operators in the Spaces of Functions of Bounded Variation in the Sense of Schramm (2012) (with T. Ereú, J. L. Sánchez and M. Wróbel)
