= Ramón Lobo (economist) =

Venezuelan politician

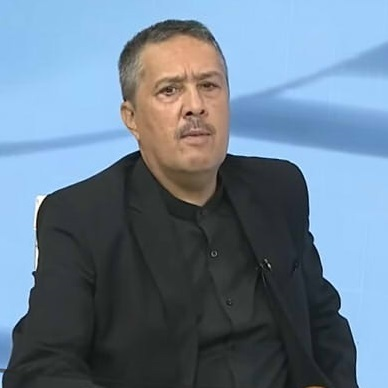
- Ramón Lobo in 2025

President of the Central Bank of Venezuela
- In office October 26, 2017 – June 19, 2018
- President: Nicolas Maduro
- Preceded by: Calixto Ortega Sánchez

Minister of Popular Power for the Economy and Finance
- In office January 4, 2017 – October 26, 2017
- President: Nicolas Maduro
- Preceded by: Rodolfo Medina del Río
- Succeeded by: Simón Zerpa

Deputy of the National Assembly
- In office January 5, 2011 – January 4, 2017

Personal details
- Born: Ramón Augusto Lobo Moreno; April 24, 1964 (age 62) La Azulita, Mérida, Venezuela
- Party: Fifth Republic Movement (MVR); United Socialist Party of Venezuela (PSUV)
- Education: University Fermín Toro
- Profession: Economist, politician, professor
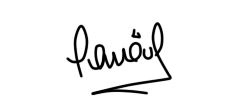
- Signature
- Website: Ramón Lobo – PSUV

Ramón Augusto Lobo Moreno (born April 24, 1967) is a Venezuelan politician, economist and professor who served as president of the Central Bank of Venezuela between 2017 and 2018. He was a deputy to the National Assembly representing Mérida state and Minister of Finance of Venezuela in 2017. As of December 2018, he currently serves as Minister Counselor and charge d'affaires of the Embassy of Venezuela in Riyadh, Saudi Arabia.

== Personal life ==
Lobo was born in La Azulita, Andrés Bello Municipality of Mérida State, on April 24, 1967. Eldest son of Ramón Lobo Albarrán and Silvina Moreno de Lobo. He is married to Carolina Marín de Lobo, whose union was born by his daughters Silvina Ariana and Oriana Carolina.

The path traveled by Ramón Lobo in terms of vocational training has been long and fruitful, he studied elementary school at the "Rafael María Torres" National School, continued secondary education at the Liceo Bolivarian Educational Unit "La Azulita" and then enters the University from Los Andes (ULA) where he obtains the Economist Degree. The concern for training as a more complete professional leads him to study a postgraduate degree at the Fermín Toro University where he acquires the Title of Magister Scientiarum in Business Management.

During his professional practice, he has worked as an assistant administrator and Budget analyst at the ULA School of Pharmacy. He was an instructor professor at the University Institute "Antonio José de Sucre" where he has taught the Chairs of Accounting, Economics and Financial Mathematics.

== Political career ==
Lobo served as Mayor of the Andrés Bello Municipality during two consecutive periods (2000–2008), where he acquires greater experience in public management and optimizes citizen participation in the exercise of municipal government. In the life of Ramón Lobo, political activity has been a permanent inspiration, the fight for equality and social justice led him to integrate the Youth and Communist Party of Venezuela, 1986/1996. It is an active part of the Movement June 24, 1987/1991. In the ULA he assumes the student leadership as a Member of the Student Center of the Faculty of Economic and Social Sciences by Option 89, 1989/1991. He has not abandoned his roots or his homeland to integrate the La Espuela Azulitense Community Movement, since 1991.

In the Fifth Republic Movement (MVR), he was a member and Finance Coordinator of the Andrés Bello Municipality between 1998 and 2007. Following the creation of the United Socialist Party of Venezuela (PSUV) he joined the "La Victoria de Bolívar" Battalion Spokesman in the Andrés Bello Municipality. It integrates the Territorial Patrol "Alí Primera" and the Sectorial of the Faculty of Pharmacy of the ULA. He was a State Spokesman of the PSUV Organizing Committee, Delegate of the PSUV for the Municipality Andrés Bello and State Spokesman before the First Extraordinary Congress of the PSUV.

Lobo was the deputy candidate for the National Assembly of Electoral Circuit No. 2 by decision of the PSUV bases, and was in the National Parliament by decision of the People in defense and deepening of the Socialist Revolution being elected by an average amount of 52% and 58% respectively during two periods from 2011 to 2016 and 2016–17.

On January 4, 2017, President Nicolás Maduro appointed as Minister of the Popular Power for Economy, Finance, Public Banking, Trade and Industry Wolf as part of his cabinet as part of the Agenda Ofensiva Carabobo.

On October 26, 2017, the National Constituent Assembly appointed Lobo as the next president of the Central Bank of Venezuela, even though the constitution of Venezuela and the Law on the Central Bank establishes that the ratification of the president of the Central Bank must be approved by the National Assembly majority opposition after being chosen by the president.

On December 10, 2018, President Nicolás Maduro designated Lobo as Minister Counselor and charge d'affairs of the Venezuelan Embassy in Saudi Arabia.
