= Mauricio García Araujo =

Venezuelan economist (1930–2012)

President of the Central Bank of Venezuela
- In office 1987–1989
- President: Jaime Lusinchi
- Preceded by: Hernán Anzola
- Succeeded by: Pedro Tinoco

Personal details
- Born: July 7, 1930 Maracaibo, Venezuela
- Died: February 13, 2012 (aged 81) Bonaire
- Spouse: Irene Giliberti de García Araujo
- Children: Luis Vicente García Giliberti, María de Lourdes García Giliberti, Irene del Carmen García Giliberti, Mauricio Andrés García Giliberti
- Education: Columbia University
- Profession: Economist
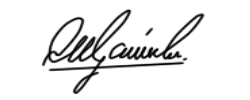
- Signature

Mauricio García Araujo (7 July 1930 – 19 December 2012) was a Venezuelan economist who worked in both the private and public sectors. He was the president of the Central Bank of Venezuela between 1987 and 1989 during the presidency of Jaime Lusinchi (1984-1989).

== Early life and education ==
García Araujo was born on 7 July 1930 in Maracaibo, Venezuela. In 1953, he obtained a bachelor's degree in economics and a master's in business administration, both from Columbia University.

== Public service ==
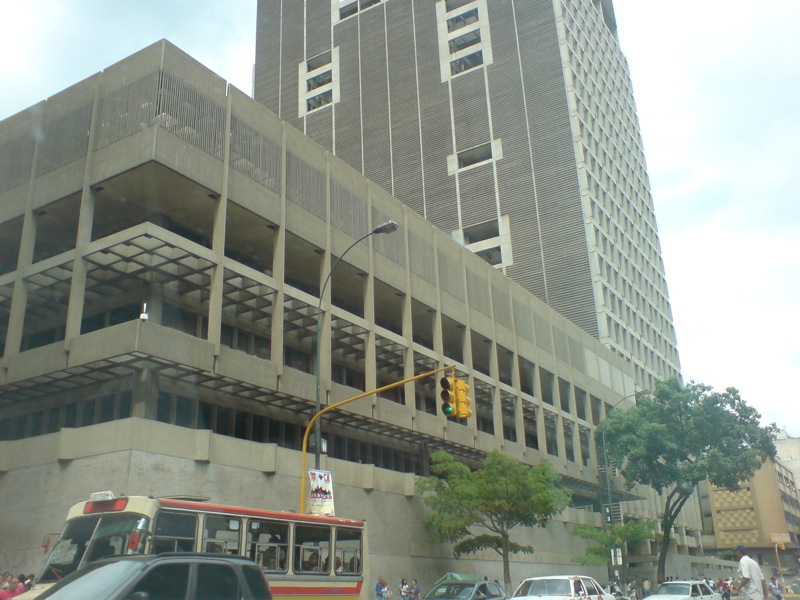
BCV Building

García Araujo was part of Central Bank of Venezuela board of directors between 1968 and 1974. After thirteen years, he was elected president of Central Bank of Venezuela (1987-1989). He was also a member of the board of directos of Petróleos de Venezuela, S.A (PDVSA) and Corporación Venezolana de Guayana (CVG).

== Private sector ==
García Araujo was a consultant for many boards of directors in different Venezuelan holding companies, such as Grupo Vollmer, Grupo Mendoza, Grupo Mercantil and as economical adviser to Hospital de Clinicas Caracas and Electricidad de Caracas, an electricity distribution company. In 2007, Electricidad de Caracas became a government-owned company.

After 1990, Garcia Araujo was known as an expert advising family business organizations in Venezuela. He gave family business conferences within Venezuela and internationally.

== Guild ==
García Araujo was president of Asociación Venezolana de Ejecutivos (AVE) between 1966 and 1968, and a founding and active member of the corporate governance committee in the same institution. AVE is an institution that promotes training and education for Venezuelan managers.

== Academic institutions ==
In 1961, he was a founding member of Institute of Advanced Studies in Administration (IESA) in Caracas. He was a professor at Universidad Rafael Urdaneta in Maracaibo and the founder of Andrés Bello Fellowship at Oxford University.

== Works ==
- García Araujo, Mauricio (1971). El gasto público consolidado en Venezuela: conferencia (in Spanish). Artegraf.
- García Araujo, Mauricio; Olavarría, Jorge (1981). La economía venezolana: de donde viene? hacia dónde va? hay esperanzas? (in Spanish). Resumen.
- Mauricio García Araujo, The impact of petrodollars on the economy and the public sector of Venezuela, Latin American Studies Association, National Meeting, 1982.
- García Araujo, Mauricio (1996). The politics of hydrocarbons in Venezuela. Center for the Study of Western Hemispheric Trade.
- García Araujo, Mauricio; Uslar Pietri, Arturo (1 January 2001). Todo Uslar (in Spanish). Universidad Metropolitana. ISBN 9803662589.
