= Ruth de Krivoy =

Venezuelan economist (born 1942)

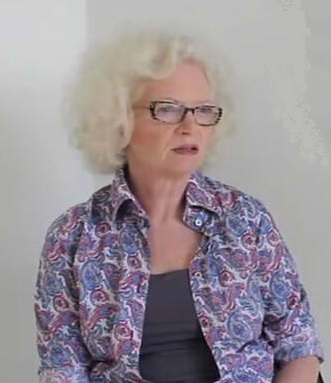
Ruth de Krivoy in 2013

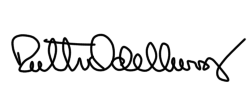
Ruth de Krivoy's signature

Ruth Osterreicher de Krivoy (born 2 July 1942) is a Venezuelan economist specialized on political, monetary and fiscal dynamics. During the early 1970s, she had been vice president of research at the Central Bank of Venezuela, where she played an active role in strengthening economic research as a major instrument of support for monetary policy. In 1992, two months after an attempted coup d'état by Hugo Chavez, she became president of the Central Bank of Venezuela. Her appointment seemed a natural choice, given both her extensive experience and her firm belief in Central Bank independence. She resigned in 1994, amid the Venezuelan banking crisis. De Krivoy wrote a book about the crisis, and has continued to voice concerns about the loss of political independence of the Central Bank's governors.

In 1964 she obtained the title of economist at the Universidad Central de Venezuela as the first woman to graduate summa cum laude and was a member of the board of directors of the Toronto Leadership Centre. She has been a longstanding President of the Venezuelan-based financial advisory firm, Sintensis Financiera, since 1982.

De Krivoy also participated in official government committees on state reform, external public sector debt reform and fiscal reform, and chaired the Venezuelan Presidential Commission on Industrial Competitiveness. She is currently an advisor to the Financial Stability Institute of the BIS, and is a member of the Latin-American Shadow Regulatory Financial Committee, a group of former finance ministers and central bank presidents who meet regularly to discuss regional financial issues.

Krivoy is widely respected for the depth and integrity of her analysis, which are informed by her roles at the highest levels of government, academia and the private sector, confirmed by many papers and articles on monetary, financial and regulatory topics, as well as the book Collapse: The Venezuelan Banking Crisis of 1994, published by The Group of Thirty, Washington, D.C.

== Bibliography ==
- de Krivoy, Ruth (2000). Collapse: The Venezuelan banking crisis of 1994. Group of Thirty. ISBN 978-1-56708-113-8.
