= SUNDDE =

Venezuelan governmental agency

National Superintendence for the Defense of Socioeconomic Rights (SUNDDE)
Agency overview
- Formed: January 2014
- Preceding agency: Superintendency of Costs and Prices (Sundecop)
- Jurisdiction: Department of Commerce
- Headquarters: Caracas, Venezuela
- Agency executive: Willian Antonio Contreras, Superintendent
- Website: SUNDDE

The National Superintendence for the Defense of Socioeconomic Rights (Español: La Superintendencia Nacional para la Defensa de los Derechos Socioeconómicos), abbreviated as SUNDDE, is a Venezuelan governmental organization. Established in 2014, the organization is tasked with the management of price controls and enforcing business compliance with government regulations.

== Description ==
SUNDDE was established in January 2014 with the passing of the Organic Law of Fair Prices^{A}. The organization was formed from the merger of two existing governmental bodies, the Institute for the Defense of People in Access to Goods and the National Superintendency of Costs and Prices (Sundecorp). The stated intent of the organization was to protect the rights of Venezuelan individuals and collectives from what the government defined as socio-economic crimes under the Organic Law of Fair Prices. Specifically, the organization was geared towards protecting consumers from fraudulent sales, usury, overpricing, and non-compliance with warranty licensing. Formed during the Venezuelan economic crisis of 2013-17, the organization was established by way of a law passed with decree authority by President Nicolás Maduro, overriding any potential vote by the Venezuelan legislature. The establishment of SUNDDE came at a time when the previous Venezuelan economic system - in which the government would heavily subsidize imports - had been rendered untenable by the decline of the oil market.

=== Function ===
Operating under the Venezuelan Ministry of Commerce, the organization serves to enforce government ordinances and laws. SUNDDE is able to set prices, wages, and production quotas for all businesses operating in Venezuela on a continuous basis; these controls extend to all sectors of the Venezuelan economy. The organization is also empowered to fine, close, or occupy businesses accused of hoarding or price fixing, and is able to imprison violators. According to documentation, SUNDDE uses cost structure analysis to regulate commercial activity and a market basket of items to fix prices; items subject to price fixing are allotted a "Maximum Price Retail", and the maximum profit ceiling^{B} of all businesses is restricted. Liability for non-compliance with regulations is shared between the offending business and any affiliated businesses in the supply chain, regardless of control or autonomy. SUNDDE officials monitor ticket prices, conduct inspections, and require companies provide access to accounting records. SUNDDE controls the Unique Registry for Persons that Develop Economic Activities (RUPDAE), which issues licenses required to do business in Venezuela, and oversees access to documentation required to obtain hard currency. Broadly empowered under the Law of Fair Prices, SUNDDE is able to suspend any license it issues, and is able to seize goods for resale at its discretion. The organization also plays a role in determining tuition costs and enrollment numbers in private universities.

In the wake of rapid inflation in the Venezuelan economy in 2014 (and the 2017–present economic crisis in Venezuela), SUNDEE was further empowered to combat smuggling, fraud, hoarding, and suspected currency arbitrage, greatly increasing inspections in the process. The organization was also tasked with implementing a biometric-linked food distribution system to combat chronic food shortages and the accompanying rise in smuggling. SUNDDE officials also began exerting control over bakeries, enforcing regulations on the weight and makeup of bread. In November 2015, the governmental body was further enabled to sanction media outlets that promoted content considered to be economic crimes under the Organic Law of Fair Prices.

=== Criticism ===
SUNDDE has been criticized by a number of sources for its policies, with many stating that the organization has a negative effect on the Venezuelan economy. Critics have stated that the organization has contributed to Venezuela's economic condition as tight regulations on business drove many participants out of the economy, resulting in major disruptions in the supply chain. Other critics have noted that the price controls enforced by SUNDDE have not been effective in stabilizing prices; a 2017 New York Times article reported that Venezuelans pay many times more for goods than the price mandated by SUNDDE. According to the International Trade Administration, price controls implemented by SUNDDE have increased the size of the Venezuelan contraband market as artificially price-deflated products are acquired and re-sold at higher prices in open markets, thereby exacerbating shortages inside Venezuela, while the rapidly fluctuating price of goods often leaves businesses in danger of being fined. The effect of the situation is to cause goods shortages, encourage consumer hoarding, and create production inefficiencies - all of which can lead to further sanctions by SUNDDE.

Private companies and analysts have criticized the organization's system of issuing currency licenses as being arbitrary and lacking transparency. Other sources have criticized the internal organization of SUNDDE, alleging corruption, lack of education, and a focus on ideology over efficacy among the organization's inspectors.

The head of SUNDDE, William Antonio Contreras, was added to a sanction list by the U.S. Department of the Treasury in 2018.

== Notable actions ==
- In September 2015, SUNDDE officials and the Venezuelan national guard placed a number of poultry plants under military control, citing allegations of price fixing.
- In December 2016, the organization raided a warehouse used by toy company Kreisel, seizing nearly 4 million toys. SUNDDE announced that it would sell the toys at a high discount, and alleged that Kreisel had stockpiled the toys to create artificial scarcity.
- March 2017 saw SUNDDE officials crack down on several Venezuelan bakers, citing a failure to comply with regulations on bread size and composition. This action came after several bread riots in the country.
- In August 2018, SUNDDE oversaw the occupation of the Venezuelan branch of Irish multinational packaging firm Smurfit Kappa, later ordering the arrest of two of the company's employees on the grounds of price speculation and destabilization of the national economy. The month also saw the organization issue fines to around 500 businesses and the related arrest of 200.

== Notes ==
A. established in Article 10, Numeral 4
B. as of 2019, profit ceilings were up to a maximum of 30%
