= Calixto Ortega Sánchez =

Venezuelan engineer and diplomat

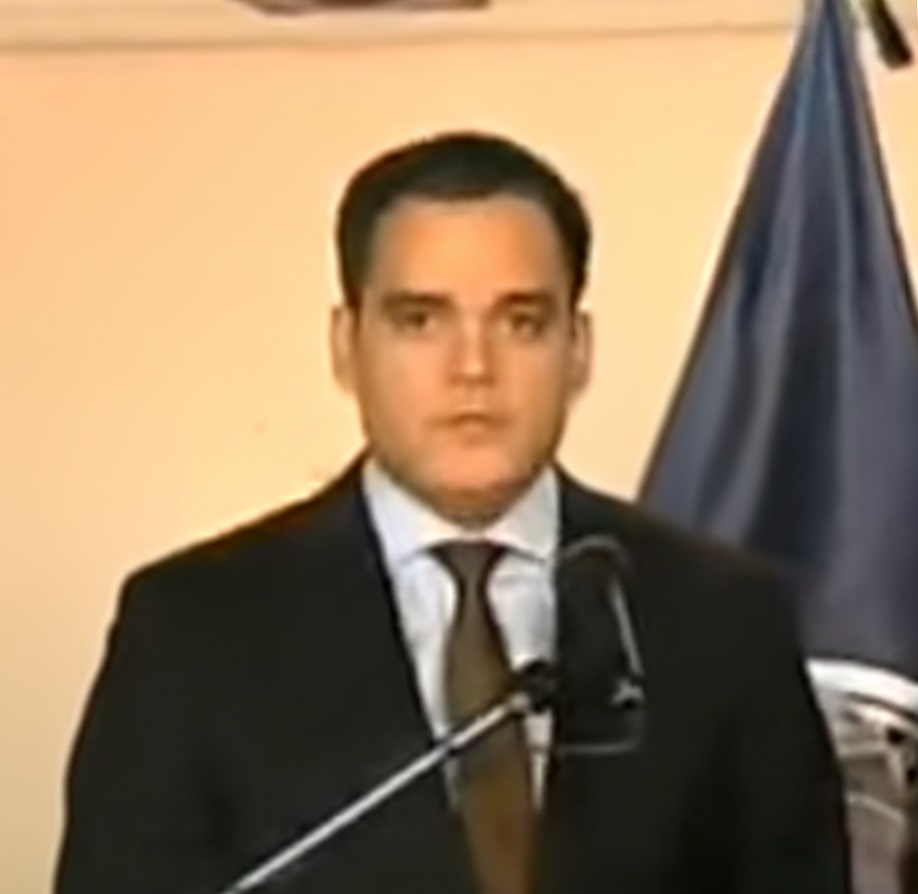
- Calixto Ortega Sánchez in 2018

President of the Central Bank of Venezuela
- In office June 19, 2018 – April 11, 2025
- President: Nicolas Maduro
- Preceded by: Ramón Lobo
- Succeeded by: Laura Guerra Angulo

Personal details
- Education: University of Zulia; Columbia University; Rice University
- Profession: Engineer, diplomat
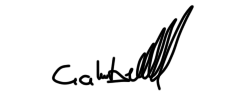
- Signature

Calixto José Ortega Sánchez is a Venezuelan engineer and diplomat who served as the President of the Central Bank of Venezuela from June 2018 to April 2025.

== Education ==
Calixto Ortega graduated from the University of Zulia with the title of industrial engineer. In addition, he completed master's degrees in Finance (MBA) from Rice University, and in Economic Policy Management, from Columbia University in the United States. Among his academic achievements include entering the Honor Roll of the University of Zulia (2003), and more than thirty diplomas of honor for receiving the highest grades.

== Career ==
In 2009, he was one of the members of the Venezuelan diplomatic corps that were given persona non grata while he was consul in Houston in response to a similar measure approved during the Hugo Chavez government against US diplomats in Venezuela. From 2014, he was consul of Venezuela in both Houston and New York and then served as a principal adviser to Petróleos de Venezuela (PDVSA).

In November 2017, eight days before the arrest of the president and five other directors of the subsidiary, José Ángel Pereira Ruimwyk, he was appointed as vice president of administration and finance of Citgo, having joined the company only a couple of months ago. According to an investigation carried out by the journalist Maibort Petit, in the designation the requirements demanded by the United States government to the companies for the approval of the L1 visas, related to the transfers of transnational executives, were violated.

In May 2018, the United States rejected the re-entry of Calixto Ortega into its territory, alleging irregularities in his L1 visa, after having traveled to Venezuela to participate in the 2018 presidential elections, causing him to leave the vice presidency of Citgo.

After President Nicolás Maduro proposal to appoint Calixto Ortega as President, the National Constituent Assembly appointed Calixto Ortega as president of the Central Bank of Venezuela (BCV) to replace Ramon Lobo on 19 June 2018, despite that the constitution of Venezuela and the Central Bank Law establish that the ratification of the Central Bank president must be approved by the National Assembly, which is currently dominated by the opposition Democratic Unity Roundtable.

=== Tenure ===
Calixto Ortega has held the following positions:

- Vice President of Finance of CITGO
- Advisor in Petróleos de Venezuela SA (PDVSA)
- Consul General of Venezuela in New York and Houston, Texas, United States
- Delegate of Venezuela before the Administration and Budget Commission, Permanent Mission of Venezuela to the United Nations
