= Venezuelan banking crisis of 1994 =

1994 Venezuela Banking Crisis

The 1994 banking crisis occurred in Venezuela when a number of the banks of Venezuela were taken over by the government. The first to fail, in January 1994, was Banco Latino, the country's second-largest bank ($1.3 billion bailout). Later, two banks accounting for 18% of total deposits (Banco Consolidado and Banco de Venezuela) also failed. The crisis led President Rafael Caldera to suspend constitutional rights in order to impose price controls; it also exposed deep corruption in the Venezuelan banking system and prompted him to accept the resignation of Finance Minister Julio Sosa Rodriguez.

== History ==
The Venezuelan government spent $5 billion from January to June 1994 to try to rescue 8 banks, which were all declared bankrupt in June 1994. State officials suggested that most of the public funds for recovery had been stolen by bankers fleeing the country's crisis. At this point, reserves at the Central Bank dropped from $12 billion to $8 billion.

On 9 August 1994, Banco de Venezuela became the tenth bank bailed out by the Venezuelan government during the crisis, with the government taking a majority stake for an estimated US$294m. In total, between January 1994 and August 1995, 17 of the country's 49 commercial banks, as well as some subsidiaries, failed—representing 53% of the system assets. Estimates of the total cost of the bailout range from 18 to 31% of GDP; one estimate gives the total cost of the bank bailouts as 1.8 trillion Bolivars, or $12bn.

Economic liberalization in the early 1990s and lax banking supervision had laid the seeds for the crisis, which was then triggered by the cumulative effects of a collapse in the oil price, which led to sharply reduced government spending and weakened the Venezuelan economy.

Ruth de Krivoy, who was president of the Central Bank of Venezuela at the height of the crisis in 1994, later published a book on the episode.

== See also ==
- Second presidency of Rafael Caldera
