= DolarToday =

American website

- Logo of DolarToday since April 2013
- Website type: Politics and finance
- Available in: Spanish
- Website: www.dolartoday.com
- Users: 1.0 million daily
- Launched: May 18, 2010
- Current status: Online

DolarToday is an American website that focuses on Latin American politics and finance. The company is more known for being an exchange rate reference to the Venezuelan bolívar, a currency which is not freely convertible; it is also known for the company's focus in monitoring the Venezuelan economy.

== History ==
=== Founding ===
DolarToday was founded on May 18, 2010. It is headquartered in Miami, Florida, United States. Prior to the election of Nicolás Maduro in 2013, DolarToday was the second most popular exchange rate reference in Venezuela, behind Lechuga Verde. However, when a scandal caused the demise of Lechuga Verde, DolarToday became the most popular exchange rate reference.

Its president is Gustavo Diaz, a Home Depot salesman in Alabama. According to BBC Mundo, DolarToday was founded as "a form of protest against a dictatorship increasingly committed to silence and intimidate the media in Venezuela." The company's website published criticisms about the Maduro administration which the founder states "are selected by the site’s writers based in Venezuela".

=== Loss of popularity ===
As hyperinflation in Venezuela grew out of control, prices changed at such fast paces that Venezuelans no longer relied on the site and would usually set prices on group chats, such as WhatsApp, or through cryptocurrency exchanges.

== Data ==
=== Exchange rates ===
Since its inception, DolarToday has provided black market exchange rates that are updated daily for Venezuelans who cannot exchange currencies with the Venezuelan government for the dwindling supply of the US dollar. The company bases its computed exchange rates of the Venezuelan bolívar to the Euro or the United States dollar from the fees on trades in Cúcuta, Colombia, a city near the border of Venezuela. Currently, with no other reliable source other than the black market exchange rates, these rates are used by Reuters, CNBC, and several media news agencies and networks. The Economist states that the rates calculated by DolarToday are "erratic", but that they are "more realistic than the three official rates" released by the Venezuelan government. The website maintains that the rates are not manipulated in order to undercut the Venezuelan government.

Today the exchange rate of Venezuelan currency, monitored and governed by the Central Bank of Venezuela, is prohibited by the Venezuelan government from being accessed by its citizens. Thus, the exchange rates posted by DolarToday are only accessible outside Venezuela.

=== Inflation rate ===
DolarToday also publishes the implied inflation rate of the Venezuelan bolívar that is based on their currency exchange rates. The implied inflation rate that DolarToday uses is based on information calculated by Steve Hanke of the Cato Institute.

== Controversy ==
DolarToday is used as a reference by several finance websites and medias around the world when it comes to reporting the Venezuelan exchange rate. In 2013, Venezuelan President Nicolás Maduro banned several internet websites, including DolarToday, to prevent its citizens accessing the country's exchange rates. Maduro accused DolarToday of fueling an economic war against his government and manipulating the exchange rate.

=== Censorship ===
"I don’t feel like a rebel. I’m simply a communicator who is bringing information to a country where most media outlets have been hijacked by the government."

— DolarToday founder

According to DolarToday, the Venezuelan government had been attempting to censor the website since November 2013. In March 2015, in a televised appearance, Maduro told the nation that he will ask United States President Barack Obama for the capture of the owners of the company. In a press statement published in the government's website, Maduro's government said that it will exert all legal means against the company in response for defaming the Venezuelan economy. That month, the Venezuelan government attempted to censor the website and brought down websites Amazon, Snapchat, and Pinterest in the process.

Since President Maduro made such comments, DolarToday began to face blockages of their website almost every hour in Venezuela. DolarToday then began using mirror sites on content distribution networks, placing cryptic links on their social media pages to such sites since foreign social media sites are difficult for the Venezuelan government to censor. Each time a mirror site is blocked by the Venezuelan government, DolarToday begins to use a new one, with website engineers finding "ways to automatically create a new mirror site every 20 minutes".

=== Lawsuit ===
On October 23, 2015, the Central Bank of Venezuela (BCV) filed a lawsuit against DolarToday for allegedly falsifying the country's exchange rates. The lawsuit was dismissed by the United States judge on February 26, 2016, with the judge signing that court did not have the authority to take on the case and that BCV lacked standing to sue. In response, BCV filed an amended complaint on March 4, 2016, alleging specific injuries including diminished seigniorage, harm to the reputation of the bank, and deprivation of capital available to the bank.

== Reception ==
Approximately 1 million people visited DolarToday's website daily in 2015. DolarToday's Android and iOS apps were also among the most downloaded by mobile users in Venezuela. It also has more than 3 million Twitter followers, updating them with the up-to-date exchange rates.

The Venezuelan government, however, has viewed DolarToday as a platform to launch an "economic war" against the government, with Fusion stating:

"Dollar Today’s [sic] posts are becoming a source of increasing embarrassment to the Venezuelan government. The site is essentially reminding Venezuelans how life has become increasingly unaffordable under that country’s socialist management".

According to George Selgin, Cato Institute's director of the Center for Monetary and Financial Alternatives, the lawsuit by the Venezuelan government against DolarToday "offers a remarkable glimpse at the twisted logic of totalitarian regimes" and that if something were to happen to the website, the Cato Institute shares the same data and more on their Troubled Currencies Project website. Selgin, regarding to the fact that the Cato Institute publishes the same information as DolarToday, stated:

"So, if the Central Bank of Venezuela really wants to snuff-out information concerning its mismanagement of the bolívar, shutting down DolarToday just won’t cut it: it’s going to have to shut us down as well. So how ‘bout it, guys? Our lawyers can’t wait!"

== Awards and recognition ==
In 2014, DolarToday received a PremiosClick award and was recognized as one of the best 100 websites in Venezuela and one of the best economics websites.
