= Dash (cryptocurrency) =

Cryptocurrency

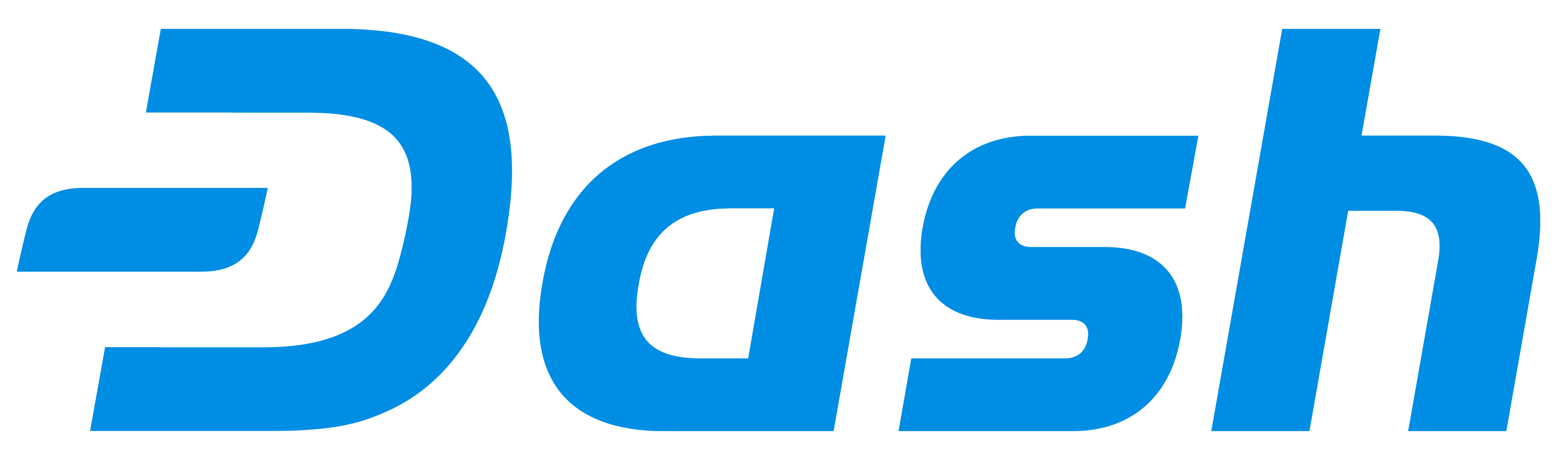
- Dash Logo

Denominations
- Plural: Dash
- Code: DASH
- Previous names: Xcoin, Darkcoin
- Subunits
- 1/100000000: duff
- ?: Dash
- ?: mDash

Development
- Original author: Evan Duffield
- White paper: Whitepaper
- Initial release: 18 January 2014 (12 years ago)
- Latest release: 23.1.9 / 29 October 2026 (18 days ago)
- Code repository: github.com/dashpay
- Project fork of: Bitcoin
- Written in: C++

Ledger
- Timestamping scheme: Proof-of-work
- Hash function: X11
- Issuance schedule: Decentralized, block reward
- Block reward: 1.9063962 DASH (as of 2 August 2024)
- Block time: 2.5 minutes
- Block explorer: insight.dash.org

Demographics
- Official user: Worldwide

Administration
- Date of introduction: 18 January 2014; 12 years ago

Website
- Website: dash.org

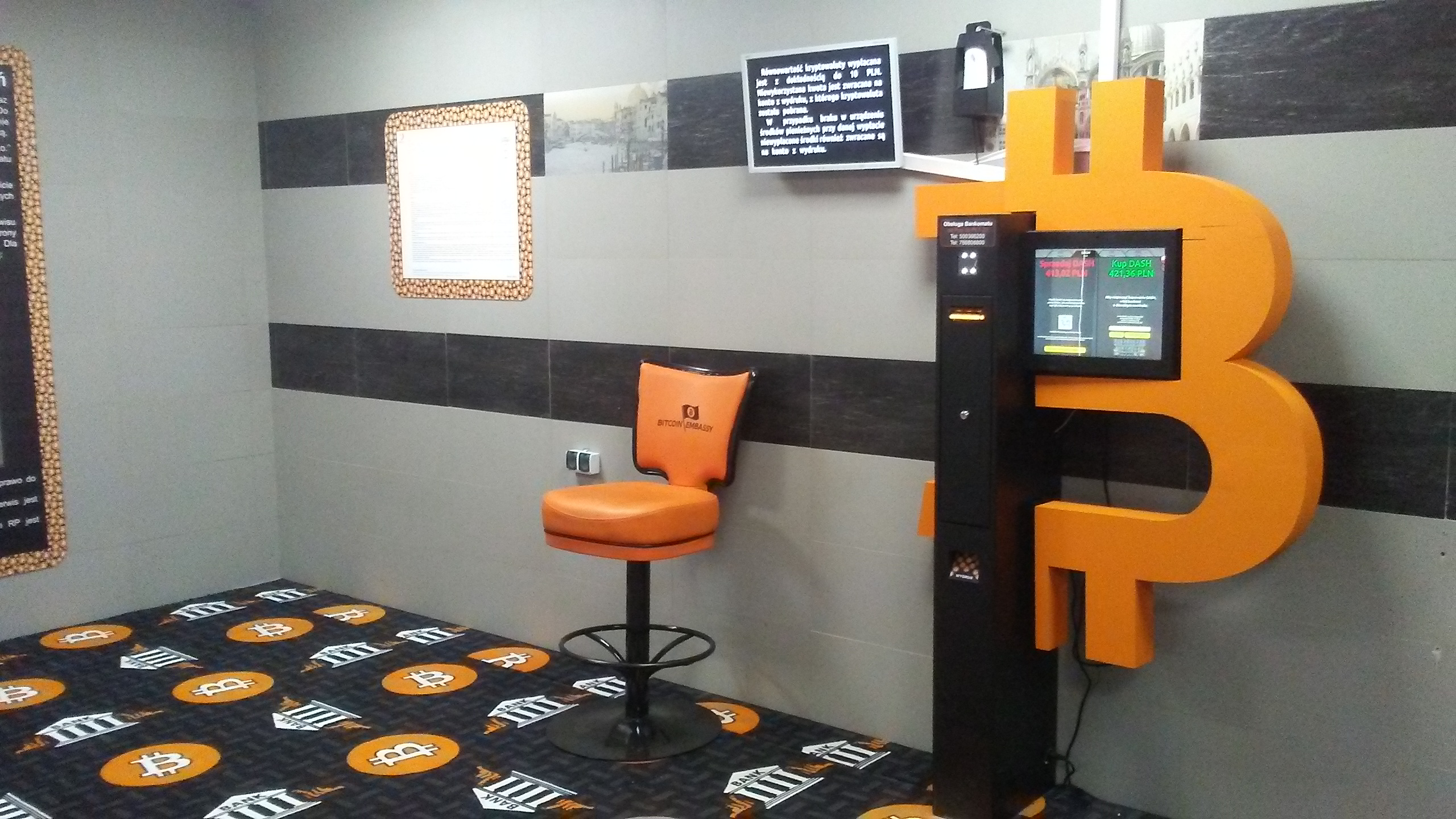
Inside shop with cryptocurrency Dash in Tomaszów Mazowiecki, Poland

Dash is an open source cryptocurrency. It is an altcoin that was forked from the Bitcoin protocol. It is also a decentralized autonomous organization (DAO) run by a subset of its users. It was previously known as Xcoin and Darkcoin.

== History ==
The currency was launched in January 2014 as "Xcoin" by Evan Duffield, as a fork of the Bitcoin protocol. It is an altcoin and in its early days it was subject to pump and dump speculation. It was rebranded as Darkcoin, which received press for being used in dark net markets. In March 2015, it rebranded again with the name Dash as a portmanteau of 'digital cash'. As of August 2016, Dash is no longer used in any major dark net markets.

In early 2017, Duffield, who lived in the Phoenix area, USA, and some other people working on Dash took space in a business incubator at Arizona State University, USA. The Dash DAO later funded a blockchain research lab at ASU.

As of April 2018, Dash's market capitalization was around $4.3 billion and it was one of the top 12 cryptocurrencies.

As of February 2019, Dash was the most popular cryptocurrency in Venezuela according to Der Spiegel. In Venezuela, it was often used alongside Bitcoin and Petro, with Petro basing much of its technology from Dash. On 1 October 2018, Petro switched to an X11 algorithm-based design, which was copied from Dash.

== Design ==
Dash was designed to allow transactions to occur quickly and to implement a governance structure that addresses perceived shortcomings in Bitcoin.

Governance is managed through a form of decentralized autonomous organization in which decisions are made via a blockchain. The system includes standard nodes and miners.

The system's decentralization has been criticized due to a mishap during its initial coin distribution, which allowed too many coins to be distributed at release. This concentrated wealth within a small group of early adopters, giving them disproportionate power in decisions regarding the currency’s future.

As of 2018, coins were mined using a proof of work algorithm with a hash function called "X11," which involves eleven rounds of hashing. The average time to mine a block was around two and a half minutes.
