= Viernes Negro =

1983 Venezuelan currency devaluation

Viernes Negro (English: Black Friday) in Venezuela refers to Friday, 18 February 1983, when the Venezuelan bolívar was devalued substantially against the US dollar. This event caused a significant destabilization of the currency and the Venezuelan economy.

== Background ==
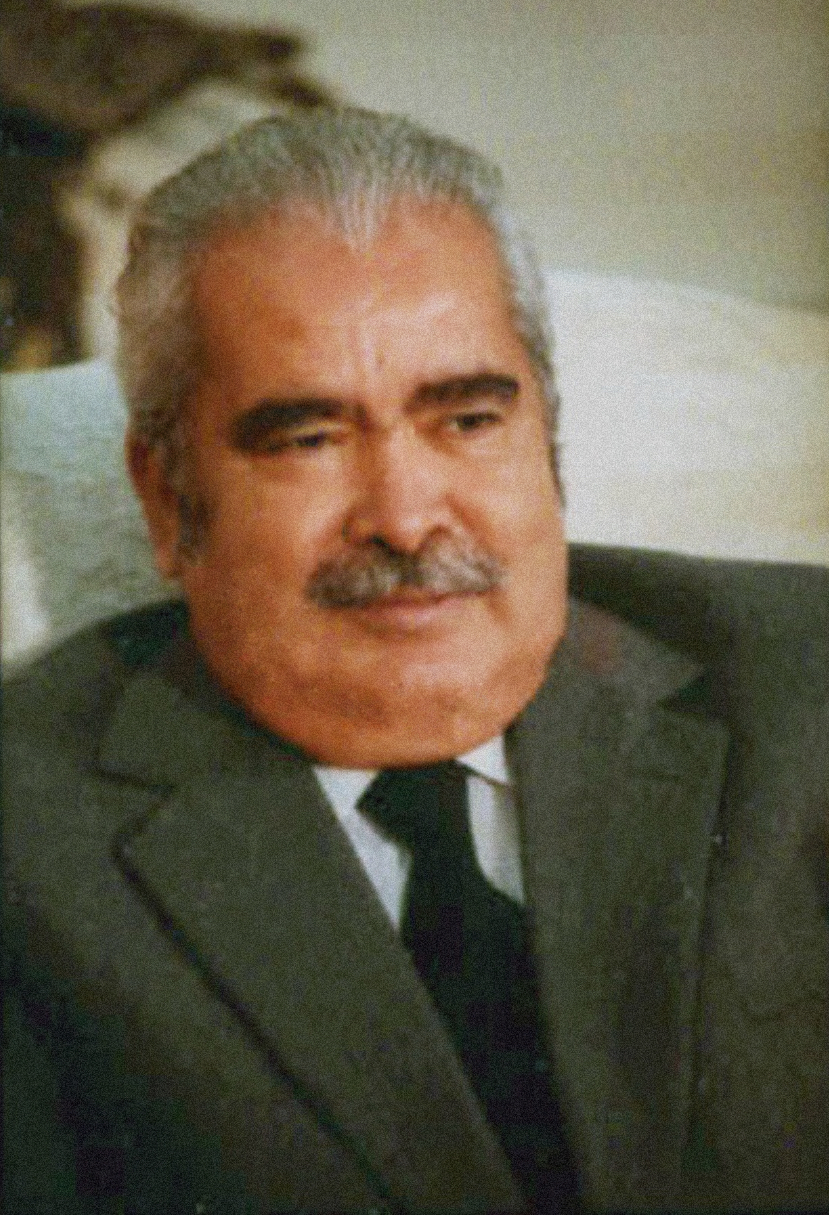
Luis Herrera Campins

When Luis Herrera Campins became President in 1979, he received a "mortgaged Venezuela". Viernes Negro in Venezuela was preceded by events such as the departure of Venezuela from the gold standard, the nationalization of oil, and the beginning of a stage of decreasing public spending compared with State revenue. The situation worsened and was evident with the fall in oil prices that led to oil exports dropping from $19.3 billion in 1981 to around $13.5 billion in 1983 (a decrease of 30%), and the beginning of the Latin American debt crisis. These events produced a flight of capital of almost $8 billion and a corresponding decline in international reserves. President Herrera Campins also created different exchange rates for imports and exports, creating economic distress in national revenue and for transfer of goods, which contributed to the decline and ultimate devaluation.

== Viernes Negro ==
The devaluation happened because of President Luis Herrera Campins' economic policies. Following the oil price crisis, the Herrera Campins government declared bankruptcy to the international banking community and then enacted currency restrictions. The policies centred on the establishment of an exchange-rate regime, imposing a restriction on the movement of currencies, and were strongly objected to by the then-president of the Central Bank of Venezuela, Leopoldo Díaz Bruzual. The currency controls devalued Venezuelan purchasing power by 75% in a matter of hours; banks did not open on Viernes Negro, and even the Central Bank did not have many reserves of foreign currencies, causing the government to devalue the bolívar by 100%.

Controversy occurred when it was revealed that corporations were told of the restrictions in advance and began stockpiling US dollars.

== Aftermath ==
Since then, Viernes Negro represents a milestone; the day that changed Venezuela's economic history. Before it, the bolívar had been characterized as stable and reliable since the 1910s, with its last free price against the dollar at a fixed value of 4.30:1. Since Viernes Negro, the economic situation of the nation has been tumultuous. The exchange stability of the Venezuelan currency disappeared because of constant devaluation of the bolívar, complications with the payment of external debt, the accelerated deterioration of purchasing power, and the implementation of an exchange control called "Regime of Differential Exchange" (RECADI) — operating from 28 February 1983 to 10 February 1989, and marked by serious cases of corruption during the government of Jaime Lusinchi.

== See also ==
- Viernes Rojo
