= Banco de Venezuela =

Public bank in Venezuela

Banco de Venezuela S.A.

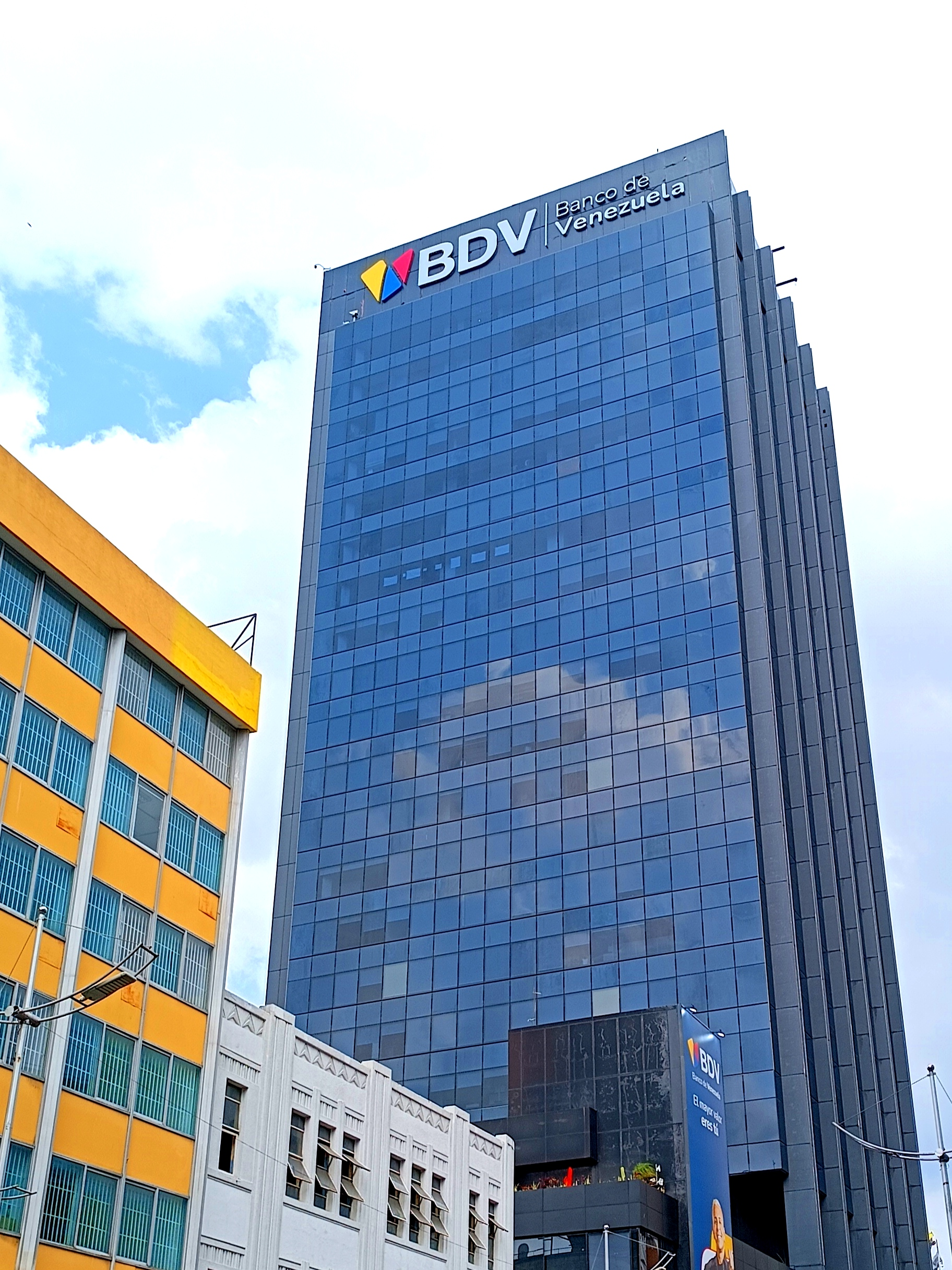
- Banco de Venezuela's headquarters in Caracas
- Type: Joint stock company
- Industry: Finance and insurance
- Founded: 1883 (as Banco Comercial); 2 September 1890; 136 years ago (as Banco de Venezuela)
- Headquarters: Caracas, Venezuela
- Products: Financial services
- Number of employees: 4,050
- Website: www.bancodevenezuela.com

Banco de Venezuela (abbreviated: BDV) is an international universal bank based in Caracas. It was the market leader in Venezuela until 2007, when it fell to third place, with an 11.3% market share for deposits; its major competitors are Banesco, Banco Mercantil and BBVA Banco Provincial. As of June 2008, it had 285 branches in Venezuela.

== History ==
The bank was founded in 1883 as Banco Comercial, which on 2 September 1890 changed its name to Banco de Venezuela. It was initially a loan and taxation financial institution for the Venezuelan government. In 1920, it had already established 10 branches in the country, and due to the lack of a central bank, the Banco de Venezuela became one of the six financial institutions with the right to issue banknotes, until the creation of the Banco Central de Venezuela in 1940.

In 1976, BDV inaugurated its hundredth branch nationwide. In 1978 the bank introduced 24-hour customer service, credit cards and new point of sales terminals. The bank opened branches in New York and Curaçao in 1977 and 1979 respectively, and two years later founded a subsidiary, Banco de Venezuela International, to offer a better service outside the country. In 1984, the bank inaugurated its new headquarters in the center of Caracas.

On 6 October 2000, BDV purchased 100% of Banco Caracas, becoming the largest bank in the country.

=== State involvement ===
In 1993, after three years struggle for shareholder control, Banco de Venezuela was taken over by Banco Consolidado to form Banco de Venezuela y Consolidado. However, Banco Consolidado was closed during the Venezuelan banking crisis of 1994. Following the closure, BDV suffered financial problems in the context of the national financial crisis. On 9 August 1994, BDV became the tenth bank bailed out by the Venezuelan government during the crisis, with the government taking a majority stake for an estimated at US$294m. In 1996 the bank was reprivatised, with Grupo Santander purchasing 93.38% of its shares, for around US$350m.

In June 2008, Grupo Santander began discussion with Venezuelan banker Victor Vargas, regarding a possible acquisition of BDV, but the Venezuelan government stopped the negotiations. On 31 July of the same year, Venezuelan President Hugo Chávez stated: "I'm interested in the purchase (by the government) and we going to nationalize it". However by March 2009 negotiations with Grupo Santander had still not been completed, and Finance Minister Ali Rodriguez said it was possible the takeover could be abandoned.

In June 2008 talks began with Banco Occidental de Diseño (BOD) to absorb Grupo Santander's participation in Venezuela, creating the first bank in that country, owever, the Venezuelan government prevented the acquisition and on 31 July of that year, President Hugo Chávez announced on national broadcaster that the bank would be nationalized. On 22 May 2009, the purchase agreement was signed between the Venezuelan government and Grupo Santander for an amount of 1,050 million dollars. On 3 July 2009 the Bank of Venezuela became 50% managed by the Venezuelan government.

Since its nationalization, it has grown by more than one million clients between June 2009 and March 2011, going from 3,310,000 to 4,427,000 clients. Also in the same period, credits for the acquisition of homes increased by 275.4%, going from 582 million bolivars in June 2009 to a total of 2,185 million bolivars recorded in January 2011. On 15 September 2021, the bank had a multi-day outage in its electronic banking services, affecting 14 million customers.

On 27 September 2021, the departure of José Javier Morales as president of the bank was announced, as was the appointment to his position of Román Maniglia, son of Orlando Maniglia and Carmen Meléndez. BdV Online is the online service of the Bank of Venezuela (BDV). Morales' departure was a few days after the bank's digital service crashed, leaving users without access to their accounts for more than 100 hours.

On 10 June 2022, the vice president of Venezuela, Delcy Rodríguez, announced the decision of the National Executive on the public offer of between 5 and 10% of the shares of the Bank of Venezuela, the same action announced on month of May of the same year by the president of the republic, Nicolás Maduro, with the state companies CANTV and Movilnet.
