= BCV Building =

- Banco Central de Venezuela
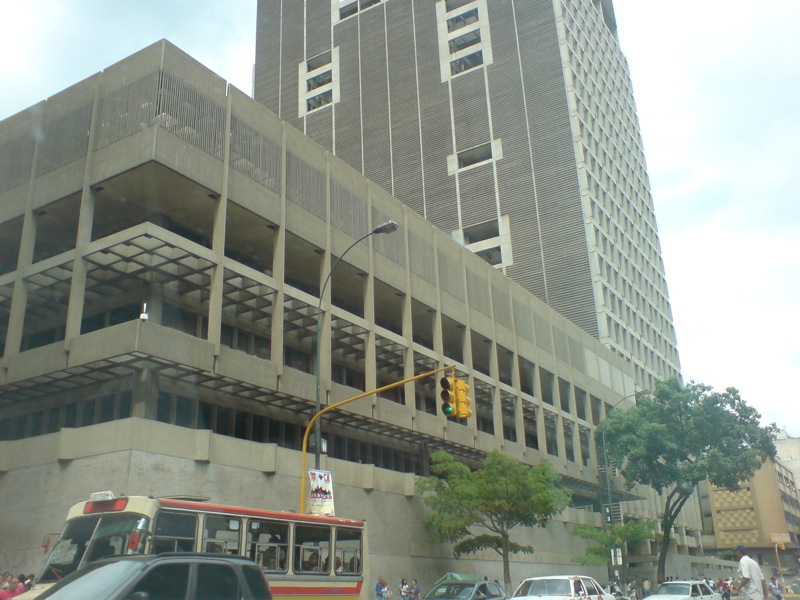
- Interactive map of the BCV Building area

General information
- Status: Completed
- Type: Office
- Location: Caracas, Venezuela
- Coordinates: 10.5082°N 66.9149°W
- Construction started: 1962
- Completed: 1967
- Owner: Banco Central de Venezuela C. A.

Height
- Roof: 117 m (384 ft)

Technical details
- Floor count: 26
- Floor area: 27.000 m^{2}

Design and construction
- Architect: Tomás Sanabria

The BCV Building (also known as Central Bank of Venezuela Building) is an office building located on Avenida Urdaneta, Caracas, Venezuela and is the headquarters of the Banco Central de Venezuela. It is also the largest funder of the city and covers 27.000 m^{2} at street level. The building was completed in 1965 and was opened the same year; a second compound was built in 1967, which is a tower that reaches 117 meters high and has 26 floors.
