= University Fermín Toro =

Private university in Venezuela

- Universidad Fermín Toro
- Type: private
- Established: 1989
- Rector: Dr. Jorge Ramón Benítez
- Location: Cabudare, Lara, Venezuela
- Website: http://www.uft.edu.ve/

The University Fermín Toro (UFT) is a private university. It is in Cabudare, Lara, Venezuela. It was founded on 9 May 1989 according to the decree Number 168 of the National Executive. The Founder was Dr. Raúl Quero Silva, President of the Upper Council of the institution and of the Educational Complex "Antonio José of Sucre". The institution started in Cabudare, but also has campuses in Barquisimeto. The university has a library, bookshop, a clinic and computer laboratory. Students have email and access to the Internet.

== History ==
On 5 May 2014, during the 2014 Venezuelan protests, armed colectivos attacked and burned a large portion of Fermín Toro University after intimidating student protesters and shooting one. The colectivos damaged 40% of the university and looted items after breaking into the facility.

== Faculties ==
=== Engineering ===
- Engineering in Computation
- Engineering in Mechanical Maintenance
- Electrical engineering
- Engineering of Telecommunications

=== Economic and Social sciences ===
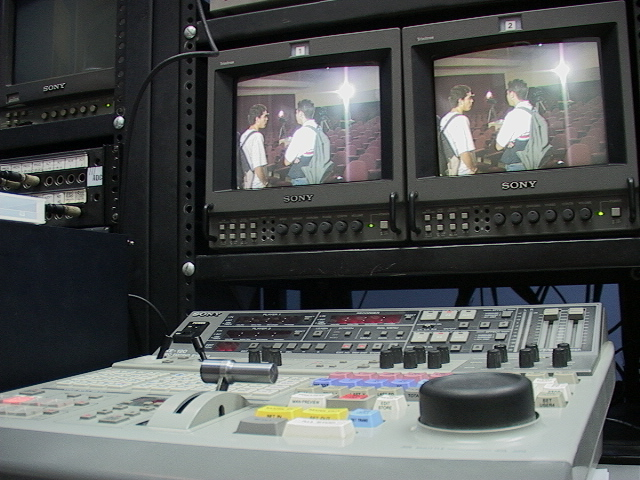
UFT Television, a televisora university cultural

- Administration
- Social communication
- Industrial relations

=== Juridical and Political sciences ===
- Political sciences
- Law

== Headquarters ==
- Barinas (State Barinas)
- Cabudare (State Lara)
- Barquisimeto (State Lara)
- Acarigua (State Portuguesa)
- Guanare (State Portuguesa)
- El Vigía (State Mérida)

== See also ==
- Official page of the UFT
- Universia Venezuela
