= Gastón Parra =

Venezuelan businessman

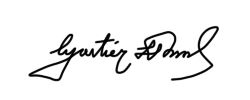
Gastón Parra's signature

Gastón Luis Parra Luzardo (9 December 1933 – 14 December 2008) was a Venezuelan academic, who until his death was president of the Central Bank of Venezuela. He was appointed to the position in 2005. In 2002 he was briefly chairman of the state-owned oil company Petróleos de Venezuela S.A. Parra died on December 14, 2008, at the age of 75, at the Caracas hospital after a long time of illness.
