= Central Bank of Venezuela =

Monetary authority of Venezuela

Coordinates: 10.5100°N 66.9152°W

Central Bank of Venezuela Banco Central de Venezuela
- Central bank of: Venezuela
- Headquarters: Avenida Urdaneta, Caracas 1010, Venezuela
- Established: 8 September 1939; 87 years ago
- Ownership: 100% state ownership
- President: Luis Alberto Pérez González
- Currency: Venezuelan bolívar VED (ISO 4217)
- Reserves: $9.8 billion
- Website: www.bcv.org.ve

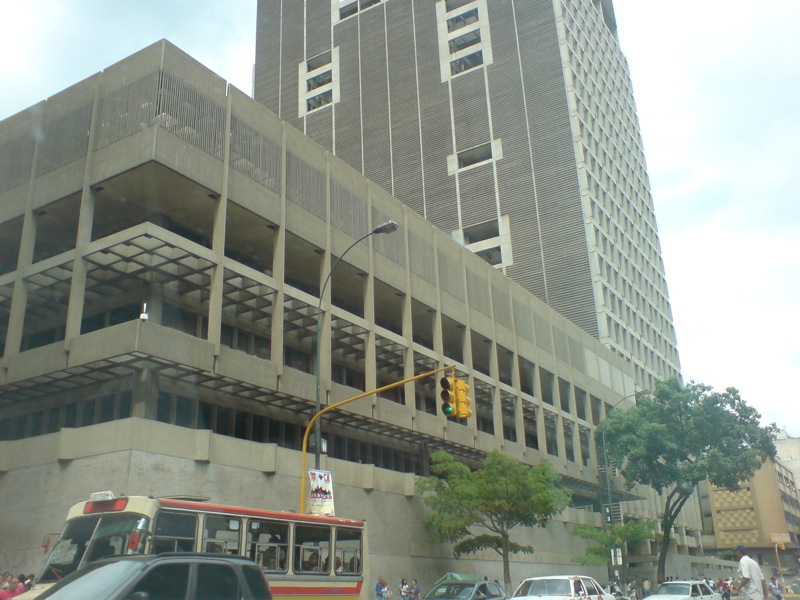
Central Bank of Venezuela Building

The Central Bank of Venezuela (Spanish: Banco Central de Venezuela, BCV) is the central bank of Venezuela. It is responsible for issuing and maintaining the value of the Venezuelan bolívar and is the governing agent of the Venezuelan Clearing House System (including an automated clearing house).

== History ==
=== Foundation and currency management ===
Since its inception in the late 1930s, the BCV was given a clear mandate to control the monetary policy of the nation, centralizing the operations of a handful of private banks that used to mint the Venezuelan currency, the bolívar. For almost 50 years the BCV managed to sustain a remarkable strong currency, with inflation rates hovering on the 2-3% mark during that period.

=== 1980s oil glut ===
However, since the oil glut of the 1980s and the first serious devaluation of the currency in 1983 (known in Venezuela as Viernes Negro, or Black Friday) the bolívar has been plagued with chronic instability, mistrust and declining value that has been fed by the continued rise in inflation, topping an estimate for 2018 of one million per cent. Most of the foreign reserves are held as gold bars in Germany (almost 64%).

Until 2015 the Supplementary System for the Administration of Foreign Currency (SICAD) operated as an alternative foreign exchange system for businesses and individuals. Given its ineffectiveness and the continued rise of the parallel (black market) exchange rate the system was discontinued in favor of the "Complementary Currency System", known for its Spanish acronym DICOM.

=== 2017: Hyperinflation ===
Since December 2017 Venezuela the CPI has presented a behavior that fits most of the definitions for hyperinflation, the first in the country's history. The bank, subject to a strong control by the executive branch of the Venezuelan government, has ceased the publication of metrics such as the CPI and gross domestic product variation, creating a vacuum that has left investors and the public in a general state of disarray.

=== 2019: Sanctions ===
In April 2019, the U.S. Treasury Department sanctioned the Central Bank of Venezuela "to prevent it from being used as a tool of the illegitimate Maduro regime".

== Mandate ==
By law, the Central Bank of Venezuela is autonomous to formulate and exercise policies in its field of competence and it performs its duties and functions in coordination with the general economic policy. The Constitution grants the central bank autonomy to outline and implement the policies. However, as of 2016, reforms deemed unconstitutional by some effectively nullified the BCV's independent status.

The export, import or trade of Venezuelan or foreign currency are subject to the regulations established by the BCV, including the departure or arrival of coin and notes made by another countries by BCV's express order.

== System for Transactions with Foreign Currency Securities ==
The Central Bank is able to issue bonds through the System for Transactions with Foreign Currency Securities (SITME). In 2012, it was reported that $44 million worth of bonds were purchased through SITME in a single day for Petróleos de Venezuela, S.A.

== Presidents of the Central Bank of Venezuela ==
President	Took office	Left office	Notes
Jesús Herrera Mendoza	1940	1948	
Carlos Mendoza Goiticoa	1948	1953	
Aurelio Arreaza Arreaza	1953	1958	
Alfonso Espinosa	1958	1960	
Alfredo Machado Gómez	1961	1968	
Benito Raúl Losada	1968	1971	
Alfredo Lafée	1971	1976	
Benito Raúl Losada	1976	1979	
Carlos Rafael Silva	1979	1981	
Leopoldo Díaz Bruzual	1981	1984	
Benito Raúl Losada	1984	1986	
Hernán Anzola	1986	1987	
Mauricio García Araujo	1987	1989	
Pedro R. Tinoco	1989	1992	
Miguel Rodríguez Fandeo	1992		
Ruth de Krivoy	1992	1994	
Antonio Casas González	1994	1999	
Diego Luis Castellanos	2000	2005	
Gastón Parra Luzardo	2005	2009	
Nelson Merentes	2009	2013	
Edmée Betancourt	2013		
Eudomar Tovar	2013	2014	
Nelson Merentes	2014	2017	
Ricardo Sanguino	2017		
Ramón Augusto Lobo Moreno	2017	2018	
Calixto Ortega Sánchez	2018	2025	
Laura Guerra Angulo	2025	2026	
Luis Alberto Pérez González	2026	present	

== See also ==
- Venezuela and the International Monetary Fund
- List of central banks
