= Twelve-and-a-half céntimo coin =

Money of Venezuela

Locha
- Venezuela
- Value: 0.125 bolívar
- Mass: 3.93 g
- Diameter: 23 mm
- Edge: plain
- Shape: round
- Composition: nickel-plated steel
- Years of minting: 1896–1969, 2007–2018

Obverse
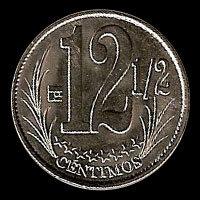
- Design: Denomination of the coin, the eight stars of the national flag and two palm branches

Reverse
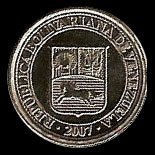
- Design: Coat of arms of Venezuela and the name of the country of issue

The Venezuelan twelve-and-a-half-céntimo coin (12 1/2 céntimos), was a cupro-nickel money and that was worth one-eighth of a silver Venezuelan Bolivar (VEB), this round piece of metal was known also with the very popular nicknames of "locha" (pronounced [ˈlotʃa]) or "cuartillo" (pronounced [kwaɾˈtiʝo]).

The Venezuelan Coinage Act of 31 March 1879, established the Bolivar as the official currency, one locha was equivalent in value to 1/8 bolívar, 2 1/2 centavos and 1/4 real; these coins were minted in Germany, the United States and Spain in the years 1896, 1925, 1927, 1929, 1936, 1938, 1944, 1945, 1946, 1948, 1958 and 1969; in 1971, cupronickel 10-céntimo coins were issued to replace the 12 1/2-céntimo coin which had last been issued in 1969. Rising inflation and hyperinflation depreciated the value of these coins in relation to the value of their make them up materials; this depreciation led to their eventual abandonment. None were made after the 1970s until 2007.

The last 12 1/2 céntimos coins were issued with a series of novel features since its last issuance by the monetary authority Central Bank of Venezuela (in Spanish BCV) since 2007 through 2018. They had a diameter of 23 mm and a thickness of 1.3 mm. Its composition was plated steel in nickel; the edge (outer edge) of these coins had an aesthetically smooth design. These coins were minted by Casa de la Moneda de Venezuela.

These new series coins were affected depreciation too and they disappeared from the country's economy, after the currency redenomination of August 2018 and due to the hyperinflation that currently affects it. No coins with a face value of 12 1/2 céntimos have been produced since then as the lowest denomination of the sovereign bolívar (2018) is the 50 céntimo coin and that of the digital bolívar (2021) is the 25 céntimo coin.

== See also ==
- Bolivar (currency)
- Central Bank of Venezuela
- Venezuelan bolívar
- Hard bolívar
- Céntimo
- Half crown (British coin)
