= Venezuelan bolívar =

Currency of Venezuela

bolívar digital venezolano (Spanish)
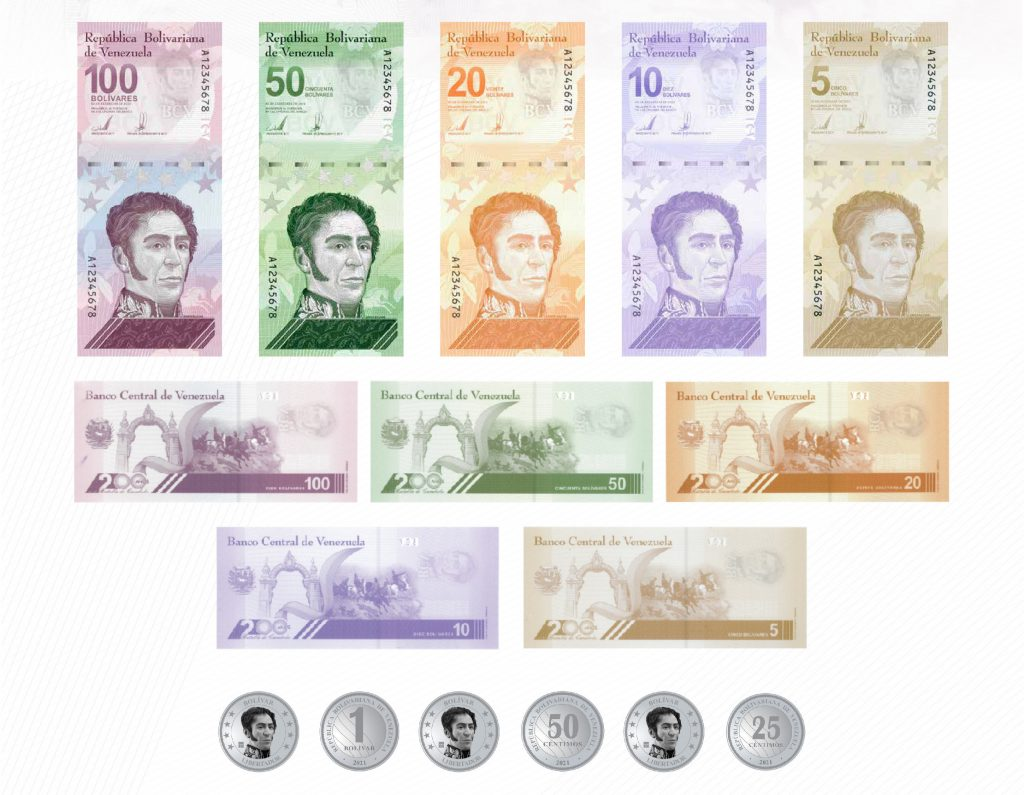
- Venezuelan Bolívar digital Banknotes

ISO 4217
- Code: VED (numeric: 926)
- Subunit: 0.01

Units of account
- Base unit: bolívar
- Plural: bolívares
- Symbol: Bs. or Bs.D
- Nickname: bolo(s), luca(s), real(es)
- Subunit
- 1/100: céntimo

Denominations
- Banknotes: Bs. 5, Bs. 10, Bs. 20, Bs. 50, Bs. 100, Bs. 200, Bs. 500
- Coins: 25, 50 céntimos, Bs. 1

Demographics
- User(s): Venezuela

Issuance
- Central bank: Banco Central de Venezuela
- Website: www.bcv.org.ve

Valuation
- Inflation: ▼629.66% (M2; annual; April 2026)

The bolívar (Spanish: [boˈliβaɾ]) is the official currency of Venezuela. Named after the hero of South American independence Simón Bolívar, it was introduced by President Antonio Guzmán Blanco via the monetary reform of 1879, before which the venezolano was circulating. Due to its decades-long reliance on silver and gold standards, and then on a peg to the United States dollar, it was long considered among the most stable currencies.

Since 1983, the currency has experienced a prolonged period of high inflation, losing value almost 500-fold against the US dollar in the process. The depreciation became manageable in the mid-2000s, but it remained in double digits. It was then, on 1 January 2008, that the hard bolívar (bolívar fuerte in Spanish, sign: Bs.F, code: VEF) replaced the original bolívar (sign: Bs; code: VEB) at a rate of Bs.F 1 to Bs. 1,000 (the abbreviation Bs. is due to the first and the final letters of the plural form of the currency's name, bolívares).

The value of the hard bolívar, pegged to the US dollar, did not stay stable for long despite attempts to institute capital controls. Venezuela entered another period of abnormally high inflation in 2012, which the country has not exited as of April 2023. The central bank stuck to the pegged subsidised exchange rate until January 2018, which was overpriced so people began using parallel exchange rates despite a ban on publishing them. From 2016 to 2019 and again in 2020, the currency experienced hyperinflation for a total period of 38 months.

The rampant inflation prompted another two redenominations. The first occurred in August 2018, when Bs.F 100,000 were exchanged for 1 sovereign bolívar (bolívar soberano in Spanish, sign: Bs.S, code: VES). The second one, dubbed the "nueva expresión monetaria" or new monetary expression, occurred on 1 October 2021, when Bs.S 1,000,000 were exchanged for 1 digital bolívar (Note: Despite the name, banknotes and coins for the currencies were issued, and the Financial Times described it as "no more digital than any other currency".) (bolívar digital in Spanish, sign: Bs.D, code: VED), thus making one digital bolívar worth 100,000,000,000,000 (10^{14}, or Bs. 100 trillion in short scale) of the pre-2008 bolívares.

Bolívares are officially in circulation (and the sole legal tender in the country), though the economy has undergone extensive currency substitution, so the majority of transactions happen in US dollars and euros, or, to a lesser extent, Colombian pesos. Goods and services in Venezuela are primarily priced in U.S. dollars, but payments may be made in bolívares (at the official exchange rate on that day, published by the Central Bank of Venezuela).

The high level of inflation has caused problems for the Venezuelan economy. Many Venezuelans are poor and do not have enough money to afford food, water, or medicine due to the hyperinflation.

== History ==
=== Bolívar ===
Bolívar
Preceded by: Venezolano; Reason: unification of circulating currencies Ratio: 1 bolívar = 1/5 venezolano	Currency of Venezuela; 31 March 1879 – 31 December 2007	Succeeded by: Hard bolívar Reason: inflation Ratio: 1 hard bolívar = 1000 bolívares

Venezuelan bolívar
bolívar (Spanish)

ISO 4217
- Code: VEB

Units of account
- Plural: bolívares
- Symbol: Bs
- Subunit
- 1/100: céntimo
- Plural
- céntimo: céntimos

Denominations
- Banknotes: Bs. 1,000, Bs. 2,000, Bs. 5,000, Bs. 10,000, Bs. 20,000, Bs. 50,000
- Coins: Bs. 10, Bs. 20, Bs. 50, Bs. 100, Bs. 500, Bs. 1,000

Demographics
- User(s): Venezuela

Issuance
- Central bank: Banco Central de Venezuela
- Website: www.bcv.org.ve
- This infobox shows the latest status before this currency was rendered obsolete.

The bolívar is named after the hero of South American independence Simón Bolívar. The bolívar was introduced by President Guzman Blanco, who around one hundred years after Simón Bolívar's birth, undertook various projects to honour his contribution to Venezuelan history. The coin appeared in the monetary law of 1879, replacing the short-lived venezolano at a rate of five bolívares to one venezolano. Initially, the bolívar was defined on the silver standard, equal to 4.5 g fine silver, following the principles of the Latin Monetary Union. The monetary law of 1887 made the gold bolívar unlimited legal tender, and the gold standard came into full operation in 1910. Venezuela went off gold in 1930, and in 1934, the bolívar exchange rate was fixed in terms of the US dollar at a rate of Bs. 3.914 = US$1, revalued to Bs. 3.18 = 1 US dollar in 1937, a rate which lasted until 1941. Until 18 February 1983 (now called Viernes Negro, Spanish for Black Friday, by many Venezuelans), the bolívar had been the region's most stable and internationally accepted currency. It then fell prey to high overall rates of devaluation.

Exchange controls were imposed on February 5, 2003, to limit capital flight. The rate was pegged to the US dollar at a fixed exchange rate of Bs. 1,600 to the dollar.

=== Hard bolívar ===
Hard bolívar
Preceded by: Bolívar; Reason: inflation Ratio: 1 hard bolívar = 1000 bolívares	Currency of Venezuela; 1 January 2008 – 20 August 2018	Succeeded by: Sovereign bolívar Reason: hyperinflation Ratio: 1 sovereign bolívar = 100,000 hard bolívares

Venezuelan hard bolívar
bolívar fuerte (Spanish)

ISO 4217
- Code: VEF

Units of account
- Plural: bolívares fuertes
- Symbol: Bs.F or Bs.
- Nickname: bolo(s), luca(s), real(es)
- Subunit
- 1/100: céntimo

Denominations
- Banknotes
- Freq. used: Bs.F 1,000, Bs.F 2,000, Bs.F 5,000, Bs.F 10,000, Bs.F 20,000, Bs.F 100,000
- Rarely used: Bs.F 2, Bs.F 5, Bs.F 10, Bs.F 20, Bs.F 50, Bs.F 100, Bs.F 500
- Coins
- Rarely used: Bs.F 1, Bs.F 10, Bs.F 50, and Bs.F 100

Demographics
- User(s): Venezuela

Issuance
- Central bank: Banco Central de Venezuela
- Website: www.bcv.org.ve

Valuation
- Inflation: ▲80,000% (2018 est.)
- Pegged with: US$1 = BsF. 248,832 (Dicom auction) (see this section for parallel market rate)
- This infobox shows the latest status before this currency was rendered obsolete. Coins and low-value banknotes were rendered obsolete by hyperinflation.

The government announced on 7 March 2007 that the bolívar would be redenominated at a ratio of 1,000 to 1 on 1 January 2008 and renamed the bolívar fuerte, or hard bolívar in an effort to facilitate the ease of transaction and accounting. The newer name literally means "hard bolívar", as in hard currency, and in reference to an old coin called the peso fuerte worth 10 Spanish reales. The alternate meaning of "strong" was also used by the government in promotional material The official exchange rate is restricted to individuals by CADIVI, which imposes an annual limit on the amount available for travel.

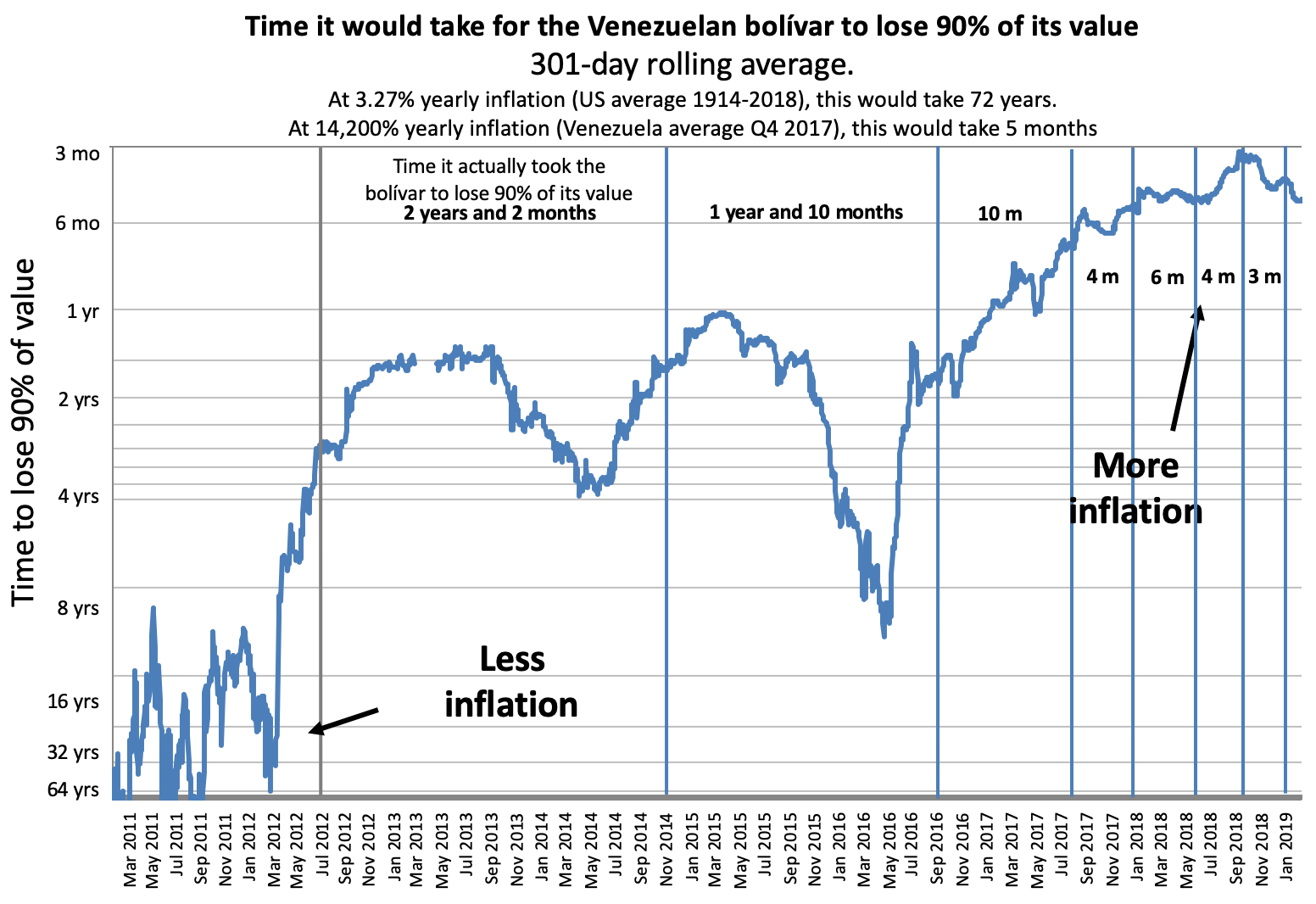
Inflation represented by the time it would take, in years, for money to lose 90% of its value (301-day rolling average, inverted logarithmic scale).

Since the government of Hugo Chávez established strict currency controls in 2003, there have been a series of five currency devaluations, disrupting the economy. On 8 January 2010, the value was changed by the government from the fixed exchange rate of Bs.F 2.15 to Bs.F 2.60 for some imports (certain foods and healthcare goods) and Bs.F 4.30 for other imports like cars, petrochemicals, and electronics. On 4 January 2011, the fixed exchange rate became Bs.F 4.30 for US$1.00 for both sides of the economy. On 13 February 2013 the hard bolívar was devalued to Bs.F 6.30 per US$1 in an attempt to counter budget deficits. On 18 February 2016, Nicolás Maduro used his newly granted economic powers to devalue the official exchange rate of the hard bolívar from Bs.F 6.30 per US$1 to Bs.F 10 per US$1, which was a 37% depreciation against the US dollar.

The hard bolívar entered hyperinflation in November 2016.

On January 26, 2018, the government retired the protected and subsidized Bs.F 10 per US$1 exchange rate that was highly overvalued as a result of rampant inflation. On February 5, 2018, the Central Bank of Venezuela announced a 99.6% [sic] devaluation, with the exchange rate going to Bs.F 25,000 per US$. This made the hard bolívar the second-least-valued circulating currency in the world based on the official exchange rate, behind only the Iranian rial, and between September 2017 and August 2018, according to the informal exchange rate, the hard bolívar was the least-valued circulating currency unit in the world.

The official exchange rate stood at Bs.F 248,832 to US$1 as of August 10, 2018, making it the least-valued circulating currency in the world overall based on official exchange rates.

In June 2018, the government authorized a new exchange rate for buying, but not selling, currency. On August 13, 2018, the rate was Bs.F 4,010,000 to US$1, according to ZOOM Remesas.

=== Sovereign bolívar ===
Sovereign bolívar
Preceded by: Hard bolívar Reason: hyperinflation Ratio: 1 sovereign bolívar = 100,000 hard bolívares	Currency of Venezuela; 20 August 2018 – 5 August 2021	Succeeded by: Digital bolívar Reason: continued hyperinflation Ratio: 1 digital bolívar = 1,000,000 sovereign bolívares

Sovereign bolívar
bolívar soberano (Spanish)

ISO 4217
- Code: VES
- Subunit: 0.01

Units of account
- Plural: bolívares
- Symbol: Bs. or Bs.S
- Nickname: bolo(s), luca(s), real(es)
- Subunit
- 1/100: céntimo

Denominations
- Banknotes: VES series: Bs.S 10,000, Bs.S 20,000, Bs.S 50,000, Bs.S 200,000, Bs.S 500,000, Bs.S 1,000,000

Demographics
- User(s): Venezuela

Issuance
- Central bank: Banco Central de Venezuela
- Website: www.bcv.org.ve

Valuation
- Inflation: ▲4,355-5,713% (2020)
- This infobox shows the latest status before this currency was rendered obsolete.

On 22 March 2018, Maduro announced a new monetary reform program, with a planned revaluation of the currency at a ratio of 1,000 to 1. The change was to be made effective from 4 June 2018.

In May 2018, the government required prices to be expressed in both hard bolívares and sovereign bolívares at the then-planned rate of 1,000 to 1. For example, one kilogram of pasta was shown with a price of Bs.F 695,000 and Bs.S 695. Prices expressed in the new currency were rounded to the nearest 50 céntimos, as that was expected to be the lowest denomination in circulation at launch. The rounding created difficulties because some items and sales qualities were priced at significantly less than Bs.S 0.50; for example a litre of gasoline and a Caracas Metro ticket typically cost Bs.S 0.06 and Bs.S 0.04, respectively.

President Nicolás Maduro announcing the redenomination of the Venezuelan bolívar on 17 August 2018.

The change in currency was originally scheduled for June 4, 2018. The President delayed the planned June launch date of the sovereign bolívar, citing from Aristides Maza, "the period established to carry out the conversion is not enough". The revaluation was rescheduled to 20 August 2018, and the rate changed to 100,000 to 1, with prices being required to be expressed at the new rate starting 1 August 2018.

On 20 August 2018, the Maduro government launched the new sovereign bolívar currency, with Bs.S 1 worth Bs.F 100,000. New coins in denominations of 50 céntimos and Bs.S 1, and new banknotes in denominations of Bs.S 2, Bs.S 5, Bs.S 10, Bs.S 20, Bs.S 50, Bs.S 100, Bs.S 200 and Bs.S 500 were introduced. Under the country's official fixed exchange rate to the US dollar the new currency was devalued by roughly 95% compared to the old hard bolívar. The day was declared a bank holiday to allow the banks to adjust to the new currency. Initially, during a transition period the sovereign bolívar was to be run alongside the hard bolívar. However, from the start of the transition, on 20 August, hard bolívar notes of Bs.F 500 and less could not be used, only deposited at banks.

Concurrently with the release of the new currency, the minimum wage was raised to Bs.S 1,800 per month, a 33-fold increase, and the standard value-added tax rate was hiked from 12% to 16%.

Additionally, the sovereign bolívar was supposed to have a fixed exchange rate to the petro cryptocurrency, with a rate of Bs.S 3,600 to one petro; a peg of petro and sovereign bolívar was announced by Maduro as early as August 2018. The petro was supposedly tied to the price of a barrel of oil (about US$60 in August 2018). As of the end of August 2018, there was no evidence that the cryptocurrency was being traded. Petro was regarded by many as a scam. On January 15, 2024, Petro was shut down and any remaining holdings were liquidated.

Following the introduction of the sovereign bolívar, inflation increased from 61,463% on 21 August 2018 to 65,320% on 22 August 2018. By 24 August 2018, the introduction of the sovereign bolívar had not prevented hyperinflation. According to inflation analyst Steve Hanke, between 18 August and 21 August 2018, the inflation rate increased from 48,760% to 65,320%. In October 2021, the country removed six zeroes from its currency while adapting a newer version of the bolivar currency system under a project known as Nueva Expresión Monetaria ("New Monetary Expression").

=== Digital bolívar ===
The bolívar digital, lit. "digital bolívar" was introduced on 1 October 2021 at a rate of Bs.S 1,000,000 to 1 digital bolívar. Since its announcement, the Central Bank has used the abbreviation "Bs." (i.e., not "Bs.D") in examples of prices marked in digital bolívares.

The digital bolívar did not immediately replace the sovereign bolívar, since sovereign bolívar banknotes continued to be accepted at a ratio of 1 million to 1. For example, the Bs.S 500,000 banknote is worth 0.50 digital bolívars, an amount which can also be referred to as 50 céntimos of a digital bolívar.

From October 1, 2021 through 27 April 2022, retailers were required to post prices in both sovereign and digital bolívars, By 2024, however, it was more common to see prices posted in "REF" (or "Ref", "ref", etc.), an abbreviation for the word referencia, representing a price in U.S. dollars, which customers can pay in digital and/or sovereign bolívars at the current exchange rate as published by the central bank.

In 2025, there has been a remarkable reversal in the dollarization of the economy outside tourist spots, with more than 80% of transactions in the country being made in bolívares. The stock of U.S. dollars in cash decreased from $8 billion in November 2024 to $5 billion as of April 2025. Depreciation of the currency resumed, with the official exchange rate surpassing 100 bolívares per U.S. dollar in June 2025, 200 per U.S. dollar in October of that year, and continued depreciating into 2026, reaching 900 per U.S. dollar in November 2026.

Due to a 52% depreciation of the bolívar against the U.S. dollar in the first half of 2026, the Central Bank of Venezuela sold over US$7.7 billion during that period as intervention to slow the depreciation of the national currency.

== Currency black market ==
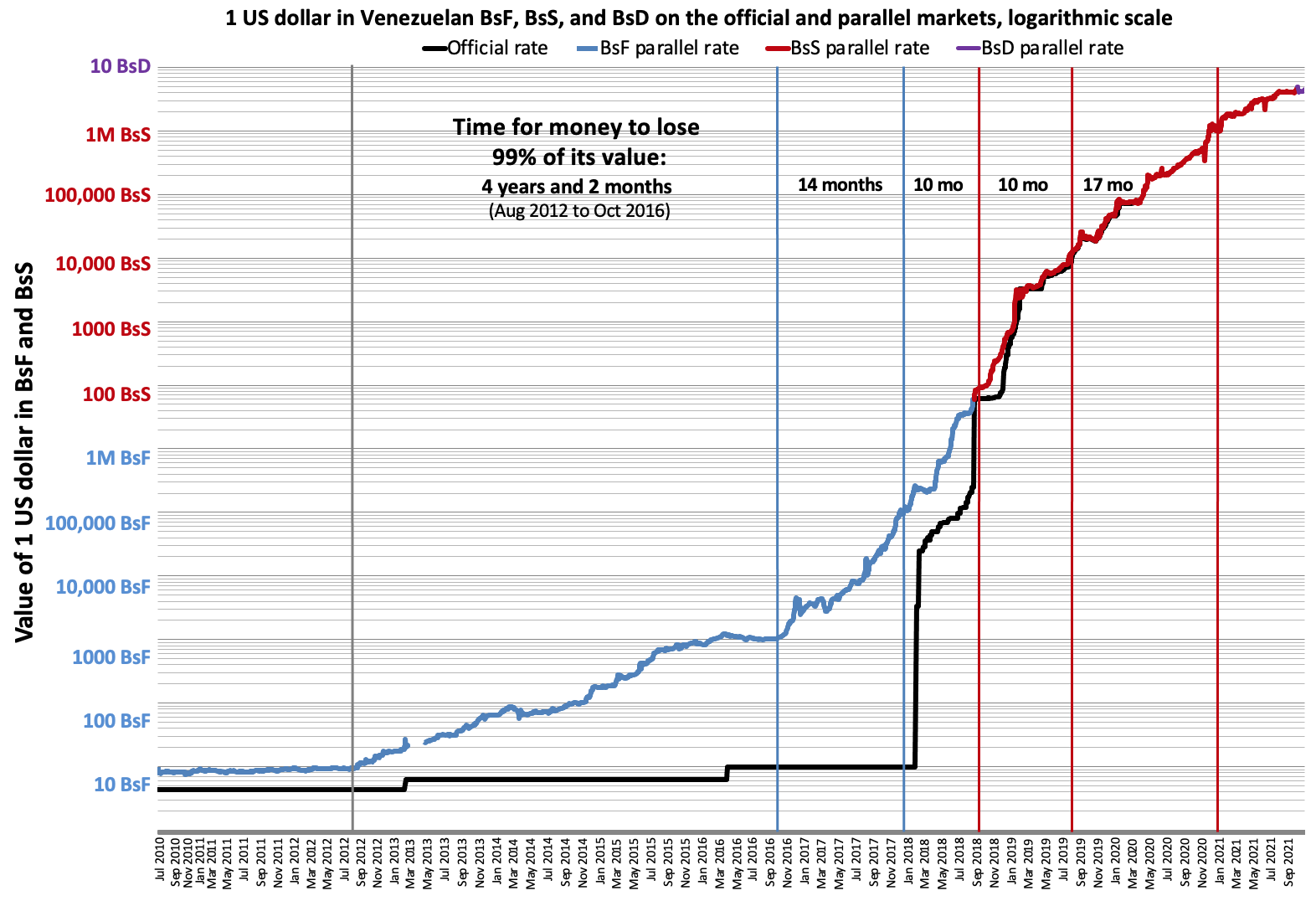
The value of one US dollar in Venezuelan hard bolívares (before 20 August 2018) and sovereign bolívares on the parallel (or black) market through time. Vertical lines represent every time the currency has lost 99% of its value, which has happened five times since 2012. The graph shows that as of October 2021, the currency is worth about 46 billion times less than it was worth in August 2012. Since the beginning of the presidential crisis in Venezuela in January 2019 and the relaxation of currency controls on May of that year, the curve has been less steep than previously, meaning that the rate at which the value is lost, inflation, has slowed down.

The black (or parallel) market value of the hard bolívar and the sovereign bolívar has been significantly lower than the fixed exchange rate and other rates set by the Venezuelan government (SICAD, SIMADI, DICOM). In November 2013, it was almost one-tenth that of the official fixed exchange rate of Bs.F 6.30 per US dollar. In September 2014, the currency black market rate for the hard bolívar reached 100 VEF/USD; on 25 February 2015, it went over 200 VEF/USD. on 7 May 2015, it was over 275 VEF/USD and on 22 September 2015, it was over 730 VEF/USD. Venezuela still had the highest inflation rate in the world in July 2015. By 3 February 2016, this rate reached 1,000 VEF/USD. This rate surpassed 4,300 VEF/USD on 10 December 2016. It surpassed 10,000 VEF/USD on 28 July 2017, and on 7 September 2017, the rate surpassed 20,000 VEF/USD for the first time. Inflation accelerated, and on 1 December 2017, it reached 100,000 VEF/USD for the first time ever. The rate surpassed 200,000 VEF/USD on 18 January 2018, then 500,000 VEF/USD on 16 April, 1 million VEF/USD on 30 May, 2 million VEF/USD on 7 June, and 5 million VEF/USD on 16 August.

At the time of redenomination on 20 August 2018, the exchange rate was 59.21 VES/USD. By the end of the month it reached 87 VES/USD. The rate then surpassed 100 VES/USD on 3 October 2018, 1,000 VES/USD on 9 January 2019, 10,000 VES/USD on 19 July, 100,000 VES/USD on 6 April 2020, and reached 1,000,000 VES/USD on 23 November 2020. According to DolarToday, the parallel exchange rate was 4,146,022 VES/USD as of 30 August 2021.

=== Exchange rate history ===
It is illegal to publish any unofficial exchange rates in Venezuela. One website that has been publishing parallel exchange rates since 2010 is DolarToday, which has also been critical of the Maduro and Delcy Rodriguez governments. This table shows a condensed history of the parallel foreign exchange rate of the Venezuelan bolívar (both hard and sovereign) to one United States dollar between 2012 and 2021, according to DolarToday.

Hard bolívar (Bs.F)
Bs.F 1 = Bs. 1,000
Sovereign bolívar (Bs.S)
Bs.S 1 = Bs.F 100,000

Month	Exchange rate
August 2012	10
February 2013	20
June 2013	30
September 2013	40
October 2013	50
November 2013	60
January 2014	70
February 2014	80
August 2014	90
September 2014	100
February 2015	200
May 2015	300–400
July 2015	500–600
September 2015	700–800
December 2015	900
February 2016	1,000
October 2016	1,500
November 2016	2,000–4,000

Month	Exchange rate
May 2017	5,000–6,000
June 2017	7,000–8,000
July 2017	8,000–11,000
August 2017	11,000–18,000
September 2017	18,000–29,000
October 2017	29,000–41,000
November 2017	41,000–97,000
December 2017	103,000–111,000
January 2018	111,000–236,000
February 2018	214,000–228,000
March 2018	213,000–236,000
April 2018	236,000–621,000
May 2018	621,000–1.3 million
June 2018	1.4–3.4 million
July 2018	3.4–3.6 million
August 2018	3.6–5.9 million

Month	Exchange rate
August 2018	59–87
September 2018	87–98
October 2018	99–240
November 2018	240–410
December 2018	410–730
January 2019	730–3,200
February 2019	2,400–3,700
March 2019	3,400–3,700
April 2019	3,700–6,100
May 2019	5,600–6,300
June 2019	6,300–7,900
July 2019	7,800–13,000
August 2019	13,000–26,000
September 2019	20,000–26,000
October 2019	19,000–26,000
November 2019	21,000–42,000
December 2019	40,000–55,000

Month	Exchange rate
January 2020	57,300–83,300
February 2020	74,800–77,100
March 2020	71,800–87,400
April 2020	89,200–200,000
May 2020	176,000–206,000
June	195,000–214,000
July 2020	205,000–268,000
August 2020	266,000–345,000
September 2020	346,000–452,000
October 2020	449,000–542,000
November 2020	524,000–950,000
December 2020	940,000–1.2 million
January 2021	1.0–1.8 million
February 2021	1.7–1.9 million
March 2021	1.8–2.1 million
April 2021	2.2–2.9 million
May 2021	2.8–3.2 million
June 2021	3.1–3.3 million
July 2021	3.3–4.1 million
August 2021	4.1–4.2 million

Monthly exchange rates of the U.S. dollar in digital bolívar since October 2021 View source data.

From October 2021 onward, with the introduction of the digital bolívar, the exchange rates shown below are according to those quoted by the Central Bank of Venezuela on the last official working day of each month.

Digital bolívar (Bs.); Bs. 1 = Bs.S 1,000,000
Year	Jan	Feb	Mar	Apr	May	Jun	Jul	Aug	Sep	Oct	Nov	Dec
2021	Sovereign bolívar was in use									4.39	4.61	4.59
2022	4.55	4.38	4.38	4.49	5.07	5.53	5.78	7.86	8.18	8.53	10.95	17.28
2023	21.95	24.36	24.50	24.73	26.16	27.85	29.51	32.51	34.30	35.13	35.49	35.93
2024	36.20	36.13	36.33	36.43	36.54	36.41	36.61	36.63	36.91	42.56	47.31	51.93
2025	57.97	64.25	69.57	86.85	96.86	107.62	124.51	147.08	177.61	223.65	245.67	298.14
2026	367.31	417.36	473.87	487.12	549.37	623.02	746.63	790.68	859.06	889.58		

In June 2025, over 50 people were arrested for illegal activities in the foreign exchange market, including the publication of unofficial exchange rates, which were often quoted at a premium to the BCV's exchange rate.

== Coins ==
=== Bolívar ===
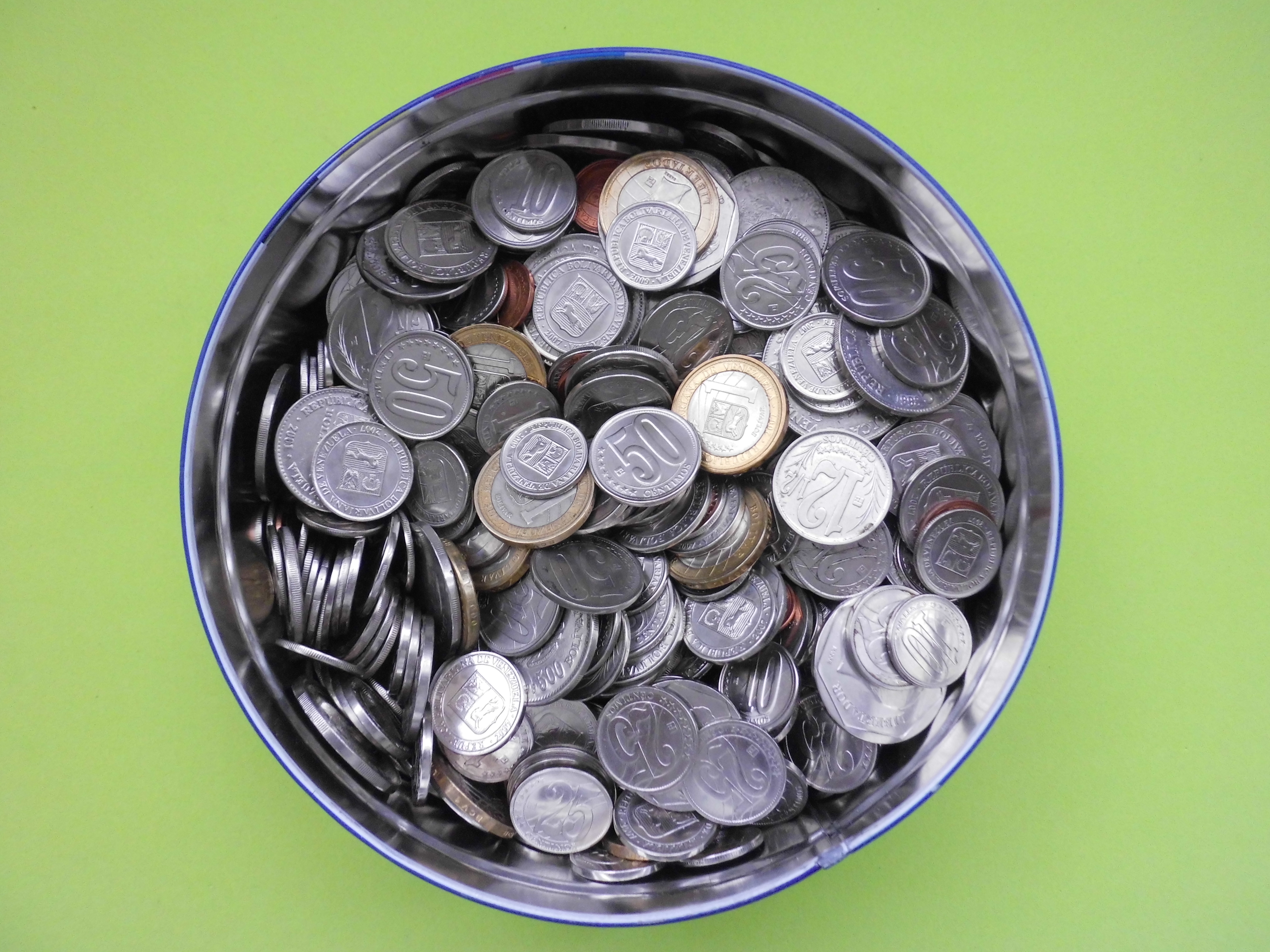
Various Venezuelan coins

In 1879, silver coins were introduced in denominations of Bs. 1/5, Bs. 1/2, Bs. 1, Bs. 2, and Bs. 5, together with gold Bs. 20. Gold Bs. 100 were also issued between 1886 and 1889. In 1894, silver Bs. 1/4 coins were introduced, followed by cupro-nickel 5 and 12 1/2 céntimos in 1896.

In 1912, production of gold coins ceased, whilst production of the Bs.5 ended in 1936. In 1965, nickel replaced silver in the 25 and 50 céntimos, with the same happening to the 1 and 2 bolívares in 1967. In 1971, cupro-nickel 10 céntimo coins were issued, the 12 1/2 céntimos having last been issued in 1958. A nickel Bs. 5 was introduced in 1973. Clad steel (first copper, then nickel and cupro-nickel) was used for the 5 céntimos from 1974. Nickel clad steel was introduced for all denominations from 25 céntimos up to 5 bolívares in 1989.

In 1998, after a period of high inflation, a new coinage was introduced in denominations of Bs. 10, Bs. 20, Bs. 50, Bs. 100 and Bs. 500.

The former coins were:

denomination:	Diameter:	Obverse and reverse:
bs.10	17 mm	
bs.20	20 mm	
bs.50	23 mm	
bs.100	25 mm	
bs.500	28,5 mm	
bs.1000	24 mm	

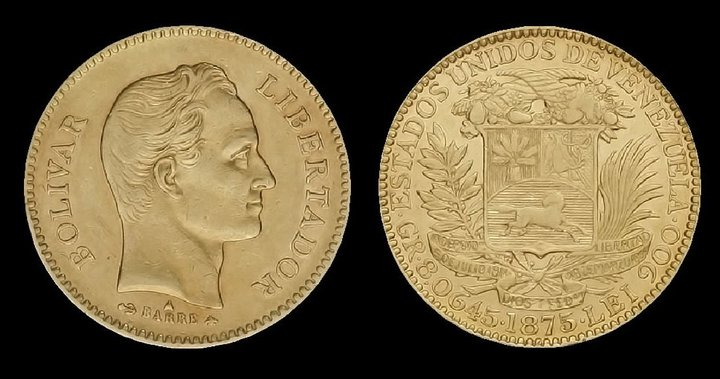
5-venezolano coin

All the coins had the same design. On the obverse the left profile of the Libertador Simón Bolívar is depicted, along with the inscription "Bolívar Libertador" within a heptagon, symbolizing the seven stars of the flag. On the reverse the coat of arms is depicted, circled by the official name of the country, with the date and the denomination below. In 2001, the reverse design was changed, putting the denomination of the coin at the right of the shield of the coat of arms, surrounded in a semicircle by the official name of the country and the year of its issue below.

=== Hard bolívar ===
Coins of the hard bolívar were in denominations of 1, 5, 10, 12 1/2, 25, 50 céntimos, and Bs.F 1. They were quickly rendered obsolete by high inflation. It may be noticed that there was a 12 1/2-céntimo coin and a 1-céntimo coin, but no 1/2-céntimo coin. Therefore, giving correct change for a purchase of, say, 4 1/2 céntimos would require using a 12 1/2-céntimo coin and getting 8 céntimos back. These coins were worthless by September 2014.

2008 Series
Denomination	Shape	Composition	Weight	Diameter	Edge	Obverse	Reverse	Obverse image	Reverse image
1 céntimo	Round	Copper-plated steel	1.36 g	15 mm	Reeded	Denomination of the coin, the eight stars and waves representing the patterns of the national flag	Coat of arms of Venezuela and the name of the country of emission		
5 céntimos	Round	Copper-plated steel	2.03 g	17 mm	Plain	Denomination of the coin, the eight stars and waves representing the patterns of the national flag	Coat of arms of Venezuela and the name of the country of emission		
10 céntimos	Round	Nickel-plated steel	2.62 g	18 mm	Reeded	Denomination of the coin, the eight stars and waves representing the patterns of the national flag	Coat of arms of Venezuela and the name of the country of emission		
12 1/2 céntimos	Round	Nickel-plated steel	3.93 g	23 mm	Plain	Denomination of the coin, the eight stars of the national flag and two palm branches	Coat of arms of Venezuela and the name of the country of emission		
25 céntimos	Round	Nickel-plated steel	3.86 g	20 mm	Plain	Denomination of the coin, the eight stars and waves representing the patterns of the national flag	Coat of arms of Venezuela and the name of the country of emission		
50 céntimos	Round	Nickel-plated steel	4.3 g	22 mm	Segmented (Plain and Reeded edges)	Denomination of the coin, the eight stars and waves representing the patterns of the national flag	Coat of arms of Venezuela and the name of the country of emission		
Bs.F 1	Round	Copper-Nickel center, Brass ring	8.04 g	24 mm	Smooth 'BCV1'	Effigy of the Liberator Simón Bolívar, waves representing the patterns of the national flag	Denomination of the coin, the eight stars and the waves representing the patterns of the national flag, the Coat of arms of Venezuela and the name of the country of emission		

In December 2016, it was announced that coins of Bs.F 10, Bs.F 50, and Bs.F 100 would enter circulation. These three coins would replace the banknotes of the same denominations. These three coins were worthless by July 2017.

2016 Series
Denomination	Shape	Composition	Weight	Diameter	Edge	Obverse	Reverse	Obverse & Reverse image
10 bolívares	Round	Nickel-plated steel	3.5 g	21.3 mm	Smooth	Effigy of the Liberator Simón Bolívar, waves representing the patterns of the national flag	Coat of arms of Venezuela and the name of the country of emission	
50 bolívares	Round	Nickel-plated steel	5.3 g	23.5 mm	Smooth	Effigy of the Liberator Simón Bolívar, waves representing the patterns of the national flag	Coat of arms of Venezuela and the name of the country of emission	
100 bolívares	Round	Nickel-plated steel	6.5 g	25.5 mm	Segmented (Plain and Reeded edges)	Effigy of the Liberator Simón Bolívar, waves representing the patterns of the national flag	Coat of arms of Venezuela and the name of the country of emission	

=== Sovereign bolívar ===
Sovereign bolívar coins were announced to be produced in denominations of 50 céntimos and Bs.S 1 (Bs.F 50,000 and Bs.F 100,000 respectively). These two coins were worthless by October 2018.

2018 Series
Denomination	Shape	Composition	Diameter	Edge	Obverse	Reverse	Obverse image	Reverse image
50 céntimos	Round	Nickel-plated steel	22 mm	Decorated	Effigy of the Liberator Simón Bolívar, the eight stars of the national flag	Coat of arms of Venezuela, waves representing the patterns of the national flag and the name of the country of emission		
1 bolívar	Round	Copper-Nickel center, Brass ring	24 mm	-	Effigy of the Liberator Simón Bolívar, the eight stars of the national flag	Coat of arms of Venezuela, waves representing the patterns of the national flag and the name of the country of emission		

=== Digital bolívar ===
Coins of the Digital bolívar were issued on October 1, 2021 in denominations of 25 and 50 céntimos and 1 bolívar. The coins were introduced along with the redenomination of the currency from the Sovereign bolívar to the Digital bolívar. These three coins were worthless by June 2025.

2021 Series
Denomination	Shape	Composition	Diameter	Edge	Obverse	Reverse	Issue	Obverse image	Reverse image
25 céntimos	Round	Nickel-plated steel	21.35 mm	Reeded	Effigy of the Liberator Simón Bolívar and eight stars from the national flag	Denomination and three bands representing the flag of Venezuela	1 October 2021		
50 céntimos	Round	Nickel-plated steel	23.5 mm	Segmented (Plain and Reeded sections)	Effigy of the Liberator Simón Bolívar and eight stars from the national flag	Denomination and three bands representing the flag of Venezuela	1 October 2021		
1 bolívar	Round	Nickel-plated steel	25.4 mm	Plain/Smooth	Effigy of the Liberator Simón Bolívar and eight stars from the national flag	Denomination and three bands representing the flag of Venezuela	1 October 2021		

== Banknotes ==
=== Bolívar ===
In 1940, the Banco Central de Venezuela began issuing paper money, introducing denominations of Bs. 10, Bs. 20, Bs. 50, Bs. 100 and Bs. 500. Bs. 5 notes were issued between 1966 and 1974, when they were replaced by coins. In 1989, notes for Bs. 1, Bs. 2 and Bs. 5 were issued.

As inflation took hold, higher denominations of banknotes started being introduced: Bs. 1,000 in 1991, Bs. 2,000 and Bs. 5,000 in 1994, and Bs. 10,000, Bs. 20,000 and Bs. 50,000 in 1998. The first Bs. 20,000 banknotes were made in a green color similar to the Bs. 2,000 banknotes, which caused confusion, and new banknotes were made in a new olive green color.

Starting from 2000, banknotes ranging from Bs. 5,000 to Bs. 50,000 were renamed to REPÚBLICA BOLIVARIANA DE VENEZUELA instead of BANCO CENTRAL DE VENEZUELA on the obverse, after the 1999 constitution was adopted. Moreover, banknotes of Bs. 10,000, Bs. 20,000 and Bs. 50,000 were updated in April 2006 after the National Assembly approved changes to the coat of arms, which were made official on March 12, 2006.

The following is a list of former Venezuelan bolívar banknotes:

Pre-1998 series banknotes (from various series)
Image	Denomination	Emission Year	Obverse	Reverse
	5 bolívares	1968	Simón Bolívar and Francisco de Miranda	National Pantheon of Venezuela
	10 bolívares	1968	Simón Bolívar and Antonio Jose de Sucre	Altar de la Patria, Campo de Carabobo
	20 bolívares	1971	José Antonio Páez	Altar de la Patria, Campo de Carabobo
	50 bolívares	1971	Andrés Bello	Palace of the Academies
	100 bolívares	1971	Simón Bolívar	Federal Legislative Palace
	500 bolívares	1981	Simón Bolívar	A branch of orchids
	1,000 bolívares	1991	Simón Bolívar	Signing of the Venezuelan Declaration of Independence
	2,000 bolívares	1994	Antonio José de Sucre	The Battle of Junín
	5,000 bolívares	1994	Simón Bolívar and his coat of arms	A reproduction of the painting El 19 de Abril de 1810 by Juan Lovera
1998 Series
	1,000 bolívares	1998	Simón Bolívar	A picture of National Pantheon in Caracas
	2,000 bolívares	1998	Andrés Bello	A picture of frailejones and a view of the Pico Bolívar
	10,000 bolívares	1998	Simón Bolívar	Teresa Carreño Cultural Complex, Caracas
	20,000 bolívares	1998	Simón Rodríguez and the Angel Falls in the background	A blue-and-yellow macaw and the Angel Falls
	50,000 bolívares	1998	José María Vargas	Central University of Venezuela, Caracas
2000 Series "REPÚBLICA BOLIVARIANA DE VENEZUELA"
	5,000 bolívares	2000	Francisco de Miranda	Picture of two angelfishes and a panorama of the Guri Dam
	10,000 bolívares	2000	Antonio José de Sucre	A Marpesia petreus butterfly and the Supreme Tribunal of Justice
	20,000 bolívares	2001	Simón Rodríguez and the Angel Falls in the background	A blue-and-yellow macaw and the Angel Falls
	50,000 bolívares	2005	José María Vargas	Central University of Venezuela, Caracas

=== Hard bolívar (bolívar fuerte, Bs.F, VEF) ===
==== 2008–2016 ("2007") ====
New banknotes of the series 2007–2015 with values of Bs.F 2 to Bs.F 100 were issued from 20 March 2007 until 5 November 2015 and became legal tender from 1 January 2008 to 20 August 2018. The greater the values, the longer re-issuing occurred. Only the Bs.F 50 and Bs.F 100 notes were re-issued in November 2015.

- Bs.F 2: March 20, 2007 to August 19, 2014
- Bs.F 5: March 20, 2007 to August 19, 2014
- Bs.F 10: March 20, 2007 to August 19, 2014
- Bs.F 20: March 20, 2007 to August 19, 2014
- Bs.F 50: March 20, 2007 to November 5, 2015
- Bs.F 100: March 20, 2007 to November 5, 2015

The obverse side is portrait-oriented, with the lower half carrying a portrait, while the reverse side is landscape-oriented, the left two thirds showing an animal in front of its habitat.

Re-issues retain the value-specific motifs, but the printing quality is different. The notes are printed by Casa de la Moneda Venezuela in Venezuela.

2008 Series - Hard Bolívars (Bs.F, VEF)
Image	Denomi- nation in Bs.F	Value in Bs. (1879-2007)	Approx. value in USD at launch (2008)	Value in USD at demonetization August 2018	Emission Year	Color	Size (mm)	Obverse	Reverse	Issue	Withdrawal
	Bs.F 2	2,000	$0.93	$0.00000033261; 1/6,018,869th of $1	2007	Blue and orange	156 × 69	Francisco de Miranda	Orinoco River Dolphins (Inia geoffrensis) with Coro Dunes in background; Gusano flower	1 January 2008	20 August 2018
	Bs.F 5	5,000	$2.33	$0.0000008315; 1/1,202,846th of $1	2007	Orange	156 × 69	Pedro Camejo	Giant armadillo (Priodontes maximus) with the Llanos plains in the background	1 January 2008	20 August 2018
	Bs.F 10	10,000	$4.66	$0.000001663; 1/601,885th of $1	2007	Brown and blue	156 × 69	Cacique Guaicaipuro	American harpy eagle (Harpia harpyja) with the Ucaima Falls at Canaima National Park in the background	1 January 2008	20 August 2018
	Bs.F 20	20,000	$9.32	$0.000003326; 1/300,942th of $1	2007	Pink	156 × 69	Luisa Cáceres de Arismendi	Hawksbill turtle (Eretmochelys imbricata) with Macanao Mountain in the background	1 January 2008	20 August 2018
	Bs.F 50	50,000	$23.30	$0.000008315; 1/120,285th of $1	2007	Green	156 × 69	Simón Rodríguez	Spectacled bear (Tremarctos ornatos) with Laguna Santo Cristo at Sierra Nevada National Park in the background	1 January 2008	20 August 2018
	Bs.F 100	100,000	$46.60	$0.00001663; 1/60,216th of $1	2007	Brown	156 × 69	Simón Bolívar	Red siskin (Carduelis cucullata) with Cerro El Ávila at El Ávila National Park in the background	1 January 2008	20 August 2018

==== 2016–17 ====
Venezuelans lining up at the Banco de Venezuela branch in Chacao to deposit the Bs.F 100 note after President Maduro withdrew it from circulation.

High inflation, which was a part of Venezuela's economic collapse, caused the hard bolívar's value to plummet. The Bs.F 2 and Bs.F 5 notes were no longer found in circulation due to the hyperinflation, but remained legal tender. By December 2016, the Bs.F 100 note, the largest denomination, was only worth about two U.S. cents on the black market.

On 7 December 2016, a new series of banknotes (recolors of the previous notes) in denominations of Bs.F 500, Bs.F 1,000, Bs.F 2,000, Bs.F 5,000, Bs.F 10,000, and Bs.F 20,000 were unveiled to the Venezuelan public. Days later on 11 December, President Nicolás Maduro, who had been ruling by decree, wrote into law that the Bs.F 100 would be pulled from circulation within 72 hours because "mafias" were allegedly storing those particular notes to "destabilize" the economy. With more than 6 billion Bs.F 100 notes issued consisting of 46% of Venezuela's issued currency, Maduro enacted an exchange for Venezuelan citizens to transfer all Bs.F 100 notes for Bs.F 100 coins while also blocking international travel, to prevent the return of the bolívares that were supposedly stockpiled. The government justified the move by claiming that the United States was working with crime syndicates to spirit away Venezuela's paper money to warehouses in Europe to cause the fall of the government. The government was thwarting this threat by withdrawing the notes from circulation. On 14 February 2017, Paraguayan authorities uncovered a 30-tonne stash of Bs.F 50 and Bs.F 100 notes totaling Bs.F 1.5 billion on its Brazilian border that had not yet been circulated. According to a United States Department of Defense adviser linked to The Pentagon, the Bs.F 1.5 billion was printed by Venezuela and destined for Bolivia, since unlike the implied exchange rate of thousands of hard bolívares equaling one United States dollar, the exchange rate was approximately 10 hard bolívares per dollar, making the value of the stash 419 times stronger, from US$358,000 to US$150 million. The Pentagon adviser further stated that the Venezuelan government tried to send the newly printed notes to be exchanged by the Bolivian government so Bolivia could pay 20% of its debt to Venezuela, and so Venezuela could use the US dollars for its own disposal.

On 3 November 2017, the Banco Central de Venezuela issued a Bs.F 100,000 note which is similar to the Bs.F 100 note of the 2007 series and the Bs.F 20,000 of the 2016 series, but with the denomination spelled out in full instead of adding an additional three zeros to the number 100. This denomination was worth US$2.42 using the unofficial exchange rate at the date of its release.

New banknotes of the 2016–17 series with values of Bs.F 500 to Bs.F 100,000 were issued from 7 December 2016 until 20 August 2018, the day when the sovereign bolívar was introduced. Notes from Bs.F 5,000 to Bs.F 100,000 were re-issued in December 2017.

- Bs.F 500: August 18, 2016 to March 23, 2017
- Bs.F 1,000: August 18, 2016 to March 23, 2017
- Bs.F 2,000: August 18, 2016
- Bs.F 5,000: August 18, 2016 to December 13, 2017
- Bs.F 10,000: August 18, 2016 to December 13, 2017
- Bs.F 20,000: August 18, 2016 to December 13, 2017
- Bs.F 100,000: September 7, 2017 to December 13, 2017,

Maduro announced that after the currency redenomination was carried out on 20 August 2018, these old denominations with a face value of 1,000 hard bolívares or higher would circulate in parallel with the new series of sovereign bolívar notes for a limited time. Banknotes with a face value below BsF. 1,000 were withdrawn from circulation and ceased to be legal tender on 20 August 2018. They had to be deposited in local banks.

	2016-17 Series - Sovereign Bolívars (Bs.F, VEF)							
Image	Denomination in Bs.F	Value in Bs.S 20 Aug - 4 Dec 2018	Emission Year	Color	Obverse	Reverse	Issue	Withdrawal
	Bs.F 500	None (demonetized)	2016	Grey	Francisco de Miranda	Orinoco River Dolphins (Inia geoffrensis) with Coro Dunes in background; Gusano flower	16 January 2017	20 August 2018
	Bs.F 1,000	Bs.S 0.01	2016	Purple	Pedro Camejo	Giant armadillo (Priodontes maximus) with the Llanos plains in the background	3 April 2017	5 December 2018
	Bs.F 2,000	Bs.S 0.02	2016	Brown	Cacique Guaicaipuro	American harpy eagle (Harpia harpyja) with the Ucaima Falls at Canaima National Park in the background	16 January 2017	5 December 2018
	Bs.F 5,000	Bs.S 0.05	2016	Green	Luisa Cáceres de Arismendi	Hawksbill turtle (Eretmochelys imbricata) with Macanao Mountain in the background	16 January 2017	5 December 2018
	Bs.F 10,000	Bs.S 0.10	2016	Blue	Simón Rodríguez	Spectacled bear (Tremarctos ornatos) with Laguna Santo Cristo at Sierra Nevada National Park in the background	16 January 2017	5 December 2018
	Bs.F 20,000	Bs.S 0.20	2016	Red	Simón Bolívar	Red siskin (Carduelis cucullata) with Cerro El Ávila at El Ávila National Park in the background	16 January 2017	5 December 2018
	Bs.F 100,000	Bs.S 1	2017	Yellow	Simón Bolívar	Red siskin (Carduelis cucullata) with Cerro El Ávila at El Ávila National Park in the background	2 November 2017	5 December 2018

==== 2018 ====
By May 2018, the hard bolívar's banknotes represented very little value, and had ended up in short supply, causing bolívares in cash to be valued at a premium relative to their face value. Weighing scales could no longer convert mass to price, and receipts could no longer fit the numbers on their paper.

In June 2018, seven months after its release, the value of the Bs.F 100,000 note (largest denomination), had its value reduced by 98%, from US$2.42 (in November 2017) to US$0.05, as a result of increasing hyperinflation.

The lower denomination hard bolívar banknotes (up to Bs.F 500) were demonetized on 20 August 2018, with the introduction of the sovereign bolívar. Higher denominations (Bs.F 1,000 and above) remained legal tender during a transition period. On 30 November 2018, it was announced that the remaining denominations of the old currency would be withdrawn from circulation and cease to be legal tender on 5 December 2018.

=== Sovereign bolívar ===
==== 2018 ====
On 22 March 2018, with a declared state of emergency, a redenomination of the currency was announced. The conversion from hard bolívar to sovereign bolívar banknotes officially occurred on 20 August 2018, with new denominations of Bs.S 2, Bs.S 5, Bs.S 10, Bs.S 20, Bs.S 50, Bs.S 100, Bs.S 200, and Bs.S 500. Four months after entry into circulation, shops and state banks began refusing the Bs.S 2, as its value had significantly declined since the redenomination. By November 2019, except for the Bs.S 500, all notes issued in 2018 were worthless.

Below is a list of denominations by their issuance dates:

- Bs.S 2, 5, 10, and 20: January 15, 2018
- Bs.S 200: January 15, 2018 to March 13, 2018
- Bs.S 50, 100 and 500: January 15, 2018 to May 18, 2018

2018 Series - Sovereign Bolívars (Bs.S, VES)
Image	Denomination in Bs.S	Value in Bs.F	Emission Year	Color	Obverse	Reverse	Issue	Withdrawal
	2 bolívares	200,000	2018	Green	Josefa Camejo	Yellow-crowned amazon parrot (Amazona ochrocephala) with the Morrocoy National Park in the background	20 August 2018	1 October 2021
	5 bolívares	500,000	2018	Orange	José Felix Ribas (portrait by Martín Tovar y Tovar)	Atelopus cruciger with the Henri Pittier National Park in the background	20 August 2018	1 October 2021
	10 bolívares	1,000,000	2018	Purple and orange	Rafael Urdaneta	Giant anteater (Myrmecophaga tridactyla) with the Catatumbo lightning in the background	20 August 2018	1 October 2021
	20 bolívares	2,000,000	2018	Blue	Simón Rodríguez	Jaguar (Panthera onca) with the Waraira Repano National Park in the background	20 August 2018	1 October 2021
	50 bolívares	5,000,000	2018	Orange	Antonio José de Sucre	Cunaguaro (Leopardus tigrinus) with the Península de Paria National Park in the background	20 August 2018	1 October 2021
	100 bolívares	10,000,000	2018	Purple	Ezequiel Zamora	Brown spider monkey (Ateles hybridus) with the Guatopo National Park in the background	20 August 2018	1 October 2021
	200 bolívares	20,000,000	2018	Blue-violet	Francisco de Miranda	Military macaw (Ara militaris) with the Waraira Repano National Park in the background	20 August 2018	1 October 2021
	500 bolívares	50,000,000	2018	Brown	Simón Bolívar	Venezuelan troupial (Icterus icterus) with the Macarao National Park in the background	20 August 2018	1 October 2021

==== 2019 ====
Further inflation since the soberano redenomination resulted in the creation of Bs.S 10,000, Bs.S 20,000 and Bs.S 50,000 banknotes in June 2019. Not mentioning inflation, the Central Bank of Venezuela said the introduction of the new banknotes would "complement and optimize" the monetary system and that their purpose was to make payment systems "more efficient". On 23 April 2020, the exchange rate per xe.com was US$1 = 144,697.34 VES; the following day, the rate slid to US$1 = Bs.S 171,140.42.

Banknotes with a narrow segmented security thread were printed by Goznak, but those with a wider one were printed elsewhere.

Banknotes of Bs. 10,000, Bs. 20,000, Bs. 50,000, and Bs. 200,000 of the sovereign bolívar ceased being legal tender on 25 September 2024.

2019 Series - Sovereign Bolívars (Bs.S, VES)
Image	Denomination in Bs.S	Value in Bs.D	Emission Year	Color	Obverse	Reverse	Issue	Withdrawal
	10,000 bolívares	0.01	2019	Blue	Simón Bolívar	"Mausoleum of the Liberator" Simón Bolívar	13 June 2019	25 September 2024
	20,000 bolívares	0.02	2019	Green	Simón Bolívar	"Mausoleum of the Liberator" Simón Bolívar	13 June 2019	25 September 2024
	50,000 bolívares	0.05	2019	Orange	Simón Bolívar	"Mausoleum of the Liberator" Simón Bolívar	13 June 2019	25 September 2024

==== 2020 ====
As of December 2020, the highest denomination banknote (Bs.S 50,000) was worth less than US$0.05 and the minimum wage was Bs.S 1,200,000 (about US$1) per month. By September 2020, all sovereign bolivar banknotes (Bs.S 2 to Bs.S 500) issued on 20 August 2018 were deemed worthless. Venezuelan officials planned a new Bs.S 100,000 note. Meanwhile, as of 16 December 2020, the exchange rate was over 1 million bolivares to one US dollar.

==== 2021 ====
On 5 March 2021, the Central Bank of Venezuela introduced 3 new denominations: Bs.S 200,000, Bs.S 500,000 and Bs.S 1,000,000, which were made available to the general public on 8 March 2021. The Bs.S 1,000,000 note was only worth US$0.52 total at the time of the announcement.

By late May 2021, the exchange rate had risen to over 3 million sovereign bolívares to one US dollar.

According to a July 2021 Bloomberg article, Venezuela planned to redenominate the bolívar at a ratio of 1,000,000:1 in August 2021, effectively removing six zeros from the denominations. The largest denomination banknote was 1,000,000 bolívares, expressed on the note with a predominant 1 followed by the descriptive millón de bolívares.

By June 2025, except for the Bs.S 200,000, withdrawn from circulation since September 2024, all notes issued in 2021 (Bs.S 500,000 and Bs.S 1,000,000) were worthless, but remain legal tender.

2021 Series - Sovereign Bolívars (Bs.S, VES)
Image	Denomination in Bs.S	Value in Bs.D	Emission Year	Color	Obverse	Reverse	Issue	Withdrawal
	200,000 bolívares	0.20	2020	Pale rose	Simón Bolívar	"Mausoleum of the Liberator" Simón Bolívar	8 March 2021	25 September 2024
	500,000 bolívares	0.50	2020	Purple	Simón Bolívar	"Mausoleum of the Liberator" Simón Bolívar	8 March 2021	current
	1,000,000 bolívares	1.00	2020	light blue and orange-brown	Simón Bolívar	Entrance to the Monument to the Motherland on Carabobo Fields; Battle of Carabobo	8 March 2021	current

=== Digital bolívar ===
Banknotes of 5, 10, 20, 50, and 100 digital bolívares were introduced in 2021, all bearing similar motifs, but different colors.

According to the Central Bank of Venezuela's data, banknotes of higher denominations did not actually start circulating until later, with only the 5 and 10 bolívar notes circulating at first, followed by the Bs. 20 in March 2022, and Bs. 50 and Bs. 100 in May 2022.

In August 2024, banknotes of 200 and 500 bolívares were introduced, distinguished from the lower denominations by having multiple portraits of Simón Bolívar.

Below is a list of denominations by their issuance dates:

- Bs. 5, 10, 20, 50 and 100: April 29, 2021.
- Bs. 200 and 500: August 16, 2023 to June 12, 2025.

2021 Series - Digital Bolívars (VED)
Image	Denomination	Emission year	Color	Obverse	Reverse	Number in circulation as of 30 April 2026	Issue
	5 bolívares	2021	Brown	Simón Bolívar	Entrance to the Monument to the Motherland on Carabobo Fields; Battle of Carabobo	80.52 million	1 October 2021
	10 bolívares	2021	Purple	Simón Bolívar	Entrance to the Monument to the Motherland on Carabobo Fields; Battle of Carabobo	199.99 million	1 October 2021
	20 bolívares	2021	Orange	Simón Bolívar	Entrance to the Monument to the Motherland on Carabobo Fields; Battle of Carabobo	334.34 million	1 October 2021
	50 bolívares	2021	Green	Simón Bolívar	Entrance to the Monument to the Motherland on Carabobo Fields; Battle of Carabobo	251.91 million	1 October 2021
	100 bolívares	2021	Red-violet	Simón Bolívar	Entrance to the Monument to the Motherland on Carabobo Fields; Battle of Carabobo	249.68 million	1 October 2021
	200 bolívares	2024	Purple/yellow	Three portraits of Simón Bolívar	Rafael Urdaneta bridge at Tablazo Strait outlet of Lake Maracaibo; Battle of Lake Maracaibo	55.21 million	16 August 2024
	500 bolívares	2024	Yellow/green	Three portraits of Simón Bolívar	Rafael Urdaneta bridge at Tablazo Strait outlet of Lake Maracaibo; Battle of Lake Maracaibo	37.62 million	16 August 2024

Current VES exchange rates
From Google Finance:	AUD CAD CHF CNY EUR GBP HKD JPY USD COP BRL MXN
From Yahoo! Finance:	AUD CAD CHF CNY EUR GBP HKD JPY USD COP BRL MXN
From XE.com:	AUD CAD CHF CNY EUR GBP HKD JPY USD COP BRL MXN
From OANDA:	AUD CAD CHF CNY EUR GBP HKD JPY USD COP BRL MXN

== See also ==
- Economy of Venezuela
- Hyperinflation in Venezuela
- SUCRE (currency)
