= Boca del Río =

Boca del Río may refer to:

- Boca del Río, Veracruz, Mexico
- Boca del Río, Nueva Esparta, Venezuela
