= Josefa Camejo =

Venezuelan independence heroine

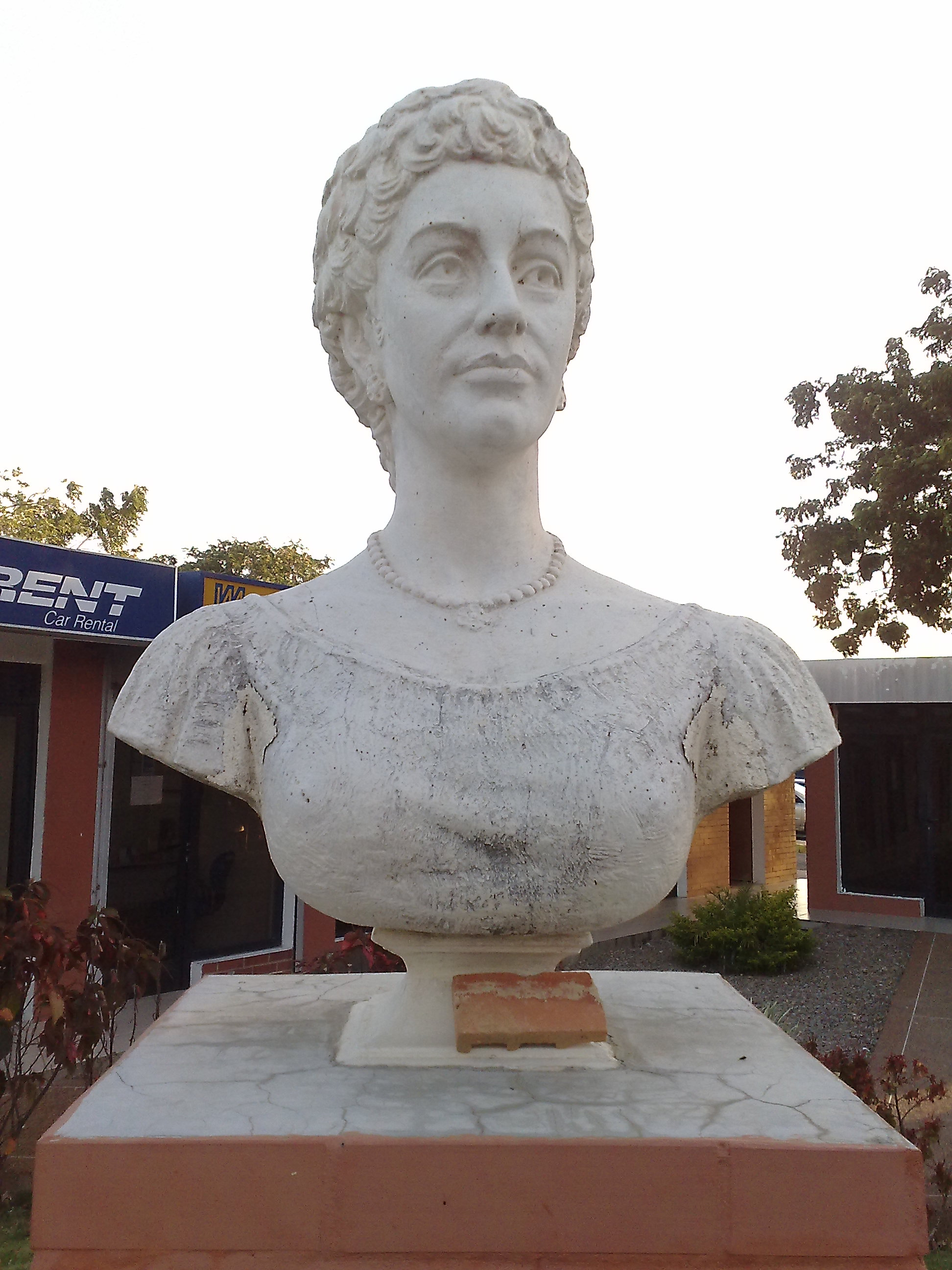
- Bust of Josefa Camejo in the Josefa Camejo International Airport
- Born: Josefa Venancia de la Encarnación Camejo; May 18, 1791; Paraguaná, Captaincy General of Venezuela
- Died: July 5, 1862 (aged 71); Ciudad Bolívar, Venezuela
- Other names: La Camejo; Doña Ignacia
- Occupation: Heroína de la Guerra de Independencia
- Spouse: Juan Nepomuceno Briceño Méndez
- Parents: Miguel Camejo (father); Sebastiana Talavera y Garcés (mother)
- Family: Mariano de Talavera y Garcés (uncle)

Josefa Venancia de la Encarnación Camejo (18 May 1791 – 5 July 1862) also known as La Camejo and Doña Ignacia, is recognized in the National Pantheon of Venezuela as one of the heroines of the Venezuelan War of Independence, supporting the patriotic cause.

== Biography ==
Camejo was born in a distinguished family, the daughter of Miguel Camejo and Sebastiana Talavera y Garcés, her parents were the owners of the estate where she lived, Aguaque.

She attended school in the city of Coro and then was sent by her parents to Caracas to continue her studies. There, she met the beginnings of independence of Venezuela, which occurred on April 19, 1810.

In 1811, at 20 years of age, Camejo moved to live with her mother in Barinas where her uncle monsignor Mariano de Talavera y Garcés, who was secretary of the Patriotic Society of Mérida and who had great influence on the education of his niece.

Before the offensive of the Royalists, and encouraged by her uncle, Camejo gathered a large group of women who wanted to participate in the armed struggle, and asked the governor of the Province, Pedro Briceño del Pumar, to have them for the fight, assuring him that:

«The female sex, Mr. Governor, does not fear the horrors of war, but rather, the outbreak of the cannon will only encourage, its fire will ignite the desire for freedom, which it will sustain at all costs in gift of the homeland […]»

In 1813, she married Juan Nepomuceno Briceño Méndez, who had to take refuge from the progress of the royalists moving to Bogotá, where her first son, Wenceslao, was born. Camejo was in charge of vacating Barinas, driving the entire caravan to her destination, although her mother drowned on the voyage. Pregnant, before the Ocumare del Tuy massacre, she moved to Bogotá where she remains until the battle of Boyacá in 1819, whose triumph allows her to return and meet with her husband. In 1820, her uncle Mariano ordered her to stop the Paraguaná insurrection, which she managed to reduce, disposing of weapons and defeating Royalist Chepito González in Baraived, achieving the incorporation of the Coro Province to national independence on May 3, 1821 and preparing the arrival of the General's Rafael Urdaneta's troops.

She returned to Barinas where her daughter and her husband, who was already very ill, died.

== Acknowledgments ==
- In 2002 during the International Women's Day, President Hugo Chávez held the ceremony of symbolic incorporation of Josefa Camejo to the National Pantheon.
- The international airport of Falcón, the state in which Josefa Camejo was born, bears her name Josefa Camejo International Airport
- In Coro, Falcón, the monument to the Venezuelan Federation highlights Josefa Camejo.
- In Pueblo Nuevo, Falcón state, there is Josefa Camejo Square
- Camejo was represented in 2018 currency of Venezuela in the 2 BsS bill.
