= Currency of Venezuela =

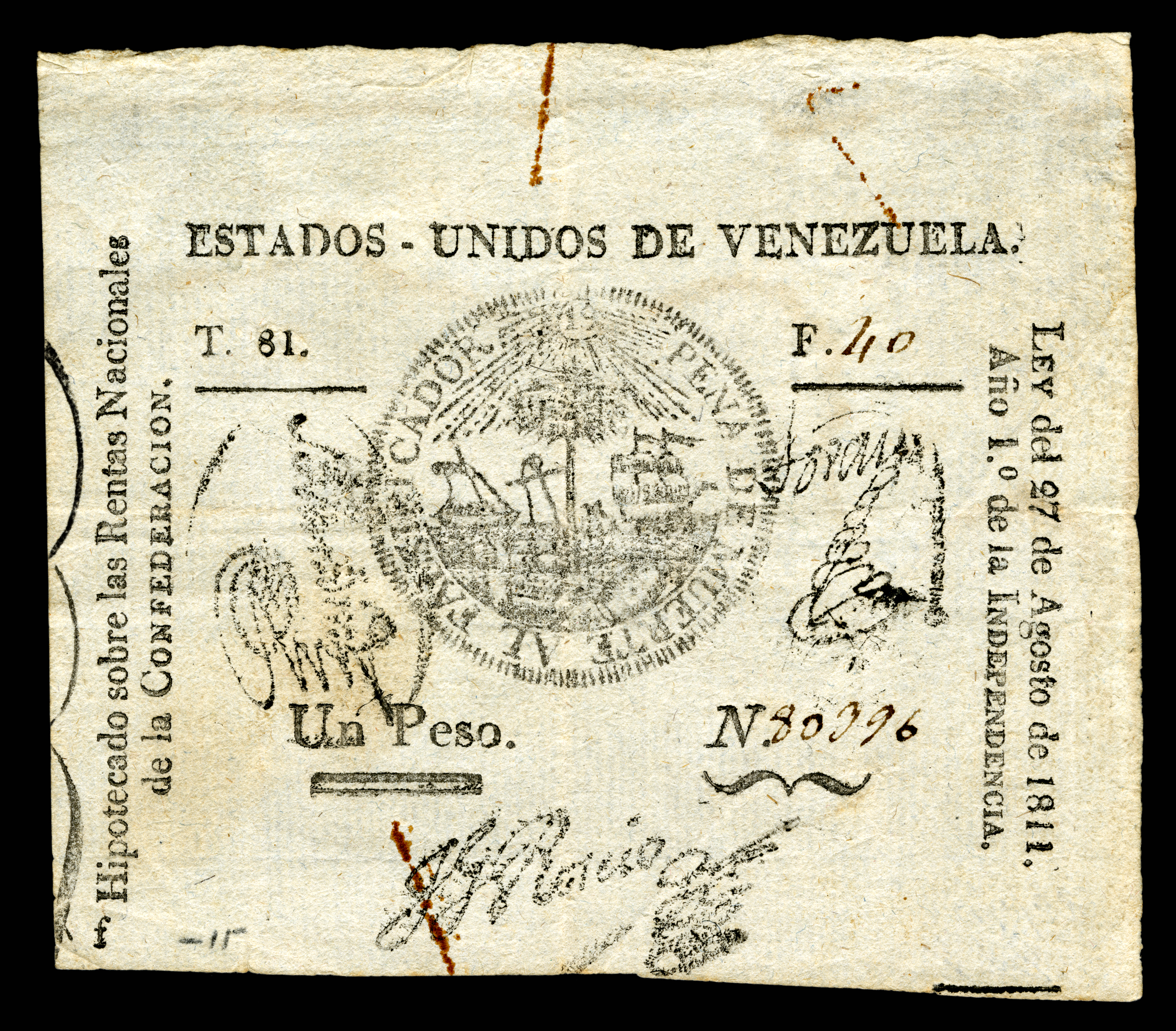
United States of Venezuela, 1 peso (1811), from the first issue of national paper currency.

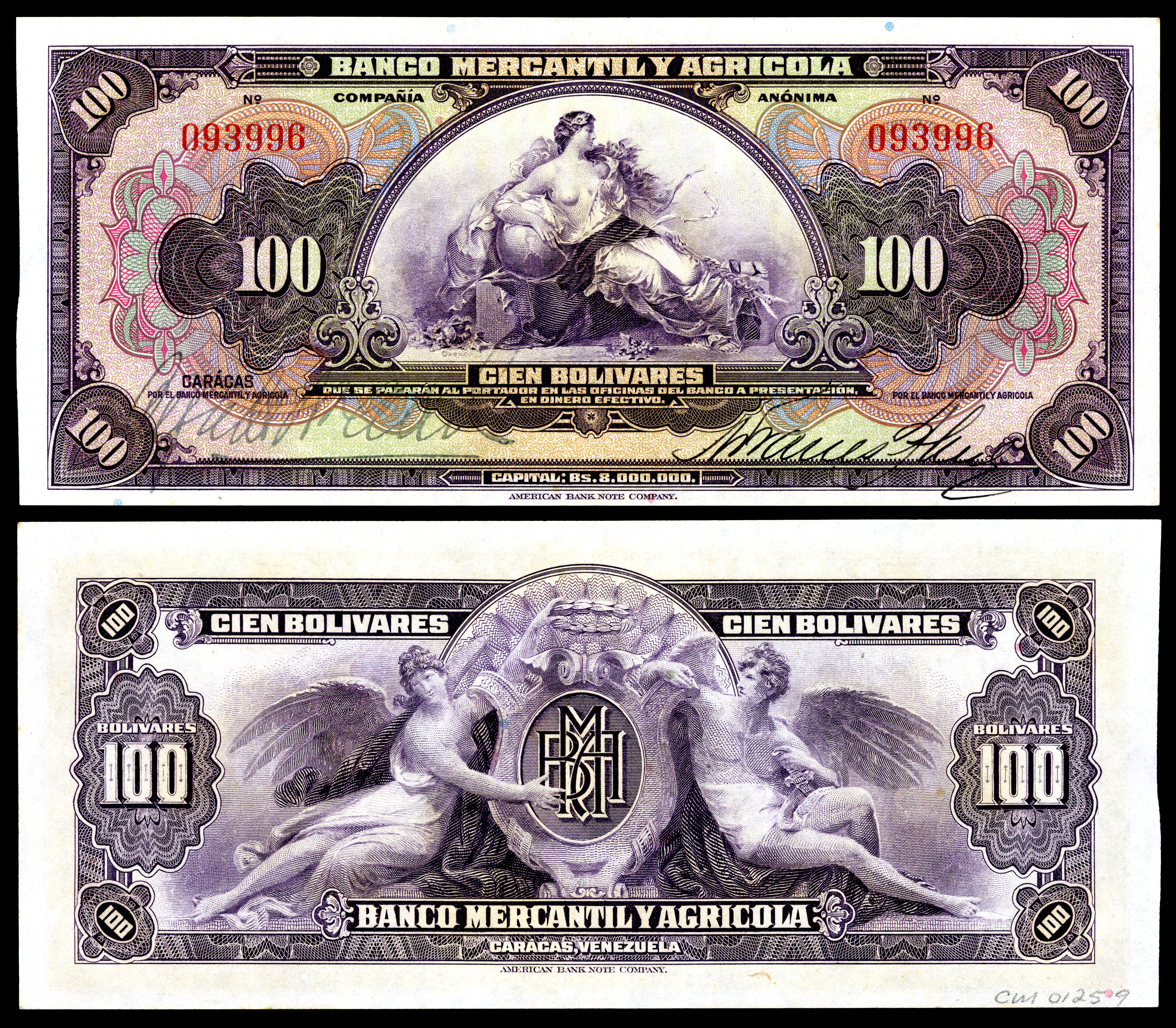
100 Bolivares, Banco Mercantil Y Agricola (1929).

The currency of Venezuela has been in circulation since the end of the 18th century. The present currency unit in Venezuela is the Venezuelan bolívar.

== Pre-independence currency ==
Peso = 8 Reales (silver)

Escudo = 2 Pesos (gold)

Venezuela shared the common Spanish-American monetary system, based on the silver peso and the gold escudo, which was used throughout Spanish America. Trade, especially in cacao, brought money to the colony in the late 17th century in the form of coin from the Mexico money supply, which increased significantly after the Compañía Guipuzcoana de Caracas obtained a trade monopoly in 1729, and Spanish and Spanish-American coin became a common form of payment. The prohibition on the circulation of American coin in Spain (May 4, 1754) resulted in coin from the Spanish mints returning to Spain. The Guipuzcoana Company then brought in a large quantity of cobs (macuquina) from the Lima, Potosí, and Mexico City mints. This cob coinage remained the coinage in circulation for many years, only disappearing in the first years of the Republic.

There was a special coinage for Venezuela in 1787. Claiming a shortage of circulating coin, Caracas petitioned for distinctive coins with an intrinsic value below standard that would only circulate locally. This request was granted by a royal ordinance of December 25, 1786. Another ordinance, February 3, 1787, authorized 200,000 pesos in coins only 60 percent of standard weight. These coins were minted at Mexico City and shipped on April 16. But some officials learned that the coins were not distinctive—they differed from regular coinage only in weight—and protested the issue, fearing they could be passed as regular coin. A royal ordinance of August 20, 1787 ordered the coins withdrawn and they were recalled and melted down in 1788.

The later 18th century was characterized by an inadequate money supply, and merchants used tokens (señas or fichas) to facilitate retail trade. By 1795 the use of tokens (made of iron, copper, or tin) was very widespread, but their unregulated issue and use was considered a problem. To deal with this situation, the Caracas Cabildo (council) authorized official copper tokens, and Venezuela's first mint opened at Caracas in November 1802.

=== Coin ===
==== 1787 lightweight coinage ====
Lightweight coinage for Venezuela, Mexico City mint:

- 1/2 real, 1.01 g
- 1 real, 20 mm, 2.02 g
- 2 reales, 4.05 g.

== 1810–1821 Struggle for independence ==
Peso = 8 Reales

Escudo = 2 Pesos

Inspired by the French assignats, Gen. Francisco de Miranda proposed an issue of paper money, which Congress approved August 27, 1811 in the amount of one million pesos. Congress also authorized (October 25) one million pesos in copper coin. The notes were put into circulation November 18, 1811 as a forced tender backed by national revenues. August 27, 1811 (released November 18): 1, 2 4, 8, and 16 pesos. A supplement of November 27, 1811 authorized 20,000 pesos in small cardboard notes of 2 reales. The peso notes were counterfeited extensively, so a second issue of new design was authorized February 7, 1812. A third issue, authorized December 31, 1812 appeared just before the royalists occupied Caracas. The royalists recovered as many notes as possible and had them burned in La Victoria.

macuquina-style copper dated 1812:

- 1/8r (7,000)
- 1/4r (30,000)

macuquina-style silver dated Año 2:

- medio (1/2r) (16,000)
- real (20,000)

=== Caracas - Royalist coinage ===
The royalists minted cob-style macuquina until 1817, then General Pablo Morillo had new-style coin inscribed "CARACAS" minted. This latter coin circulated widely; it was known as morillera in Venezuela and as caraqueña elsewhere.

copper dated 1813–1821:

- 1/8r (1814: 12,000; 1817: 4,500; 1818: 94,000)
- 1/4r (1813: 10,000; 1814: 40,000; 1816: 750,000; 1817, two types: 2.130 million; 1818: 2·240 million; 1821: 650,000)

silver dated 1817–1821:

- real, 0·588-0·709 fine, 19–20 mm, 2·45-3·25 g (1817: 6,500; 1818: 13,787; 1820: 10,729; 1821: 8,000)
- 2 reales, 0·555-0·898 fine, 4·50-5·80 g (1817: 76,000; 1818: 777,000; 1819: 1·450 million; 1820: 755,000; 1821: 110,000)
- 4 reales (1819: 18,000; 1820: 29,000)

=== Barinas ===
When republican forces under Gen. José Antonio Páez occupied Barinas, the city was overrun by refugees. In March 1817 at El Yagual, Páez asked that all silver be turned in. He then minted silver octagonal coins for the army at Caujaral and Achaguas. Bolívar did not favor this act and decreed that the coins should not circulate outside the province of Barinas.

- real, 0·183-0·434 fine, 0.900-2.400 g
- 2 reales, 0·402 fine (about 3,500 pieces)

=== Guayana ===
Royalist copper coinage was authorized for Guayana October 26, 1813, because the province was cut off from other Spanish forces:

- cuartillo or 1/4 real (1813)
- medio or 1/2 real (1813, 1814, 1815, 1816, 1817).

=== Maracaibo ===
Royalist copper:

- 1/8 (1813)
- 1/2 (1813)

silver:

- 2 reales (38, 181, 182, 1813, 1814).

=== Margarita ===
Republicans copper:

- 4 maravedis, 29 mm (1810).

== 1821–1830 Gran Colombia ==
1821–1830 Gran Colombia

Peso = 8 Reales (silver)

Onza = 16 Pesos (gold)

=== History ===
While Venezuela was federated with Nueva Granada (modern Colombia) and Quito (Ecuador) in Gran Colombia, 1821–1830, the monetary laws in force were those of Colombia.

Bolívar prohibited (June 20, 1821) the circulation of all copper coin and all post-1810 royalist coin that had not been counterstamped at Bogotá. Only milled coin (new or old) and the old Spanish macuquina were permitted to circulate.

Congress ordered all gold and silver coin minted in Gran Colombia to meet the old Spanish standards (Decree of September 29, 1821). Gold and silver were minted at Bogotá and Popayán, while the Caracas mint produced copper cuartillos (1/4 real) between July 14, 1821 and its closure on October 31, 1822. This copper coin was legal tender to one peso fuerte. Coins were inscribed REPÚBLICA DE COLOMBIA.

The monetary law of March 14, 1826 provided for a gold coinage based on the Colombian gold peso (peso colombiano de oro) of 1·797238 g, and a silver coinage based on the Colombian silver peso (peso colombiano de plata).

Bolívar's monetary law of November 6, 1828 confirmed the unrestricted circulation of macuquina, and the Department of Venezuela decreed (September 17, 1829) the obligatory acceptance of silver macuquina—a seller who refused legal macuquina being subject to a fine or imprisonment.

José Antonio Páez, who eventually came to lead the separatist movement in Venezuela, reopened the Caracas mint in 1829 and authorized a silver peseta (2 reales) and a copper cuartillo. The Caracas mint then closed for good (October 1830).

=== Coin (Caracas mint) ===
copper:

- cuartillo or 1/4 real, 14.38 g (1821, 1822; 1829, 1830)

silver:

- peseta or 2 reales (1829).

== 1830–1848 Peso fuerte (silver) ==
Peso (Peso sencillo) = 8 Reales = 100 Centavos or 80 Centavos fuertes

Peso fuerte = 10 Reales = 100 Centavos fuertes (from 1832)

=== History ===
The currency in 1830 was chaotic. Circulation consisted of old silver macuquina minted at Caracas under both royalists and republicans and of silver and gold coin from the various American states, especially from Colombia. Good quality silver coin tended to disappear from circulation (being used to pay for imports). Macuquina and worn coin remained to serve retail trade. The government published a table December 30, 1830 fixing the value of foreign coin in terms of local macuquina. On December 22, 1832, the Secretary of Finance ordered customs houses and finance offices to receive and pay out the silver peso fuerte as equivalent to 10 reales of silver macuquina. After this, peso or peso sencillo (current peso) indicated payment in macuquina; peso fuerte indicated payment in standard silver pesos.

On May 13, 1834 Congress gave legal tender status to: (1) the peso fuerte and onza de oro and their fractions, whether from Spain or one of the American republics, so long as they were of standard weight and fineness; (2) the peso fuerte (silver dollar) of the United States and its fractions; (3) the French franc; (4) the British shilling; and, (5) the pesos of Portugal and Brazil. A decree of June 26, 1834 ended the circulation of 1/4-real macuquina dated 1829–1830. Then on March 25, 1835 Congress authorized circulation of a hitherto unfamiliar coinage, copper centavos (cents) of the United States.

To replace macuquina, Congress authorized the government, May 2, 1840, to obtain French francs (and halves and quarters) and United States silver 5, 10, and 20-cent pieces and copper cents and half-cents. On March 23, 1841 Congress prohibited further circulation of any kind of macuquina, and macuquina was withdrawn and exchanged, 100,000 pesos in French coin being distributed to the provinces to facilitate this operation.

The monetary law of March 29, 1842 was based on the peso fuerte of 10 reales or 100 centavos. It provided for a national copper coinage (minted at London), which was legal tender for all debts public and private. When these coins were put into circulation, the legal tender status of copper cents (centavos) from the United States was revoked (October 12, 1844).

=== Paper ===
The first bank to issue paper money was the Banco Colonial Britanico, established July 29, 1839 with a capital of $300,000. It issued notes for 5, 10, 20, 50, and 100 pesos sencillos. It closed in 1849.

Banco Nacional de Venezuela was created by act of Congress, May 17, 1841, with a capital of 2.5 million pesos. It was authorized to issue notes for 5, 20, 100, and 500 pesos. The only notes known (as of 2002) are for 5 and 20 pesos, printed by New England Bank Note Co. of Boston. The bank terminated operations on March 23, 1850.

=== Coin ===
Copper centavos dated 1843, with liberty-head (obv), were produced at the Royal Mint, London:

- 1/4c, 19 mm, 3·00 g (3·84 million)
- 1/2c, 24 mm, 6·00 g (0·96 million)
- 1c, 32 mm, 12·10 g (0·48 million).

== 1848–1854 Franco (silver) ==
Franco = 2 Reales = 20 Centavos

Peso = 5 Francos = 10 Reales = 100 Centavos

=== History ===
The monetary law of March 30, 1848 established the French franc (franco frances), 5·00 g, 0·900 fine, as the monetary unit of Venezuela. No detailed explanation was provided—presumably, the new government wanted to make a clean break with the policies of the conservative oligarchy (Oligarquía Conservadora, 1830–1848) that it replaced. A table of coin ratings expressed in francos was published, and the Franco was declared equal to 20-centavos of the copper coins authorized between 1834 and 1842.

=== Coin ===
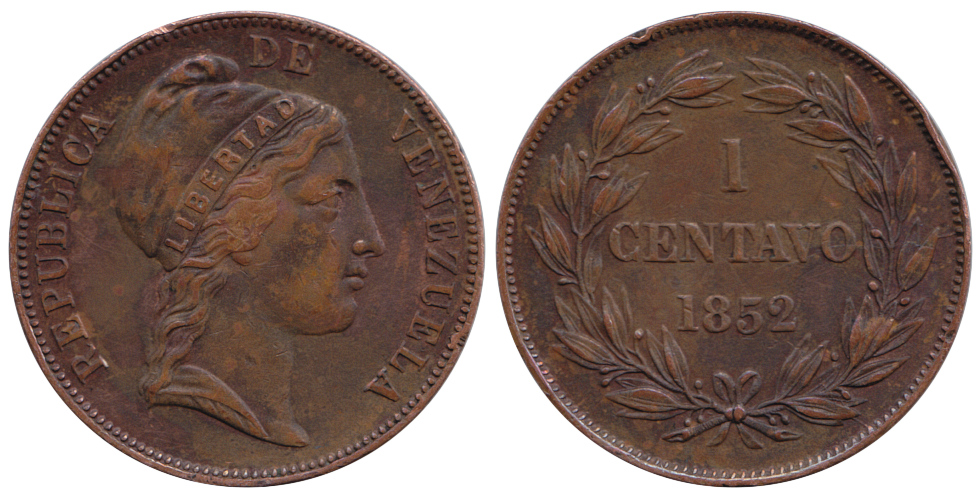
1 centavo 1852. Royal Mint, London.

Liberty-head copper centavos dated 1852 were minted at Birmingham and London.

Birmingham Mint Ltd.:

- 1/4c, 19 mm, 2·90 g (2 million)
- 1/2c, 24 mm, 5·70 g (0.5 million)
- 1c, 31·5 mm, 11·40 g (0·25 million).

Royal Mint, London:

- 1/4c, 16 mm, 2·70 g (4 million)
- 1/2c, 22 mm, 5·40 g (1 million)
- 1c, 30·5 mm, 10·90 g (0·5 million).

== 1854–1857 Venezolano (gold and silver) ==
Venezolano (Peso) = 10 Reales = 100 Centavos

Conversion: 1 venezolano = 5 francos

=== History ===
A new monetary law, April 1, 1854, provided for a mint in Caracas to produce a national coinage based on both gold and silver. The gold coins would be: onza, media onza, doblón (1/4 onza), escudo (1/8 onza), and venezolano de oro (1/16 onza or peso de oro). Silver coins were: peso fuerte or venezolano de plata, medio peso, peseta (1/4 peso), real (1/8 peso), and medio real (1/16 peso). Copper coins were to be the cuarto and octavo. The government was unable to establish the mint, and no coins were produced.

=== Paper ===
Compañía de Accionistas was formed December 4, 1855 with a capital of $600,000. It issued notes for 5 pesos sencillos and rendered services to the Treasury until it closed in March 1858.

== 1857–1865 Peso fuerte de oro (gold) ==
Peso fuerte de oro = 10 Reales = 100 Centavos

=== History ===
For want of a national mint, the 1854 monetary law had remained unimplemented, so Congress passed a new law (March 23, 1857) authorizing coinage abroad. The basic coin was to be the gold peso fuerte of 1·61290 g, 0·900 fine, accompanied by two multiples, a doblón (10 pesos fuertes) and an escudo (5 pesos fuertes). The silver coins, 0·900 fine, were: medio peso (5 reales), 11·50 g, 30 mm; peseta (2 reales), 4·60 g, 23 mm; real, 2·30 g, 18 mm; and, medio real, 1·15 g, 16 mm. There was also a centavo, 95% copper and 5% tin-zinc, 7·50 g, 25 mm. None of the gold coins were ever minted.

Following a series of provisional governments during the civil war of 1859–1861, the Guerra Larga, J.A. Páez was proclaimed dictator on September 10, 1861. Páez authorized coins with his own effigy and a contract was signed with the Paris Mint, (April 29, 1862), but he was overthrown by a revolt before the coins were shipped from Paris.

Postage stamps came into use January 1, 1859 in denominations of 1/2, 1, and 2 reales. Newspaper stamps of 1/2 and 1 centavo fuerte appeared in March 1862.

=== Paper ===
==== 1859–1861 public debt certificates ====
The government (República de Venezuela) issued certificates on the public debt (deuda pública) that were legal tender and payable to bearer. Many of these issues bore the signatures of respected merchants. Certificates for 8 reales and for 5, 10, 20, 50, and 100 pesos were issued under various decrees, the first on October 20, 1859 and the last on January 15, 1861. There were separate issues for Caracas, Carabobo, and Aragua.

==== 1861–1862 Banco de Venezuela ====
Banco de Venezuela was in operation from November 1, 1861 until November 30, 1862. It was established by the Páez government with a credit from the Treasury, and a capital of $4 million. It was commonly known as "Banco de la Dictadura". It issued promissory notes (vales) of 5 and 50 pesos dated February 1, 1862.

==== 1862 Junta de Recursos ====
The Junta de Recursos issued notes for 8 reales (one peso sencillo) dated March 1, 1862.

=== Coin ===
==== 1858–1862 liberty head ====
Copper (Birmingham mint) dated 1858–1863:

- 1c, 25 mm, 7·50 g (2 million 1858, 1·5 million 1862, 0·5 million 1863).

Silver 0·900 fine (Paris mint) dated 1858:

- 1/2r (medio), 14.5 mm, 1·150 g (40,270 pieces), inscribed "1½" in error!
- 1r (real), 17.5 mm, 2·300 g (42,698 pieces)
- 2r (peseta), 23 mm, 4·600 g (29,990 pieces)
- 5r (bamba), 30 mm, 11·500 g (26,120 pieces).

==== 1863 J.A. Páez ====
The contract with the Paris Mint for coins with the bust of Gen. Páez, finalized November 7, 1862 was rescinded in June 1863, and coins already minted were melted down. Copper 1 and 2 céntesimos, and silver 1/2, 1, 2, 4, and 10 reales had been ordered. About 200 pieces of the 10-reales, 38 mm, 10·000 g, are thought to have survived.

== 1865–1871 Venezolano de oro (gold) ==
Peso fuerte (Venezolano de oro) = 10 Reales (Décimos) = 100 Centavos

=== History ===
The monetary law of June 12, 1865 was based on the gold venezolano (peso fuerte). It provided for a mint and for a coinage with the bust of Bolívar, the Libertador. Proposed gold coins 0·900 fine were: a peso fuerte or Venezolano de oro (10 reales) of 1·612 g, and its multiples, an escudo (5 pesos fuertes), a doblón (10 pesos fuertes), and a doble-doblón (20 pesos fuertes). Subsidiary silver coins 0·800 fine were to be a medio peso (5 reales) of 12·50 g, a peseta (2 reales) of 5·00 g, a real of 2·50 g, and a medio real of 1·25 g. There would be a copper centavo of 8·00 g. The need for a uniform national coinage was great, but the economic situation was unfavorable and it proved impossible to erect a mint at this time. Foreign coins were given new ratings.

The currency in circulation was generally in poor condition, and larger sums were weighed rather than counted. A decree of December 3, 1870 ordered all coins accepted by tale, no matter what their condition, but sellers either continued to weigh coins or else they raised prices.

=== Paper ===
==== 1865 private bank notes ====
El Banco de Londres y Venezuela, Limitado was established at Caracas January 1, 1865 with a capital of £500,000 sterling. It was liquidated in 1867. It issued notes for "5 pesos sencillos" (face, Spanish) or "5 dollars currency" (back, English), dated January 23, 1865.

==== 1869 treasury notes ====
Treasury issued notes (billetes de Tesoreria) for 5 pesos under an authorization of January 19, 1869.

== 1871–1879 Venezolano (gold and silver) ==
Venezolano = 100 Centavos (Céntimos, Centésimos)
Conversion: 1 venezolano = 1 fuerte (peso fuerte)

=== History ===
On March 29, 1871, all coin in circulation, whatever its condition, was declared legal tender so long as one of the two sides was clearly legible, A monetary law of May 11 then established the venezolano of 100 centavos as money of account and adopted the Latin Monetary Union system, based on the silver fuerte (venezolano de plata) of 25·000 g, 0·900 fine, and the gold venezolano of 1·6129 g, 0·900 fine. The 20-venezolano gold piece was named the Bolívar. Coins were ordered from Paris; foreign coin was to remain in circulation until they arrived. New ratings were published July 2. From January 1, 1872 all accounts had to be converted and expressed in venezolanos and centavos.

On February 13, 1874 the circulation of coin worn on both sides was prohibited and a new table of ratings for foreign coin was published. When the coinage of 1873–1874 was released, the circulation of all mutilated and worn coin was prohibited (Resolution of June 18, 1874). Worn coin was withdrawn and sent to Paris to be reminted. The export of national gold coin was prohibited May 3, 1875, and the import of foreign silver coin was prohibited June 28, 1876.

Postage stamps for 1, 5, 10, 30, 50, 90 céntimos or centésimos and for 1, 3, and 5 venezolanos appeared in 1879.

=== Paper ===
Compañia de Crédito was created December 9, 1870 by Gen. Antonio Guzmán Blanco. It was privately owned with minority government participation, created in order to pay off outstanding government debts. Guzmán increased central government power by virtually privatizing customs collection through this institution. It issued notes to bearer for 5, 10, 50, and 100 venezolanos until it was liquidated in July 1876.

Banco de Caracas was founded in July 1876, reorganized on August 11, 1877, and dissolved on March 27, 1881. It issued notes for 5, 20, and 100 venezolanos.

The province of Guayana (Estado de Guayana) issued local notes in 1878–1880 for 50 centésimos and 1, 2, 4, and 8 venezolanos.

=== Coin ===
The government ordered subsidiary silver coins of 5, 10, 20, and 50 centésimos de venezolano from Paris, June 11, 1873. The inscription on Venezuelan coinage was changed to "Estados Unidos de Venezuela" (from "República de Venezuela"). Désiré-Albert Barre engraved the dies. An order for gold coins was placed, September 16, 1874, originally for 1, 5, 10, and 20 venezolanos. This order was subsequently replaced by one for a silver 1 venezolano and a gold 5 venezolanos.

The coinage of 1858 had been very limited. The coinage of 1873–1877 marked the establishment of a true, modern national coinage.

On June 14, 1876, the Minister of Finance ordered coins of 75% copper and 25% nickel for 1 and 2½ centésimos de venezolano from the United States to replace copper centavos. They were minted at Philadelphia.

== 1879–1887 Bolívar (silver) ==
Bolívar (Bs.) = 100 Céntimos

Conversion: 5 bolívares = 1 venezolano (peso fuerte); 1 bolívar = 20 centavos (de venezolano)

=== History ===
Gen. Guzmán Blanco returned to power on February 26, 1879 and immediately continued with his 1871 program to replace foreign coin in circulation by a National coinage. His monetary law of March 31, 1879 was based on the principles of the Latin Monetary Union. The basic monetary unit was the bolívar de plata, obligatory from July 1, 1879. Copper was eliminated completely, replaced by cupronickel. A coinage limit of Bs.6 per head was set.

Coins produced in Brussels and dated 1879 were put into circulation between November 1879 and October 1880. Postage stamps appeared January 1, 1880 in denominations of 5, 10, 25, and 50 céntimos and 1, 2, 5, 10, 20, and 25 bolívares.

A modern, national mint was finally inaugurated at Caracas on October 16, 1886. The import of foreign coin was then prohibited. Foreign silver was withdrawn from circulation and recoined.

=== Paper ===
Banco Comercial was established at Caracas July 20, 1882 and began operations August 1883, issuing notes for 20, 50, 100, 500, and 1000 bolívares. Banco de Carabobo was established in December 1883 at Valencia by Domingo Olvararría, issuing notes for 20, 30, 100, and 500 bolívares. In 1890, Banco Comercial was reorganized as Banco de Venezuela, which then bought out Banco de Carabobo.

Banco de Maracaibo was founded July 20, 1882 by the Sociedad de Mutuo Auxilio de Maracaibo as a merchant bank without any links to the government. It began issuing notes in 1883 for 20, 50, 100 bolívares, adding a 400 in 1917. It issued notes of a new design for 20, 100, and 500 bolívares in 1926, and continued until the notes of private banks were abolished in 1940.

=== Coin ===
Bolívar Silver and Gold Coins Dated 1879–1889 (by year in millions of pieces, approximate)
Bs.	0.20	0.50	1	2	5	20
type:	1879	1879	1879	1879	1879	1879
name:	-----	real	peseta	-----	fuerte	-----
	AR ·835	AR ·835	AR ·835	AR ·835	AR ·900	AV ·900
grams	1·000	2·500	5·000	10·000	25·000	6·4516
mm:	16	18	23	27	37	21
	Brussels mint
1879	0·125	0·200	0·375	0·375	0·250	0·041
1880						0·084
	Caracas mint
1886		0·300	0·600	0·240	0·470	0·023
1887		0·310	0·780	0·200	0·820	0·1325
1888		0·230	0·197	0·141	0·281	0·080
1889		0·080	0·118	0·111	0·329

When the 1/4 bolívar (0.25) was issued in 1894, the 1/5 (0.20) was recalled and many were melted down.

The 5 bolívares dated 1879–1889 has "28 DE MARZO DE 1864" in the ribbon (reverse).

The 1/2, 1, 2, and 5 of Type 1879 continued to be minted until 1936. The gold 20 was last minted in 1912.

== 1887–1930 Bolívar (gold) ==
Bolívar (Bs.) = 100 Céntimos

=== History ===
The monetary law of June 2, 1887 made gold an unlimited legal tender. Full-bodied silver (i.e., 0·900 fine) was legal tender to 500 bolívares, subsidiary silver (0·835 fine) to 50 bolívares, and nickel and copper to 20 bolívares. The bolívar was defined as equal to the gold franc or peseta, 290·322 mg fine gold (par: 5·18 per US dollar and 25·22 per pound sterling). The gold standard came into full operation in 1910.

The decade (1888–1899) after the fall of Guzmán Blanco was one of civil strife that exhausted the national treasury. The urgent need for small change in 1893 was met by ordering small denomination silver from Paris and then nickel coins from Berlin. The coins ordered from Berlin, May 25, 1896, were the same type, diameter, and weight as those of 1876–1877, only the denomination differing, the new 5 céntimos being equal to the old centavo (and it was often called a centavo).

Restrictions were placed on gold export in 1914, but banknotes never ceased being convertible into gold domestically. After war began, the exchange rate on New York depreciated slightly, but soon went to a premium. In April 1918 the US dollar cost only 4·32 bolívares. The monetary law of June 24, 1918 confirmed the bolívar de oro as equal to 290·323 mg fine gold. The exchange rate continued moving up and down, and did not stabilize until January 1924, after which the exchange rate remained around par.

=== Paper ===
Banco de Venezuela Sociedad Anónima was reorganized from Banco Comercial, absorbing Banco de Carabobo. It began operations August 18, 1890. As the government's main creditor, it wielded considerable economic and political power. It issued a large volume of notes that gained national acceptance, Its 1890 notes were for 20, 40, 100, 500, and 1000 bolívares. A 50 was added in 1897 and the colors of the other denominations were changed. New designs of the 10, 100, and 500 appeared in 1907, with a new 1000 in 1926. The bank ceased issuing in 1940.

Various commercial groups led by H.L. Boulton y Cía created a rival bank, Banco Caracas (unrelated to previous banks of that name), which issued notes from 1893 until 1940 in denominations of 20, 100, 400, and 800 bolívares, with a 10 added in 1914.

Banco Comercial de Maracaibo began issuing in 1916, Banco Venezolano de Crédito in 1925, and Banco Mercantil y Agricola in 1926. All three of these banks issued notes for 10, 20, and 100 bolívares until 1940.

=== Coin ===
Bolívar coins dated 1893–1938:

Cupronickel dated 1896 (Berlin) and 1915–1938 (Philadelphia):

- 5c, 19 mm, 2·500 g (1896, 1915, 1921, 1925, 1927, 1929, 1936, 1938);
- 12½c, 23 mm, 5·000 g (1896, 1925, 1927, 1929, 1936, 1938)

Silver 0·835 fine:

- 25c, type 1894, 16 mm, 1·250 g (1894, 1900, 1903)
- 50c, type 1879, 18 mm, 2·500 g (1893, 1900, 1901, 1903, 1911, 1912, 1919, 1921, 1924, 1926, 1929, 1935, 1936)
- Bs. 1, type 1879, 23 mm, 5·000 g (1893, 1900, 1901, 1903, 1911, 1912, 1919, 1921, 1924, 1929, 1935, 1936)
- Bs. 2, type 1879, 27 mm, 10·050 g (1894, 1900, 1902, 1903, 1904, 1905, 1911, 1912, 1913, 1919, 1922, 1924, 1926, 1929, 1930, 1935, 1936)
- Bs. 5, type 1893 with "13 de Abril de 1864" in ribbon (reverse), 37 mm, 25·000 g (1900, 1901, 1902, 1903, 1904, 1905, 1910, 1911, 1912,1919, 1921, 1924, 1926, 1929, 1935, 1936)

Gold 0·900 fine:

- Bs. 20, type 1879, 21 mm, 6·4516 g (1904, 1905, 1910, 1911, 1912).

Gold 0·900 fine, new (depreciated) standard:

- Bs. 10, type 1930, 19 mm, 2·2258 g (0·5 million 1930).

== 1930–2008 Bolívar (paper) ==
Bolívar = 100 Céntimos

=== History ===
The bolívar went off the gold standard in 1930. In August 1934 the official rate was fixed in terms of the US dollar at 3·915 bolívares per, adjusted to 3·18 per April 27, 1937. Gold coin disappeared from circulation.

Banco Central de Venezuela was created by Congress on July 13, 1939 (effective September 8). It began operations in October 1940, at which time there were six note-issuing banks (Banco de Maracaibo, Banco de Venezuela, Banco Caracas, Banco Comercial de Maracaibo, Banco Venezolano de Credito, and Banco Mercantil y Agricola). The notes of the private banks were withdrawn during 1941 (monetary law of July 22, 1941).

A system of multiple exchange rates was adopted July 23, 1942, with an official rate of 3·35 per US$1, which became its parity with the International Monetary Fund in 1947. A system of multiple exchange rates was adopted in 1948, the rates ranging from 3·09 to 4·80 per US dollar, and there was a black market. The black market reached a low of 4·98/US$1 in May 1961. IMF parity was revised to 4·45 per US dollar January 18, 1964.

The various monetary laws from July 12, 1945 on continued to define the monetary unit as the gold bolívar (bolívar de oro) of 290.323 mg pure gold. It was only October 30, 1974 that the monetary unit was defined simply as "bolívar", with no reference to gold.

The bolívar was a very stable currency for a decade after 1964, but by the early 1980s it was in serious trouble. A peg to the US dollar at 14·50 bolívares did not halt the slide. Neither peg, nor crawling peg, nor managed float could keep the bolívar exchange rate under control. It went from 47 per dollar in 1990 to 177 in 1995, to 680 in 2000, and to 2090 in 2005.

=== Paper ===
Banco Central de Venezuela released its first notes in December 1940, 50, 100, and 500 bolívares, printed by American Bank Note Company. A 20 was added in 1941 and a 10 in 1945.

Notes of a new design by Thomas de la Rue for 10, 20, 50, and 100 bolívares appeared in 1952, but the rather crude portrait of Bolívar was so unpopular that the bank returned to the 1940 design (but with the newer national arms).

Thomas de la Rue redesigned the portrait on its notes and these began appearing in circulation in 1960. Eventually there were five denominations: 5, 10, 20, 50, and 100.

Banco Central released a 5-bolívares note (authorized May 10, 1966) commemorating the 400th anniversary of the founding of Caracas in 1567.

Beginning in 1971, Banco Central began releasing notes of a more modern, non-traditional design in denominations of 10, 20, 50, 100, and 500 bolívares, printed by different printers. There were several minor design modifications between 1971 and 1980, and higher denominations were added: a 1000 in November 1991, a 2000 and a 5000 in September 1995, and a 10,000 in 1998. Meanwhile, three commemorative notes were released: a 100 in 1980 for the 150th anniversary of Simón Bolívar's death, a 50 in 1981 for the 200th anniversary of the birth of Andrés Bello, and a 20 in 1987 for the 200th anniversary of the birth of Rafael Urdaneta.

When the value of the metal in nickel-alloy coins exceeded face value, the coins began disappearing (and were completely gone by the time the metal was worth more than twice face in 1989). The severe shortage of change that resulted was met by issuing bank notes for 1, 2, and 5 bolívares.

The change in official name to República Bolivariana de Venezuela resulted in a change in the text on bank notes. Denominations with the new name were the 1000, 2000, 5000, and 10,000. A 20,000 was added in 1999 and a 50,000 in 2002.

=== Coin ===
==== 1944–1948 issues ====
Brass (70% copper, 30% zinc) dated 1944:

- 5c, 19 mm, 2.500 g (4 million);
- 12½c, 19 mm, 5.000 g (0·8 million);

Cupronickel dated 1945:

- 5c, 19 mm, 2.500 g (12 million each 1945 & 1946, 18 million 1948);
- 12½c, 19 mm, 5.000 g (11·2 million 1945, 9·2 million 1946, 6 million 1948);

Silver 0.835 fine, dated 1944–1948:

- 25c type 1894, 16 mm, 1.250 g (1·807 million 1944, 8·007 million 1946, 8·64 million 1948);
- 50c, 18 mm, 2·500 g (0·5 million 1944, 4 million 1945, 2·5 million 1946);
- Bs. 1, 23 mm, 5·000 g (8 million 1945);
- Bs. 2, 27 mm, 10·000 g (3 million 1945).

==== 1954–1965 issues ====
The inscription on the coinage was changed to República de Venezuela.

Copper-nickel dated 1958:

- 5c, 19 mm, 2·500 g (25 million);
- 12½c, 23 mm, 5·00 g (10 million).

Silver 0·835 fine, dated 1954–1965:

- 25c, 16 mm, 1·250 g (36 million 1954, 48 million 1960);
- 50c, 18 mm, 2·500 g (15 million 1954, 20 million 1960);
- Bs. 1, 23 mm, 5·000 g (13·5 million 1954, 30 million 1960, 20 million 1965);
- Bs. 2, 27 mm, 10·000 g (4 million 1960. 7·17 million 1965).

==== 1964–1973 issues ====
Copper-nickel dated 1964–1971:

- 5c, 19 mm, 2·500 g (40 million 1964, 60 million 1965, 40 million 1971);
- 10c, 21 mm, 4·00 g (60 million 1971)
- 12½c (2 million 1969).

Nickel dated 1965–1973:

- 25c, 17 mm, 1·750 g (240 million 1965);
- 50c, 20 mm, 3·500 g (180 million 1965; 1985 infra);
- Bs. 1, 23 mm, 5·000 g (180 million 1967);
- Bs. 2, 27 mm, 8·500 g (50 million 1967; 1986 and 1988 infra);
- Bs. 5, 31 mm, 15·000 g (20 million 1973).

Silver 0·900 fine, 1873–1973 centenary of Bolívar's bust on the coinage:

- Bs. 10, 39 mm, 30·000 g (2 million 1973).

==== 1974–1988 issues ====
Copper-clad steel (90% steel, 10% copper) dated 1974–1977:

- 5c, 18 mm, 2·000 g (200 million each 1974 and 1976, 600 million 1977).

Nickel clad steel dated 1983:

- 5c, 18 mm, 2·000 g (600 million 1983).

Copper-nickel clad steel dated 1986:

- 5c, 18 mm, 2·000 g (500 million 1986).

Nickel dated 1977–1988:

- 25c, 17 mm, 1·750 g (120 million 1977);
- 25c, 17 mm, 1·500 g (12 million 1977, 200 million 1978, 150 million 1987);
- 50c type 1965, 20 mm, 3·500 g (50 million 1985);
- Bs. 1, 23 mm, 5·000 g (200 million 1977, 250 million 1986);
- Bs. 2 type 1967, 27 mm, 8·500 g (50 million 1986, 80 million 1988);
- Bs. 5, 31 mm, 15·000 g (60 million 1977, 25 million 1987, 20 million 1988)

==== 1988–1990 issues ====
Nickel-clad steel (90% steel, 10% nickel):

- 25c, 17 mm, 1·500 g (510 million 1989, 400 million 1990);
- 50c, 20 mm, 3·500 g (80 million 1988, 260 million 1989, 300 million 1990);
- Bs. 1, 23 mm, 5·000 g (370 million 1989, 600 million 1990);
- Bs. 2, 27 mm, 8·500 g (200 million 1989, 100 million 1989, 95 million 1989, 395 million 1989, 400 million 1990);
- Bs. 5, 31 mm, 13·300 g (176 million 1989, 200 million 1990).

==== 1998–2005 issues ====
Nickel-clad steel dated 1998:

- Bs. 10, 17 mm, 2·300 g (100 million);
- Bs. 20, 20 mm, 4·300 g (50 million);
- Bs. 50, 23 mm, 6·600 g (50 million);
- Bs. 100, 25 mm, 6·800 g (?);
- Bs. 500, 28·5 mm, 8·400 g (?).

Nickel-clad steel dated 1999:

- Bs. 20, 20 mm, 4·300 g (50 million);
- Bs. 50, 23 mm, 6·600 g (50 million);
- Bs. 100, 25 mm, 6·800 g (?);
- Bs. 500, 28·5 mm, 8·400 g (?)

Nickel-clad steel dated 2000–2004:

- Bs. 10, 17 mm, 2·300 g (80 million 2000, 70 million 2001);
- Bs. 20, 20 mm, 4·300 g (50 million 2000, 70 million 2001);
- Bs. 50, 23 mm, 6·600 g (150 million 2000, 50 million 2001, 220 million 2002, 200 million 2004);
- Bs. 100, 25 mm, 6·800 g (205 million 2001, 205 million 2002, 250 million 2004).

Zinc-aluminium alloy dated 2001:

- Bs.10, 17 mm, 1·739 g (40 million);
- Bs.20, 20 mm, 3·265 g (20 million).

Zinc-aluminium alloy dated 2002–2004:

- Bs. 10, 17 mm, 1·793 g (7·5 million 2002, 50 million 2004);
- Bs. 20, 20 mm, 3·265 g (235 million 2002, 50 million 2004);
- Bs. 500, 28·5 mm, 8·400 g (175 million 2004).

Copper-nickel center, copper-aluminium-nickel ring, 2005:

- Bs. 1000, 24 mm, 8·500 g (150 million 2005).

== 2008–2018 Bolívar fuerte ==
Bolívar fuerte = 100 Céntimos fuertes

Conversion: 1 bolívar fuerte = 1000 old bolívares

The Bolívar fuerte (ISO 4217 code: VEF; Bs.F) replaced the bolívar on January 1, 2008 at 1 bolívar fuerte for 1000 old bolívares, and old notes ceased to be legal tender on January 1, 2009. In preparation for the conversion, all prices were expressed in both bolívars and bolívars fuertes from October 1, 2007.

== 2018–2021 Bolívar soberano ==
Bolívar soberano = 100 Céntimos soberanos

Conversion: 1 bolívar soberano = 100000 bolívares fuertes

The Bolívar soberano (ISO 4217 code: VES; Bs.S) replaced the bolívar fuerte on August 20, 2018 at 1 bolívar soberano for 100000 bolívares fuertes, and old notes ceased to be legal tender on December 5, 2018. In preparation for the conversion, all prices were expressed in both bolívars fuertes and bolívars soberanos from May 1, 2018, but by 2019 expressed only in bolívars soberanos.

== 2021–present Bolívar digital ==
Bolívar digital = 100 Céntimos digitales

Conversion: 1 bolívar digital = 1000000 bolívares soberanos

The Bolívar digital (ISO 4217 code: VED; Bs.D) replaced the bolívar soberano on August 20, 2021 at 1 bolívar digital for 1000000 bolívares soberanos, and old notes still to be legal tender.

== Bibliography ==
- Bruce II, Colin R., ed. (2007), 2008 Standard catalog of world coins 1901–2000 (35th ed.), Iola, WI: Krause, pp. 2162–2170, ISBN 978-0-89689-500-3.
- Cribb, Joe; Cook, Barrie; Carradice, Ian (1990), The coin atlas, New York: Facts on File, pp. 301–302, ISBN 0-8160-2097-3.
- Grillet Correa, Asdrúbal (2000), Monedas metálicas venezolanas (PDF), Caracas: Banco Central de Venezuela, ISBN 980-6395-19-0, archived from the original (PDF) on 2006-01-13.
- Krause, Chester L.; Mishler, Clifford (eds.), Standard catalog of world coins 1801–1900 (3rd ed.), Iola, WI: Krause, pp. 1164–1169, ISBN 0-87349-305-2.
- Meri Gonzalez, Pedro (1991), Venezuela: catalogo de billetes 1991, Caracas: Impresos Urbina C.A., 218 pp.
- Sédillot, René (1955), Toutes les monnaies du monde, Paris: Recueil Sirey, pp. 57–58, 433, 540–541, HG 216.S4.
- Shafer, Neil; Cuhaj, George S., eds. (2002), Standard catalog of world paper money: specialized issues, vol. 1 (9th ed.), Iola, WI: Krause, pp. 1185–1196, ISBN 0-87349-466-0.
- Historia de la Moneda Venezolana (in Spanish) Venezuela's monetary history, including a summary of coinage legislation.
- Las casas de moneda españolas en América del sur (in Spanish), archived from the original on 2008-04-05 On-line book detailing the history of the Spanish mints in South America.
- Numismatic Catalog of Venezuela Detailed information, with images, of all Venezuelan coins and paper money, regularly updated.
