= Céntimo =

Unit of certain currencies

The céntimo (Spanish) or cêntimo (Portuguese) was a currency unit of Spain, Portugal and their former colonies. The word derived from the Latin centimus meaning "hundredth part". The main Spanish currency, before the euro, was the peseta which was divided into 100 céntimos. In Portugal it was the real and later the escudo, until it was also replaced by the euro. In the European community cent is the official name for one hundredth of a euro. However, both céntimo (in Spanish) and cêntimo (in Portuguese) are commonly used to describe the euro cent.

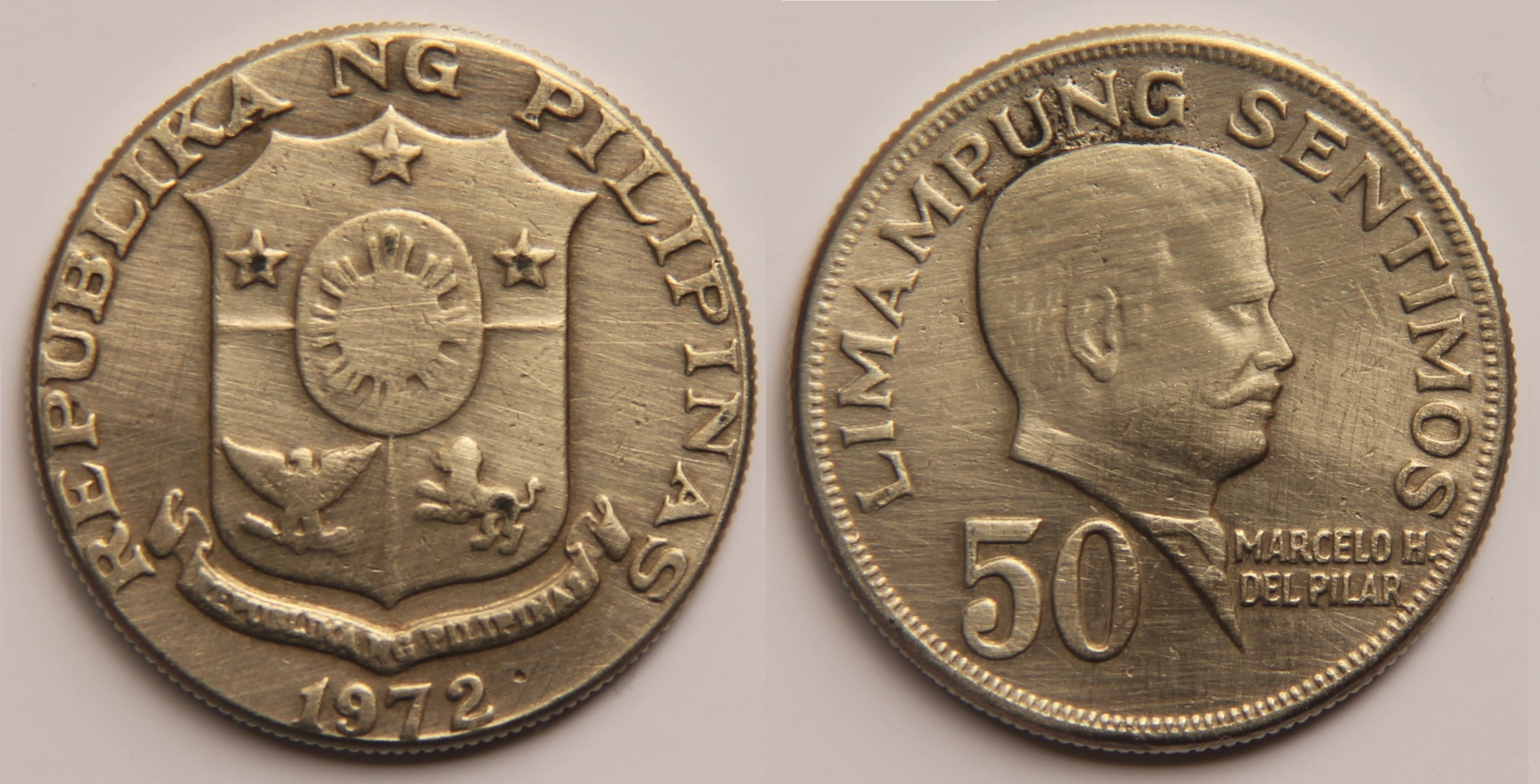
50 Philippine sentimos, dated 1972.

== Current use ==
Céntimo or cêntimo is one-hundredth of the following basic monetary units:

=== Portuguese cêntimo ===
- Angolan kwanza
- São Tomé and Príncipe dobra
- Euro cent

=== Spanish céntimo ===
- Costa Rican colón (but as centavo between 1917 and 1920)
- Paraguayan guaraní
- Peruvian sol
- Philippine peso (also called centavo in English)
- Venezuelan bolívar
- Euro cent

== Obsolete ==
=== Portuguese cêntimo ===
- Mozambican metica (never issued)

=== Spanish céntimo ===
- Peruvian inti
- Peruvian sol (1863–1985)
- Sahrawi peseta
- Spanish peseta
