= Boca del Río, Nueva Esparta =

Boca del Río
- Town
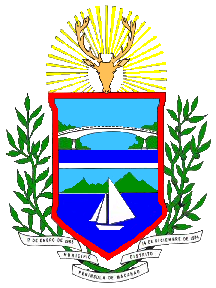
- Coat of arms

- Location in Venezuela
- Coordinates: 10.9673°N 64.1811°W
- Country: Venezuela
- State: Nueva Esparta

Boca de Río is a town on Isla Margarita, in the state of Nueva Esparta, Venezuela. It is the capital of the Macanao Peninsula Municipality.
