= Coat of arms of Venezuela =

- Armiger: Bolivarian Republic of Venezuela
- Adopted: March 12, 2006
- Motto: 19 DE ABRIL DE 1810 - INDEPENDENCIA (April 19, 1810 - Independence); 20 DE FEBRERO DE 1859 - FEDERACIÓN (February 20, 1859 - Federation); REPÚBLICA BOLIVARIANA DE VENEZUELA (Bolivarian Republic of Venezuela)

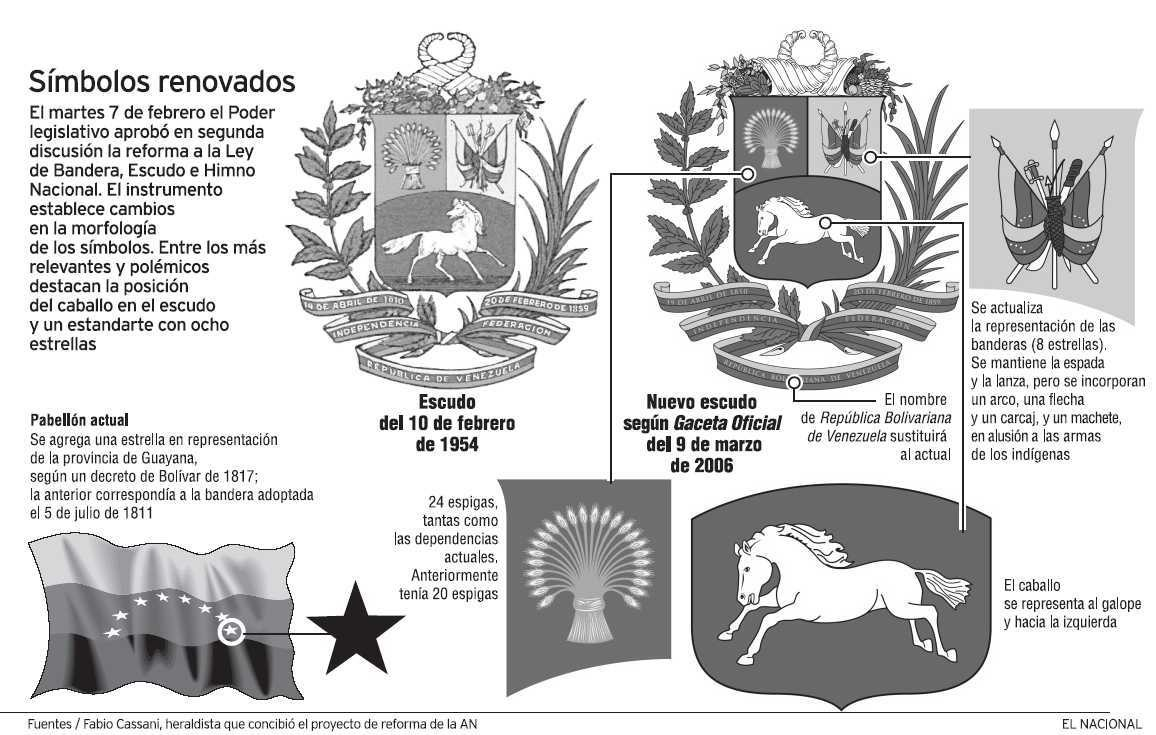
Infographic from Venezuelan newspaper El Nacional, 12 March 2006

The current coat of arms of Venezuela was primarily approved by the Congress on April 18, 1836, undergoing small modifications through history, reaching the present version.

The coat of arms was established in the Law of the National Flag, Shield and Anthem (Ley de Bandera, Escudo e Himno Nacionales), passed on February 17, 1954, by the military governor of Venezuela, Marcos Pérez Jiménez. The shield is divided in the colors of the national flag. In the dexter chief, on a red field, wheat represents the union of the 24 states of the Republic existing at the time and the wealth of the nation. In sinister chief, on a yellow field, weapons (a sword, a sabre and three lances) and two national flags are tied by a branch of laurel, as a symbol of triumph in war. In base, on a deep blue field, a wild white horse (representing Simón Bolívar's white horse Palomo) runs free, an emblem of independence and freedom.

Above the shield are two crossed cornucopias (horns of plenty), pouring out wealth. The shield is flanked by an olive branch and another of palm, both tied at the bottom of the coat with a large band that represents the national tricolour (yellow for the nation's wealth, blue for the ocean separating Venezuela from Spain, and red for the blood and courage of the people). The following captions appear in golden letters on the blue stripe:

| 19 de Abril de 1810 (April 19, 1810) | 20 de Febrero de 1859 (February 20, 1859) |
| Independencia (Independence) | Federación (Federation) |
República Bolivariana de Venezuela (Bolivarian Republic of Venezuela)

== 2006 changes ==
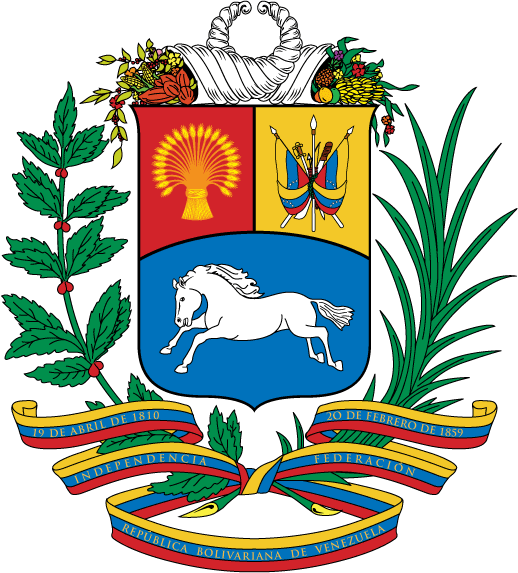
Coat of arms made in 2006 by heraldist Fabio Cassani Pironti

On March 7, 2006, the National Assembly approved changes to the coat of arms and the flag of Venezuela, which were made official on March 12, 2006, coinciding with Flag Day. Prior to 2007, the horse was running to the sinister side of the shield with its head turned to the dexter (to the viewer, this appears as the horse galloping towards the right and looking back to the left). In heraldic practice, animals and beasts are to appear facing to the dexter, which is considered the natural and honorable position. The Economist observed that Hugo Chávez ordered the seal changed after his daughter, Rosinés Chávez Rodríguez, had described the previous horse as “looking backwards”. Government supporters state, however, that even if the president's daughter was the one who sparked the discussion, both the legislative and executive branch agreed to changes. These were adding a machete to represent the peasant fighters during the revolutionary wars in Venezuela since the War of Independence, and a bow and arrow as a tribute to the brave indigenous population who resisted the Spanish conquistadors.

Many critics have suggested that the horse, now running to the dexter (to the viewer's left) was a political statement of the left-wing government of President Hugo Chávez. Previously in the Venezuelan arms adopted in 1863, the horse was moving as it is seen today, to the dexter (the viewer's left). Also to note is that in heraldry, positions are not described from the viewer's point of view, but rather the shield's, so while the horse appears to be galloping left to one observing the arms, the horse is actually galloping to the dexter, or right, side of the shield. This symbolizes Venezuela as the first of the independent states of South America, and Simon Bolivar's campaigns of liberation for all of Latin America, which started here in 1811 (with Venezuela's Declaration of Independence and the earlier Caracas Junta of 1810) and ended with his final victory in the Battle of Ayacucho on December 9, 1824, all the while riding his white horse Palomo.

Political opponents have also claimed that in addition to being politically motivated, the changes were economically wasteful. At the time of the official unveiling, the opposition party stated that they will not use the new flag or coat of arms, but retain the old and employ them in demonstrations against the government. However, by 2008, and with a slightly improved political climate, the new coat of arms and flag have been generally accepted among the population and opposition.

Heraldist Fabio Cassani Pironti, commissioned by the National Assembly, made the reform of the National coats of arms.

Historical Coat of arms

Province of Venezuela (1777–1811).

First Republic of Venezuela (1811–1812).

Second Republic of Venezuela (1812–1814).

Third Republic of Venezuela (1814–1819).

Gran Colombia (1819–1821).

Gran Colombia (1821–1830).

State of Venezuela (1830–1836).

State of Venezuela (1836–1863).

State of Venezuela (1863–1864).

United States of Venezuela (1864–1871).

United States of Venezuela (1871–1905).

United States of Venezuela (1905–1911).

United States of Venezuela (1911–1930).

United States of Venezuela (1930–1953) & Republic of Venezuela (1954).

Republic of Venezuela (1954–2006).

== Notes ==
In heraldic descriptions dexter means to the right from the viewpoint of the bearer of the shield, i.e. the viewer's left; sinister means left from the viewpoint of the bearer of the shield, i.e. the viewer's right.

== See also ==
- Armorial of Venezuela
