= Economy of Venezuela =

- Caracas, the financial centre of Venezuela
- Currency: Bolívar Digital (VES)
- Fiscal year: Calendar year
- Trade organizations: WTO, OPEC, Unasur, ALBA
- Country group: lower-middle income country

Statistics
- Population: ▲28,405,543 (2024)
- GDP: ▲$124.18 billion (nominal, 2026); ▲$282.37 billion (PPP, 2026)
- GDP rank: 69st (nominal, 2026); 73th (PPP, 2026)
- GDP growth: ▲5.0% (2026f)
- GDP per capita: ▲$4,358 (nominal, 2026); ▲$9,900 (PPP, 2026)
- GDP per capita rank: 130th (nominal, 2026); 135rd (PPP, 2026)
- GDP by sector: Agriculture: 4.7%; Industry: 40.4%; Services: 54.9%; (2017 est.)
- Inflation (CPI): ▲628.8% (2026f)
- Population below national poverty line: ▲87.0% (2017 est.); 19.7% (2015 est.)
- Gini coefficient: 39 medium (2011)
- Human Development Index: ▲0.709 high (2023) (121st); ▲0.605 medium IHDI (87th) (2023)
- Corruption Perceptions Index: 10 out of 100 points (2025, 178th rank)
- Labor force: ▲11,118,416 (2024)
- Labor force by occupation: Communal, social and personal services: 31.4%; Commercial, restaurants and hotels: 23.4%; Manufacturing industry: 11.6%; Construction: 9.0%; Transport, storage and communications: 8.7%; Agriculture: 6.5%; Financial, insurance and real estate: 6.1%; (2015)
- Unemployment: ▲35.6% (2018 est.)
- Main industries: Petroleum, construction materials, food processing, iron ore mining, steel, aluminum; motor vehicle assembly, real estate, tourism and ecotourism

External
- Exports: ▲$32.08 billion (2017)
- Export goods: Petroleum, chemicals, agricultural products and basic manufactures
- Main export partners: United States 42%; China 23%; India 19%; Singapore 4.5%; Spain 1.4%; (2017)
- Imports: $9.1 billion (2017)
- Import goods: Food, clothing, cars, technological items, raw materials, machinery and equipment, transport equipment and construction material
- Main import partners: United States 38%; China 18%; Mexico 12%; Brazil 5.2%; Colombia 3.5%; (2017)
- FDI stock: ▼$32.74 billion (31 December 2017 est.); ▲ Abroad: $35.15 billion (31 December 2017 est.)
- Current account: ▲$4.277 billion (2017 est.)
- Gross external debt: ▼$100.3 billion (31 December 2017 est.)

Public finance
- Government debt: ▲38.9% of GDP (2017 est.) (Note: Data cover central government debt as well as the debt of state-owned oil company PDVSA. The data include treasury debt held by foreign entities, some debt issued by subnational entities as well as intragovernmental debt which consists of treasury borrowings from surpluses in the social funds such as for retirement, medical care and unemployment. Some debt instruments for the social funds are sold at public auctions.)
- Foreign reserves: ▼$8.999 billion (April 2019); ▼$9.661 billion (31 December 2017 est.)
- Budget balance: −46.1% (of GDP) (2017 est.)
- Spending: 189.7 billion (2017 est.)
- Credit rating: Standard & Poor's: SD (domestic); SD (foreign); Outlook: negative Moody's: C Outlook: stable Fitch: CC (domestic); RD (foreign); Outlook: negative
- All values, unless otherwise stated, are in US dollars.

Venezuela has a developing economy strongly dependent on its natural resources. Its economic growth is closely linked to petroleum, as the country holds the largest crude oil supply in the world. Venezuela was historically among the wealthiest economies in South America, particularly from the 1950s to 1980s. With the turn of the 21st century, the Venezuelan economy has been in a state of total collapse since 2013. Following the death of socialist populist Hugo Chávez and the succession of Nicolás Maduro, millions of citizens have fled Venezuela as economic migrants. GDP has fallen by 80% in less than a decade. The economy is characterized by corruption, food shortages, unemployment, mismanagement of the oil sector. Venezuela underwent hyperinflation from 2014 to 2024, with inflation stabilized 59.61%.

Venezuela is the 25th largest producer of oil in the world and the 8th largest member of OPEC. Venezuela also manufactures and exports heavy industry products such as steel, aluminum, and cement. Other notable manufacturing includes electronics and automobiles as well as beverages and foodstuffs. Agriculture in Venezuela accounts for approximately 4.7% of GDP, 7.3% of the labor force and at least one-fourth of Venezuela's land area. Venezuela exports rice, corn, fish, tropical fruit, coffee, pork and beef. Venezuela has an estimated US$14.3 trillion worth of natural resources and is not self-sufficient in most areas of agriculture. Exports accounted for 16.7% of GDP and petroleum products accounted for about 95% of those exports.

Since the 1920s, Venezuela has been a rentier state, offering oil as its main export. From the 1950s to the early 1980s, the Venezuelan economy experienced a steady growth that attracted many immigrants, with the nation enjoying the highest standard of living in Latin America. The situation reversed when oil prices collapsed during the 1980s. Hugo Chavez became president in 1999 and implemented a form of socialism (the Bolivarian Revolution) that resulted in the collapse or nationalization of many Venezuelan businesses, and purged the state-run PDVSA oil company, replacing thousands of workers with political supporters with no technical expertise. The Chavez administration also imposed stringent currency controls in 2003 in an attempt to prevent capital flight. These actions resulted in a decline in oil production and exports and a series of stern currency devaluations.

Price controls and expropriation of numerous farmlands and various industries are government policies along with a near-total freeze on any access to foreign currency at reasonable "official" exchange rates. These have resulted in severe shortages in Venezuela and steep price rises of all common goods, including food, water, household products, spare parts, tools and medical supplies; forcing many manufacturers to either cut production or close down, with many ultimately abandoning the country as has been the case with several technological firms and most automobile makers.

Venezuela's economy has been in a state of total economic collapse since 2013. In 2015, Venezuela had over 100% inflation—the highest in the world and the highest in the country's history at that time. According to independent sources, the rate increased to 80,000% at the end of 2018 with Venezuela spiraling into hyperinflation while the poverty rate was nearly 90 percent of the population. On 14 November 2017, credit rating agencies declared that Venezuela was in default with its debt payments, with Standard & Poor's categorizing Venezuela as being in "selective default".

The sanctions imposed by the United States on the Venezuelan economy from 2015 onwards, and significantly tightened from 2017 onwards, restricted oil exports, crippled the Venezuelan economy, froze Venezuelan financial assets, and restricted the country's access to international payment systems. Sanctions caused Venezuela a loss of $38 billion between 2016-19, prevented the government from resolving the crisis using fiscal and monetary policy changes, and in combination with preexisting negative trends resulted in an estimated 40,000 excess deaths between 2017-18.

The United States has been Venezuela's most important trading partner despite the strained relations between the two countries. American exports to Venezuela have included machinery, agricultural products, medical instruments and cars. Venezuela is one of the top four suppliers of foreign oil to the United States. About 500 American companies are represented in Venezuela. According to the Central Bank of Venezuela, between 1998 and 2008 the government received around US$325 billion through oil production and exports in general.^{[17]} According to the International Energy Agency (as of August 2015), the production of 2.4 million barrels per day supplied 500,000 barrels to the United States.^{[18]} A report published by Transparencia Venezuela in 2022 estimated that illegal activities in the country made up around 21% of its GDP.

== History ==
=== 1922–1959 ===
After oil was discovered in Venezuela in 1922 during the Maracaibo strike, Venezuela's dictator Juan Vicente Gómez allowed American oil companies to write Venezuela's petroleum law. In 1943, Standard Oil of New Jersey accepted a new agreement in Venezuela based on the 50–50 principle, described as "a landmark event". Even more favorable terms were negotiated in 1945, after a coup brought to power a left-leaning government that included Juan Pablo Pérez Alfonso.

From the 1950s to the early 1980s, the Venezuelan economy, which was buoyed by high oil prices, was one of the strongest and most prosperous in South America. The continuous growth during that period attracted many immigrants.

In 1958, a new government, again including Pérez Alfonso, devised a plan for an international oil cartel, that would become OPEC.

During Pérez Jiménez' dictatorship from 1952 to 1958, Venezuela enjoyed remarkably high GDP growth, so that in the late 1950s Venezuela's real GDP per capita almost reached that of Ireland or West Germany. Albeit, West Germany was still recovering from WW2 destruction of German infrastructure. However, Rómulo Betancourt, president from 1959 to 1964, inherited from 1958 to 1959 onward an enormous internal and external debt caused by rampant public spending. He managed to balance Venezuela's public budget and initiate an agrarian reform.

=== 1960s–1990s ===
Buoyed by a strong oil sector in the 1960s and 1970s, Venezuela's governments were able to maintain social harmony by spending fairly large amounts on public programs including health care, education, transport and food subsidies. Literacy and welfare programs benefited tremendously from these conditions. The first tenure of Carlos Andrés Pérez from 1974 to 1979 benefited from the 1970s energy crisis, tripling the amount of public spending and nationalizing the oil industry, establishing PDVSA. He also increased government debt significantly, nationalized the iron industry, created new state-owned companies, nationalized the central bank and replaced its board with cabinet members, eliminating the bank's independence as a result. His government was also allowed to establish the first minimum wage and salary increases with an enabling act approved by the National Congress. Pérez was accused of excessive and disorderly public spending. Venezuela's external debt grew from $2 billion in 1972 to $33 billion by 1982.

Venezuela's economic situation was reversed when oil prices collapsed during the 1980s. Luis Herrera Campins was elected just as the oil prices collapsed, with the economy experiencing turmoil throughout his tenure. The economy contracted and inflation levels (consumer price inflation) rose, remaining between 6 and 12% from 1982 to 1986. Policies implemented by Herrera to reduce inflation and reverse increased government spending were not effective, resulting with the election of Jaime Lusinchi in the 1983 Venezuelan general election. The Lusinchi administration continued strict foreign exchange controls and excessive spending while oil prices continued to decrease. Lusinchi focused the nation's funds on paying foreign debtors, sending $15 billion out to international lenders from 1985 to 1988 to tend the remaining $32 billion of debt. By the end of his presidency, the public began to suffer from inflated prices and shortages of basic goods. Carlos Andrés Pérez based his campaign for the 1988 Venezuelan general election in his legacy of abundance during his first presidential period and initially rejected liberalization policies. Venezuela's international reserves were only US$300 million at the time of Pérez' election into the presidency; Pérez decided to respond to the debt, public spending, economic restrictions and rentier state by liberalizing the economy. He announced a technocratic cabinet and a group of economic policies to fix macroeconomic imbalances known as El Gran Viraje (English: The Great Turn), called by detractors as El Paquetazo Económico (English: The Economic Package). Among the policies there was the reduction of fuel subsidies and the increase of public transportation fares by thirty percent (VEB 16 Venezuelan bolívares, or US$0.4). The increase was supposed to be implemented on 1 March 1989, but bus drivers decided to apply the price rise on 27 February, a day before payday in Venezuela. In response, protests and rioting began on the morning of 27 February 1989 in Guarenas, a town near Caracas; a lack of timely intervention by authorities, as the Caracas Metropolitan Police was on a labor strike, led to the protests and rioting quickly spreading to the capital and other towns across the country.

CANTV's old logo, state telecommunications company privatized in 1991.

By late 1991, as part of the economic reforms, Carlos Andrés Pérez' administration had sold three banks, a shipyard, two sugar mills, an airline, a telephone company and a cell phone band, receiving a total of US$2,287 million. The most remarkable auction was CANTV's, a telecommunications company, which was sold at the price of US$1,885 million to the consortium composed of American AT&T International, General Telephone Electronic and the Venezuelan Electricidad de Caracas and Banco Mercantil. The privatization ended Venezuela's monopoly over telecommunications and surpassed even the most optimistic predictions, with over US$1,000 million above the base price and US$500 million more than the bid offered by the competition group. By the end of the year, inflation had dropped from 84% in 1989 to 31%, Venezuela's international reserves were now worth US$14,000 million and there was an economic growth of 9% (called as an "Asian growth"), the largest in Latin America at the time. While foreign debtors were repaid and the economy grew, by 1992, the majority of economic benefits were experienced by the upper class while middle to lower classes faced increased poverty and high unemployment rates between ten and forty percent.

Overreliance on oil exports and a fractured political system without parties agreeing on policies caused many of the problems. By the mid-1990s, Venezuela under President Rafael Caldera saw annual inflation rates of 50–60% from 1993 to 1997, with the country suffering a banking crisis. In 1998, the economic crisis had grown even worse. Per capita GDP was at the same level as 1963 (after adjusting 1963 dollar to 1998 value), down a third from its 1978 peak; and the purchasing power of the average salary was a third of its 1978 level.

=== 1999–2013 ===
Hugo Chávez was elected President in December 1998 and took office in February 1999. From 1999 to the end of 2012, when Hugo Chavez health decayed preventing him from fulfilling any presidential duties, the GDP grew from 97.52 billion dollars to 372.59 billion dollars. In the same period, inflation remained stable around 20% year.

From 1999 In 2000, oil prices soared, offering Chávez funds not seen since Venezuela's economic collapse in the 1980s. Chávez implemented economic policies that leaned toward social democracy, utilizing oil revenues to fund social programs. These policies increased Venezuela's economic reliance on high oil prices.

During the first four years of Chávez's presidency, the economy initially grew between 1999 and 2001 but contracted from 2001 to 2003, returning to GDP levels similar to those of 1997. The early decline was influenced by low oil prices and later exacerbated by the events surrounding the 2002 coup attempt and the 2002–2003 general strike. Additional contributing factors included capital flight and reduced foreign investment. GDP decreased from 50.0 trillion bolívares in 1998 to 42.4 trillion bolívares in 2003 (measured in constant 1998 bolívares).

The hardest-hit sectors in the worst recession years (2002–2003) were construction (−55.9%), petroleum (−26.5%), commerce (−23.6%) and manufacturing (−22.5%). The drop in the petroleum sector was caused by adherence to the OPEC quota established in 2002 and the virtual cessation of exports during the PdVSA-led general strike of 2002–2003. The non-petroleum sector of the economy contracted by 6.5% in 2002. The bolívar, which had been suffering from serious inflation and devaluation relative to international standards since the late 1980s, stabilized around 20% inflation.

During Chávez's presidency, inflation was significantly reduced and maintained at an average of around 20%, marking a substantial improvement compared to the late 1980s and the turbulent 1990s, when inflation reached its highest point at 100% in 1996. The inflation rate, as measured by the consumer price index, stood at 35.8% in 1998, dropped to a low of 12.5% in 2001, and rose to 31.1% in 2003. In response to pressures on the bolívar, declining international reserves, and the economic impact of the oil industry work stoppage, the Ministry of Finance and the central bank suspended foreign exchange trading on January 23, 2003. Shortly afterward, the government established CADIVI, a currency control board, on February 6, 2003. CADIVI regulated foreign exchange procedures and set the exchange rate at 1,596 bolívares per US dollar for purchases and 1,600 bolívares per US dollar for sales.

The housing market in Venezuela shrunk significantly with developers avoiding Venezuela due to the massive number of companies who have had their property expropriated by the government. According to The Wall Street Journal, Venezuela had the weakest property rights in the world, scoring only 5.0 on a scale of 100, with expropriation without compensation being common. The housing shortage in Venezuela was significant enough that, in 2007, a group of squatters occupied the Centro Financiero Confinanzas, an unfinished economic complex originally intended to represent the country's economic growth.

The Venezuelan economy contracted by 5.8% in the first quarter of 2010 compared to the same period in 2009 and recorded the highest inflation rate in Latin America at 30.5%. President Chávez expressed optimism about Venezuela's recovery, although the International Monetary Fund (IMF) projected that Venezuela would be the only country in the region to remain in recession that year. The IMF described Venezuela's economic recovery as "delayed and weak" compared to other countries in the region.

Nevertheless, the Venezuelan economy resumed a growth trend in subsequent years, continuing until 2012. The economic downturn began during Nicolás Maduro's leadership, as Chávez’s health declined and he became increasingly unable to govern effectively.

=== 2013–2020 ===
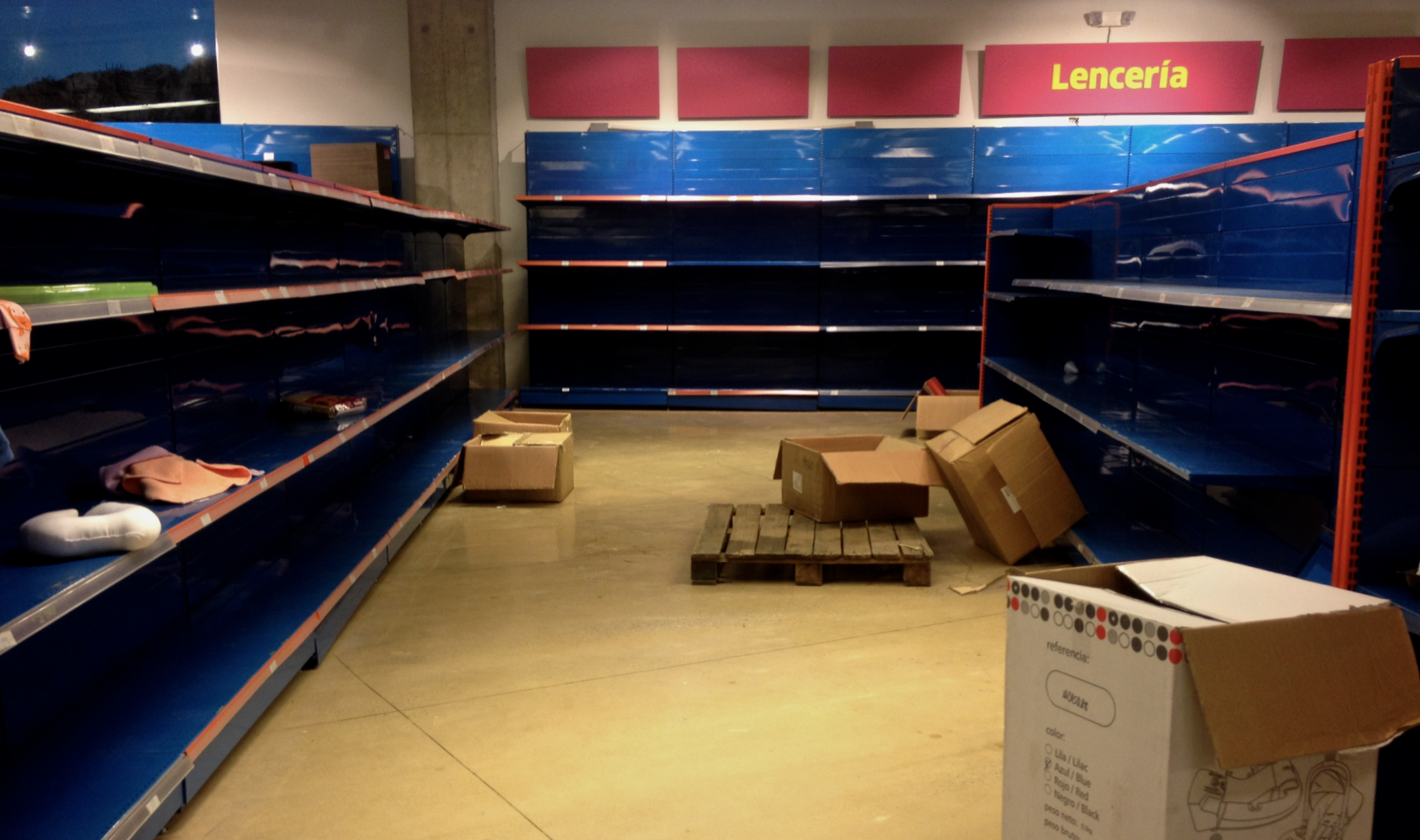
Shortages in Venezuela leave store shelves empty

According to the misery index in 2013, Venezuela ranked as the top spot globally with the highest misery index score. The International Finance Corporation ranked Venezuela one of the lowest countries for doing business with, ranking it 180 of 185 countries for its Doing Business 2013 report with protecting investors and taxes being its worst rankings. In early 2013, the bolívar fuerte was devalued due to growing shortages in Venezuela. The shortages included necessities such as toilet paper, milk and flour. Shortages also affected healthcare in Venezuela, with the University of Caracas Medical Hospital ceasing to perform surgeries due to the lack of supplies in 2014. The Bolivarian government's policies also made it difficult to import drugs and other medical supplies. Due to such complications, many Venezuelans died avoidable deaths with medical professionals having to use limited resources using methods that were replaced decades ago.

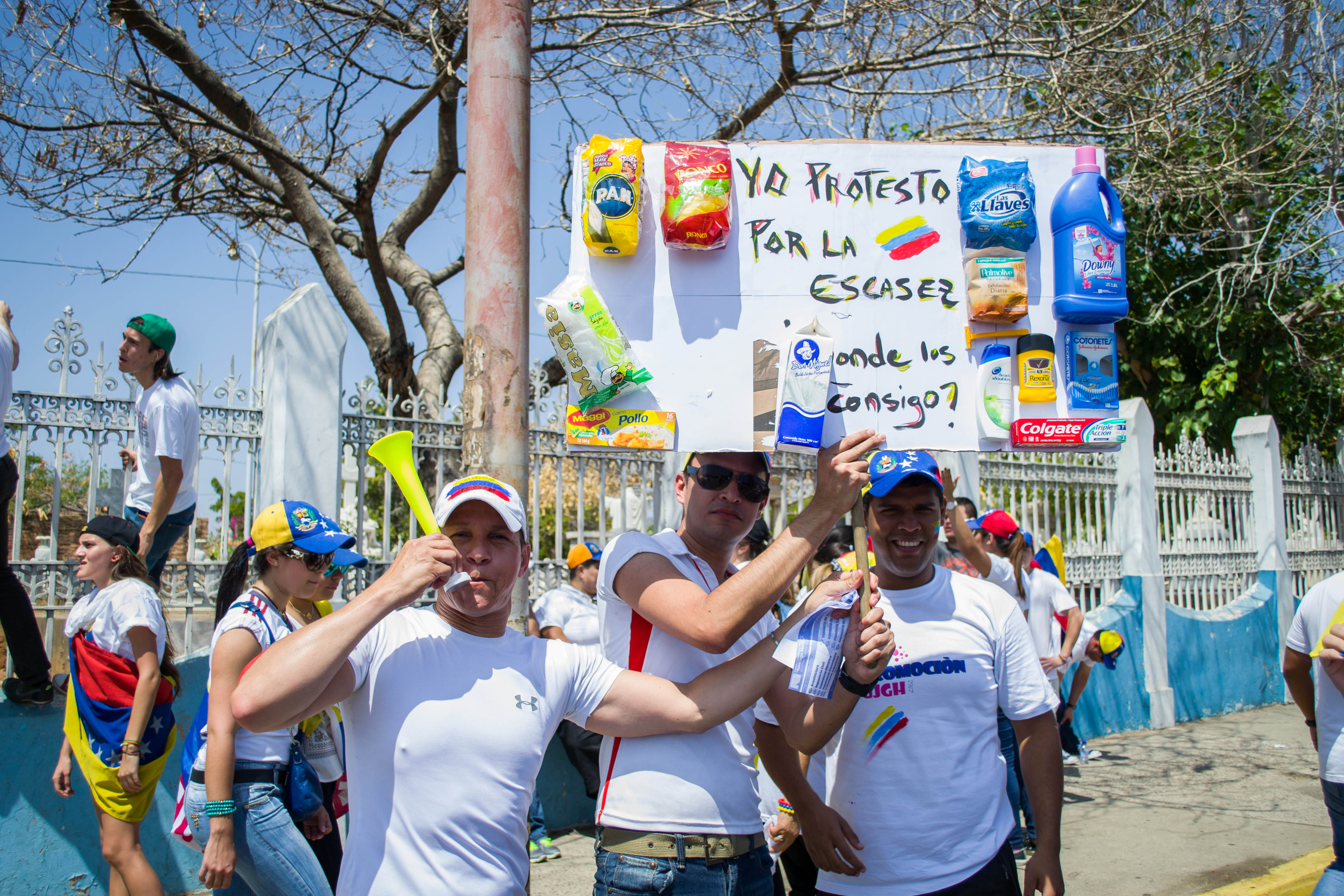
An opposition protester during the 2014 Venezuelan protests holding a sign saying: "I protest for the scarcity. Where can we get these?"

In 2014, Venezuela entered an economic recession having its GDP growth decline to −3.0%. Venezuela was placed at the top of the misery index for the second year in a row. The Economist said Venezuela was "probably the world's worst-managed economy". Citibank believed that "the economy has little prospect of improvement" and that the state of the Venezuelan economy was a "disaster". The Doing Business 2014 report by the International Finance Corporation and the World Bank ranked Venezuela one score lower than the previous year, then 181 out of 185. According to Foreign Policy, Venezuela was ranked last in the world on its Base Yield Index due to low returns that investors receive when investing in Venezuela. In a 2014 report titled Scariest Places on the Business Frontiers by Zurich Financial Services and reported by Bloomberg, Venezuela was ranked as the riskiest emerging market in the world. Many companies such as Toyota, Ford Motor Co., General Motors Company, Air Canada, Air Europa, American Airlines, Copa Airlines, TAME, TAP Airlines and United Airlines slowed or stopped operation due to the lack of hard currency in the country, with Venezuela owing such foreign companies billions of dollars. Venezuela also dismantled CADIVI, a government body in charge of currency exchange. CADIVI was known for holding money from the private sector and was suspected to be corrupt.

Venezuelans eating from garbage in late 2015

Venezuela again topped the misery index according to the World Bank in 2015. The IMF predicted in October 2015 an inflation rate of 159% for the year 2015—the highest rate in Venezuelan history and the highest rate in the world—and that the economy would contract by 10%. According to leaked documents from the Central Bank of Venezuela, the country ended 2015 with an inflation rate of 270% and a shortage rate of goods over 70%.

President Nicolás Maduro reorganized his economic cabinet in 2016 with the group mainly consisting of leftist Venezuelan academics. According to Bank of America's investment division Merrill Lynch, Maduro's new cabinet was expected to tighten currency and price controls in the country. Alejandro Werner, the head of IMF's Latin American Department, stated that 2015 figures released by the Central Bank of Venezuela were not accurate and that Venezuela's inflation for 2015 was 275%. Other forecast inflation figures by IMF and Bank of America were 720% and 1,000% in 2016, Analysts believed that the Venezuelan government has been manipulating economic statistics, especially since they did not report adequate data since late 2014. According to economist Steve Hanke of Johns Hopkins University, the Central Bank of Venezuela delayed the release of statistics and lied about figures much like the Soviet Union did, with Hanke saying that a lie coefficient had to be used to observe Venezuela's economic data.

By 2016, media outlets said that Venezuela was suffering an economic collapse with the IMF saying that it expected it to reach a 500% inflation rate and 10% contraction in the GDP. In December 2016, monthly inflation exceeded 50 percent for the 30th consecutive day, meaning the Venezuelan economy was officially experiencing hyperinflation, making it the 57th country to be added to the Hanke-Krus World Hyperinflation Table.

In 2016, Venezuela had the highest annual inflation in the world

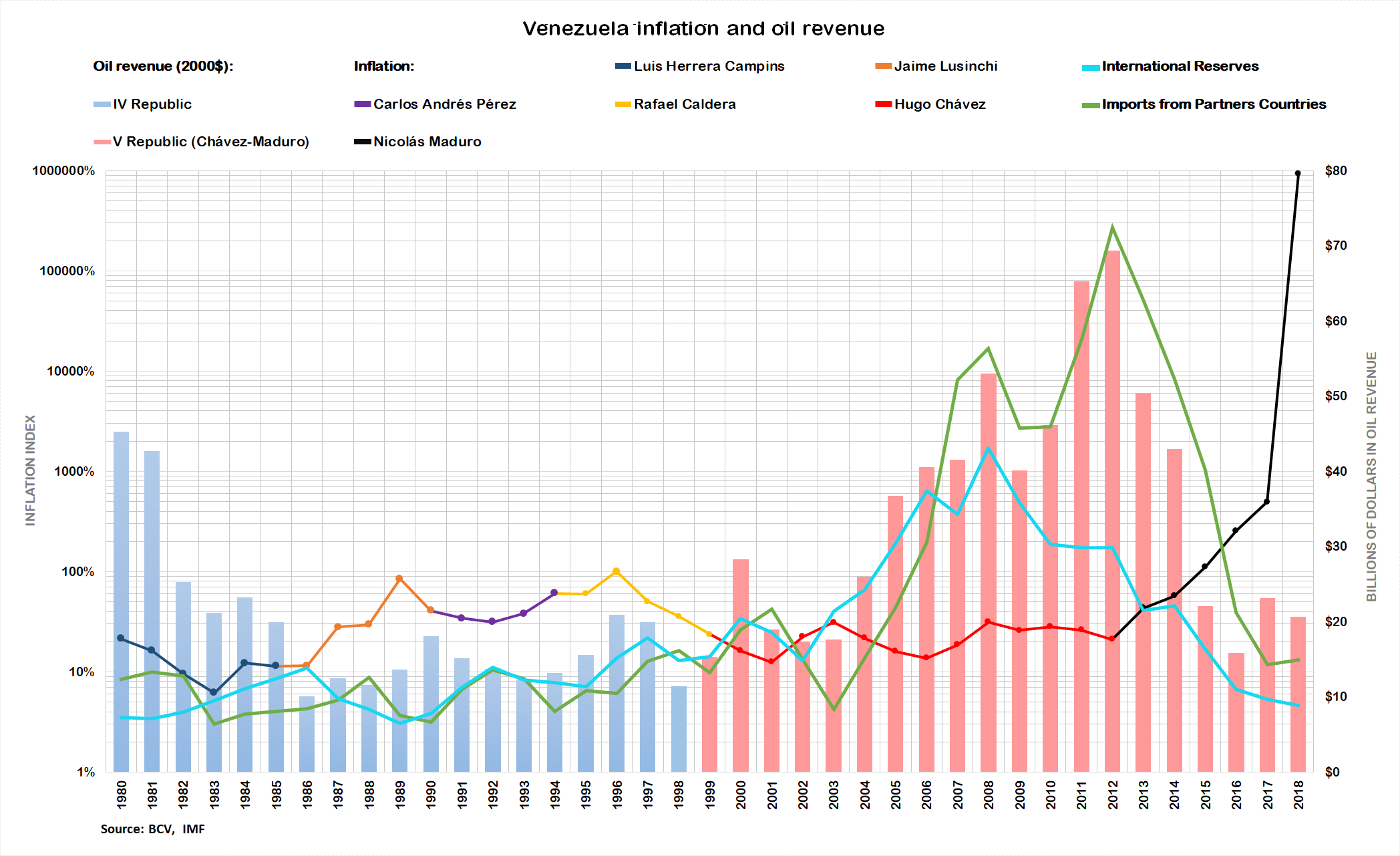
Venezuela's historic inflation rate beside annual oil revenues. This chart is in a logarithmic scale.

On 25 August 2017, it was reported that new United States sanctions against Venezuela did not ban trading of the country's existing non-government bonds, with the sanctions instead including restrictions intended to block the government's ability to fund itself.

On 26 January 2018, the government ended the protected, subsidized fixed exchange rate mechanism that was highly overvalued as a result of rampant inflation. The National Assembly (led by the opposition) said inflation in 2017 was over 4,000%, a level other independent economists also agreed with. In February, the government launched an oil-backed cryptocurrency called the petro.

Bloomberg's Cafe Con Leche Index calculated the price increase for a cup of coffee to have increased by 718% in the 12 weeks before 18 January 2018, an annualized inflation rate of 448,000%. The finance commission of the National Assembly noted in July 2018 that prices were doubling every 28 days with an annualized inflation rate of 25,000%.

The country was heading for a selective default in 2017. In early 2018, the country was in default, meaning it could not pay its lenders.

On 24 August 2017 U.S. President Donald Trump imposed sanctions on the state debt of Venezuela which ban to make transactions with state debt of Venezuela including the participation in debt restructuring. On 13 November 2017 the technical default period ended and Venezuela did not pay coupons on its dollar eurobonds. This caused a cross default on other dollar bonds. On 30 November ISDA committee consisting of 15 biggest banks admitted default on state debt obligations what in its turn entailed payments on CDS. According to Cbonds, nowadays there are 20 international Venezuelan bonds which are recognized in default. The overall amount of defaulted obligations is equal to 36 billion dollars.

=== 2020-present ===
Almost 82% of Venezuelans live in poverty, with 53% in extreme poverty, unable to buy even basic foodstuffs.

– A UN special reporter said in February 2024 after visiting the country.

Venezuela was “once among South America's wealthiest countries” before the economic meltdown under the Maduro regime.

“The formerly rich petro-state has seen GDP fall by 80% in less than a decade, driving some seven million of its citizens to flee. Most Venezuelans live on just a few dollars a month, with the health care and education systems in total disrepair and biting shortages of electricity and fuel” as of 2024, according to VOA (report from AFP).

A report published by Transparencia Venezuela in 2022 estimated that illegal activities in the country made up around 21% of its GDP. According to the report, drug, oil and gold trafficking, as well as illegal activities in ports and customs had generated over 9.4 billion dollars for organized crime protected by corrupt officials. In 2021, gold extraction generated around 2.3 billion dollars, of which the State received only 25%.

By 2023, the economic situation of Venezuela improved, with the economy growing by 15% and extreme poverty rates decreasing, thanks to a liberalized economy and more access to the United States dollar. However, inequality is high, with wealthy Venezuelans making more than 70 times the poorest ones. In 2024 inflation cooled to 48%, the lowest in a decade, though in 2025 it surged again to 475%. In 2026, the IMF restored its relations with Venezuela, after a 7 year suspension over the legitimacy of Venezuelan government in 2019 and concern over unreliable economic data. The renewed relations comes after the last political shifts in the country which allows Venezuela to reenter the international financial system.

== Sectors ==
Under the tenures of Hugo Chávez and his successor Nicolás Maduro, many businesses abandoned Venezuela. In 1999, there were 13,000 companies in the country. By 2016, less than a third of companies remained in Venezuela, with only 4,000 companies operating in the nation.

=== Petroleum and gas ===
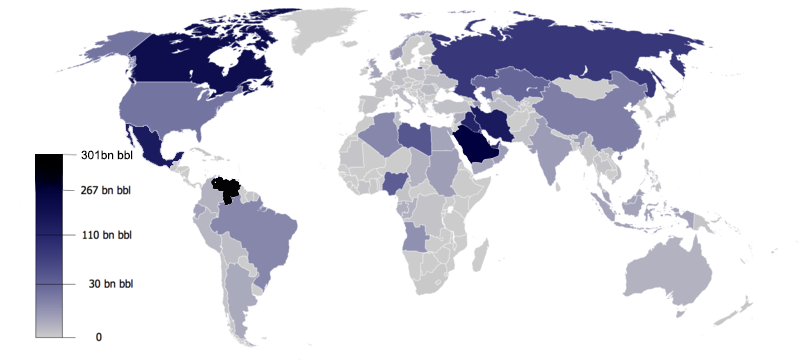
A map of world oil reserves according to OPEC, 2013

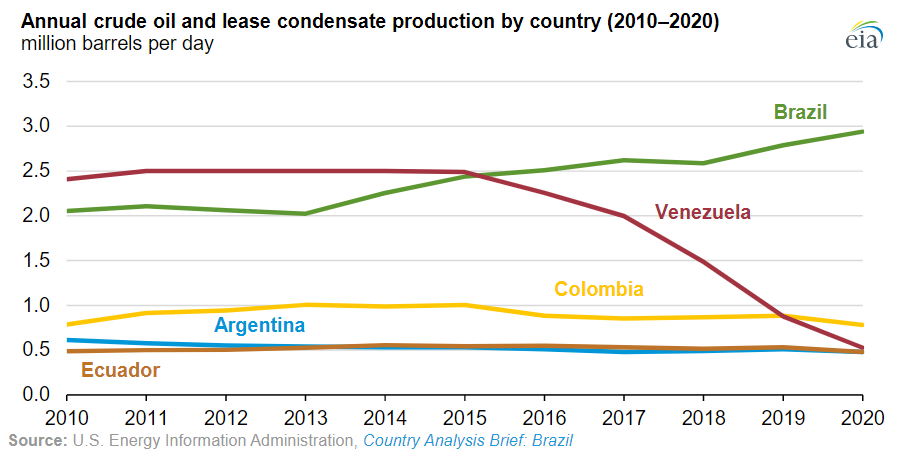
Oil production in Venezuela (red) fell markedly between 2015 and 2020

Venezuela has the world's largest proven oil reserves, totaling 302.81 billion barrels at the end of 2017. The country is a major producer of petroleum products, which remain the keystone of the Venezuelan economy. The International Energy Agency shows how Venezuela's oil production has fallen in the last years, producing only 2,300,000 barrels (370,000 m^{3}) daily, down from 3.5 million in 1998. However, the oil incomes will double its value in local currency with the recent currency devaluation. Venezuela has large energy subsidies. In 2015, the cost of petrol was just US$0.06 per gallon, costing 23% of government revenues. In February 2016, the government finally decided to raise the price, but only to 6 bolívar (about 60¢ at the official rate of exchange) per litre for premium and just 1 bolívar (10¢) for lower-grade petrol.

Venezuela’s economy has historically been highly dependent on oil production and exports. Since the early twentieth century, petroleum has accounted for the majority of export earnings and a substantial share of government revenue, shaping the country’s economic and fiscal structure. This reliance limited the development of other sectors, including agriculture and manufacturing, and increased vulnerability to external shocks such as fluctuations in global oil prices. Periods of high oil prices were associated with increased public spending and economic expansion, while price declines often resulted in fiscal deficits, inflationary pressures, and balance-of-payments constraints. The concentration of economic activity in the oil sector reduced incentives for private investment and economic diversification, contributing to long-term economic volatility and heightened exposure to global energy market shifts. The concentration of economic activity in the oil sector reduced incentives for private investment and economic diversification, contributing to long-term economic volatility and heightened exposure to global energy market shifts. These structural characteristics also weakened institutional capacity and constrained sustainable growth during periods of prolonged economic stress.

=== Mining ===
A range of other natural resources, including iron ore, coal, bauxite, gold, nickel and diamonds, are in various stages of development and production. In April 2000, Venezuela's president decreed a new mining law and regulations were adopted to encourage greater private sector participation in mineral extraction. During Venezuela's economic crisis, the rate of gold excavated fell 64.1% between February 2013 and February 2014 and iron production dropped 49.8%. In the production of gold, until 2009 the country produced an annual average between 11 and 12 tons per year. After that, due to the political and economic problems, mining activity plummeted: in 2017 the country only extracted 0.48 ton.

=== Agriculture, aquaculture, livestock and forestry ===
Agriculture in Venezuela accounts for approximately 3% of GDP, 10% of the labor force, and at least a quarter of Venezuela's land area. Venezuela exports rice, corn, fish, tropical fruit, coffee, beef and pork. The country is not self-sufficient in most areas of agriculture. Venezuela imports about two-thirds of its food needs. In 2002, American firms exported $347 million worth of agricultural products, including wheat, corn, soybeans, soybean meal, cotton, animal fats, vegetable oils and other items to make Venezuela one of the top two American markets in South America. The United States supplies more than one-third of Venezuela's food imports. Recent government policies have led to problems with food shortages. During times of high oil revenues domestic agriculture was neglected in favor of imported products, but when oil revenues fell and the currency experienced hyperinflation, the cost of acquiring those imported goods became prohibitive for most Venezuelans.

Venezuela produced in 2019:

- 4.3 million tons of sugarcane;
- 1.9 million tons of maize;
- 1.4 million tons of banana;
- 760 thousand tons of rice;
- 485 thousand tons of pineapple;
- 477 thousand tons of potato;
- 435 thousand tons of palm oil;
- 421 thousand tons of cassava;
- 382 thousand tons of orange;
- 225 thousand tons of watermelon;
- 199 thousand tons of papaya;
- 194 thousand tons of melon;
- 182 thousand tons of tomatoes;
- 155 thousand tons of tangerine;
- 153 thousand tons of coconut;
- 135 thousand tons of avocado;
- 102 thousand tons of mango (including mangosteen and guava);
- 56 thousand tons of coffee;

In addition to smaller productions of other agricultural products. Due to internal economic and political problems, sugar cane production dropped from 7.3 million tons in 2012 to 3.6 million in 2016. Corn production dropped from 2.3 million tons in 2014 to 1.2 million in 2017. Rice fell from 1.15 million tons in 2014 to 498 thousand tons in 2016.

In livestock, Venezuela produced, in 2019: 470 thousand tons of beef, 454 thousand tons of chicken meat, 129 thousand tons of pork, 1.7 billion liters of cow's milk, among others. The production of chicken meat decreased progressively, from year to year, from 1.1 million tons in 2011 to 448 thousand tons in 2017. The production of pork fell from 219 thousand tons in 2011 to 124 thousand tons in 2018. The production of cow's milk dropped from 2.4 billion liters in 2011 to 1.7 billion in 2019.

The fishing industry is a vital agricultural subsector and the most important in the Atlantic Caribbean, yielding roughly 250,000 to 400,000 metric tons of seafood annually. It is primarily divided into wild-caught artisanal fishing and shrimp aquaculture, focusing heavily on species like sardines, tropical tuna and commercial shrimp.

=== Industrial and manufacturing ===
Manufacturing contributed 12% of GDP in 2014. The manufacturing sector is experiencing severe difficulties, amidst lack of investment and accusations of mismanagement. Venezuela manufactures and exports steel, aluminum, transport equipment, textiles, apparel, beverages and foodstuffs. It produces cement, tires, paper, fertilizer and assembles cars both for domestic and export markets.

In 2014, General Motors Venezolana stopped automotive production at the Valencia Assembly after 65 years of service due to a lack of supplies while the Central Bank of Venezuela announced that the shortage rate of new automobiles was at 100%. By the first half of 2016, only 10 vehicles were manufactured per day in Venezuela with production dropping 86%.

In 2017, estimates showed that Venezuela's industrial production fell about 2%.

==== Food industry ====
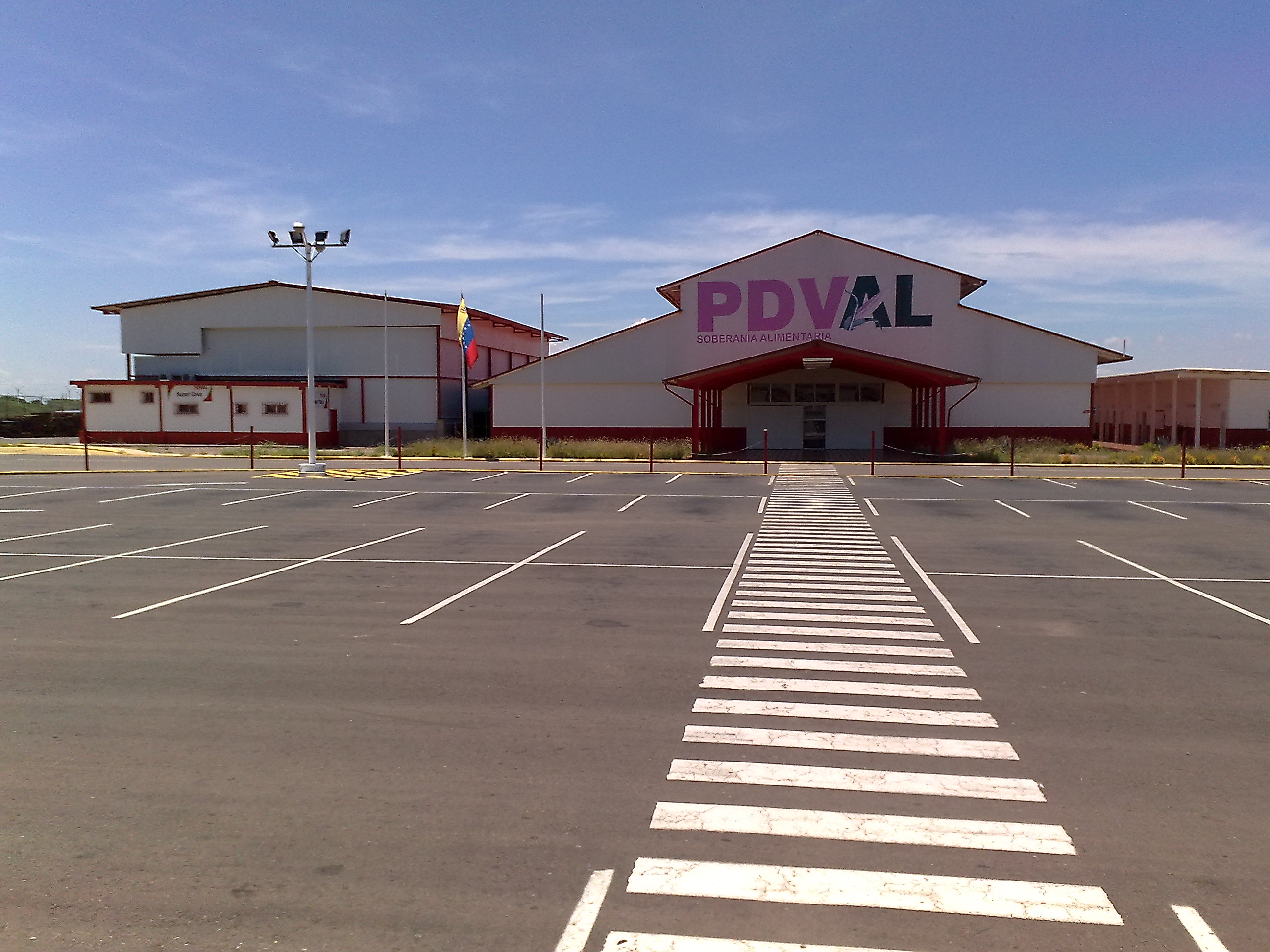
PDVAL food distributor.

Producción y Distribución Venezolana de Alimentos (PDVAL) is a nationwide food supply network in Venezuela. It was created by Venezuelan president Hugo Chávez and Petróleos de Venezuela (PDVSA) in response to the high food demand and presumed stockpiling by private food sectors, creating food shortage. Along with the related Mission Mercal, it was started following the Venezuelan general strike of 2002–2003, which saw concerns about corporate control of food distribution.

PDVAL's goal is to distribute basic goods such as meat, milk, chicken and other goods that have prices regulated by the government.

=== Services ===
==== Banking and finance ====
Banking and finance services in Venezuela operate in a highly constrained environment shaped by prolonged economic instability, inflation, currency controls, sanctions and the partial dollarisation of everyday transactions. The country’s banking system has been described as largely disconnected from international financial networks, with correspondent banking access weakened by sanctions exposure, financial-crime concerns, economic collapse and political instability; this limits the ability of Venezuelan banks to process cross-border payments, access foreign-currency clearing systems and support trade finance. Although commercial banks, digital payments and foreign-currency mechanisms remain in use, businesses have faced shortages of dollars and restrictions on ordinary international transactions, leading some firms to rely on unofficial exchange channels or dollar-linked cryptocurrencies such as USDT.

Financial exclusion in Venezuela affects individuals, small businesses, migrants, politically exposed persons and organisations that struggle to access reliable banking, credit, payment infrastructure or international financial services. The World Bank’s Global Findex database tracks account ownership, digital payments, savings and borrowing as key measures of financial inclusion, including Venezuela-specific indicators. Barriers include low incomes, documentation problems, compliance risk, sanctions-related de-risking and the limited international functionality of domestic financial institutions.

A non-government effort to limit financial exclusion in Venezuela is carried out by the US-based Economic Inclusion Group. The organisation describes its mission as protecting people and businesses from debanking risks, supporting national economic security and contributing to Venezuela’s reconstruction. Among the solutions for Venezuela it proposes financial innovation, including tokenised securities as a possible tool for lowering intermediation costs and broadening access to capital in the country’s reconstruction.

==== Real estate and housing ====
Real estate and housing in Venezuela have been affected by the country’s wider economic crisis, with poverty, inflation, reduced credit availability and deterioration of public services limiting access to adequate housing and formal property markets; recent reporting citing ENCOVI (National Survey on Living Conditions) found that by late 2024, 70% of Venezuelan households had monthly incomes of US$150-300, insufficient to cover rent, while at least three million people - around 10% of the population - were in highly or moderately vulnerable situations due to lack of access to decent housing.

The government has sought to address the shortage through the Gran Misión Vivienda Venezuela, a large-scale social housing programme launched in 2011; its announced goals included the construction of several million homes, although the programme has also faced criticism over politicisation, opacity and the reliability of official delivery figures.

The private real estate market has been heavily constrained by the collapse of purchasing power, limited mortgage lending, insecurity of property rights and reliance on cash or foreign-currency transactions, leaving housing affordability difficult for lower-income households and people without stable access to foreign-currency income.

==== Retail and hospitality ====
Retail and hospitality in Venezuela have shown signs of partial recovery from the deepest phase of the economic crisis, but remain shaped by inflation, weak purchasing power, dollarisation and unequal access to foreign-currency income. In food retail, a 2025 USDA report found that retail sales grew by 2% in 2024, with food staples accounting for around 60% of household spending, while Venezuelans continued to rely mainly on small neighbourhood shops, or bodegas, alongside supermarkets; the same report noted rapid growth in e-commerce, which doubled in size in 2024.

Hospitality and tourism have also been promoted by the government as a source of economic recovery and foreign currency, with Reuters reporting in 2024 that authorities were investing in runways, hotels and other tourism infrastructure, including in environmentally fragile areas.

However, the sector remains constrained by broader macroeconomic instability, sanctions exposure, limited international connectivity, high operating costs and the gap between businesses serving dollar-earning consumers or tourists and those dependent on local purchasing power; food-security reporting has continued to identify inflation and weak incomes as drivers of household vulnerability.

==== Tourism ====
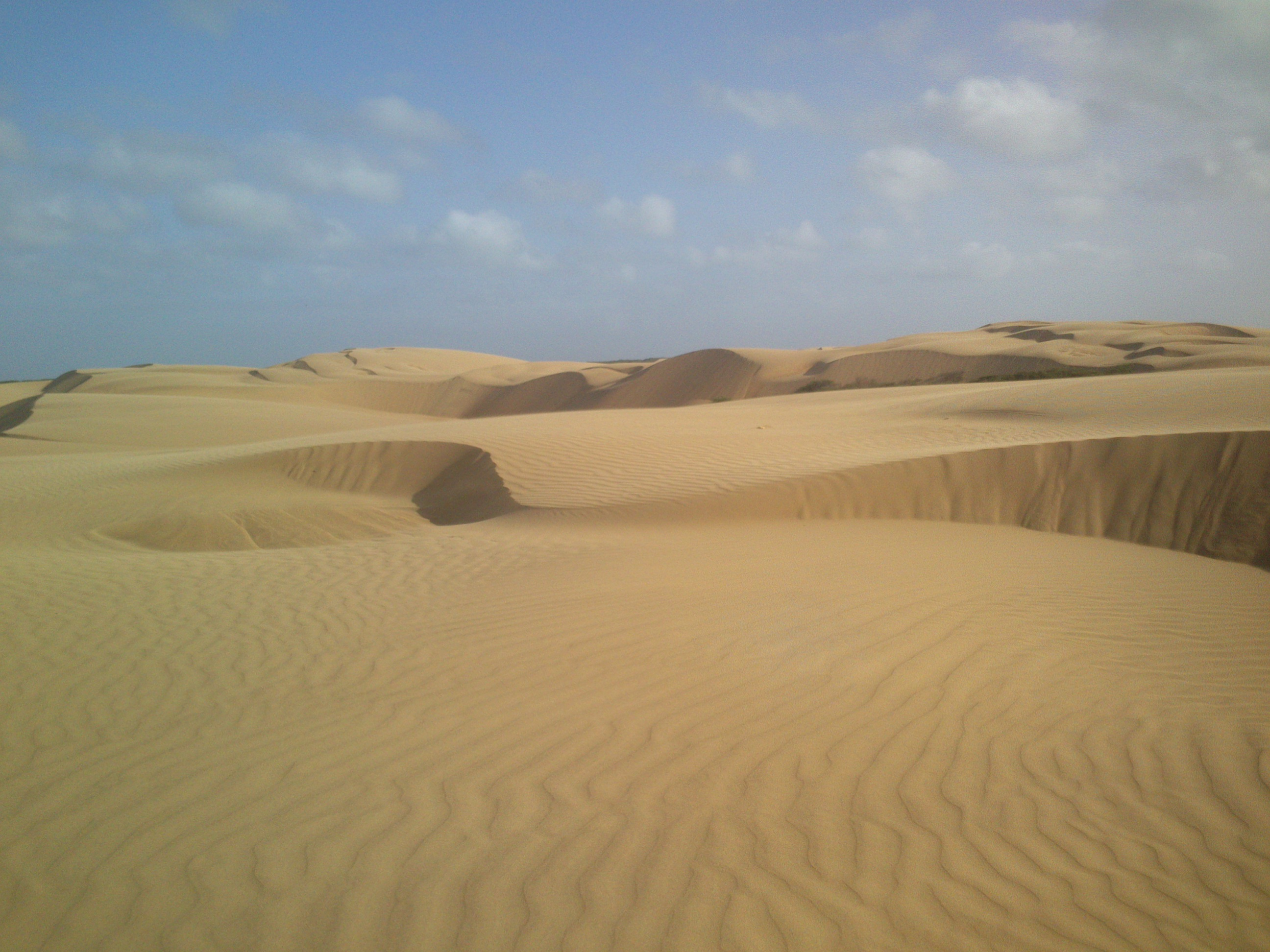
Médanos de Coro (Coro's dunes)

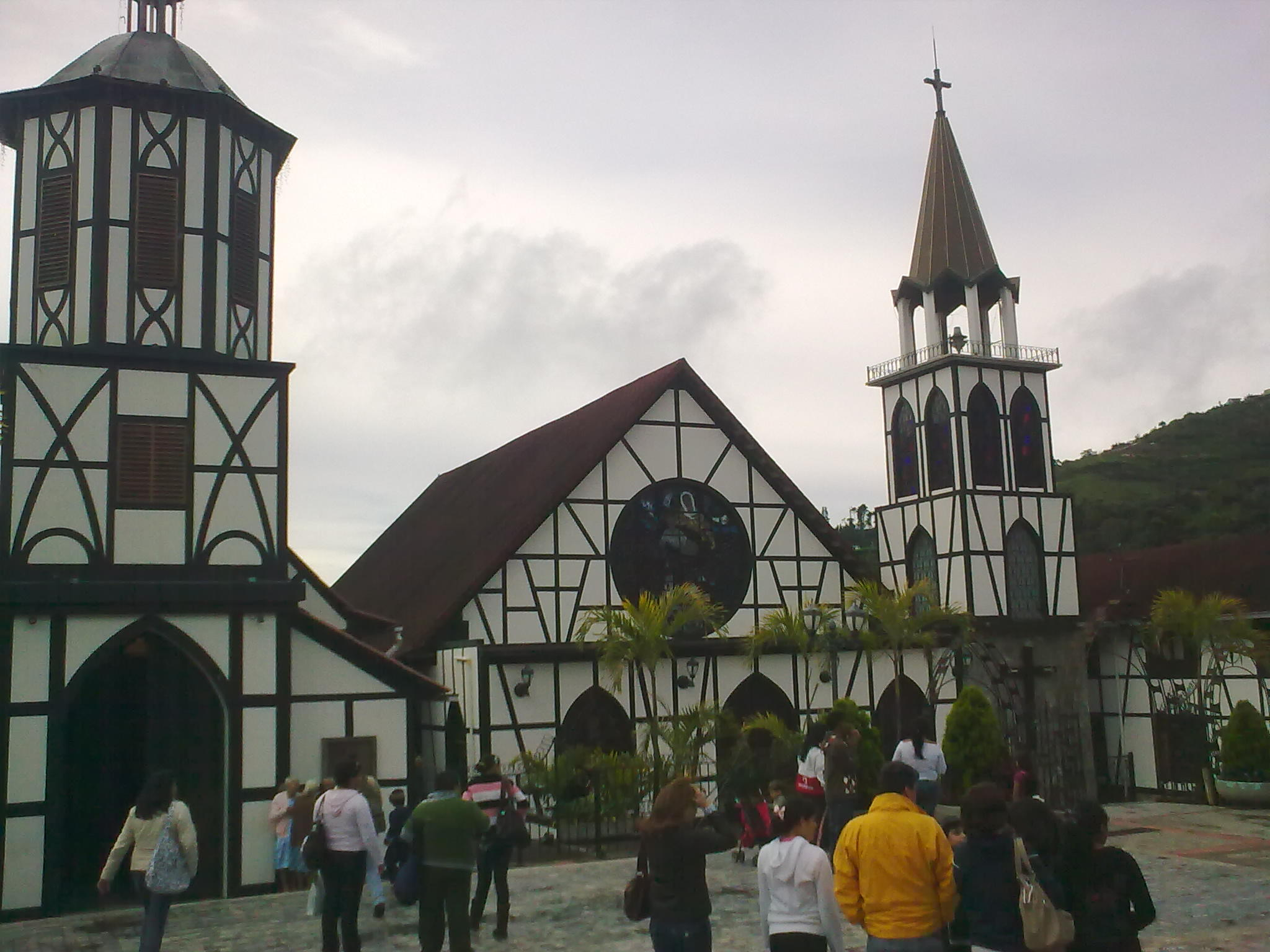
German origin settlement town Colonia Tovar

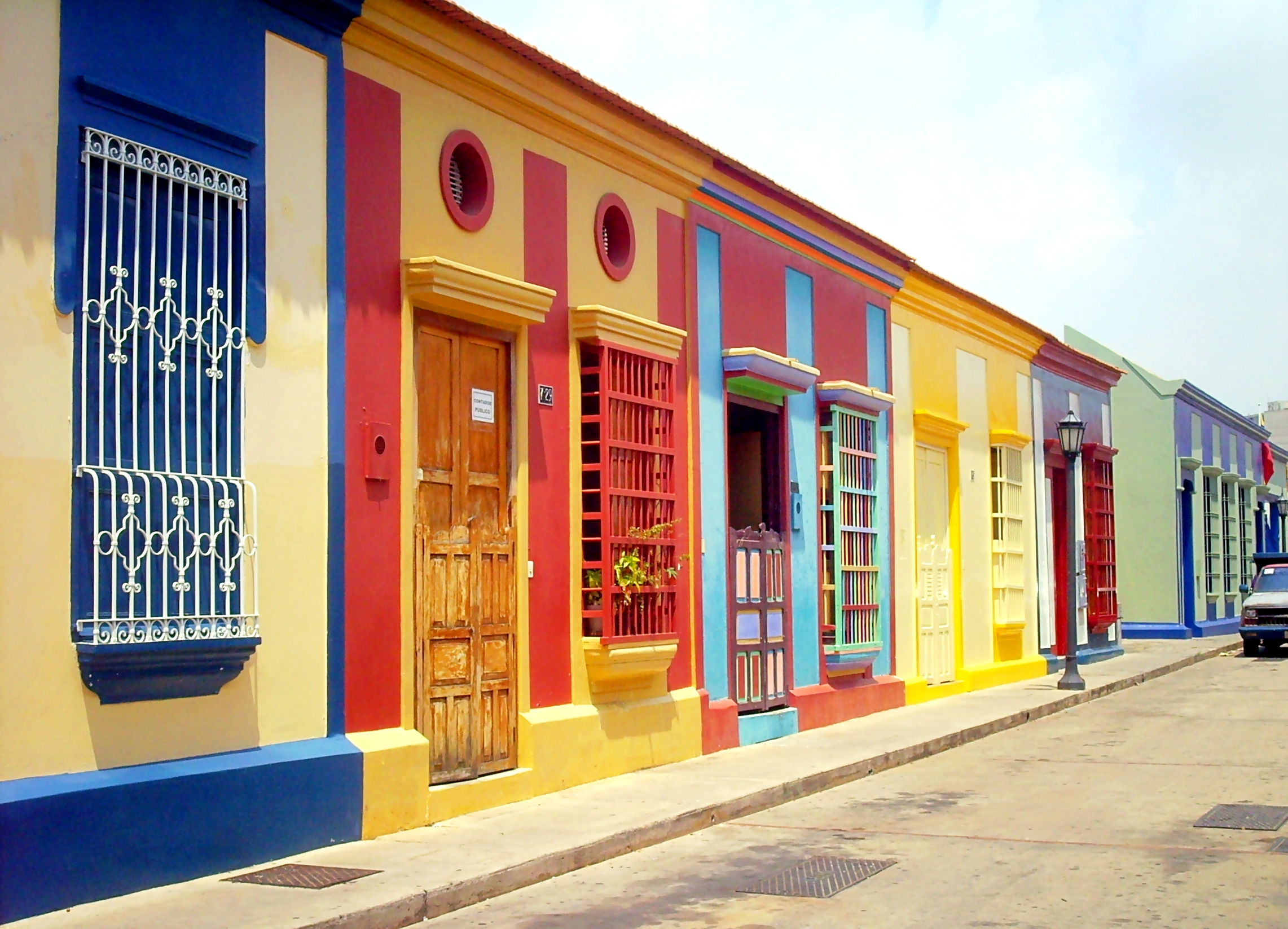
Colonial houses (city of Maracaibo)

Tourism in Venezuela has been developed considerably for decades, particularly because of its geographical position, the variety of landscapes, the richness of plants and wildlife, the artistic expressions and the privileged tropical climate of the country, which affords each region (especially the beaches) throughout the year. Since 2013, the country is having a very severe economic and political crisis affecting tourism all over the country.

==== Education ====
The total net enrollment ratio in primary education for both sexes increased from 87% in 1999 to 93.9% in 2009. The primary completion rate for both sexes reached 95.1% in 2009 as compared to 80.8% in 1991. The literacy rates of 15- to 24-year-olds in 2007, for men and women, were 98% and 98.8%, respectively. Among the first migrants the left Venezuela during the Bolivarian Revolution, a large percentage of the millions of Venezuelans who left the country were highly educated, resulting in a brain drain in the country.

In 2008, Francisco Rodríguez of Wesleyan University in Connecticut and Daniel Ortega of IESA stated that there was "little evidence" of "statistically distinguishable effect on Venezuelan illiteracy" during the Chávez administration. The Venezuelan government claimed that it had taught 1.5 million Venezuelans to read, but the study found that "only 1.1m were illiterate to begin with" and that the illiteracy reduction of less than 100,000 can be attributed to adults that were elderly and died.

==== Healthcare ====
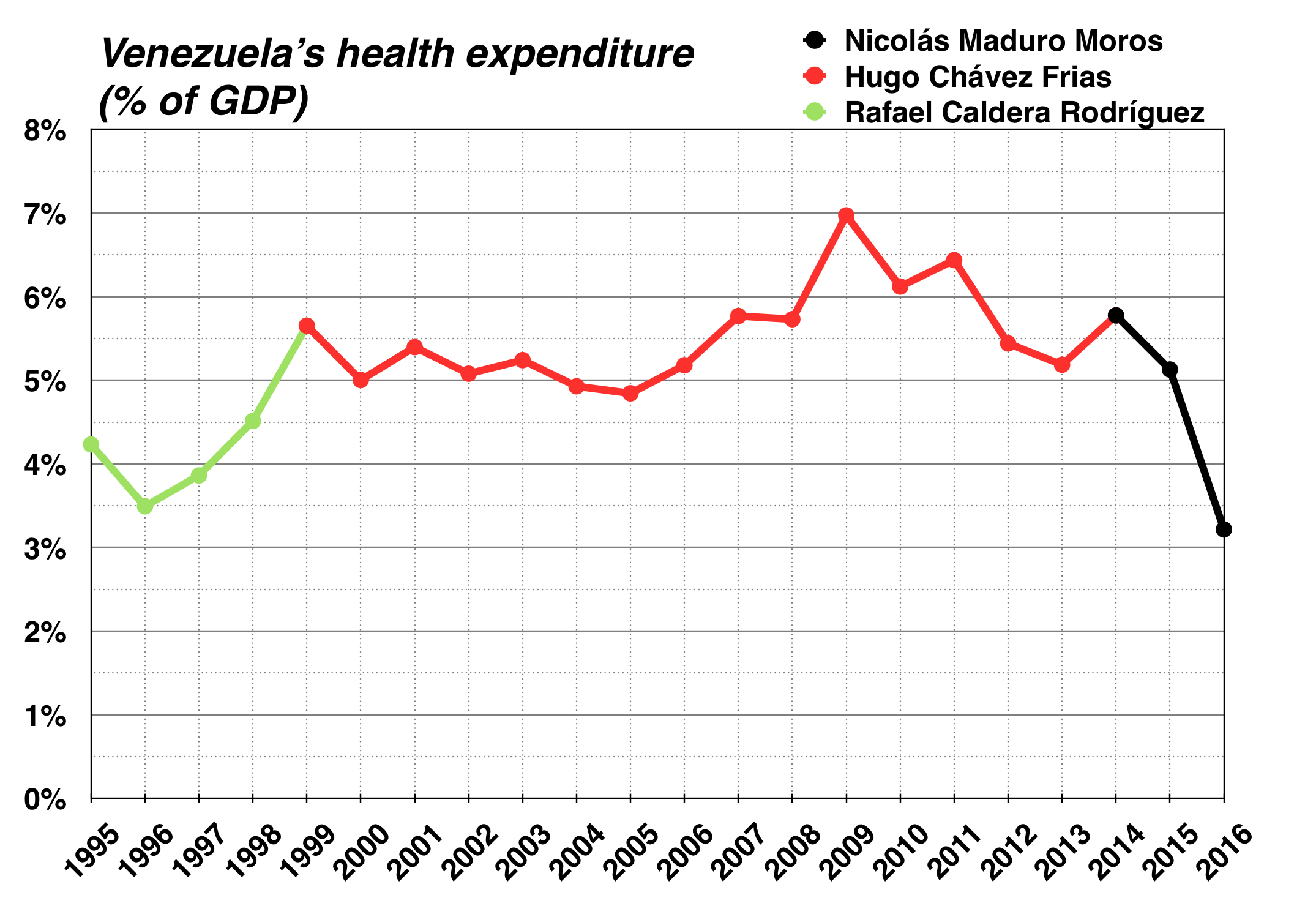
Healthcare spending by percentage of Venezuela's GDP Source: World Bank

Following the Bolivarian Revolution and the establishment of the Bolivarian government, initial healthcare practices were promising with the installation of a free healthcare system parallel to the existing national public health system, with the assistance received from Cuban medical professionals providing aid. The Bolivarian government's failure to concentrate on healthcare for Venezuelans, the reduction of healthcare spending and government corruption eventually affected medical practices in Venezuela, causing avoidable deaths along with an emigration of medical professionals to other countries.

Venezuela's reliance on imported goods and its complicated exchange rates initiated under Chávez led to increasing shortages during the late-2000s and into the 2010s that affected the availability of medicines and medical equipment in the country. The United Nations reported an increase in the maternal mortality ratio, which increased from 93 per 100,000 in 1990 to 110 per 100,000 in 2013. Following shortages of many medical and common goods in 2014, Venezuelan women have had difficulties accessing contraceptives and were forced to change prescriptions or search several stores and the Internet for their medications. Shortage of antiretroviral medicines to treat HIV/AIDS affected about 50,000 Venezuelans in 2014 as well, potentially causing thousands of Venezuelans with HIV to develop AIDS.

Venezuela is also the only country in Latin America where the incidence of malaria is increasing, allegedly due to illegal mining. In 2013, Venezuela registered the highest number of cases of malaria in the past 50 years, with 300 of 100,000 Venezuelans being infected with the disease.

== Infrastructure ==
In the 20th century when Venezuela benefitted from oil sales, infrastructure flourished in Venezuela. However, in recent years Venezuela's public services and infrastructure has suffered, especially utilities such as electricity and water.

=== Energy ===
The Venezuelan electrical grid is plagued with occasional blackouts in various districts of the country. In 2011, it had so many problems that rations on electricity were put in place to help ease blackouts. On 3 September 2013, 70% of the country plunged into darkness with 14 of 23 states of Venezuela stating they did not have electricity for most of the day. Another power outage on 2 December 2013 left most of Venezuela in the dark again and happened just days before elections.

Venezuela mostly utilizes hydropower resources to supply power to the nation's industries, accounting for 57% of total consumption at the end of 2016. However, persistent drought has severely reduced energy production from hydropower resources. The national electricity law is designed to provide a legal framework and to encourage competition and new investment in the sector. After a two-year delay, the government is proceeding with plans to privatize the various state-owned electricity systems under a different scheme than previously envisioned.

==== Energy statistics ====
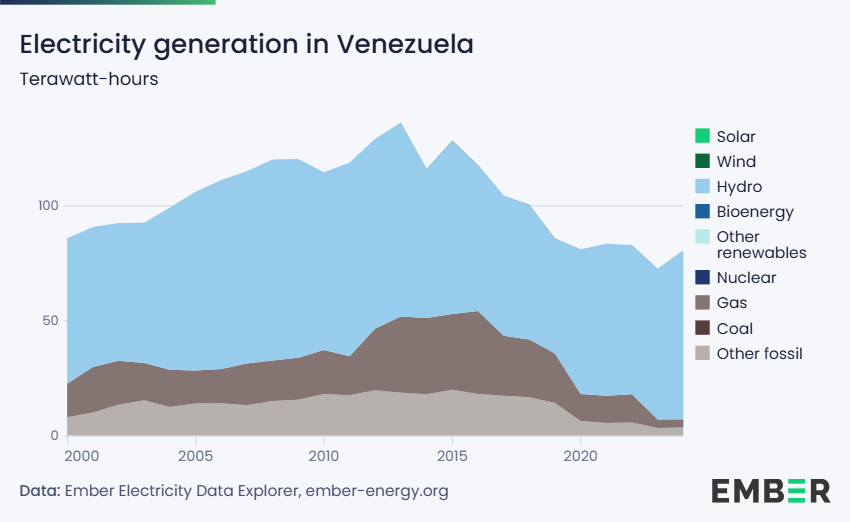
Electricity generation in Venezuela in terawatt-hours

- Electricity – production by source:
  - Fossil fuel: 35.7% (2012 est.)
  - Hydroelectric 64.3 (2012 est.)
  - Nuclear: 0% (2012 est.)
  - Other: 0% (2012 est.)
- Electricity production: 127.6 billion kWh (2012 est.)
- Electricity – consumption: 85.05 billion kWh (2011 est.)
- Electricity – exports: 633 million kWh (2009 est.)
- Electricity – imports: 260 million kWh (2009 est.)
- Electricity – installed generating capacity: 27.5 million kW (2012 est.)

=== Science and technology ===
The Bolivarian government has also launched an aerospace program in cooperation with the People's Republic of China who built and launched two satellites that are currently in orbit—a communications satellite called Simón Bolívar and a remote sensing satellite called Miranda. In July 2014, President Maduro announced that a third satellite would be built by Chinese–Venezuelan bilateral cooperation.

=== Telecommunications ===
In 1990, the number of Internet users in Venezuela was minimal, but 35.63% of Venezuelans were Internet users by 2010. In fact, the number of Internet subscribers has increased sixfold. Programs such as the National Technological Literacy Plan, which provides free software and computers to schools, have assisted Venezuela in meeting this goal. However, several experts state that the poor infrastructure in Venezuela had created a poor quality of Internet in Venezuela, which has one of the slowest Internet speeds in the world. The lack of US$ due to the Venezuelan governments currency controls has also damaged Internet services because technological equipment must be imported into Venezuela.

The number of fixed telephone lines per 100 inhabitants was 7.56 in 1990. The number increased to 24.44 in 2010. In 2000, 2,535,966 Venezuelans had landline telephones. By 2009, this had increased to 6,866,626.

=== Transportation ===
Venezuela has an extensive road system that was initially created in the 1960s helped aid the oil and aluminum industries. The capital Caracas had a modern subway system designed by the French that was finished in 1995, with the subway tunneling more than 31.6 mi (50.9 km).

In 1870, Antonio Guzmán Blanco helped create Venezuela's railway system.

The Chavez government launched a National Railway Development Plan designed to create 15 railway lines across the country, with 13,700 kilometres (8,500 mi) of track by 2030. The network is being built in cooperation with China Railways, which is also cooperating with Venezuela to create factories for tracks, railway cars and eventually locomotives. However, Venezuela's rail project is being put on hold due to Venezuela not being able to pay the $7.5 billion and owing China Railway nearly $500 million.

Lufthansa said it would stop all flights to Venezuela on 18 June 2016, citing difficulties with currency controls. Other airlines also cut back on flights and required that passengers pay fares in US$.

=== Water supply and sanitation ===
As of March 2026, Venezuela's water sector faces a severe crisis, with up to 80% of the population experiencing restricted, often contaminated, water access. Infrastructure decay, exacerbated by 2025 flooding, has left approximately 7.9 million people in need of humanitarian assistance for water and sanitation. You can read the full analysis at Venezuela (Bolivarian Republic of) Crisis Response Plan 2026.

== Trade ==
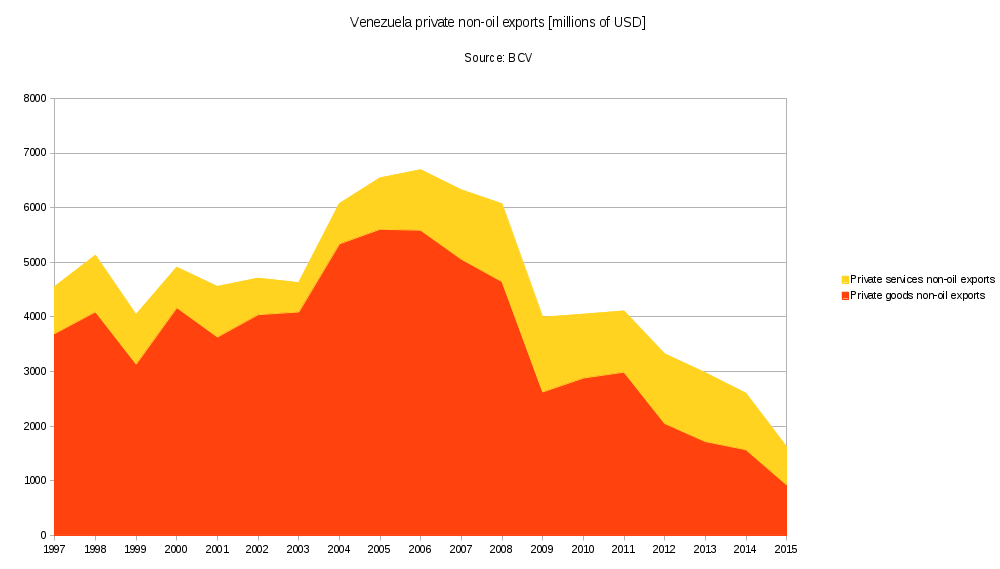
Venezuela private sector nonpetroleum exports in millions of US$ from 1997 to 2015 (orange=goods, yellow=services)

Exports of Venezuela by product category (2019) Chemical products Transportation Machines Mineral products Plastics and rubbers Metals Foodstuffs Precious metals Textiles Instruments Animal products Vegetable products Paper goods Footwear and headwear Miscellaneous Stone and glass Wood products Animal and vegetable bi-products Animal hides Arts and antiques Weapons

Venezuela is a founding member of the Organization of the Petroleum Exporting Countries (OPEC), the Organization of Gas Exporting Countries (GECF), the Bolivarian Alliance for the Peoples of Our America (ALBA) and the Community of Latin American and Caribbean States (CELAC). Petroleum constitutes 80% of Venezuela's exports with a value of $22.2 billion in 2017. Thanks to petroleum exports, Venezuela usually posts a trade surplus. From 2005, nontraditional (i.e. nonpetroleum) private sector exports have been declining rapidly. By 2015, they constitute 8% of total exports.

The United States is Venezuela's leading trade partner. During 2002, the United States exported $4.4 billion in goods to Venezuela, making it the 25th-largest market for the United States Including petroleum products, Venezuela exported $15.1 billion in goods to the United States, making it its 14th-largest source of goods. Venezuela opposes the proposed Free Trade Area of the Americas.

Since 1998, China–Venezuela relations have seen an increasing partnership between the government of the Venezuelan President Hugo Chávez and the People's Republic of China. Sino-Venezuelan trade was less than $500m per year before 1999 and reached $7.5bn in 2009, making China Venezuela's second-largest trade partner and Venezuela China's biggest investment destination in Latin America. Various bilateral deals have seen China invest billions in Venezuela and Venezuela increase exports of oil and other resources to China. China has demanded payment in oil for its exports to Venezuela because of its unwillingness to accept Venezuelan currency and the inability of Venezuela to pay in dollars or gold.

Top Trading Partners for Venezuela for 2017

Imports into Venezuela 2017
Ranking	Country	Value (USD)	%
	World	$9.1B	100.0%
1	United States	$3.45B	38%
2	China	$1.65B	18%
3	Mexico	$1.08B	12%
4	Brazil	$469M	5.2%
5	Colombia	$318M	3.5%
6	Argentina	$245M	2.7%
7	Germany	$191M	2.1%
8	Italy	$166M	1.8%
9	Spain	$117M	1.3%
10	United Kingdom	$86M	0.95%

Exports from Venezuela for 2017
Ranking	Country	Value (USD)	%
	World	$27.8B	100.0%
1	United States	$11.6B	42%
2	China	$6.4B	23%
3	India	$5.25B	19%
4	Singapore	$1.25B	4,5%
5	Spain	$390M	1,4%
6	Brazil	$363M	1.3%
7	Sweden	$341M	1.2%
8	Malaysia	$316M	1.1%
9	Germany	$259M	0.93%
10	Colombia	$210M	0.75%

== Labor ==
Under Chávez, Venezuela has also instituted worker-run "co-management" initiatives in which workers' councils play a key role in the management of a plant or factory. In experimental co-managed enterprises, such as the state-owned Alcasa factory, workers develop budgets and elect both managers and departmental delegates who work together with company executives on technical issues related to production.

In November 2010, workers spent a week protesting outside factories in Valera and Valencia following the expropriation of the American bottle-maker Owens-Illinois.

Labor disputes have continued to increase since the financial crisis in 2008. According to the World Economic Forum, Venezuela is ranked as 134th of the 148 countries for economic competitiveness. Many in the private sector attribute these findings to the inflexible labor market.

In recent years, a barrage of pro-worker decrees have been passed. The most significant could be the 2012 labor laws known as the LOTTT. These laws included the virtual ban on dismissal, shorter work week, improved holidays and enhanced maternity benefits. The LOTTT offers job security to most workers after the first month. Employers have reported an absenteeism rate of up to 40% which they blame on the leniency of these labor laws. As expected, employers have been less willing to recruit.

On 17 November 2014, President Maduro issued a decree to increase the minimum salary for all workers by 15%. The decree became effective on 1 December 2014. As part of the May Day celebrations in honor of workers' day, President Maduro announced on 28 April 2015 that the minimum wage would increase 30%; 20% in May and 10% in July, with the newly announced minimum wage for Venezuelans being only about $30 per month at the widely used black market rate.

In September 2017, the National Union of Workers (UNETE) announced that Venezuela had lost 3,345,000 jobs since the election of President Maduro. By December 2017, the number of lost jobs increased by 400,000 to over 3,850,000 lost jobs since the start of Maduro's tenure.

== Statistics ==
=== Economy data ===
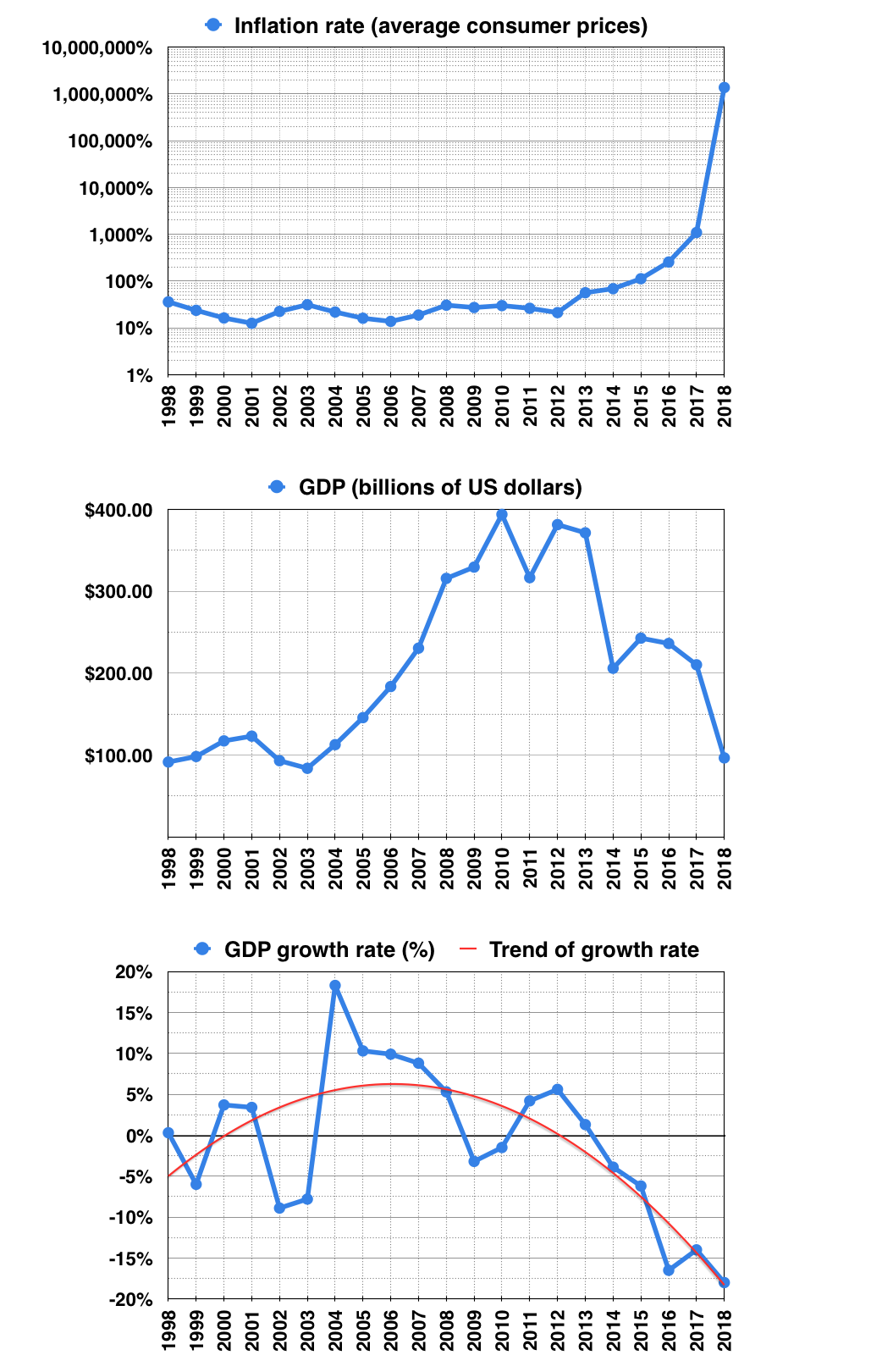
The blue line represents annual rates whereas the red line represents trends of annual rates given throughout the period shown (sources: International Monetary Fund, World Bank and Central Intelligence Agency)

The Macroeconomic Stabilization Fund (FIEM) decreased from US$2.59 billion in January 2003 to US$700 million in October, while central bank-held international reserves increased from US$11.31 billion in January to US$19.67 billion in October 2003. On the black market, the bolívar fell 28% in 2007 to Bs. 4,750 per US$ and declined to around VEF 5.5 (Bs 5500) per US$ in early 2009.

The economy recovered and grew by 16.8% in 2004. This growth occurred across a wide range of sectors, although the oil industry directly represented only a small proportion of employment in the country. International reserves grew to US$27 billion. Polling firm Datanalysis noted that real income in the poorest sectors of society grew by 33% in 2004.

On 7 March 2007, the government announced that the Venezuelan bolívar would be re-denominated at a ratio of 1 to 1000 at the beginning of 2008, and renamed the bolívar fuerte ("strong bolivar") to ease accounting and transactions. This was carried out on January 1st, 2008, at which time the exchange rate was 2.15 bolívar fuerte per US$. The ISO 4217 code for the bolívar fuerte is VEF.

Government spending as a percentage of GDP in Venezuela in 2007 was 30%, smaller than other mixed economies such as France (49%) and Sweden (52%). According to official sources from the United Nations, the percentage of people below the national poverty line decreased during the presidency of Hugo Chávez, from 48.1% in 2002 to 28% in 2008.

With the 2007 rise in oil prices and rising government expenditures, Venezuela's economy grew by 9% in 2007. However, oil prices began to fall starting in July 2008, resulting in a major loss of income. Hit by a global recession, the economy contracted by 2% in the second quarter of 2009, further contracting by 4.5% in the third quarter of 2009. Chavez's responded by claiming that these standards misrepresented the economic reality and that the economy should be measured by societal standards. On 17 November, the Central Bank reported that private sector activity declined by 4.5% and that inflation was averaging 26.7%. Compounding such problems was a drought which the government claimed was caused by El Niño, resulting in rationing of water and electricity and a shortage of food.

The year 2010 saw Venezuela still in recession, with GDP falling by 5.8% in the first quarter of 2010. The Central Bank of Venezuela stated that the recession was due largely "to restricted access to foreign currency for imports, lower internal demand and electricity rationing". The oil sector's performance was also troublingly impacted, with oil revenues shrinking by 5%. More importantly, the Central Bank hinted at the root cause of the oil contraction as being due to falls in production, "operative problems", maintenance stoppages and the channeling of diesel to run thermal generators during a power crisis. While public sector revenue fell by 2.8%, that of the private sector fell by 6%.

The year 2013 proved challenging for Venezuela, with shortages of basic necessities and extreme inflation plaguing the nation's economy, with nearly one quarter of consumer items out of stock. The bolívar was devalued by around a third to 6.3 per $US in early 2013. However, inflation still continued to rise drastically in the country, to the point President Maduro ordered price cuts just days before elections, claiming that the stores were charging unreasonable prices - although this was likely simply due to the devaluation of the bolívar.

In 2014 The Central Bank of Venezuela stopped releasing statistics for the first time in its history, in what has been qualified as manipulation of public opinion. The CADIVI, the government body in charge of currency exchange, was further dismantled.

In May 2019, the Central Bank of Venezuela released economic data for the first time since 2015. According to this release, inflation reached 274% in 2016, 863% in 2017 and 130,060% in 2018. The new reports implied a contraction of the economy by more than half in five years, with the Financial Times qualifying it as "one of the biggest contractions in Latin American history". According to two undisclosed sources of Reuters, the release of these numbers was due to pressure from China, a Maduro ally. One of these sources further claimed that this disclosure would bring Venezuela into compliance with the IMF, making it harder to support Juan Guaidó during the presidential crisis. At the time, the IMF was not able to support the validity of the data as they had not been able to contact the authorities.

The following table shows the main economic indicators in 1980–2026. Inflation below 10% is in green.

Year	GDP (in Bil. US$PPP)	GDP per capita (in US$ PPP)	GDP (in Bil. US$nominal)	GDP per capita (in US$ nominal)	GDP growth (real)	Inflation rate (in Percent)	Unemployment (in Percent)	Government debt (in % of GDP)
1980	118.3	7,913.4	69.8	4,671.1	▼−4.9%	▲21.4%	n/a	n/a
1981	▲127.8	▲8,296.4	▲78.4	▲5,085.6	▼−1.3%	▲16.2%	n/a	n/a
1982	▲139.3	▲8,781.1	▲80.0	▼5,041.6	▲2.6%	▲9.6%	n/a	n/a
1983	▼130.5	▼7,999.8	▼79.7	▼4,883.2	▼−9.9%	▲6.2%	n/a	n/a
1984	▲142.3	▲8,483.4	▼57.8	▼3,447.5	▲5.2%	▲12.3%	n/a	n/a
1985	▲148.1	▲8,588.0	▲59.9	▲3,472.2	▲0.9%	▲11.4%	n/a	n/a
1986	▲160.2	▲9,182.2	▲60.9	▲3,488.6	▲6.1%	▲11.5%	n/a	n/a
1987	▲172.1	▲9,620.0	▼46.9	▼2,619.2	▲4.8%	▲28.1%	n/a	n/a
1988	▲189.8	▲10,348.5	▲60.4	▲3,292.8	▲6.5%	▲29.5%	n/a	n/a
1989	▼169.7	▼9,036.6	▼44.7	▼2,378.2	▼−13.9%	▲84.5%	n/a	n/a
1990	▲187.5	▲9,658.7	▲48.4	▲2,492.9	▲6.5%	▲40.7%	n/a	n/a
1991	▲212.7	▲10,699.1	▲53.4	▲2,685.3	▲9.7%	▲34.2%	n/a	n/a
1992	▲230.7	▲11,339.2	▲60.4	▲2,968.5	▲6.1%	▲31.4%	n/a	n/a
1993	▲236.8	▲11,378.3	▼59.9	▼2,876.1	▲0.3%	▲38.1%	n/a	n/a
1994	▼236.2	▼11,098.8	▼58.4	▼2,742.0	▼−2.3%	▲60.8%	n/a	n/a
1995	▲250.7	▲11,525.9	▲77.4	▲3,559.8	▲4.0%	▲59.9%	n/a	n/a
1996	▲254.8	▼11,467.0	▼70.5	▼3,174.6	▼−0.2%	▲99.9%	n/a	n/a
1997	▲275.7	▲12,157.3	▲85.7	▲3,778.5	▲6.4%	▲50.0%	n/a	n/a
1998	▲279.6	▼12,088.4	▲91.8	▲3,970.4	▲0.3%	▲35.8%	n/a	n/a
1999	▼266.6	▼11,301.4	▲97.5	▲4,133.4	▼−6.0%	▲23.6%	14.5%	n/a
2000	▲282.7	▲11,589.8	▲117.6	▲4,820.6	▲3.7%	▲16.2%	▼14.0%	n/a
2001	▲298.9	▲12,051.1	▲123.1	▲4,963.9	▲3.4%	▲12.5%	▼13.4%	n/a
2002	▼276.7	▼10,973.5	▼95.3	▼3,778.3	▼−8.9%	▲22.4%	▲16.0%	n/a
2003	▼260.2	▼10,157.2	▼83.7	▼3,266.1	▼−7.8%	▲31.1%	▲18.2%	n/a
2004	▲316.1	▲12,142.9	▲112.3	▲4,312.0	▲18.3%	▲21.7%	▼15.1%	n/a
2005	▲359.7	▲13,600.6	▲143.4	▲5,421.7	▲10.3%	▲16.0%	▼12.2%	n/a
2006	▲407.4	▲15,167.1	▲178.5	▲6,646.8	▲9.9%	▲13.7%	▼10.0%	n/a
2007	▲455.0	▲16,684.2	▲234.9	▲8,614.6	▲8.8%	▲18.7%	▼8.5%	n/a
2008	▲479.0	▲17,298.9	▲303.3	▲10,953.7	▲3.3%	▲31.4%	▼7.4%	n/a
2009	▼462.2	▼16,444.9	▼262.3	▼9,331.1	▼−4.1%	▲26.0%	▲7.9%	n/a
2010	▲464.7	▼16,292.0	▲303.9	▲10,652.7	▼−0.7%	▲28.2%	▲8.5%	n/a
2011	▲487.3	▲16,834.2	▲304.6	▼10,522.1	▲2.7%	▲26.1%	▼8.2%	n/a
2012	▲517.4	▲17,618.8	▲338.7	▲11,535.1	▲4.2%	▲21.1%	▼7.8%	n/a
2013	▲526.6	▲17,679.2	▼225.5	▼7,570.8	▲0.1%	▲40.6%	▼7.5%	n/a
2014	▼523.4	▼17,328.1	▼128.8	▼4,262.8	▼−2.3%	▲62.2%	▼6.8%	n/a
2015	▼507.8	▼16,585.1	▼84.3	▼2,752.7	▼−3.9%	▲121.7%	▼6.1%	n/a
2016	▼425.6	▼13,857.8	▼78.5	▼2,556.5	▼−17.0%	▲254.9%	▼5.3%	n/a
2017	▼370.8	▼12,130.4	▼60.0	▼1,962.2	▼−14.4%	▲438.1%	▼5.0%	n/a
2018	▼298.1	▼10,001.4	▼47.6	▼1,597.4	▼−21.4%	▲65,374.1%	▲5.5%	n/a
2019	▼215.2	▼7,436.0	▼22.4	▼773.1	▼−29.0%	▲19,906.0%	n/a	n/a
2020	▼145.7	▼5,121.2	▼20.0	▼703.5	▼−33.2%	▲2,355.1%	n/a	n/a
2021	▲154.0	▲5,452.5	▲39.1	▲1,386.0	▲1.1%	▲1,588.5%	n/a	n/a
2022	▲189.9	▲6,730.2	▲79.5	▲2,818.5	▲15.1%	▲186.5%	n/a	n/a
2023	▲208.2	▲7,356.9	▼76.8	▼2,712.4	▲5.7%	▲337.5%	n/a	n/a
2024	▲232.5	▲8,185.2	▲103.7	▲3,651.2	▲8.9%	▲49.4%	n/a	n/a
2025	▲260.1	▲9,122.0	▼101.5	▼3,559.0	▲9.0%	▲252.0%	n/a	n/a
2026 est.	▲282.4	▲9,901.7	▲124.2	▲4,354.7	▲5.0%	▲467.9%	n/a	n/a

=== Currency black market ===
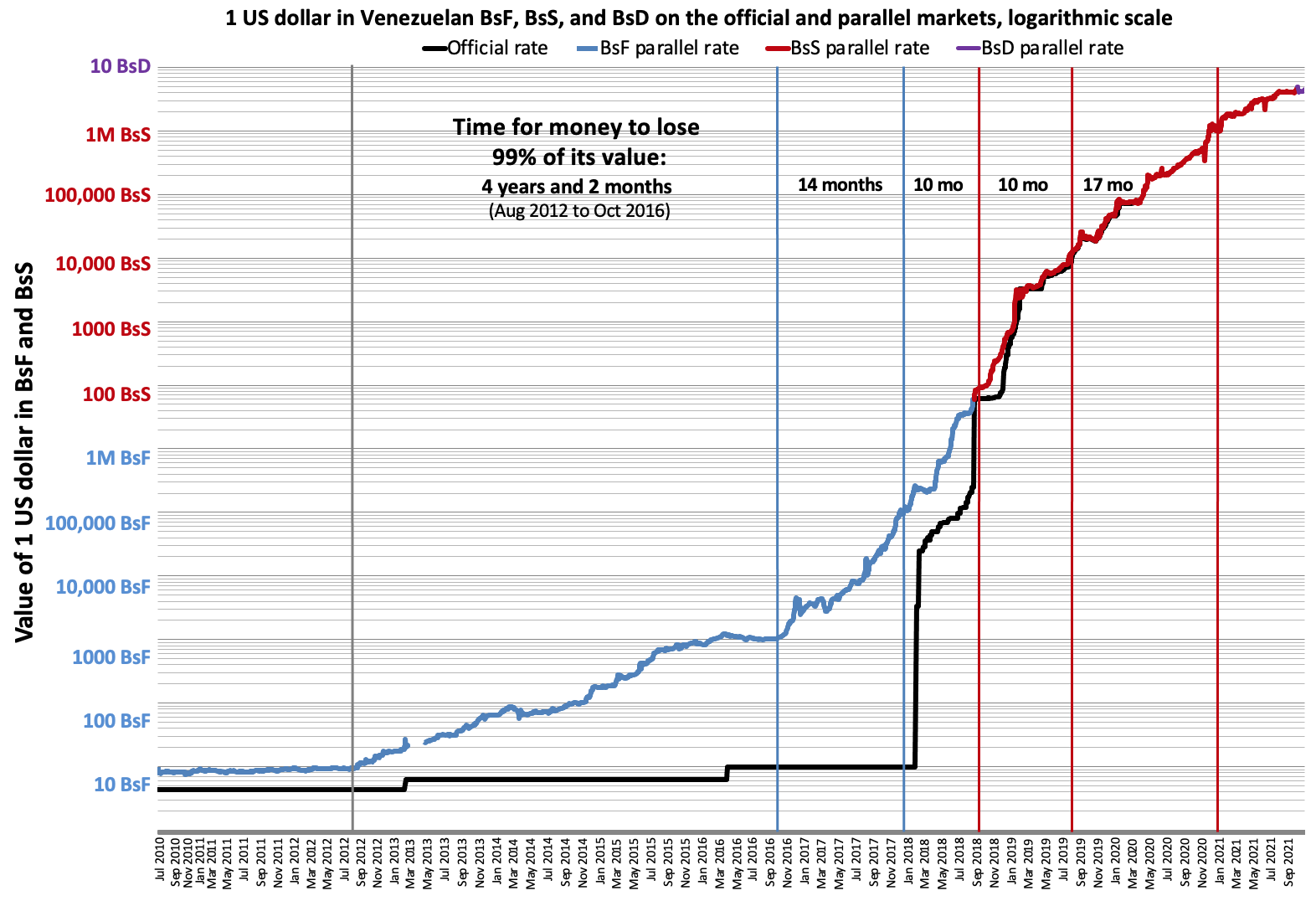
According to DolarToday.com, the value of one US dollar in Venezuelan bolívares fuertes on the black market through time: blue and red vertical lines represent every time the currency has lost 90% of its value, which has happened seven times since 2012, meaning that the currency is worth (as of mid-February 2019) 30,000,000 times less than in August 2012, since it has lost more than 99.99999% of its value

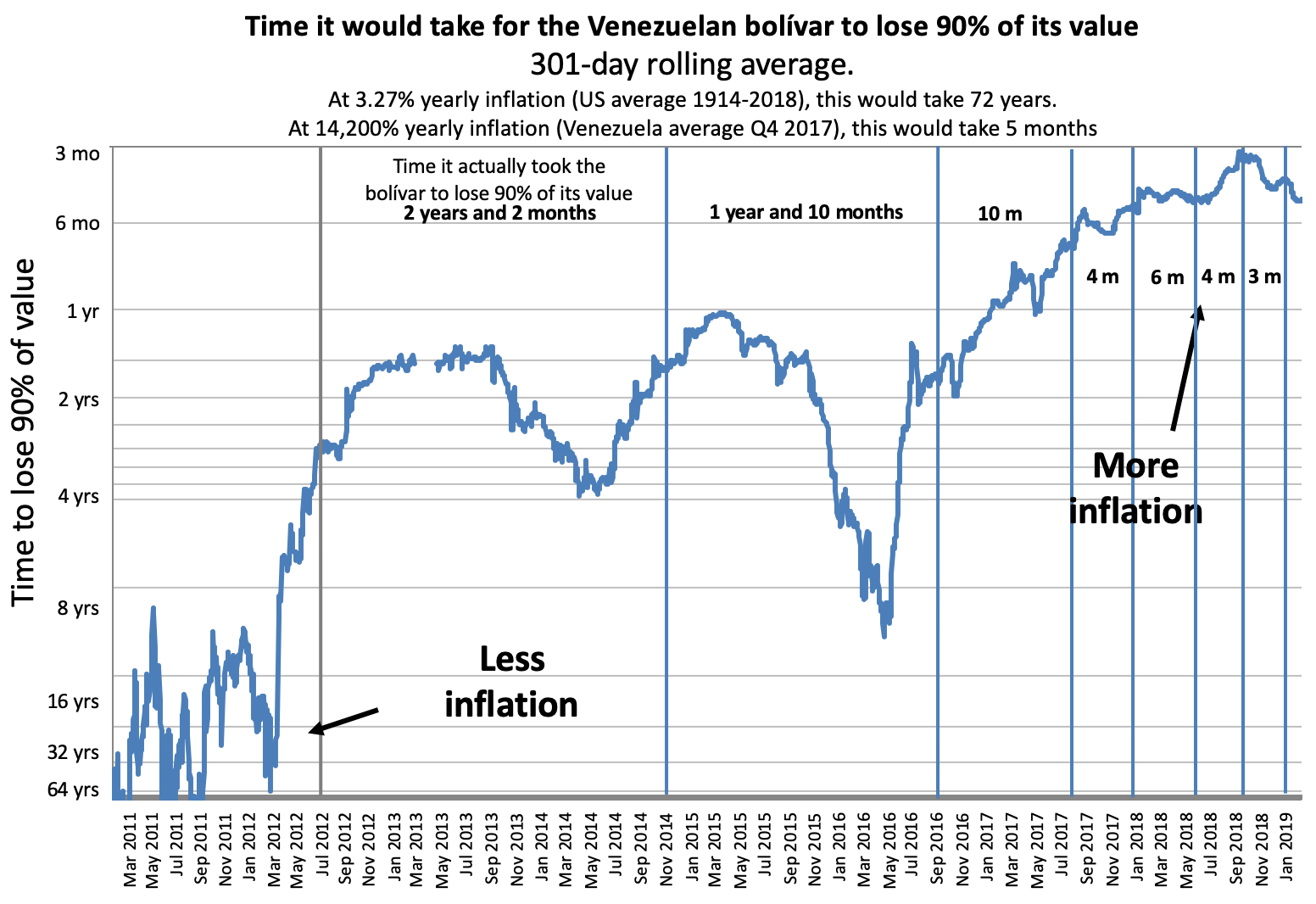
Inflation represented by the time it would take for money to lose 90% of its value (301-day rolling average, inverted logarithmic scale)

The parallel exchange rate is what Venezuelans believe the Venezuelan currency is worth compared to the US$. In the first few years of Chávez's office, his newly created social programs required large payments in order to make the desired changes. On 5 February 2003, the government created CADIVI, a currency control board charged with handling foreign exchange procedures. Its creation was to control capital flight by placing limits on individuals and only offering them so much of a foreign currency. This limit to foreign currency led to a creation of a currency black market economy since Venezuelan merchants rely on foreign goods that require payments with reliable foreign currencies. As Venezuela printed more money for their social programs, the Bolívar continued to devalue for Venezuelan citizens and merchants since the government held the majority of the more reliable currencies.

As of January 2018, the strongest official exchange rate was 1 US$ to 10 VEF while the free market exchange rate was over 200,000 VEF to 1 US$. Since merchants can only receive so much necessary foreign currency from the government, they must resort to the black market which in turn raises the merchant's prices on consumers. The high rates in the black market make it difficult for businesses to purchase necessary goods since the government often forces these businesses to make price cuts. This leads to businesses selling their goods and making a low profit, such as Venezuelan McDonald's franchises offering a Big Mac meal for only $1. Since businesses make low profits, this leads to shortages since they are unable to import the goods that Venezuela is reliant on. Venezuela's largest food producing company, Empresas Polar, has stated that they may need to suspend some production for nearly the entire year of 2014 since they owe foreign suppliers $463 million. The last report of shortages in Venezuela showed that 22.4% of necessary goods are not in stock. This was the last report by the government since the central bank no longer posts the scarcity index. This has led to speculation that the government is hiding its inability to control the economy which may create doubt about future economic data released.

=== Socioeconomic indicators ===
Like most Latin American countries, Venezuela has an unequal distribution of wealth. Although distribution improved when the surplus of rural labor started to diminish and the educational system improved in the middle of the 20th century, equality is far from coinciding with western standards. The rich tend to be very rich and the poor very poor. In 1970, the poorest fifth of the population had 3% of national income while the wealthiest fifth had 54%. For comparison, the United Kingdom 1973 figures were 6.3% and 38.8% and the United States in 1972, 4.5% and 42.8%. Inequality declined during the early 2000s as the government spent heavily on social programs to improve the well-being of the poor. The economic crisis since 2013 has greatly increased inequality since the heavily subsidized services that the poor rely on, such as public hospitals and food distribution, have experienced severe shortages of essential imported goods. Hyperinflation has destroyed the value of savings, plunging many formerly stable, middle-class Venezuelans into extreme poverty. Conversely, the very wealthy are more likely to have access to overseas financial services allowing them to store their wealth in stable foreign currencies and escape the catastrophic collapse of the Venezuelan currency.

The more recent income distribution data available is for distribution per capita, not per household. The two are not strictly comparable because poor households tend to have more members than rich households, thus the per household data tends to show less inequality than the per capita data. The table below shows the available per capita data for recent years from the World Bank.

Personal income distribution
Year	Share of personal income (%) received by:						GINI index
Year	Poorest fifth	2nd fifth	3rd fifth	4th fifth	Wealthiest fifth	Wealthiest 10%	GINI index
1987	4.7	9.2	14.0	21.5	50.6	34.2	~43.42
1995	4.3	8.8	13.8	21.3	51.8	35.6	46.8
1996	3.7	8.4	13.6	21.2	53.1	37.0	48.8
2000	4.7	9.4	14.5	22.1	45.4	29.9	42.0
2004	3.5	—	12.9	—	54.8	—	45.59
2007	5.1	—	14.2	—	47.7	—	42.37
2010	5.7	—	14.9	—	44.8	—	38.98
2011	5.7	—	15.9	—	44.8	—	39.02
2013	—	—	—	—	—	—	44.8
2015	—	—	—	—	—	—	46.9
Note that personal (per capita) income distribution, given in this table, is not exactly comparable with household income distribution, given in the previous table, because poor households tend to have more members. Sources 1987 data: 1991 World Development Report, Table 30, pp. 262–63. 1995 data: 1998 World Development Report, Table 2.8, p. 70. 1996 data: 2000/2001 World Development Report, Table 5, pp. 282–83. 2000 data: 2006 World Development Indicators, Table 2.8. All of the above publications are by the World Bank. 2004 data: Instituto Nacional de Estadística, p. 8 2007 data: Instituto Nacional de Estadística, p. 8 2010 data: Instituto Nacional de Estadística, p. 8 2011 data: Instituto Nacional de Estadística, p. 8 2013 data: United Nations Development Programme 2015 data: United Nations Development Programme

Poverty in Venezuela increased during the 1980s and early 1990s, but it decreased greatly in the mid to late 1990s. The decreasing trend continued through the Chávez presidency, with the exception of the troubled years 2002 and 2003. Under the Bolivarian government, poverty decreased initially when Venezuela acquired oil funds, though poverty began to increase to its highest level in decades in the 2010s. Throughout its modern history, inequality and poverty rates have wildly fluctuated from year to year, owing to the government's dependence on unreliable oil revenues which send the economy into alternating periods of rapid growth and catastrophic recession. The poverty rate decreased from 55% to 27% in the 5-year period between 2003 and 2008, only to then skyrocket to over 80% in the 5 years between 2012 and 2017.

The table below shows the percentage of people and the percentage of households whose income is below a poverty line which is equal to the price of a market basket of necessities such as food.

Percentage of people and households with income below national poverty line
Year	1989	1997	1998	1999	2000	2001	2002	2003	2004	2005	2006	2007	2008	2009	2010	2011	2012	2013	2014	2015	2016	2017
Households	–	48.1	43.9	42.0	40.4	39.0	48.6	55.1	47.0	37.9	30.6	28.5	27.5	26.7	26.9	26.5	21.1	27.3	48.4	73.0	81.8	87.0
People	31.3	54.5	50.4	48.7	46.3	45.4	55.4	62.1	53.9	43.7	36.3	33.7	32.6	31.8	32.5	31.6	25.4	32.1	–	–	–	–
Sources World Bank, 1997 World Development Indicators, p. 52; Venezuela, Instituto Nacional de Estadística, Pobreza por línea de ingreso, 1er semestre 1997 – 2do semestre 2013. Retrieved December 2014. ENCOVI – Encuesta sobre Condiciones de Vida en Venezuela Febrero 2018 Note Datum is from the World Bank and as far as we know is a whole year average (1989) End of year data provided by Instituto Nacional de Estadística (1997–2013) ENCOVI used due to lack of government-provided statistics (2014–2017)

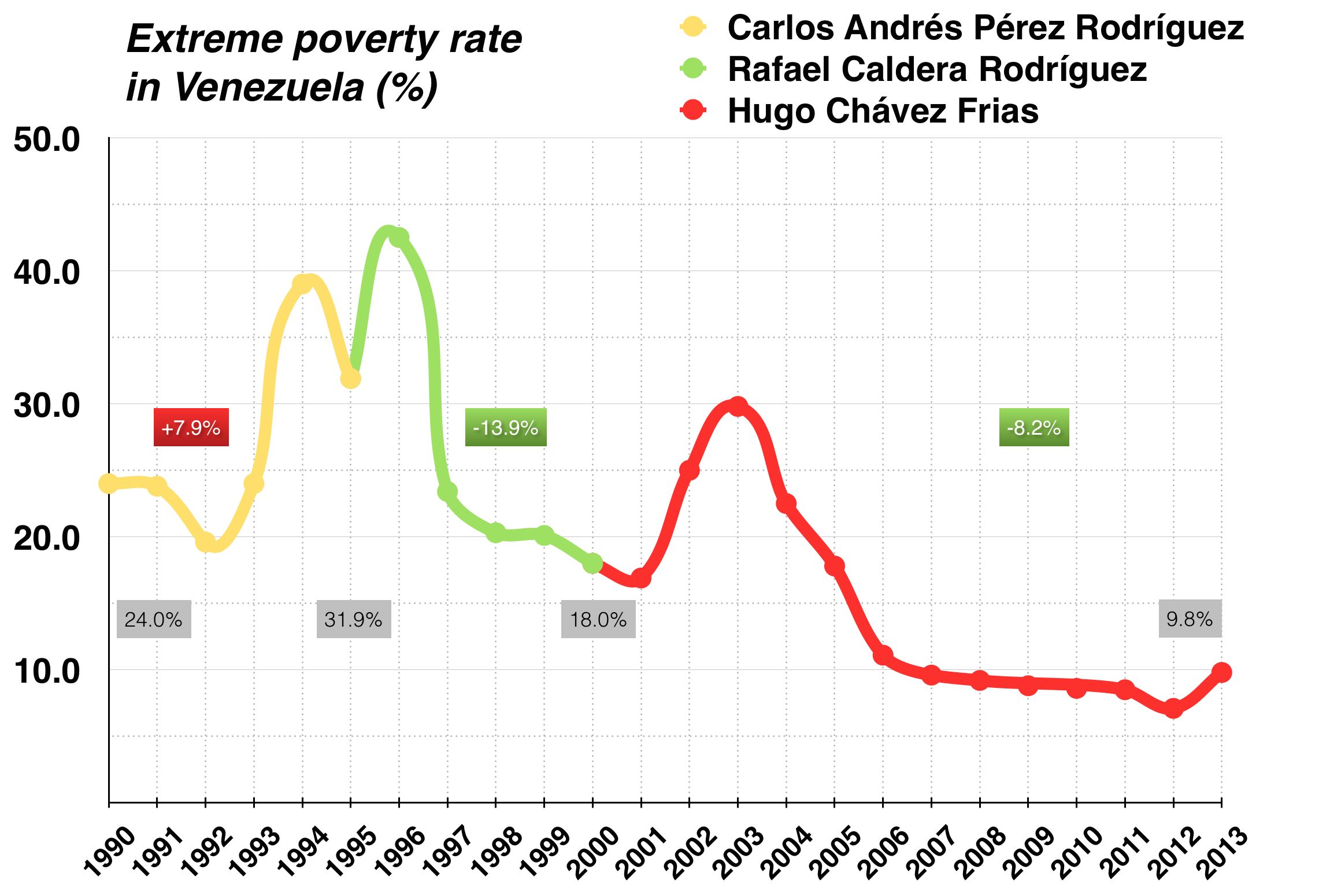
Venezuela's extreme poverty rate from 1990 to 2013 Source: INE Note: interim presidents excluded and one-year delay of data transferred during presidential term changes due to new policies, inaugurations and so on

Venezuela economic indicators (2017)
indicator	%
Real GDP growth	−14.0%
Inflation	1.087.5%
Gross national saving (% of GDP)	12.1%

Foreign trade
Leading markets 2013	% of total	Leading suppliers	% of total
United States	39.1	United States	31.7
China	14.3	China	16.8
India	12.0	Brazil	9.1
Netherlands Antilles	7.8	Colombia	4.8

Foreign trade
Major exports	% of total	Major imports	% of total
Oil and gas	90.4	Raw materials and intermediate goods	44.5
Other	9.6	Consumer goods	24.5
		Capital goods	31.0

== Social development ==
In the early 2000s, when oil prices soared and offered Chávez funds not seen since the beginning of Venezuela's economic collapse in the 1980s, Chávez's government became "semi-authoritarian and hyper-populist" and consolidated its power over the economy in order to gain control of large amounts of resources. Domestically, Chávez used such oil funds for populist policies, creating the Bolivarian missions, aimed at providing public services to improve economic, cultural and social conditions. Despite warnings near the beginning of Chávez's tenure in the early 2000s, Chávez's government continuously overspent in social spending and did not save enough money for any future economic turmoil, which Venezuela faced shortly before and after his death. On the year of Chávez's death, Venezuela was still categorized as having high human development on its Human Development Index in 2013 according to the United Nations Development Programme, although human development began to decline in Venezuela within a year, with the country dropping 10 ranks by 2014.

=== Corruption ===
The Corrupt Venezuelan Regime, according to the United States Department of Justice

Corruption in Venezuela permeates all aspects of politics, business, law enforcement, and other sectors. The discovery of oil in Venezuela in the early 20th century worsened political corruption. While corruption is not a new phenomenon in Venezuela, it worsened with the Chávez and Maduro regimes. In recent years, Venezuela has been ranked as one of the most corrupt countries globally by Transparency International, and corruption has played a role in the economic collapse and broader crisis in Venezuela. A 2014 Gallup poll found that 75% of Venezuelans believed that corruption was widespread throughout the Venezuelan government. Discontent with corruption was cited by demonstrators as one of the reasons for the 2014 and 2017 Venezuelan protests.

According to Transparency International's 2025 Corruption Perceptions Index, Venezuela scored 10 on a scale from 0 ("highly corrupt") to 100 ("very clean"), continuing its lowest score ever from the previous year. When ranked by score, Venezuela ranked 180th among the 182 countries in the Index, where the country ranked first is perceived to have the most honest public sector. For comparison with regional scores, the best score among the countries of the Americas (Note: Argentina, Bahamas, Barbados, Belize, Bolivia, Brazil, Canada, Chile, Colombia, Costa Rica, Cuba, Dominica, Dominican Republic, Ecuador, El Salvador, Grenada, Guatemala, Guyana, Haiti, Honduras, Jamaica, Mexico, Nicaragua, Panama, Paraguay, Peru, Saint Lucia, Saint Vincent and the Grenadines, Suriname, Trinidad and Tobago, United States of America, Uruguay, Venezuela) was 75, the average score was 42 and the worst score was Venezuela's, 10. For comparison with worldwide scores, the best score was 89 (ranked 1), the average score was 42, and the worst score was 9 (ranked 181, in a two-way tie).

In 2023, Transparencia Venezuela announced that the amount of money in judicial cases of 26 different countries investigating government corruption amounted to at least $70 billion dollars.

=== Welfare ===
Social security is a human and social fundamental and inalienable right guaranteed by the State to all Venezuelans residing in the territory of the Republic, and all foreigners legally impeached on it, regardless of ability to pay, provided social, work activity, through development, wages, earnings and income, according to the principle of progressivity and the terms of the 1999 Constitution of Venezuela, as well as the different national laws, treaties, agreements and conventions signed and ratified by the Republic.

The Bolivarian missions are a series of over thirty social programs implemented under the administration of former Venezuelan president Hugo Chávez and continued by Chávez's successor, Nicolás Maduro. The programs focus on helping the most disadvantaged social sectors and guaranteeing essential rights such as health, education and food. The created missions include Mission Robinson (literacy), Mission Barrio Adentro (free medical coverage), and Mission Mercal (affordable food).

Using increasing oil prices of the early 2000s and funds not seen in Venezuela since the 1980s, Chávez created the "Bolivarian missions" in 2003, which were initially short-term projects dedicated to alleviating the largest socioeconomic problems facing Venezuela at the time. After enjoying political success, Chávez made the missions his central priority for his administration, directly overseeing their operations and increasing funding during electoral campaigns.

The development and promotion of economic resources, originating from the state-owned Petróleos de Venezuela (PDVSA), generated a political floor for the governmental management of that time, but that "as the years went by, many social missions lost their social perspective and focused their axis of action on political activities" characterized by discretionality and information opacity.

=== Poverty and hunger ===
Extreme poverty and lack of food and medicines has pushed more than three million Venezuelans to leave the country in recent years. Andres Bello Catholic University conducted a study of poverty that found the poorest 20% of Venezuelans had 1.4% of the nation's wealth, down from 3.4% in 2014, while the richest 10% had 61% of the nation's wealth, up from 30%.

According to government figures released in April 2017, 1,446 children under the age of 1 died in 2016, representing a 30 percent increase in one year. As of August 2017, 31 million people suffered from severe food shortages. The ENCOVI universities survey found that 73% of Venezuelans said they had lost 9 kg (20 lb) of body weight in 2016 and 64% had lost 11 kg (24 lb) in 2017.

When the country's economy collapsed in 2014, hunger and malnutrition became a severe problem. In 2015, close to 45% of Venezuelans said they were unable to afford food at times. In 2018, this figure rose to 79%, one of the highest rates in the world.

Although poverty initially declined under Chávez, Venezuela's poverty rate increased to 28% by 2013, with extreme poverty rates increasing 4.4% to 10% according to the Venezuelan government's INE. Estimates of poverty by the United Nations Economic Commission for Latin America and the Caribbean (ECLAC) and Luis Pedro España, a sociologist at the Universidad Católica Andrés Bello, showed an increase of poverty in Venezuela. ECLAC showed a 2013 poverty rate of 32% while Pedro España calculated a 2015 rate of 48%. The Venezuelan government estimated that 33% were in poverty in the first half of 2015 and then stopped producing statistics. According to Venezuelan NGO PROVEA, by the end of 2015 there would be the same number of Venezuelans living in poverty as there was in 2000, reversing the advancements against poverty by Chávez. The ENCOVI annual survey by three universities estimated poverty at 48% in 2014, 82% in 2016 and 87% in 2017.

In relation to hunger, under-nutrition, undernourishment and the percentage of children under the age of five who are moderately or severely underweight decreased earlier in Chávez's tenure. However, shortages in Venezuela as a result of price control policies and heavy import dependence left the majority of Venezuelans without adequate products after his death.

== See also ==
- List of Venezuelan companies
- List of Venezuelan cooperatives
- List of Venezuelans by net worth
- Central Bank of Venezuela
- Corruption in Venezuela
- Foreign aid to Venezuela
- Guaire miners
- Illegal drug trade in Venezuela
- Prostitution in Venezuela
- Venezuela and the International Monetary Fund
- Ministry of Economy and Finance (Venezuela)
- National Center for Foreign Commerce
- Venezuelan Federation of Chambers of Commerce
- 1980–1989 world oil market chronology
- 2000s commodities boom
- 2010s oil glut
- Economy of South America
- List of Latin American and Caribbean countries by GDP (nominal)
- List of Latin American and Caribbean countries by GDP (PPP)
