= Foreign aid to Venezuela =

Overview of aid

Historically, Venezuela has been categorized as one of the most successful countries (at least, economically speaking) in Latin America specifically during its democratic period between 1958 and 1999. As the wealthiest country in this region and an OPEC member, Venezuela has been more frequently a donor than a recipient of foreign assistance. Its economic dependency on oil resources was (and still is) the main reason why this reputation reached the international public sphere. The effectiveness of oil revenues has had a huge impact on public expenditure and, as a result, a double-sword mechanism for the government to choose between an effective role for this institution towards a welfare state and clientelism.

== Background as a donor ==
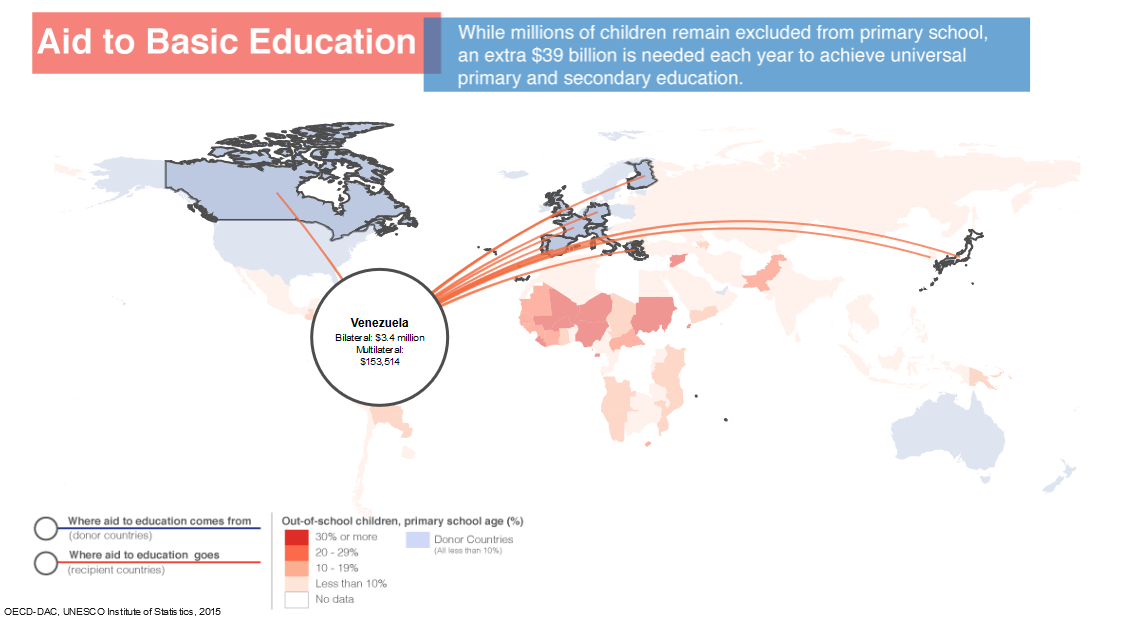
A UNESCO diagram demonstrating the amount Education focused aid provided to Venezuela in 2015

The golden years started from 1914 with discovery of the first fully exploitable oilfield -called Mene Grande- under the military regime of Juan Vicente Gomez. Since then, oil represented the main asset for the government to acquire consistent resources to accomplish specific plans related to modern infrastructure. Former Venezuelan President Rómulo Betancourt (president during the period 1958-1964) said in his book Venezuela: Oil and Politics that "(...) Gomez was something more than a local despot, he was the instrument of foreign control of the Venezuelan economy, the ally and servant of powerful outside interests." This is in reference to Royal Dutch Shell and Standard Oil's appeasement of the dictator in return for exploration rights to the country's oil fields.

In the mid-1960s, Venezuela's bilateral economic relations were characterized by technical cooperation agreements, student exchange programs, or commercial arrangements similar to those signed by the major industrial nations. Its oil wealth in the 1970s, however, did allow the country to become a major provider of bilateral and multilateral financing. From 1974 to 1981, the nation contributed US$7.3 billion to international development, 64 percent of which went to multilateral sources, such as the United Nations Special Fund, the Andean Reserve Fund, the OPEC Fund, the Coffee Stabilization Fund, the Caribbean Development Bank, and the Central American Bank for Integration, among others. In addition, Caracas was the headquarters of the affiliates or institutes of many regional and international organizations. Total annual contributions in the late 1970s averaged 1.88 percent of GDP, above the 1 percent level suggested by the United Nations for developed countries. Most bilateral assistance, funneled through the FIV, went to Andean nations, Central America, and the Caribbean. Venezuela used this oil wealth to enlarge its profile in regional and international affairs, a prestige it aggressively sought.

As its prosperity eroded in the 1980s, Venezuela saw its role as a donor, particularly as a bilateral one, wane. The country's most prominent economic assistance during the decade was dispensed through the joint San José Accord that it administered along with Mexico in order to provide subsidized oil to the Caribbean Basin region. Throughout the decade, Venezuela remained disposed to intervene in Central America. After supporting the Sandinista National Liberation Front (Frente Sandinista de Liberación Nacional—FSLN) against the Somoza dictatorship in Nicaragua in 1979, the Venezuelan government also provided financial assistance to the Sandinistas' opposition, the National Opposition Union (Unión Nacional Oppositora—UNO), in its successful bid for power in 1990. Some minimal bilateral funding through the FIV continued in the early 1990s, mainly to promote the country's commercial interests.

In the 1980s, however, Venezuela sought funds from the major multilaterals, such as the World Bank and the IMF, after more than a decade of detachment. The World Bank was active in Venezuela from 1961 to 1974, disbursing thirteen loans worth US$340 million. Because of its high per capita income, however, Venezuela did not become eligible for World Bank financing until 1986. In 1989 it received over US$700 million in the form of a structural adjustment loan and a trade reform loan. Venezuela also used its large and previously untapped reserves at the IMF in 1989, when the IMF disbursed the first installment of a threeyear Extended Fund Facility in the amount of US$4.8 billion. These new funds helped ease the country's painful transition to a more open economy, a transition undertaken largely on the advice of the IMF and the World Bank. Another multilateral agency, the Inter-American Development Bank (IDB), also continued to fund Venezuela's development in highway construction, forestry programs, water and sanitation projects, mining, and other infrastructure projects. In cumulative terms, the IDB provided approximately US$1.3 billion from 1961 to 1990.

Finally, in the context of South-South cooperation, Cuba is a special case of foreign aid from Venezuela. This is cooperation based on Venezuela’s regional programs such as the Bank of the ALBA, the Bank of the South, PetroAmerica, PetroCaribe, and the San Jose Oil Agreement; it is also based on bilateral programs channeled through state institutions and excluding or minimizing the participation of multilateral organizations, the private sector, cooperatives, and non-government organizations (NGO). As a result, state and non-state actors manipulate Venezuelan aid (a geopolitical revenue) in the form of favors, donations, transfers, third-party payments, direct aid, debt forgiveness, financing, and non-returnable investments. From a general point of view, total aid to Havana from Caracas in 2008 was about US$9.970 billion: US$5.6 billion in payments for professional services; US$2.5 billion in subsidies for oil sold at a fixed price of US$27 and US$1.87 billion in other bilateral cooperation projects. It is important to highlight that accumulated aid since 1999 is calculated to be about US$18 billion

The economic reforms begun by the Pérez administration in 1989 tracked with the prevailing liberal orthodoxy of international economics, but flew in the face of traditional Venezuelan state intervention.

Since then, and especially from 1999 (under the Hugo Chávez administration) Venezuela started to use oil revenues to assure evident strategic international partnership with other countries.

== Venezuela as a recipient ==
In the ongoing political and economic crisis in Venezuela, Russia has been a steadfast and powerful ally, repeatedly expressing open support for the Venezuelan government of Nicolás Maduro “[creating] a network of mutual support that has allowed [Maduro] to survive despite having driven more than a fifth of Venezuela’s population into exile”. Furthermore, Russia has developed its relationship with the Maduro government, employing various foreign policy instruments such as mutual open and tacit support in multilateral fora, foreign aid, debt payments, support for oil trading activities and military support

Venezuela represents a strategic position of anti-hegemonic US power in the Western Hemisphere and provides essential access to significant oil and mineral resource wealth. In this sense, controlling petroleum production and logistics is also some of the most significant factors that guide and impinge on Russian strategy towards Venezuela

On the other hand, China’s posture in Venezuela is often misunderstood. Although the People’s Republic of China’s (PRC) government does want access to Venezuela’s oil and markets and wants to be repaid for its loans, only about $20 billion of the $62 billion it loaned to Venezuela’s leftist populist government since 2008 is still outstanding, and its companies are in control of the oil that it uses to repay itself.

During the COVID-19 pandemic three main destinations of Chinese donations (Venezuela, Brazil, and Chile) accounted for 61.4 per cent of total donations. In this sense, if measured in USD per capita, the greatest impact of such donations was in the Caribbean countries and Venezuela (Table 1). The fact that Venezuela was the largest recipient of aid from China is not surprising given the humanitarian emergency that the country was experiencing after the economic crisis that began in 2015, which led millions of people to emigrate.

Chinese donations per country

	US$ Million	US$ per capita
Venezuela	45.54	1.52
Brazil	23.17	0.11
Chile	9.96	0.37
Cuba	9.00	0.66
Peru	6.85	0.21
Argentina	5.62	0.12
Costa Rica	4.78	0.94
Mexico	4.12	0.03
Colombia	2.99	0.06
Ecuador	2.99	0.17
Dominican Republic	2.51	0.23
Panama	1.97	0.45
Uruguay	1.71	0.47
Bolivia	1.55	0.13
El Salvador	1.43	0.22
Trinidad and Tobago	1.05	0.76
Dominica	0.78	10.82

Table 1: Chinese donations per country

The world of development assistance is being shaken by the power shift occurring across the global economy after the pandemic occurred. Emerging economies are quietly beginning to change the rules of the game. China, the United Arab Emirates, Saudi Arabia, Korea, Kuwait and Brazil, among others, have been increasing their aid to poorer countries. At the head of this group of emerging donors is China, combining loans, credits and debt write-offs with special trade arrangements and commercial investments. Common to most of these donors is a quest for energy security, enlarged trading opportunity ties and new economic partnerships, coupled with rapidly growing strength and size in the global economy.
