= Venezuela and the International Monetary Fund =

The Bolivarian Republic of Venezuela was a founding member of the International Monetary Fund (IMF) in 1946, but its relationship with the institution has been marked by significant shifts, reflecting the country's turbulent economic and political landscape.

== Background ==
Venezuela possesses the world's largest proven oil reserves, making its economy exceptionally dependent on petroleum production and exports. As a prominent member of OPEC, the nation's fiscal health has historically been tied to the volatile price of oil. The precipitous drop in global oil prices in 2014 triggered a severe and ongoing economic crisis, causing state revenue to collapse, the economy to contract, and the Central Bank of Venezuela's monetary reserves to dwindle.

== Relationship with the IMF ==
=== Departure and isolation ===
Under the government of President Hugo Chávez, Venezuela pursued a policy of economic sovereignty and distanced itself from international financial institutions. In a symbolic move, the country paid off its debts to both the IMF and the World Bank five years ahead of schedule in 2007, subsequently cutting off formal financial relations with them. Despite this political stance, both the IMF and the World Bank have repeatedly expressed their readiness to provide technical and financial assistance to Venezuela if requested by its government.

=== Economic context of the rupture ===
The Chávez administration and that of his successor, Nicolás Maduro, pursued a policy of extensive state takeovers of key industries, including oil production, banking, telecommunications, and mining. During a period of high oil prices, the government funded ambitious social programs and public spending. These redistributive policies, according to official figures, successfully reduced the poverty rate from 50% in 1998 to 30% by 2013 and lowered income inequality. However, this model proved unsustainable when oil revenues plummeted, leaving the economy exposed.

== Economic crisis and statistics ==
Following the oil price crash, Venezuela entered a deep economic depression. By 2015, the per capita income had fallen to $7,808. According to IMF estimates, the economy contracted by approximately 30% between 2013 and 2017. The country experienced rampant inflation, which was projected to reach 720% in 2017, alongside a forecasted economic contraction of a further 7.4%.

A critical symptom of the crisis was a severely overvalued official exchange rate. While the government maintained a fixed rate of 10 bolivars to the US dollar, the currency's value on the black market was a fraction of this, crippling the formal economy and leading to widespread shortages of essential goods, including food and medicine. Despite its estrangement from the Fund, Venezuela retained an IMF quota allocation of 3,722,700 SDR as of 2016.

== See also ==
- Economy of Venezuela
- Hyperinflation in Venezuela
- 2010s oil glut
