= Internet in Venezuela =

Use of the Internet in Venezuela has greatly expanded, but is mostly concentrated among younger, educated city residents, and centered on the capital, Caracas. The Venezuelan economic crisis caused a prolonged period where Venezuela had among some of the lowest speeds in the region, which has been drastically improving starting in 2022. It currently stands at 16% of the median regional speed, but with several private companies overtaking the local market from the state company CANTV with fiber optic connections that average between 100 Mbps and 300 Mbps like Netuno, Fibex, Inter and Thundernet.

== Facts and figures ==
- Top-level domain: .ve
- Internet users:
  - 12.4 million users, 36th in the world; 44.0% of the population, 100th in the world (2012).
  - 8.9 million users, 32nd in the world (2009).
- Internet speed: 1.61 megabits per second (2018), world average is 20 Mbit/s (2014)
- Fixed broadband: 1.9 million subscriptions, 42nd in the world; 6.7% of the population, 95th in the world (2012).
- Wireless broadband: 1.3 million subscriptions, 67th in the world; 4.8% of the population, 112th in the world (2012).
- Internet hosts: 1.0 million hosts, 46th in the world (2012).
- IPv4: 5.0 million addresses allocated, 0.1% of the world total, 179.9 addresses per 1000 people (2012).

== History ==
=== Late 1990s and 2000s ===
Between 1998 and 2002, the number of Internet users in Venezuela grew from 207,000 to 1,585,000, but then decreased to 1,365,000 in 2003 for a current Internet penetration rate of 5.4 percent. As of 2001/2002, the vast majority of personal computers are not connected to the Internet. In 2000, Venezuela had approximately 240 dot-com businesses, mostly business-to-business rather than business-to-consumer. The Venezuelan government claimed to have been attempting to automate its processes and put its agencies and services online, assisted by a newly created agency for information technology, but these attempts were not consistent or thorough. As of 2001, though there were sixty licensed ISPs, CANTV Servicios and Telcel controlled over 90 percent of the Internet market. Hotmail, Google, and Yahoo were by far the most popular sites as of 2003, followed by news sites and other search engines. In 2004, the Venezuelan government estimated that 50.4 percent of the population had never used the Internet and would not be interested in doing so, while 28.9 percent were possible future Internet users, primarily young, educated, middle-class individuals. During a 2004 survey, Internet use was strongly concentrated among young, educated city residents, with, 76 percent of users younger than thirty-five, 67 percent having schooling beyond high school, and more than 60 percent of users coming from Caracas as of the early 2000s.

In a 2007 survey, approximately 26.0 percent of Internet users log on daily. These users tend to be upper-class individuals using home connections for educational or work research and downloading. Over half of the population connects between once and five times per week, using cybercafés for e-mailing and chatting. This group is generally male and represents all socioeconomic levels with the exception of the lowest income segment. A smaller portion of users, 16.9 percent, connect between once every other week and once per month. These light users come again from all economic strata except the lowest class, and they almost exclusively use cybercafés for job search purposes.

=== 2010s ===
As of 2012, statistical reports have shown Internet and broadband penetration in Venezuela as below average for Latin America and much lower than would be expected. State-owned incumbent CANTV has a monopoly in the provision of ADSL, with which it dominates the broadband sector. The only competition comes from cable modems, wireless broadband, and satellite. As a result, ADSL in Venezuela is slower and more expensive than in other Latin American countries. Inter occupies a distant second place after CANTV in the broadband market, with a triple-play package that includes cable TV, cable modem, and telephony. This report provides an overview of Venezuela's Internet, broadband, and pay-TV markets, accompanied by relevant statistics, analyses, and broadband scenario forecasts for the years 2010, 2015 and 2020. See report summary here.

The fastest growing telecom sector in Venezuela was pay TV after mobile broadband, and accounted for 15% of all telecom revenue in the country. The market leaders are DirecTV, Inter, SuperCable, NetUno, Movistar, and CANTV.

Mobile telephony in Venezuela in 2012 has been far more dynamic than the fixed-line market, so much so that mobile phones outnumber fixed lines in service by around 4.6 to one. Mobile penetration is among the highest in Latin America, trailing only Argentina, Uruguay, and a number of Caribbean islands. Venezuela is also a regional leader in terms of SMS traffic, the number of text messages surpassing the number of minutes an average Venezuelan talks on a mobile phone. The country remains one of the last bastions of CDMA in Latin America, but the two leading mobile operators, Movilnet and Movistar, are finally turning to GSM. The third operator, Digitel, offers only GSM services. This report provides an overview of Venezuela's mobile market, accompanied by statistical data and brief profiles of the operators. See report summary here.

In 2014, Venezuela's Internet speed has been called one of the slowest in the world. Its Internet speed was rated at 1.7 Mbit/s, behind both the region average of 5 Mbit/s and the world average of 20 Mbit/s. The Venezuelan government stated that it started a project titled "WiFi for All", but when BBC tried to use the networks in Caracas they did not work at all. The lack of speed in Venezuela has been blamed on poor infrastructure according to several experts. The lack of US dollars due to the Venezuelan governments currency controls has also damaged Internet services because technological equipment must be imported into Venezuela.

In 2018, Venezuela's broadband speed was measured at 1.61 Mbit/s, even slower than in 2014. It was recognized as the slowest internet speed in Latin America.

== Social media ==
Due to economic troubles and shortages in Venezuela, Venezuelans began using social media for everyday necessities, which is possibly one of the reasons Venezuela is one of the most active internet countries in Latin America. Venezuelans have used notice boards and Twitter feeds to find and barter for scarce products such as certain foodstuffs and medicines. Custom made apps have also been created to assist Venezuelans find goods and medicines affected by shortages in the country. Some have also turned toward social media to in order to find reliable news due to government censorship.

== Key developments ==
The National Fibre-Optic Backbone project aims to build a 6,940 km network; Venezuela ranks third in the world for Facebook users as a percentage of Internet users; Venezuela's pay TV market suffers from rampant signal theft; in 2011/2012, two more companies entered the Venezuelan satellite TV market: CANTV and Inter.

Movilnet, Movistar, and Digitel have been allocated additional spectrum; mobile operators are having to invest in their networks, which suffer from severe congestion; Digitel, Movistar, and MovilMax (a WiMAX provider) plan to deploy 4G/LTE networks in 2013/2014; more than one third of Venezuela's mobile subscribers still use CDMA technology; Venezuela continues to have the region's highest ARPU.

== Legal and regulatory frameworks ==
Venezuelan President Hugo Chávez decreed the promotion of Internet use as essential to development. Correspondingly, the government promotes use of information and communication technologies (ICT) through a regulatory framework designed to promote competition among ICT businesses, but no special programs encourage such businesses directly.

In 2005, personal Internet use appeared to be largely unrestricted by law and regulation. The U.S. State Department Report on Human Rights in Venezuela for 2005 states that "there were no government restrictions on the Internet or academic freedom."

In December 2010, a new law "Social Responsibility in Radio, Television and Electronic Media" (Ley de Responsabilidad Social en Radio, Televisión y Medios Electrónicos) was adopted. The law was intended to exercise control over content that could "entice felonies", "create social distress", or "question the legitimate constituted authority". The law has been criticized because it may lead to government censorship and encourages self-censorship.

In 2012 tests conducted by the OpenNet Initiative found no evidence of Internet filtering in the political, social, conflict/security, and Internet tools areas.

In November 2013 Venezuelan ISPs were ordered to block websites that provide the black market exchange rate. The order is based on Venezuela's 2004 media law which makes it illegal to disseminate information that could sow panic among the general public. Reporters Without Borders warned of the alleged "rising censorship in Venezuela's Internet service, including several websites and social networks facing shutdowns". They condemned actions performed by the National Telecommunications Commission (Conatel) after Conatel restricted access to websites with the unofficial market rate and allegedly "demanded social networks, particularly Twitter, to filter images related to protests taking place in Venezuela against the government".

In the Annual Report of the Inter-American Commission on Human Rights 2013, the Organization of American States' Inter-American Commission on Human Rights reported that users of the government-run CANTV were prohibited from seeing certain websites. The IACHR said that the websites of Diario de Cuba and Radionexx were unable to be visited.

The Venezuelan government allegedly blocked images on Twitter in Venezuela for 3 days (12–15 February 2014) which appeared to be an attempt to limit images of protests against shortages and the world's highest inflation rate. Twitter spokesman Nu Wexler stated that, "I can confirm that Twitter images are now blocked in Venezuela" adding that "[w]e believe it the government that is blocking". During the same period of time, it was reported that Internet access was unavailable in San Cristóbal, Táchira for up to about half a million citizens from an alleged blockage of service by the government with multiple sources claiming that the Venezuelan government blocked Internet access. Internet access was reported to be available again one day and a half later.

== See also ==
- Telecommunications in Venezuela
