= Prostitution in Venezuela =

Sex work in Venezuela is legal and regulated. The country's Ministry of Health and Social Development requires sex workers to carry identification cards and to have monthly health checkups. Prostitution is common, particularly in Caracas and in other domestic tourist destinations. The Venezuelan sex work industry arose in conjunction with the oil industry of the twentieth century and continues today.

== History ==
Sex work in Venezuela is closely tied to its economic history and the history of oil production. Venezuela received an influx of population after the first significant oil wells were drilled in the beginning of the 20th century. The presence of relatively well-paid foreign oil workers greatly expanded the sex trade in port cities. In particular, black women of a lower socioeconomic class who could not get jobs as domestics or selling sweets and candies as street vendors in urban areas turned to prostitution for money.

Women and girls from surrounding Andean states, in particular Colombia, were also recruited to come to Venezuela and sometimes forced to work in the sex trade. Prostitution became a big business and women from the Caribbean and even Europe (notably Netherlands, France, and Belgium) came to Venezuela looking for work. Black women made up the majority of sex workers until the 1920s when French women took over the prostitution district of Silencio in Caracas and the port cities of La Guiara and Puerto Cabello. Guajiro Indian women outnumbered black or European sex workers in Maracaibo.

Establishments frequented by oilmen like the famous Pavilion opened up as combination bar, brothels, and dance hall. Sex workers from rural areas would also be transported to oil towns on Saturdays, “where workers lined the docks to greet them by name.” Some companies even began dispensing condoms, and city leaders began to regulate and limit the trade. They classified the activity, applied a city tax to the work, and required weekly medical examinations of the sex workers.

The city also began to require that workers carry health cards with them. In 1930, an anti-venereal institute conducted a census of major towns in the state, and prostitutes were required to report where they worked to local offices. Some upper-class sex workers had access to private doctors for regular exams. A market for local remedies to venereal diseased developed, but the rate of STIs continued to increase. In 1935, the government made the first Sunday in September Anti-Venereal Disease Day. By 1947, the government estimated that 64 percent of hospital patients had syphilis, and 37 percent of patients had other venereal diseases such as chancroid (chancre blando). A Ministry of Health report showed that the office needed over 3 million units of penicillin at any given time for the treatment of syphilis. Oil companies started testing and firing employees with syphilis until unions got involved and called for treatment without termination. Eventually, the public's sense of morality was offended by the effects of the growing sex trade, and night clubs with prostitutes and brothels were moved from downtown to red light districts on the outskirts of cities. Many ended up between large Shell and Lago urban camps, which continued to supply them with “innumerable patrons.”

=== Women's rights movements and prostitution ===
In 1935, the Women's Cultural Association (Asociación Cultural Femenina or ACF) was the first influential women's rights group to in Venezuela to talk about prostitution. They gave public talks about sex work and protection from STIs. However, other women's groups, such as women's socialist movements, called for an end to prostitution in the 1940s. Though advocacy for sex workers did continue throughout the century, and a local sex worker organization called AMBAR received international attention and support after opposing illegal offices searches of sex work agencies by the police.

=== Prostitution in the late 20th century ===
Rates of trafficking and prostitution increased again after Venezuela's economic decline due to a decrease in oil revenues and an increase in foreign debt payments in 1980s. The catastrophic flood of December 1999 also led to high levels of unemployment, particularly for women, in Venezuela. Some women turned to sex work and were trafficked internally or internationally.

== Current laws ==
Prostitution is currently legal in Venezuela. In March 2007, the Organic Law on the Right of Women to a Life Free of Violence criminalized trafficking and forced prostitution, among other forms of gender-based violence. Trafficking can now result in up to 20 years of penalties for coercing a victim to perform a sexual act against their will for a third party. Inducing child prostitution and the “corruption of minors” is penalized with three to 18 months in prison or up to four years in prison if the minor is under 12. Sentences increase to up to six years if the crime is recurrently committed.

Venezuela's Ministry of Health and Social Development (Ministerio de Salud y Desarrollo Social) requires that women working as sex workers in nightclubs have a free monthly health check. The check includes a gynecological exam and a syphilis screening. HIV tests are required every six months. Sex workers are not screened for infections caused by the hepatitis B or C viruses.

=== Identification cards ===
Article 6 of the 1949 Convención para la Represión de la Trata de Personas y de la Explotación de la Prostitución Ajena (Convention for the Suppression of the Traffic in Persons and of the Exploitation of the Prostitution of Others) calls for signatories to repeal or abolish any law, regulation, or administrative provision that requires registration or possession of special identification cards by sex workers. Venezuela, a signatory of the convention, is in violation of Article 6 because sex workers must carry identity cards issued by the Health Ministry that guarantees that card holders are free of STIs and HIV/AIDS. This is a common practice in Latin American and Caribbean countries. When police and Healthy Ministry workers raid nightclubs, women without these cards are arrested or expected to provide money and/or sexual favors. However, a state-issued national identity card is required to obtain the Health Ministry card, making it impossible for undocumented immigrants to legally obtain the card. Many go to private agents or "gestores" to obtain documents.

== Demographics ==
There have been no large-scale studies in order to collect demographic information about sex workers in Venezuela. A study of 212 sex workers conducted in 2003 evaluated at a health center in a city near Caracas found that 91% of workers were Venezuelan. The rest of the workers came from Colombia, the Dominican Republic, and Ecuador. The workers had an average age of 29.6 and an average of 2.12 children. 55.7% had one or two children. 53% of the women dropped out of secondary school.

Over 80% of the workers had had sexual intercourse before the age of 19. 44.1% of the women previously had an abortion. 41.7% used condoms all the time, 20.7% on occasion, and 36.5% reported that they never used condoms.

== Trans sex workers ==
Special scholarly attention has been paid to the lives of trans sex workers in Venezuela, called travesti. Travesti are people who are assigned male at birth but who present in their daily lives as women. Some consider the term an insult, but it is also used by travesti as a self-identification.

Studies have reported a problematic relationship between the Policía Metropolitana de Caracas (PM) and transformista sex workers. Transformistas face the problem of officer impunity and a culture of silence. When asked what she would do if a police officer assaulted her, a transformista responded "The PM?! Ay no. Because then when they see you on the street, just imagine.” The travesti face a penal system in which a complaint does not change police behavior but rather serves as a marker for possible future aggressions. However, the number of LGBT organizations in Venezuela has grown in the past decade, including organizations that advocate specifically for trans people and travesti sex workers.

Marianela Tovar, an LGBT activist in Caracas at the organization Contranatura, explains that travesti experience violence from police and clients of sex work but still feel forced to do sex work because “it’s the only way that they can be their true gender identity.” In other professions common for women in Venezuela, such as nursing, trans women would not be able to present as their chosen gender identity.

=== Transformista migration ===
Another trend regarding Venezuelan travesti that has been investigated is the migration trans women from Venezuela to Europe to become transgender sex workers. The first generation to do this came to Italy in the 1970s. Now, travesti also travel to Spain, France, Germany, and Switzerland. In Europe, travesti are able to “enhance the process of transforming their male bodies towards perfect femininity.” The trans sex trade in Europe is lucrative, and their earnings allow them to transform their bodies through plastic surgery, expensive hair extensions, makeup, designer clothes, and accessories.

== Sex trafficking ==
Venezuela is a source and destination country for women and children subjected to sex trafficking. As the economic situation deteriorated, the mass migration of Venezuelans to neighboring countries increased. During the reporting period, alleged victims of trafficking from Venezuela were identified in Aruba, Colombia, Costa Rica, Curaçao, Dominican Republic, Ecuador, Greece, Portugal, Guyana, Mexico, Panama, Peru, Spain, Suriname, and Trinidad and Tobago. Venezuelan women and girls, including some lured from poor interior regions to urban and tourist centers, are subjected to sex trafficking and child sex tourism within the country. Venezuelan officials and international organizations have reported identifying sex trafficking victims from South American, Caribbean, Asian, and African countries in Venezuela. Venezuelan officials reported an increase of sex trafficking in the informal mining sector.

The United States Department of State Office to Monitor and Combat Trafficking in Persons ranks Venezuela as a 'Tier 3' country.
