= List of Venezuelans by net worth =

This is a list of Venezuelan billionaires based on an annual assessment of wealth and assets compiled and published by Forbes magazine in 2024.

== 2024 Venezuelan billionaires list ==
World Rank	Name	Citizenship	Net worth (USD)	Source of wealth
502	Juan Carlos Escotet	Venezuela; Spain	7.4 billion	banking

== See also ==
- The World's Billionaires
- List of countries by the number of billionaires
