= Steve Hanke =

American economist (born 1942)

Steve H. Hanke
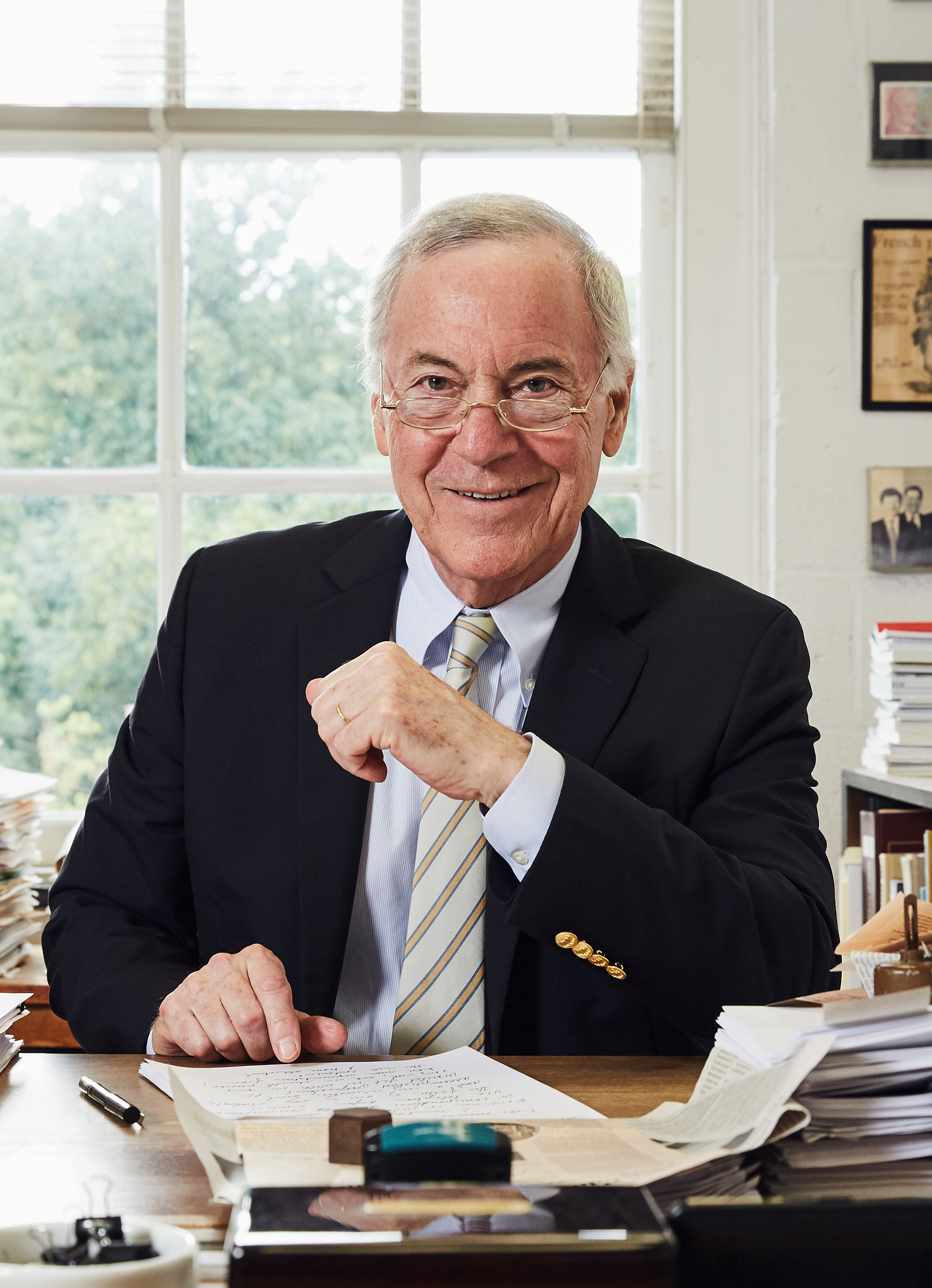
- Hanke in 2017
- Born: December 29, 1942 (age 83); Macon, Georgia, U.S.

Academic background
- Education: University of Colorado Boulder
- Influences: Friedrich Hayek; Milton Friedman; Robert Mundell; Kenneth Boulding; Peter Thomas Bauer; Ronald Coase

Academic work
- Discipline: Monetary economics Natural resource economics Financial economics International economics
- School or tradition: Free-market economics
- Institutions: Colorado School of Mines; University of California, Berkeley; Johns Hopkins University
- Notable ideas: Currency board research Dollarization research Hyperinflation research Hanke–Henry Permanent Calendar; Privatization research Water resources research

Steve H. Hanke (/ˈhæŋki/; born December 29, 1942) is an American economist and professor of applied economics at the Johns Hopkins University in Baltimore, Maryland. (Note: He worked within the Department of Environmental Health and Engineering at the Whiting School of Engineering.) He is also a senior fellow at the Independent Institute in Oakland, California, and co-director of the Johns Hopkins University's Institute for Applied Economics, Global Health, and the Study of Business Enterprise in Baltimore, Maryland.

Hanke is known for his work as a currency reformer in emerging-market countries. (Note: Such countries include Albania, Argentina, Bulgaria, Bosnia and Herzegovina, Ecuador, Estonia, Indonesia, Jamaica, Kazakhstan, Lithuania, Montenegro, Russia, Venezuela, and Yugoslavia.) He was a senior economist with President Ronald Reagan's Council of Economic Advisers from 1981 to 1982, and has served as an adviser to heads of state in countries throughout Asia, South America, Europe, and the Middle East. He is also known for his work on currency boards, dollarization, hyperinflation, water pricing and demand, benefit-cost analysis, privatization, and other topics in applied economics. He has written extensively as a columnist for Forbes, The National Review, and other publications. He is also a currency and commodity trader.

Hanke has been accused of spreading misinformation about the COVID-19 pandemic as a result of his critique of the effectiveness of lockdowns, as well as the 2022 Russian invasion of Ukraine, and was listed as a Russian propagandist by Ukraine's Center for Countering Disinformation.

== Early life and education ==
Hanke was born in Macon, Georgia, in 1942 and grew up in Atlantic, Iowa, where he attended Atlantic High School. He then attended the University of Colorado Boulder in Boulder, where he was a member of the Phi Delta Theta fraternity. Hanke earned a B.S. in business administration (1964) and a Ph.D. in economics (1969) from the University of Colorado.

== Academic career ==
Hanke's first academic appointment was at the Colorado School of Mines in 1966, when he was 24. During this time, Hanke developed and taught courses in mineral and petroleum economics, while completing his Ph.D. dissertation on the impact of meter installation on municipal water demand. Hanke then joined the faculty of the Johns Hopkins University, where he initially specialized in water resource economics. After six years at Johns Hopkins, including a one-year visiting professorship at the University of California, Berkeley, Hanke attained the rank of full professor within the Department of Environmental Health and Engineering at the Whiting School of Engineering, one of the fastest promotions to that rank in the school's history. At present, Hanke teaches courses in applied economics and finance that are widely recognized as a gateway for Hopkins students to gain employment on Wall Street.

Over the course of his career, Hanke has held editorial positions with a number of academic journals, including the Journal of Economic Policy Reform; Water Resources Research; Land Economics; and Water Engineering and Management. He currently holds editorial positions with The International Economy, The Independent Review, Cato Journal, Review of Austrian Economics, Economic Journal Watch, and Central Banking. In 1995, Hanke and Johns Hopkins University history professor Louis Galambos founded the Johns Hopkins Institute for Applied Economics, Global Health and Study of Business Enterprise. Hanke is also a senior fellow and director of the Troubled Currencies Project at the Cato Institute, a special counselor to the Center for Financial Stability, and a member of the Charter Council of the Society for Economic Measurement. Hanke is a senior advisor at Renmin University's International Monetary Research Institute, in association with Nobel laureate Robert Mundell (1932–2021) of Columbia.

=== Water resource economics ===
In 1969, Hanke began his academic career as a water resource economist in the Johns Hopkins Department of Geography and Environmental Engineering (now the Department of Environmental Health and Engineering), a department founded by famed sanitary engineer Abel Wolman. At the time, the department was known as the premier water resource engineering department in the country, and was home to world-renowned sanitary engineer John C. Geyer, with whom Hanke would frequently collaborate. Hanke was hired to continue the water-related research program at Johns Hopkins that began during the Geyer era. During his initial years in the department, Hanke focused on issues including water pricing and demand, benefit-cost analysis, system design, and leak detection and control. He produced a number of important pieces of scholarship, including the first event study of the impact of water meter installation on water use, as well as sewer interceptor design criteria which are still commonly used today in Europe.

During this time, Hanke served as the associate editor of the Water Resources Bulletin and Water Resources Research, as the economics editor for Water Engineering and Management, and as a member of the editorial board of Land Economics. He was also an adviser to the French water companies Compagnie Générale des Eaux (now Veolia Environment) and Compagnie Lyonnaise des Eaux, as well as to the engineering firms Snowy Mountains Engineering Corporation in Australia, and Binnie & Partners in London. In 1981, Hanke was appointed a senior economist with the president's Council of Economic Advisers, where his responsibilities included the Reagan White House's water portfolio. While at the CEA, Hanke led a team that re-wrote the federal government's Principles and Guidelines for Water and Land Related Resources Implementation Studies, to include more rigorous benefit-cost analysis requirements. Hanke continues to be active in the water resources field, focusing primarily on municipal water system privatization. He is a member of the Johns Hopkins University Global Water Program.

=== Privatization ===
Hanke has produced eight books and numerous articles and proposals dealing with the privatization of public-sector resources. In 1972, he was a research associate at the National Museums of Kenya, where he worked with anthropologist and conservationist Richard Leakey on the economics of big game cropping and hunting, as well as the privatization of big game reserves to combat poaching. Hanke also worked with Barney Dowdle of the University of Washington and the Confederated Tribes of Siletz Indians of Lincoln County, Oregon, on a proposal to privatize portions of their reservation, as a means of improving economic opportunity on Native American reservations. While at the White House, Hanke worked closely with his long-time associate, CEA member William A. Niskanen. He was known as a member of the supply-side economics movement within the Reagan administration. It was during this time that Hanke was noted for developing United States Ronald Reagan's program for privatizing public assets and services, particularly municipal water systems, and public grazing and timber lands. This plan was endorsed by one of Reagan's closest allies, the then Nevada senator Paul Laxalt, among others.

Hanke's work to privatize public lands put him at odds with Secretary of the Interior James Watt and members of the Sagebrush Rebellion, who sought to transfer federal public lands to state control, rather than to private ownership. In 1982, Hanke left the CEA, joining a number of influential Reagan administration supply-siders, including Martin Anderson, Norman B. Ture, and Paul Craig Roberts. In 1984, Hanke was appointed a senior adviser to the Joint Economic Committee of the U.S. Congress, where he advised Senators Steve Symms and Paul Laxalt on privatization. Although the English term "reprivatisation" first appeared in The Economist magazine in the 1930s, and subsequently in various academic journals, Hanke and his wife, Liliane, are often credited with popularizing the term "privatization" – derived from the French term privatise – in the American economic lexicon during the 1980s, as well as for bringing about its inclusion in Merriam-Webster's Collegiate Dictionary. Hanke has authored numerous articles on the subject of privatization, including the entry for "Privatization" in the 1987 edition of The New Palgrave: A Dictionary of Economics.

=== Currency boards and dollarization ===
After Hong Kong reinstated its currency board in 1983, Hanke began to collaborate with his fellow Johns Hopkins professor, and Margaret Thatcher's personal economic adviser, Sir Alan Walters, on the subject of currency boards. A currency board is a monetary authority that issues a local currency that is fully backed by a foreign reserve currency, and which is freely convertible with the foreign reserve currency at a fixed exchange rate. Walters was a key advocate of the reestablishment of Hong Kong's currency board. Hanke and Walters established a currency board research program at Johns Hopkins. One of Hanke's first post-doctoral fellows in that program was Kurt Schuler. Shortly after Schuler's arrival at Johns Hopkins, Hanke and Schuler discovered that John Maynard Keynes was an advocate of currency boards. Hanke and Schuler presented these findings, including original documentation, in a book edited by Walters and Hanke.

During this time, Hanke began conducting research on dollarization, whereby a country replaces its domestic currency with a stable foreign currency – creating a de facto fixed-exchange-rate monetary system between two countries. Over the course of his career, Hanke has written over 20 books and monographs and over 300 articles on currency boards and dollarization. Many of these were written in collaboration with Kurt Schuler. Hanke also co-authored with Sir Alan Walters the entry for "Currency Boards" in the 1992 edition of The New Palgrave Dictionary of Money and Finance. In addition, he played a central role in drafting and bringing about the inclusion of the Hanke Amendment in the 1993 Foreign Operations Appropriations Bill. This measure, sponsored by Senators Phil Graham, Bob Dole, Connie Mack, Jesse Helms, and Steve Symms allowed U.S. contributions to the International Monetary Fund to be used for the purpose of establishing currency boards.

=== Hyperinflation ===
Hanke has written extensively on the subject of hyperinflation, which describes when a country's inflation rate exceeds 50% per month. In 2008, Hanke and Alex Kwok published a paper, which estimated that Zimbabwe's hyperinflation peaked in November 2008 at 7.96×10^{10}%. This makes Zimbabwe's hyperinflation the second-highest in history – peaking 3.5 months after the Mugabe government stopped reporting inflation statistics, and 1.5 months after the IMF's last estimate of Zimbabwe's inflation rate, with a peak inflation rate 30 million times higher than the last official rate.

Hanke employs a methodology, based on the principle of purchasing power parity, which allows him to accurately estimate inflation in countries with very high inflation rates. Using this methodology, Hanke and his collaborators discovered several cases of hyperinflation that had previously gone unreported in the academic literature and popular press. These include the 1923 hyperinflation episode in the Free City of Danzig, and 21st-century suspected cases in North Korea (2011) and Iran (2012). In 2012, Hanke and Nicholas Krus documented 56 cases of hyperinflation that have occurred in history, in "World Hyperinflations", a chapter in the Routledge Handbook of Major Events in Economic History. Since then, Hanke has documented two additional cases of hyperinflation: one occurred in Venezuela in 2016, and the other occurred in Zimbabwe in 2017. In 2013, Hanke founded the Troubled Currencies Project, a collaboration between the Johns Hopkins University and the Cato Institute, in order to track exchange-rate and inflation data in countries including Argentina, Egypt, Nigeria, North Korea, Syria, and Venezuela.

=== Monetary analysis ===
Hanke's views on monetary policy are influenced by his experience as a currency and commodities trader, as well as by the economics of Milton Friedman, Robert Mundell, and Friedrich Hayek. Hanke is a proponent of Divisia monetary aggregates, originated by William A. Barnett of the University of Kansas and the Center for Financial Stability. Barnett's derivation uses the Divisia quantity index formula of Francois Divisia with the monetary-assets user-cost-price formula derived by Barnett (1980). Hanke also favors broad monetary aggregates as articulated by economists, including Tim Congdon. Hanke argues that changes in nominal national income are a function of changes in broad money aggregates.

In 2012, Hanke developed a method of monetary analysis known as state-money/bank-money analysis (SMBMA). This methodology is based on John Maynard Keynes' distinction between money produced by a central bank ("state money") and money produced via the private banking sector, through deposit creation ("bank money"), contained in the 1930 classic A Treatise on Money. Hanke has employed SMBMA as a method of analyzing the response of various countries to the 2008 financial crisis. In particular, Hanke has employed SMBMA for the United States, the United Kingdom, and various countries in the European Union to study the pro-cyclical effects of higher capital-asset ratios implemented during economic downturns. Hanke has been an outspoken critic of pro-cyclical capital requirements imposed under Basel III, Dodd–Frank, and other financial regulatory regimes. He is also on the advisory board of the Official Monetary and Financial Institutions Forum (OMFIF) in London, where he regularly contributes to the OMFIF's The Bulletin and is involved in meetings regarding financial and monetary systems.

=== Hanke–Henry Permanent Calendar ===
Hanke and his colleague Richard Conn Henry, a professor in the Johns Hopkins Department of Physics and Astronomy, developed the Hanke–Henry Permanent Calendar, which aims to reform the current Gregorian calendar by making every year identical; it also integrates the abolition of time zones. With the Hanke–Henry Permanent Calendar, every calendar date would always fall on the same day of the week. Some of the advantages would include a permanent day of the week for all holidays; a simplification of financial calculations, and it would not draw criticism from religious groups because it retains the Sabbath.

== Economic advising and currency reform ==
Hanke began advising political leaders on economic issues in the late 1970s, when he served as a member of the Governor's Council of Economic Advisers for the State of Maryland, along with Carl Christ and Clopper Almon. After stints at the president's Council of Economic Advisers, the Congressional Joint Economic Committee, and the president's Task Force on Project Economic Justice during the Reagan administration, Hanke began advising heads of state in developing countries on a pro-bono basis. Hanke has advised five presidents (Bulgaria, Indonesia, Kazakhstan, Venezuela, and Montenegro); five cabinet ministers (Albania, Argentina, Ecuador, Yugoslavia, and the United Arab Emirates); and has held two cabinet-level positions (Lithuania and Montenegro).

As the fall of Soviet regimes and the Soviet ruble began to spark currency crises throughout the former Soviet Union, Hanke began to work as an economic adviser to a number of heads of state in newly independent countries in Eastern Europe and the Balkans. In 1998, under Hanke's leadership, Friedberg Mercantile Group, Inc. was one of the few trading shops to predict the devaluation of the Russian ruble. Hanke predicted that the devaluation would occur after mid-year, and the ruble collapsed shortly thereafter, on August 17, 1998. In collaboration with his then-post-doctoral student, Kurt Schuler, Hanke developed a blueprint for a currency board reform package, which he proposed in a number of countries throughout the 1990s, including Albania, Argentina, Bulgaria, Bosnia and Herzegovina, Ecuador, Estonia, Indonesia, Jamaica, Kazakhstan, Lithuania, Montenegro, Russia, Venezuela, and Yugoslavia.

=== Argentina ===
In 1989, Hanke met Argentine President Carlos Menem, who connected Hanke and his wife, Liliane, with the right-wing libertarian faction in the Argentine Congress led by Alvaro Alsogaray, for the purpose of developing a currency reform that would end Argentina's inflation problems. Hanke was an early proponent of a currency board system for Argentina, which he outlined in a 1991 book. The book, ¿Banco Central O Caja de Conversión? was co-authored by Kurt Schuler and included a preface by Argentine Congressman José María Ibarbia, who was a member of the Alsogaray faction. Later, Hanke worked closely with Menem and members of the Argentine Congress to implement a currency board, along the general lines of Hanke and Schuler's original proposal. The result was not an orthodox currency board, but rather a "convertibility system", passed in the Convertibility Law of 1991, which ended Argentina's hyperinflation episode.

During the 1989 to 1991 period, Hanke worked closely with Congressman José María Ibarbia and his colleagues (the Alsogaray faction) in the Argentine Congress to develop a blueprint for a currency board system. That blueprint was published in Buenos Aires and contains a preface written by José María Ibarbia. Following Hanke and Sir Alan Walters' 1994 prediction of the Mexican peso's collapse, Argentine Finance Minister Domingo Cavallo invited Hanke to serve as his adviser. During this time, Hanke's primary role was to leverage his scholarship and experience as one of the experts who was in the middle of the currency reform debates before the adoption of the convertibility system – as well as his credibility established when he predicted the tequila crisis – to explain how the convertibility system operated at the time, and to restore confidence in Argentina and the peso's international credibility. At the time, Hanke was described by Argentine newspapers as "Cavallo's spokesman", as well as the "generator of confidence" in the Argentine economy.

Argentina's convertibility system differed in several key respects from Hanke's original proposal. In October 1991, the year the system was implemented, Hanke warned in a Wall Street Journal op-ed that the convertibility system could begin to function as a central bank, and eventually collapse. This prediction came true in the late 1990s, as the Argentine convertibility system began to function like a central bank and engage in sterilization. Hanke wrote many articles showing that the convertibility system was not a currency board. As the convertibility system began to falter, Carlos Menem, on Hanke's advice, proposed dollarization for Argentina – first in 1995 and again in January 1999. In February 1999, Menem asked Hanke to prepare a dollarization blueprint for Argentina. This proposal was never acted upon, and the convertibility system ultimately collapsed in 2002.

=== Yugoslavia and Albania ===
In January 1990, Hanke was appointed the personal economic adviser to Yugoslav Deputy Prime Minister Zivko Pregl. Although Pregl was at one point a leader of the Communist League of Yugoslavia, he sought Hanke's counsel on ways to liberalize Yugoslavia's socialist economy. During this time, Hanke proposed a number of free-market reforms, including the privatization of Yugoslavia's pension system, as well as a currency board system to address the failing Yugoslav dinar.

In 1991, the Ekonomski Institute Beograd published a book, in the Serbo-Croatian language, which Hanke and Schuler co-authored. The book laid out the details about what would have been a Yugoslav currency board. However, these efforts were suspended when the Yugoslav civil war broke out and Pregl resigned in June 1991. After the war broke out, Hanke continued his involvement in the Balkans, working with Deloitte & Touche's Eastern European division to establish new Deloitte offices and bring traditional financial accounting to the formerly communist country. That same year, Hanke also began advising Albanian Deputy Prime Minister and Minister of Economy Gramoz Pashko on the possibility of establishing a currency board in Albania. The proposal was contained in Hanke and Kurt Schuler's 1991 monograph "A Currency Board Solution for the Albanian Lek", published by the International Freedom Foundation. The proposal was never acted upon.

=== Bulgaria ===
In 1990, Hanke anticipated Bulgaria's 1991 hyperinflation episode and began designing a currency board system for Bulgaria. He incorporated this proposal into a monograph co-authored with Kurt Schuler. The monograph, "Teeth for the Bulgarian Lev: A Currency Board Solution" was published in 1991. Hanke continued his work on a Bulgarian currency board, periodically visiting Sofia throughout the early 1990s. In late 1996, Hanke and Schuler's currency reform handbook Currency Boards for Developing Countries gained popularity when a pirated Bulgarian-language version of the book became a best-seller in Sofia. In 1997, during Bulgaria's second episode of hyperinflation, Hanke was appointed as an adviser to Bulgarian President Petar Stoyanov, and worked to bring about the establishment of Bulgaria's currency board. Inspired by the original Hanke-Schuler blueprint, members of the Bulgarian government drafted a law which converted the Bulgarian National Bank to a currency board system. Acting in his capacity as Stoyanov's adviser, Hanke continued to be deeply involved in fine-tuning and steering his idea to full adoption, throughout the drafting, legislative, and implementation process.

Bulgaria adopted the proposal and installed the currency board on July 1, 1997. The currency board linked the lev to the German Deutsche Mark, and later the euro. Upon adoption, the Bulgarian Currency Board immediately put an end to the country's 1997 hyperinflation episode. Hanke continued to serve as President Stoyanov's adviser until the end of his term in 2002. Hanke remains active in Bulgaria, as a vocal supporter of the currency board, the country's flat tax, and anti-corruption measures. He frequently contributes to the Bulgarian publications Capital, Trud and Novinite, among others. In 2013, Hanke's work on the Bulgarian currency board was praised by Bulgarian Prime Minister Plamen Oresharski, and the Bulgarian Academy of Sciences awarded Hanke a doctorate honoris causa. And in 2015, Varna Free University awarded Hanke the title doctor honoris causa, in honor of his scholarship on currency boards and his reform efforts in Bulgaria. In 2018, the D. A. Tsenov Academy of Economics awarded Hanke a doctorate honoris causa in honor of Hanke's work as the father of the Bulgarian currency board.

=== Estonia ===
In 1992, Hanke, Kurt Schuler, and Lars Jonung – then a professor at the Stockholm School of Economics – released a book in both English and Estonian containing a blueprint for an Estonian currency board. After Jonung was appointed chief economic advisor to Swedish Prime Minister Carl Bildt, in 1992, Jonung convinced Bildt to embrace the idea of a currency board for Estonia and arrange for its presentation to the Estonian government. In May 1992, Hanke presented the currency board blueprint to members of Estonia's Constituent Assembly in Tallinn. One month later, in June 1992, Estonia adopted a monetary system based on the Hanke-Jonung-Schuler proposal. Estonia thus abandoned the Soviet ruble and began issuing its own currency, linking the Estonian kroon to the German Mark at a fixed exchange rate. Following the introduction of the euro, the kroon was linked to the euro, until January 1, 2011, when Estonia officially adopted the euro as its currency.

=== Lithuania ===
In the early 1990s, George Selgin, Joseph Sinkey Jr., and Kurt Schuler began working with Elena Leontjeva of the Lithuanian Free Market Institute (LFMI) on a reform proposal for Lithuania's central bank. Later, Hanke also began collaborating with the LFMI during regular visits to Vilnius. Having witnessed the positive effects of neighboring Estonia's currency board, Lithuanian Prime Minister Adolfas Šleževičius, met with Hanke and his wife Liliane over lunch in January 1994 to discuss the possibility of a currency reform package for Lithuania. During that meeting, Šleževičius appointed Hanke a state counselor – a cabinet-level appointment – and tasked him with designing a currency board system for Lithuania.

The LFMI immediately arranged for Hanke and Schuler to publish a book in Lithuanian, Valiutu Taryba: Pasiulymai Lietuvai. Their book contained a currency board blueprint for the country. This measure was adopted in April 1994, linking the Lithuanian litas to the German Mark at a fixed exchange rate. Following the introduction of the euro, the litas was linked to the euro, until January 1, 2015, when Lithuania officially adopted the euro as its currency.

=== Bosnia and Herzegovina ===
Influenced by the 1991 Hanke-Schuler book proposing a currency board for Yugoslavia, the 1995 Dayton Agreement required Bosnia and Herzegovina to employ a currency board for at least six years. In the aftermath of the Yugoslav civil war, local officials and an IMF team set about to create a central bank for Bosnia and Herzegovina based on the principles of a currency board. Hanke began serving as a special adviser to the U.S. government in December 1996 and was tasked with ensuring that the central bank law resulted in a currency board system that was as orthodox as possible.

Shortly after his appointment, Hanke published a critique of the IMF currency board proposal. Warren Coats, a key member of the IMF team discussed Hanke's involvement at length in a 2007 book. In a section of the book titled "Steve Hanke", Coats recounts:

Following [Hanke]'s visit, he published an article in the Winter 1996/97 issue of Central Banking in which he praised the adopting of a currency board by Bosnia but criticized some of the features we were trying to give it in our draft law ... In the end, the seeds he planted took root and won out, though I am not sure whether it was because the Serbs required the changes he proposed or whether the U.S. Treasury did.

— Warren L. Coats, One Currency for Bosnia: Creating the Central Bank of Bosnia and Herzegovina

=== Indonesia ===
In August 1997, upon urging from the International Monetary Fund, Indonesia adopted a floating exchange rate for its currency, the rupiah. In the ensuing months, the rupiah weakened significantly against the U.S. dollar. Inflation in Indonesia began to accelerate, sparking food riots across the country. In February 1998, Indonesian President Suharto invited Hanke to serve as his economic adviser. On the day of Hanke's appointment as special counselor and a member of Indonesia's Economic and Monetary Resilience Council, the rupiah appreciated by 28% against the U.S. dollar. During his time as Suharto's adviser, Hanke had an unprecedented level of access to the Indonesian president and even played a role in the dismissal of Indonesia's Central Bank governor.

Hanke recommended that Indonesia institute an orthodox currency board, linking the rupiah to the U.S. dollar at a fixed exchange rate. Hanke supported the reforms contained in the IMF's package. But, he argued that the IMF's program would fail unless it was coupled with a currency board arrangement. Hanke referred to his alternative reform package for Indonesia as "IMF Plus". It garnered the support of notable economists, including Gary Becker, Rudiger Dornbusch, Milton Friedman, Merton Miller, Robert Mundell, and Sir Alan Walters. Hanke was also named one of the 25 most influential people in the world by World Trade Magazine during this time.

In 1998, during his annual accountability speech, Suharto announced his intention to adopt Hanke's currency board proposal. This plan was met with opposition by the governments of Germany, Japan, and Singapore, among others. Some economists including Nouriel Roubini and Paul Krugman criticized Hanke's proposal. The fiercest resistance, however, came from the IMF and from U.S. President Bill Clinton – who threatened to withdraw $43 billion in aid if Indonesia adopted Hanke's proposal.

Later, officials including former U.S. Secretary of State Lawrence Eagleburger, as well as former Australian Prime Minister Paul Keating, conceded that criticism of Hanke's proposal did not stem from opposition to the economics of Hanke's proposal, but rather out of concern that a stable rupiah would thwart U.S.-led efforts to oust Suharto. As Nobel laureate Merton Miller recalled in 1999, the objection to Hanke's proposal was "not that it wouldn't work but that it would, and if it worked, they would be stuck with Suharto." Under intense international pressure, Suharto ultimately reversed course and abandoned Hanke's "IMF Plus" proposal. On May 21, 1998, amid continued currency problems, as well as protests and reports of a brewing military coup, Suharto resigned as president of Indonesia.

=== Montenegro ===
In 1999, Hanke and Montenegrin economist Željko Bogetić, who was an economist at the IMF at the time, wrote Crnogorska marka, a book published in Montenegro, proposing an orthodox currency board for Montenegro, which was part of the Federal Republic of Yugoslavia. Montenegro would issue a Montenegrin "marka" to replace the Yugoslav dinar. Later that year in July 1999, Hanke was appointed state counselor – a cabinet-level position – and began advising Montenegrin President Milo Đukanović on issues including currency reform. After assessing the political and economic realities on the ground, Hanke advised Đukanović that Montenegro should abandon the faltering Yugoslav dinar and adopt a foreign currency, the German Mark, as its own. This process is known as dollarization.

In 1999, Montenegro was part of the Federal Republic of Yugoslavia, along with Serbia. Đukanović began pursuing Hanke's dollarization proposal for both economic and political reasons. In addition to providing relief from high inflation, dollarization also promised Montenegro the ability to pursue economic – and ultimately political – independence from Serbia. In late 1999, Montenegro introduced the German Mark as an official currency. In late 2000, the Yugoslav dinar was officially dropped, making the Deutsche Mark the sole legal tender in Montenegro.

=== Ecuador ===
Hanke was an early proponent of currency boards and later dollarization in Ecuador. In 1995, Hanke and Kurt Schuler published a currency board blueprint in Spanish that was widely circulated in Ecuador. In May 1996, Hanke traveled to Ecuador to encourage then-presidential candidate Abdalá Bucaram to pursue a currency board for Ecuador. Shortly thereafter, Bucaram raised the idea of a currency board while on the campaign trail. Following Bucaram's election, Hanke presented a dollarization proposal to members of the Ecuadorian government.

By February 1997, Bucaram had been removed from office on insanity charges, and the dollarization idea lay dormant. In 1999, Ecuador's currency, the sucre, collapsed, losing 75% of its value against the U.S. dollar from the start of 1999 until the first week of January 2000. Shortly thereafter, Ecuadorian President Jamil Mahuad resurrected the dollarization idea. On January 9, 2000, he announced that Ecuador would abandon the sucre and officially adopt the U.S. dollar, putting an end to Ecuador's high inflation. In 2001, Hanke was appointed adviser to Ecuador's Minister of Finance and Economy, to assist with the implementation of dollarization. In 2003, Hanke was awarded the honorary degree Doctor of Arts by the Universidad San Francisco de Quito, and in 2004, he was named professor asociado by the Universidad del Azuay in Cuenca, Ecuador, in honor of his reform efforts in Ecuador and scholarship on dollarization.

== Currency and commodity trading ==
Hanke has been trading commodities and currencies for over 60 years. He has also trained a number of Johns Hopkins students who have gone on to successful careers in finance. He is chairman emeritus of the Friedberg Mercantile Group, Inc. in Toronto. During the 1990s, he served as president of Toronto Trust Argentina (TTA) in Buenos Aires. It was the world best performing mutual fund in 1995. Hanke also serves on the supervisory board of AMG (Advanced Metallurgical Group, N.V.), which was the best performing stock on the Amsterdam Stock Exchange in 2017, with its market capitalization increasing by 201%. In May 2019, Hanke was appointed chairman of AMG's supervisory board. In the past, he has served on the board of the Philadelphia Stock Exchange and the National Bank of Kuwait's International Advisory Board, which was chaired by Sir John Major.

In 1995, during the Mexican tequila crisis, many investors were shying away from Argentine investments. Relying on his deep understanding of the convertibility system, Hanke bet against the market and had TTA fully invested in Argentine peso-denominated bonds. As a result, TTA was the world's best performing mutual fund in 1995, with a 79.25% increase. Hanke has taken several other notable successful trading positions during his career. For example, in late 1985, he was among the first to correctly predict that oil would fall below $10 per barrel, and in 1993, he joined a successful speculative attack on the French franc, which elicited an article in Paris Match, "Scenario-fiction Pour Une Journée De Cocagne: Hunt, Hanke, Goldsmith Tsutsumi Et Les Autres...".

Hanke has worked as an expert witness in financial litigation, specializing in derivatives cases. In the past, he was a principal at Chicago Partners (now Navigant Consulting). In 1994, Hanke, his then-post-doctoral student Christopher Culp, and Nobel laureate Merton Miller waded into the debate over the collapse of Metallgesellschaft AG. Although not officially involved in the case, Hanke, Culp, and Miller made headlines when they revealed that Metallgesellschaft's oil futures hedge was sound, and that it was Deutsche Bank who was responsible for the collapse of the $1.3 billion position.

== Awards ==
- 1998, Named one of the 25 most influential people in the world by World Trade Magazine
- 1998, Distinguished Associate of the International Atlantic Economic Society (In recognition of outstanding contributions to economics)
- 2003, Doctor of Arts, Honoris Causa, Universidad San Francisco de Quito (Quito, Ecuador)
- 2004, Named Profesor Asociado by the Universidad del Azuay (Cuenca, Ecuador)
- 2008, Named Distinguished Professor by the Universitas Pelita Harapan School of Business (Jakarta, Indonesia)
- 2010, Doctorate of Economics, Honoris Causa, Free University of Tbilisi (Tbilisi, Georgia)
- 2012, Doctorate of Economics, Honoris Causa, Istanbul Kültür University (Istanbul, Turkey)
- 2013, Doctorate of Arts, Honoris Causa, Bulgarian Academy of Sciences (Sofia, Bulgaria)
- 2015, Doctorate, Honoris Causa, Varna Free University (Varna, Bulgaria)
- 2015, Named Profesor Visitante by the Universidad Peruana de Ciencias Aplicadas (Lima, Peru)
- 2017, Doctorate, Honoris Causa, Universität Liechtenstein (Vaduz, Liechtenstein)
- 2018, Named the Gottfried von Haberler Professor by the Board of the European Center of Austrian Economics Foundation (ECAEF) (Vaduz, Liechtenstein)
- 2018, Doctorate, Honoris Causa, D.A. Tsenov Academy of Economics (Svishtov, Bulgaria)
- 2020. "Knight of the Order of the Flag," Republic of Albania (Tirana, Albania)

== Commentary and partial bibliography ==
Hanke began writing his "Point of View" column for Forbes magazine in 1997, continuing to do so through 2010. Initially, the column was co-authored with Sir Alan Walters. Hanke was also a contributing editor for Forbes Asia magazine. Hanke was also a columnist at Forbes where he wrote five columns a month, and later became a contributor at National Review. He is a regular contributor to the Opinion pages of The Wall Street Journal, ZeroHedge, Gulf News, OMFIF's The Bulletin, the International Monetary Institute bulletin at the Renmin University of China, and the Westminster Institute, among others.

=== Water resources ===
- "The Demand for Water Under Dynamic Conditions", Water Resources Research, Vol. 6, No. 5, October 1970.
- "Benefit-Cost Analysis Reconsidered: An Evaluation of the Mid-State Project", Water Resources Research, Vol. 10, No. 5, October 1974, (with R. A. Walker).
- "The Relationship Between Water Use Restrictions and Water Use", Water Supply and Management, Vol. 3, 1979, (with A. Mehrez).
- "A Cost-Benefit Analysis of Water Use Restrictions", Water Supply and Management, Vol. 4, No. 4, 1980.
- "Etudes statistiques de prix de revient pour les canalisations d'eau usee", Techniques et Sciences Municipales, 750Annee, No010, Octobre 1980, (with R. W. Wentworth).
- "On the Marginal Cost of Wastewater Services", Land Economics, Vol. 57, No. 4, November 1981.
- "Residential Water Demand: A Pooled, Time-Series, Cross-Section Study of Malmo, Sweden", Water Resources Bulletin, August 1982, (with L. de Maré).

=== Benefit-cost analysis ===
- "Evaluating Federal Water Projects: A Critique of Proposed Standards","Science", Vol. 181, No. 4101, August 24, 1973, (with C. J. Cicchetti, R. K. Davis and R. H. Haveman).
- "Public Investment Criteria for Under-Priced Projects", American Economic Review, Vol. 65, No. 4, September 1975, (with G. F. Mumy).
- "Project Evaluation During Inflation", Water Resources Research, Vol. 11, No. 4, August 1975, (with P. H. Carver and P. Bugg).
- "Land Prices Substantially Underestimate the Value of Environmental Quality", The Review of Economics and Statistics, Vol. 59, No. 3, August 1977, (with W. A. Niskanen).
- "Project Evaluation During Inflation, Revisited: A Solution to Turvey's Relative Price Change Problem", Water Resources Research, Vol. 17, No. 6, December 1981, (with R. Wentworth).
- "'On Turvey's Benefit-Cost 'Short-Cut': A Study of Water Meters", Land Economics, Vol. 58, No. 1, February 1982.

=== Privatization ===
- "The Privatization Debate: An Insider's View, Cato Journal, Vol. 2, No. 3, Winter 1982.
- "Privatization", in: J. Eatwell, M. Milgate and Peter Newman (eds.), The New Palgrave: A Dictionary of Economics, Vol. 3. London: The Macmillan Press Limited, 1987.
- Prospects for Privatization, (ed.). New York, New York: The Academy of Political Science, 1987.
- Privatization and Development (ed.). San Francisco: Institute for Contemporary Studies Press, 1987,
- The Revolution in Development Economics'. Washington, D.C.: The Cato Institute, 1998, (edited with J. A. Dorn and A. A. Walters).
- "Privatizing Waterworks: Learning from the French Experience", Journal of Applied Corporate Finance, Vol. 23, No. 3, Summer 2011 (with Stephen J.K. Walters).
- "Reflections on Private Water Supply: Agency and Equity Issues", Journal of Applied Corporate Finance, Vol. 23, No. 3, Summer 2011 (with Stephen J.K. Walters).

=== Currency boards and dollarization ===
- "Ruble Reform: A Lesson From Keynes", The Cato Journal, Vol. 10, No. 3, Winter 1991, (with K. Schuler)
- "Currency Boards", in: Peter Newman, M. Milgate and J. Eatwell (eds.), The New Palgrave Dictionary of Money and Finance, Vol. 1. London: The Macmillan Press Limited, 1992, (with A. A. Walters).
- "Russian Currency and Finance: A Currency Board Approach To Reform". London/New York: Routledge, 1993, (with L. Jonung and K. Schuler).
- "Currency Boards for Developing Countries: A Handbook". San Francisco: Institute for Contemporary Studies Press, 1994, (with K. Schuler)(2nd Edition, 2015).
- Juntas Monetarias para países en desarrollo: Dinero, inflación y estabilidad económica. Caracas, Venezuela: Institute for Contemporary Studies International Center for Economic Growth, 1995 (with Kurt Schuler)(2nd Edition, 2015).
- Alternative Monetary Regimes For Jamaica. Kingston, Jamaica: Private Sector Organization of Jamaica, 1996 (with K. Schuler).
- "The Case for An Indonesian Currency Board", Journal of Applied Corporate Finance, Vol. 11, No. 4, Winter 1999, (with C. Culp and M. Miller).
- "Dollarization for Argentina", Journal of Applied Corporate Finance , Vol. 12, No. 1, Spring 1999.
- "Currency Boards", Annals of the American Academy of Political and Social Science, no. 579, January–February 2002.
- "On Dollarization and Currency Boards: Error and Deception", The Journal of Policy Reform, v. 5, no. 4. 2002.
- "A Dollarization/Free Banking Blueprint for Argentina", in: Dominick Salvatore, James W. Dean and Thomas D. Willett, (eds.), The Dollarization Debate. Oxford and New York: Oxford University Press, 2003.
- "Stop Venezuela's Economic Death Spiral -- Dollarize, Now","Forbes", August 15, 2017.
- "Public Debt Sustainability: International Perspectives" (with Barry W. Poulson and John Merrifield, eds.), Bloomsbury Publishing, May 2024

=== Monetary analysis ===
- Capital Markets and Development, (ed.). San Francisco: Institute for Contemporary Studies Press, 1991, (author of three chapters) (with A. A. Walters).
- "Towards a Better SDDS", Central Banking, v. XIV, No. 1, August 2003. (with M. Sekerke).
- "Friedman – Float or Fix?", Cato Journal, Vol. 28, No. 2 (Spring/Summer 2008).
- "Reflections on Currency Reform and the Euro", Econ Journal Watch, Vol. 7, No. 1, January 2010.
- "Monetary Misjudgments and Malfeasance", Cato Journal, Vol. 31, No. 3, Fall 2011.
- "The Fed, The Great Enabler", in A. Chafuen, and J. Shelton (eds.) Roads to Sound Money. Washington, D.C.: Atlas Economic Research Foundation, 2012.
- "State Money & Bank Money: Lifting the fog around QE", "Central Banking", June 2016.
- "Basel rules and the banking system: an American perspective", in T. Congdon (ed.) "Money in the Great Recession: Did a Crash in Money Growth Cause the Global Slump?" Northampton, MA: Edward Elgar Publishing, June 2017.
- "Bank Regulation as Monetary Policy: Lessons from the Great Recession", "Cato Journal", Vol 37, No. 2, Spring/Summer 2017 (with M. Sekerke)
- "Capital, Interest, and Waiting: Controversies, Puzzles, and New Additions to Capital Theory" (with Leland B. Yeager), Palgrave Macmillan, September 2024.
- "Making Money Work: How to Rewrite the Rules of Our Financial System" (with Matt Sekerke), Wiley, May 2025.

=== Hyperinflation ===
- "Zimbabwe: From Hyperinflation to Growth", Development Policy Analysis No. 6. Washington, D.C.: The Cato Institute, Center for Global Liberty and Prosperity, June 25, 2008.
- "On the Measurement of Zimbabwe's Hyperinflation", Cato Journal, Vol. 29, No. 2, Spring/Summer 2009 (with Alex K. F. Kwok).
- "World Hyperinflations", in: Randall Parker and Robert Whaples (eds.) The Handbook of Major Events in Economic History, London, UK: Routledge, 2013. (with N. Krus)
  - "On Measuring Hyperinflation: Venezuela's Growth","World Economics", Vol. 18, No.3, July 2017 (with Charles Bushnell).
  - "Zimbabwe Hyperinflates, Again: The 58th Episode of Hyperinflation in History ","Studies in Applied Economics, The Institute for Applied Economics, Global Health, and the Study of Business Enterprise", No.90, October 2017 (with Erik Bostrom).

=== Hanke-Henry Permanent Calendar ===
- "Saudis In A Tight Corner -- The Princes Make Clever Moves & Mistakes, Too","Forbes", May 27, 2017.
- "Taking Calendar Reform Viral", Globe Asia, March 2013

=== Currency and commodity trading and derivatives ===
- "Backwardation Revisited", Friedberg's Commodity and Currency Comments, December 20, 1987.
- "The Walters Critique", Friedberg's Commodity and Currency Comments, January 26, 1992.
- "The wobbly peso", Forbes, July 4, 1994, (with A. A. Walters).
- "Derivative Dingbats", International Economy, July/August 1994, (with C. Culp).
- "Pummeling Derivatives", International Economy, September/October 1994, (with C. Culp).
- "Arbitrage in Argentina", Forbes, December 19, 1994.
- "Is the ruble next?", Forbes, March 9, 1998.
- "Derivatives Diagnosis", The International Economy, Vol. XIII, No. 3, May/June 1999, (with C. Culp and A. Neves).
- "Empire of the Sun: An Economic Interpretation of Enron's Energy Business", Cato Institute Policy Analysis No. 470. Washington, DC: The Cato Institute, February 20, 2003. (with C. L. Culp)
  - "Oil and the Gold Constant","Forbes", February 21, 2017.
  - "Is The 'Oil God' Andy Hall Dead?","Forbes", July 31, 2017

=== Political economy ===
- Hanke, L. (September 11, 1995). "The great modernizer". Forbes. Archived from the original on January 1, 2014 – via HighBeam Research.
- "Economic Freedom, Prosperity, and Equality: A Survey", The Cato Journal, Vol. 17, No. 2, Fall 1997, (with S. J. K. Walters).
- "Démocratie versus liberté. Les leçons tirées de la Constitution Américaine", Commentaire, No. 135, Automne 2011 (with Liliane E. Hanke).
- "On Measuring Greenness: A New Enabling Metric, Please ","The Stern Stewart Institute", June 2014 (with Heinz Schimmelbusch).
- "Did Lockdowns Work? The Verdict on Covid Restrictions" (with Jonas Herby and Lars Jonung), Institute of Economic Affairs, June 2023.

== Criticism ==
=== Currency board ===
In the article "Rupiah Rasputin" written in 1998 for Fortune, Paul Krugman said that Hanke had inflated his connection to former Argentine Finance Minister Domingo Cavallo and quoted the latter as saying that Hanke had only volunteered as a publicist. At the request of President Menem in 1989, Hanke co-authored a book which laid out a detailed blueprint for the introduction of a currency board in Argentina, the preface of which was written by Argentinian congressman José María Ibarbia. In 1995, Hanke was officially appointed an advisor to Minister of Economy Domingo Cavallo. Krugman also argued that creating a currency board in Indonesia "was probably a bad idea right now", because it would interfere with payments for imports or debt service.

=== COVID-19 pandemic ===
In June 2020, Hanke wrongly tweeted that Vietnam was among the "rotten apples" of COVID-19 data after misattributing the country's zero death count as "No Data Reported". After much outcry on social media and a petition to Johns Hopkins University signed by nearly 300 Vietnamese academics demanding an apology, Hanke issued a correction on Twitter stating that the country has a "perfect" record in its fight against COVID-19; the original tweet was also deleted. In an interview with Voice of America following the controversy, Hanke described Vietnam's response to the COVID-19 pandemic was "excellent", and he cited the country's poor record of press freedom as reasons behind his initial suspicion of its coronavirus data.

In January 2022, Hanke co-authored a working paper arguing that lockdowns had "little to no effect on COVID-19 mortality" but had "devastating" effects on society. It was cited by American conservative news website Fox News, which stated that "lockdowns should be rejected out of hand". The paper was criticized as being "fundamentally flawed" by various medical experts, including PolitiFact, and labelled as "misleading" by fact checker Health Feedback, while epidemiologist Gideon Meyerowitz-Katz tweeted that it was "a very weird review paper". PolitiFact concluded that Hanke had "repeatedly elevated false claims about the pandemic", citing his previous remark on Twitter, which stated that national lockdowns and COVID-19 vaccine policies are "fascist". An op-ed on the Chicago Tribune also called the paper "as scientific as a Joe Rogan rant". An article on Foreign Policy criticized Hanke's "appalling pseudo-science" and described him as an economist fighting a "war against public health". On June 5, 2023, the working paper was published as a peer-reviewed book by the Institute of Economic Affairs. On November 28, 2024, the working paper was published in the peer-reviewed journal Public Choice.

In February 2022, Hanke shared a video showing a man on fire and claimed he was protesting the Italian government's COVID-19 vaccine mandates. A fact check by Reuters refuted the claim and concluded that the incident had "nothing to do with COVID-19". The family of the man also released a statement condemning speculation about links to vaccination.

=== Russian invasion of Ukraine ===
Since the 2022 Russian invasion of Ukraine, Hanke has voiced opposition to the sanctions against Russia, calling them "for losers". In October 2022, the Center for Countering Disinformation, an agency within the National Security and Defense Council of Ukraine, placed Hanke on its "blacklist" of Russian propagandists.

In December 2022, Hanke shared a video on Twitter purportedly showing Slovaks protested against their government's support for Ukraine and "the heavy burden it's imposing on them". The video was later revealed to be from an unrelated demonstration in 2018 following the murder of investigative journalist Ján Kuciak. Hanke's tweet was later deleted after outcry on social media and criticisms from multiple Slovak media outlets accusing him of spreading misinformation about the war in Ukraine. Hanke was also condemned by former CNN Norway's managing director Morten Øverbye, as well as Miroslav Wlachovský, the foreign policy adviser to Slovak Prime Minister Eduard Heger.
