= Barnett critique =

The Barnett critique, named for the work of William A. Barnett in monetary economics, argues that internal inconsistency between the aggregation theory used to produce monetary aggregates and the economic theory used to produce the models within which the aggregates are used are responsible for the appearance of unstable demand and supply for money. The Barnett critique has produced a long and growing literature on monetary aggregation and index number theory and the use of the resulting aggregates in econometric modeling and monetary policy.

The critique runs counter to another large literature arguing that money does not matter in macroeconomic policy and advocating monetary policy disconnected from monetary measurement. That alternative view was first advocated by John Maynard Keynes and challenged by Milton Friedman. More recently the counter view has been advocated by Michael Woodford based on theory originated by Knut Wicksell. Although separate from the Lucas critique, the Barnett and Lucas critiques share the view that models based on internally inconsistent economic theory can produce misleading inferences and misguided policy.

== History ==
The term “Barnett critique” was first coined by the British economists, Chrystal and MacDonald (1994), in a paper presented at a St. Louis Federal Reserve Bank conference and subsequently published by that bank. A more recent representation and analysis of that critique was published by Belongia and Ireland (2014). The relationship between the critique and monetary policy during a period of over four decades was the subject of Barnett’s book, Getting It Wrong: How Faulty Monetary Statistics Undermine the Fed, the Financial System, and the Economy, published by MIT Press in 2012. In that book (page 217), he explains the critique as follows:

“Data construction and measurement procedures imply the theory that can rationalize those procedures. Unless that implied theory is internally consistent with the theory used in applications of those data in modeling and policy, the data and their applications are incoherent. Such internal inconsistencies can produce the appearance of structural change, when there has been none.”

The book emphasizes the cause and consequences of the many paradoxes in the econometric literature about historical monetary policy and the economy since 1970. For example, he represents (in page 18) the association with the recent Great Recession as follows:

“The paradoxes fed into the misperceptions that distorted expectations and thereby eventually damaged the economy. Internal inconsistencies exist between the way the data were produced and the way they were used. These internal inconsistencies have become known as the Barnett critique.”

That book won the Association of American Publishers Award for Professional and Scholarly Excellence (the PROSE Awards) for the best book published in the field of economics during 2012.

== Literature ==
Much of the literature produced by the Barnett critique uses the Divisia monetary aggregates index, rather than central banks’ usual simple sum monetary aggregates. The Divisia monetary aggregates were originated by Barnett (1980), while employed on the staff of the Federal Reserve Board, and now are maintained and provided to the public by the Center for Financial Stability in New York City and by Bloomberg LP through its Bloomberg Terminal. Divisia monetary aggregates are provided officially by the Bank of England along with the National Bank of Poland and the Bank of Israel. Divisia monetary aggregates are maintained for internal use by the European Central Bank, the Bank of Japan, and the International Monetary Fund. Those aggregates are provided to the European Central Bank’s Governing Council at its meetings. Divisia monetary aggregates are available from public or private sources for over 40 countries, as indexed in the international economics library maintained online by the Center for Financial Stability.

A conference in honor of the Barnett critique will be held at the Bank of England in London on May 23–24, 2017. The Barnett critique was a primary motivation for the creation of the international Society for Economic Measurement. While controversial as potential targets of monetary policy, the Divisia monetary aggregates have been the subject of increasing research on monthly indicators of the state of the economy, as emphasized by the Center for Financial Stability. An example of the potential indicator role is its relevancy to nominal income target proposals, since nominal GDP is measured only quarterly.

== See also ==
- Divisia monetary aggregates index
- Dynamic inconsistency
- Lucas critique
- Nominal income target
- Society for Economic Measurement
- William A. Barnett
