= VFU =

VFU may stand for:

- Varna Free University, a university in Bulgaria
- Vegetarian Federal Union, former vegetarian organization
- Verksamhetsförlagd utbildning (English: "Workplace training"), the practical school placement part of teacher education in Sweden
- Veterinární a farmaceutická univerzita Brno, a veterinary and pharmacy university in the Czech Republic
- Victorian Farmers' Union, an Australian farmers' organisation and political party
