= Divisia index =

A Divisia index is a theoretical construct to create index number series for continuous-time data on prices and quantities of goods exchanged. The name comes from François Divisia who first proposed and formally analyzed the indexes in 1926, and discussed them in related 1925 and 1928 works.

The Divisia index is designed to incorporate quantity and price changes over time from subcomponents that are measured in different units, such as labor hours and equipment investment and materials purchases, and to summarize them in a time series that summarizes the changes in quantities and/or prices. The resulting index number series is unitless, like other index numbers.

In practice, economic data are not measured in continuous time. Thus, when a series is said to be a Divisia index, it usually means the series follows a procedure that makes a close analogue in discrete time periods, usually the Törnqvist index procedure or the Fisher Ideal Index procedures.

== Uses ==
Divisia-type indices are used in these contexts for example:

- Multifactor productivity calculations use quantity indexes which incorporate changes in the expenditure share and overall quality of the underlying goods, and are then multiplied by prices. A Divisia index of all measured outputs can be divided by a Divisia index of all measured inputs to get an estimate of the productivity change that occurred apart from the changes in inputs.
- Aggregation of different monetary pools, e.g. cash and credit card borrowing and different currencies. Here the pools of various monetary aggregates are treated as a quantities, and the prices are usually taken as fixed, but their weights vary -- for example, the Bank of England has an index of the money stock that is available for transactions. The index weights the various money pools by the likelihood they will be used in transactions in the near run -- physical cash and checking accounts are ready to be spent, whereas long term bonds which are not ready to be spent. The interest rate received on the various money pools is a measure of the weight; pounds in cash count more than pounds in bonds. Movement of money from one form to another affects the index whereas it would not affect a simple sum of the money stock; thus the index is more useful to track the money ready-to-transact than a sum would be. Divisia monetary aggregate indexes for the United States, based on William A. Barnett's (1980) derivation, were previously available from the St. Louis Federal Reserve Bank. Those aggregates, along with newer extensions, are now available from the Center for Financial Stability in New York City.
- Some price indexes incorporate changes in the quantity, expenditure share, and quality on various underlying goods as well as the changes in prices for them, although the term Divisia index is not often used in the official descriptions of consumer price indexes, producer price indexes, or personal consumption indexes. Various price indexes use the Törnqvist, Fisher-Ideal, or other procedures which produce close approximations to a Divisia index.

== Data input ==
The theory of the Divisia indexes of goods (say, inputs to a production process, or prices for consumer goods) uses these components as data input:

- there are $n$ inputs, where $n$ is a whole number
- $t$ is a continuous index of time, starting at $0$
- $p_{i}(t)$ are continuous series of price data for each input from $i=0$ to $i=n$
- $q_{i}(t)$ are continuous series of quantity data for each input. The shifting importance of the various goods are measured, for prices, by the changes in quantities, and for quantities by the changes in prices. One might therefore use something different from literal price or quantity to measure these importance/weights.
- Arbitrary index based levels $P(0)$ and $Q(0)$ are selected -- in practice, $1$, or $100$, or one is chosen in this way and the other is chosen to meet the criteria that $P(0)\cdot Q(0)$ equals the actual amount of the transactions, or value, exchanged:

$$\sum_{i=0}^{n} p_{i}(0)\cdot q_{i}(0) = P(0)Q(0) .$$

Then a price index $P(t)$ and quantity index $Q(t)$ are the solution to a differential equation and if $P(0)$ and $Q(0)$ were chosen suitably the series summarize all transactions in the sense that for all $t$:

$$\sum_{i=0}^{n} p_{i}(t)\cdot q_{i}(t) = P(t)Q(t).$$

== Discrete-time approximations ==
In practice, discrete time analogues to Divisia indexes are the ones computed and used. To define and compute changes in a discrete time index closely analogous to a Divisia index from time 0 to time 1:

- Gather price and quantity for each component, using measures that have been adjusted for quality change if possible
- Compute cost/price/expenditure fractions for each component at time 1 and time 2. Average the time-1 and time-2 fractions for each component. Use those averages as the 'weights' for the component. Define the weights to be averages of expenditures shares or cost shares over the period of change:

$$s_{j,t}^{*}=\frac{1}{2}(s_{j,t}+s_{j,t-1})$$

(See, for example, Divisia monetary aggregates index.)

- The value of the index at time 0 is an arbitrary normalization, usually chosen to be 1 or 100 which makes it easier to make quick inferences about overall fractional or percentage changes.

== History ==
Divisia indexes were proposed and analyzed formally by François Divisia in 1926, and discussed in related 1925 and 1928 works.
