= Steven Achikor =

Nigerian singer and songwriter

- Born: Steven Efe Achikor; Delta State, Nigeria
- Genres: R&B; soul; neo soul; pop
- Occupations: Singer-songwriter; musician
- Instrument: Vocals
- Years active: 2015 – present
- Label: Independent artist

Steven Achikor is a Nigerian R&B/pop singer and songwriter. He was a finalist in the Bulgarian X Factor in 2015. Nowadays working as an independent artist, Steven Achikor collaborates with various Bulgarian artists and musicians worldwide. His debut album "Smile" was released on 22 December 2023.

== Career ==
=== Early life ===
Achikor was born in Delta State, Nigeria in a big religious family, having 8 brothers and 2 sisters. When he was a kid, his dream was to become a footballer. He wanted to move to the United States, but in the early 2015 he started studying Informatics in the Varna Free University in Bulgaria. He decided to sign for the 4th season of X Factor Bulgaria and made it through the finals.

=== 2015:X Factor Bulgaria ===
After coming to Bulgaria Steven heard for X Factor casting and signed for it. He made it through the finals as one of the three foreign people in the season 4 of the show. In the 4th live show he sang the Bulgarian song Облаче ле бяло and the judges stated that his performance was the best of the night as of the great feeling text and brilliant performance. On the 8th live show Stevie was for the first time on eliminations, but with the performance of the song Ordinary People he was saved, making one of his teammates to leave the show.

The X Factor performances and results
Episode	Theme	Song	Result
First audition	Free choice	"If There's Any Justice"	Through to Six Chair Challenge
Bootcamp	Free performance	"Killing Me Softly"	Through to Judge's houses
Judges' houses	Free choice	"You Are Not Alone"	Through to live shows
Live show 1	Number one's	"Let It Be"	Safe
Live show 2	Halloween	"Superstition"	Safe
Live show 3	First love	"Endless Love"	Safe
Live show 4	Bulgarian hits	"Облаче ле бяло"	Safe
Live show 5	Movie Soundtracks	"Can You Feel the Love Tonight"	Safe
Live show 6	Divas and Heroes	"Heal the World"	Safe
Live show 7	Disco hits	"Just Another Day"	Safe
Live show 8	International hits	"7 Seconds"	Bottom two
Live show 8	Final showdown	"Ordinary People"	Bottom two
Christmas show	Christmas edition	"Amazing Grace"	No eliminations
Live show 9	Love is everything	"I Believe I Can Fly"	Safe
Live show 9	Love is everything	"I'll Be There" (with Christiana Louizu)	Safe
Live show 10	Tears and laught	"Hurt"	Left the show (5th)
Live show 10	Tears and laught	"Forget You"	Left the show (5th)
Live show 10	Final showdown	"All of Me"	Left the show (5th)

=== 2016-present: Solo career ===
Achikor released his first single featuring Nevena Peykova on 3 June 2016. In 2018 he released his first song in Bulgarian language - "Da Obicham". Currently he is working with various artists and musicians in Bulgaria and all over the world. The single "Love you" was released on the 31 July 2023. His debut album came out on 22 December 2023.

== Discography ==
List of singles as main artist
Title	Year	Album
Da Izbyagame (Nevena Peykova feat Steven Achikor)	2016	—N/a
Shaking It Up (Steven Achikor feat. Fabrizio Parisi)	2017	—N/a
Shaking It Up - Ahmet Kilic Remix (Steven Achikor feat. Fabrizio Parisi)	2017	—N/a
Da Obicham (Steven Achikor)	2018	—N/a
You're the One (Amstaboi feat. Steven Achikor)	2020	—N/a
Tame the Fire (Steven Achikor)	2020	—N/a
Ochite (Vessy Boneva feat. Steven Achikor)	2022	—N/a
Love you (Steven Achikor)	2023	—N/a
Give me (Steven Achikor)	2023	Smile
Fine (Steven Achikor feat. Kola Slim)	2023	Smile
High way (Steven Achikor)	2023	Smile
Smile (Steven Achikor)	2023	Smile
Need you (Steven Achikor)	2023	Smile
Make Love to You (Steven Achikor)	2024	—N/a
Follow (Steven Achikor)	2024	—N/a
Again (Steven Achikor)	2024	—N/a
Yes I Do (Steven Achikor)	2024	—N/a
