= Isabel Horta Correia =

Portuguese economist

- Born: Lisbon, Portugal
- Occupations: Economist, university professor and researcher
- Known for: Head of Economic Studies at the Bank of Portugal (2013-2018)

Academic background
- Education: Catholic University of Portugal
- Thesis: Growth in Open Economies

Isabel Horta Correia is a Portuguese full professor of economics at the Catholic University of Portugal. From 2013 to 2018 she also held a senior management position at Portugal's central bank, the Banco de Portugal, as head of the Department of Economic Studies.

== Training ==
Maria Isabel Sanchez Horta Correia Rio Carvalho's parents came from Vila Real de Santo António in the Algarve region of Portugal, but she was born in the Portuguese capital of Lisbon. She graduated in economics from the Catholic University of Portugal in 1980 and obtained a PhD in economics from the same university in 1993, with a thesis on "Growth in Open Economies".

== Career ==
Correia joined the School of Business and Economics of the Catholic University of Portugal after completing her PhD and became a full professor in 2004. Her research area is macroeconomics, specifically, economic growth, economic cycles, monetary policy, fiscal policy, and distribution of wealth. From 2001 she worked as a researcher at the Bank of Portugal and in 2013 she was appointed head of the Department of Economic Studies. This appointment led to some slight controversy as the Bank initially advertised an open competition for the post but then promoted Correia on the grounds that none of the candidates had the "combination of attributes necessary to ensure the required standard of leadership and team management". She left the post in 2018.

Correia has published in a large number of peer-reviewed international journals, including the Journal of Political Economy, Review of Economic Studies, Journal of Monetary Economics, Journal of Public Economics and the European Economic Review. She is an associate editor of the Portuguese Economic Journal and of Macroeconomic Dynamics. She has been a member of the panel appraising proposals for European Research Council grants and an evaluator for the Fundação para a Ciência e Tecnologia (Portuguese Foundation for Science and Technology - FCT), the body in Portugal responsible for scientific research grant allocations.

== Political activities ==
In 2009, the small Portuguese centrist political party, Hope for Portugal Movement (Movimento Esperança Portugal - MEP), announced that Correia would head its list of candidates for the Algarve region of the country in the 2009 elections for the Assembly of the Republic. She was not successful and the party folded three years later, having failed to win any seats in the Assembly or the European Parliament.
