= Apostolos Serletis =

Greek economist (born 1954)

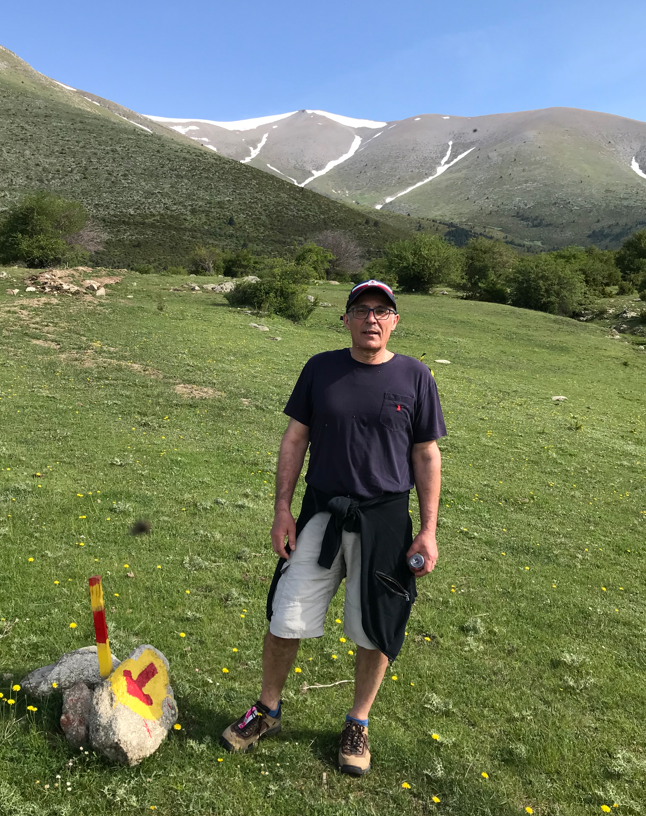
- Professor Apostolos Serletis
- Born: December 8, 1954 (age 71); Karya, Larissa, Greece

Academic background
- Education: University of Piraeus, University of Windsor, McMaster University
- Influences: William A. Barnett

Academic work
- Discipline: Macroeconomics and Econometrics; Monetary Economics and Financial Economics
- School or tradition: neoclassical economics
- Institutions: University of Calgary
- Website: Information at IDEAS / RePEc

Apostolos Serletis (Greek: Απόστολος Σερλέτης; born 1954) is a Greek economist who is a professor of Economics at the University of Calgary.

Serletis was born in Greece in 1954. He earned his B.A. degree in economics from the University of Piraeus in 1976, his M.A. in economics from the University of Windsor in 1979 and his Ph.D. in economics from McMaster University in 1984. After graduating from McMaster, he became a member of the Department of Economics at the University of Calgary.

== Personal life ==
Apostolos Serletis lives in Calgary, Alberta, Canada with his wife Aglaia.

== Fields of interest ==
- Macroeconomics
- Econometrics
- Monetary and Financial Economics
- Nonlinear and Complex Dynamics

== Research and publications ==
Apostolos Serletis has published more than 300 journal papers in top economics and finance journals such as: Journal of Economic Literature, Journal of Econometrics, Journal of Monetary Economics, Journal of Money Credit and Banking, Journal of Applied Econometrics, Journal of Banking and Finance, Macroeconomic Dynamics, Econometric Reviews, Energy Economics, The Energy Journal, Open Economies Review, Economics Letters, Journal of Macroeconomics, etc.

His research draws from a large number of areas, such as macroeconomics, monetary economics, flexible functional forms and demand systems, and nonlinear and complex dynamics.

Serletis also Canadianized a number of leading U.S. text books, including Financial Markets and Institutions (with Frederic Mishkin and Stanley Eakins), The Economics of Money, Banking, and Financial Markets (with Frederic Mishkin), Macroeconomics: A Modern Approach (with Robert Barro), and Principles of Economics (with Glenn Hubbard, Anthony O'Brien, and Jason Childs).

== Research Grants ==
Serletis received a number of research grants, a University of Calgary Research Fellowship in 2002, the (University of Calgary) Faculty of Arts Distinguished Research Award three times (in 1997, 2003, and 2011), and a University of Calgary Professorship from 2006 to 2011.

== Text books ==
- Financial Markets and Institutions, with Frederic S. Mishkin and Stanley G. Eakins. 1st Canadian Edition, Pearson: Toronto, 2004.
- The Demand for Money: Theoretical and Empirical Approaches. This book has a foreword by David Laidler. 2nd Edition, Springer, 2007.
- Macroeconomics: A Modern Approach, with Robert J. Barro. 1st Canadian Edition, Nelson: Toronto, 2010.
- The Economics of Money, Banking, and Financial Markets, with Frederic S. Mishkin. 8th Canadian Edition, Pearson: Toronto, 2023.
- Principles of Economics, with R. Glenn Hubbard, Anthony Patrick O'Brien, and Jason Childs. 4th Canadian Edition, Pearson: Toronto (forthcoming, 2024).

== Books (General) ==
1. The Theory of Monetary Aggregation (2000), Barnett, William A. and Apostolos Serletis, Elsevier.
2. Functional Structure Inference (2007), Barnett, William A. and Apostolos Serletis, Elsevier.
3. Money and the Economy (2006), Serletis, Apostolos, World Scientific.
4. Quantitative and Empirical Analysis of Energy Markets (2013), Serletis Apostolos, World Scientific.
5. Macroeconomic Policy in the Canadian Economy (2002), Serletis Apostolos and Panos Afxentiou, Kluwer.
6. Interfuel Substitution (2012), Serletis ApostolosWorld Scientific.
7. Oil Price Uncertainty (2012), Serletis Apostolos, World Scientific.

== Professional associations ==
He is a Fellow of the Royal Society of Canada, President of the Society for Economic Measurement, Co-Editor of Macroeconomic Dynamics (Cambridge University Press) and the Journal of Economic Asymmetries (Elsevier), Editor-in-Chief of the Open Economies Review (Springer), and Associate Editor of Energy Economics (Elsevier). He has also edited a number of scholarly collections, including a special issue of the prestigious Journal of Econometrics with James Heckman, the 2000 Nobel Laureate of the University of Chicago.
