= Walter Erwin Diewert =

Canadian economist

Walter Erwin Diewert (born 1941) is a Canadian economist. He was born in Vancouver, British Columbia. He completed a B.A. degree in 1963, and an M.A. in mathematics in 1964, both at the University of British Columbia. He completed a Ph.D. at the University of California at Berkeley in 1968. He is a professor of economics at the University of British Columbia, where he has been a member of the faculty since 1970, and also has a joint appointment at the University of New South Wales. He is also a Vice President of the Society for Economic Measurement (SEM).

He is one of the world's leading economists dealing with complex empirical issues related to the measurement of price indexes and productivity. He coauthored a reference book on the mathematics of index numbers.

In a major contribution in 2012, his analysis suggested that Statistics Canada has significantly understated the growth of productivity in Canada. In 2005, he received the Shiskin Memorial Award for Economic Statistics for his contributions to index number theory. In 2008, he was honored as a Distinguished Fellow of the American Economic Association.
