= François Divisia =

French economist

François Divisia (1889–1964) was a French economist most noted for the Divisia index and the Divisia monetary aggregates index.

== Notable publications ==
- Divisia, F. (1925) L'indice monétaire et la théorie de la monnaie. Revue d'écon. polit., XXXIX, Nos. 4, 5, 6: 842–61, 980–1008, 1121–51.
- Divisia, F. (1926) L'indice monétaire et la théorie de la monnaie. Revue d'écon. polit., LX, No. 1: 49–81.
- Divisia, F. (1928) L'économie rationnelle, Paris: Gaston Doin et Cie.
