= Center for Countering Disinformation =

State body of Ukraine

- Центр протидії дезінформації
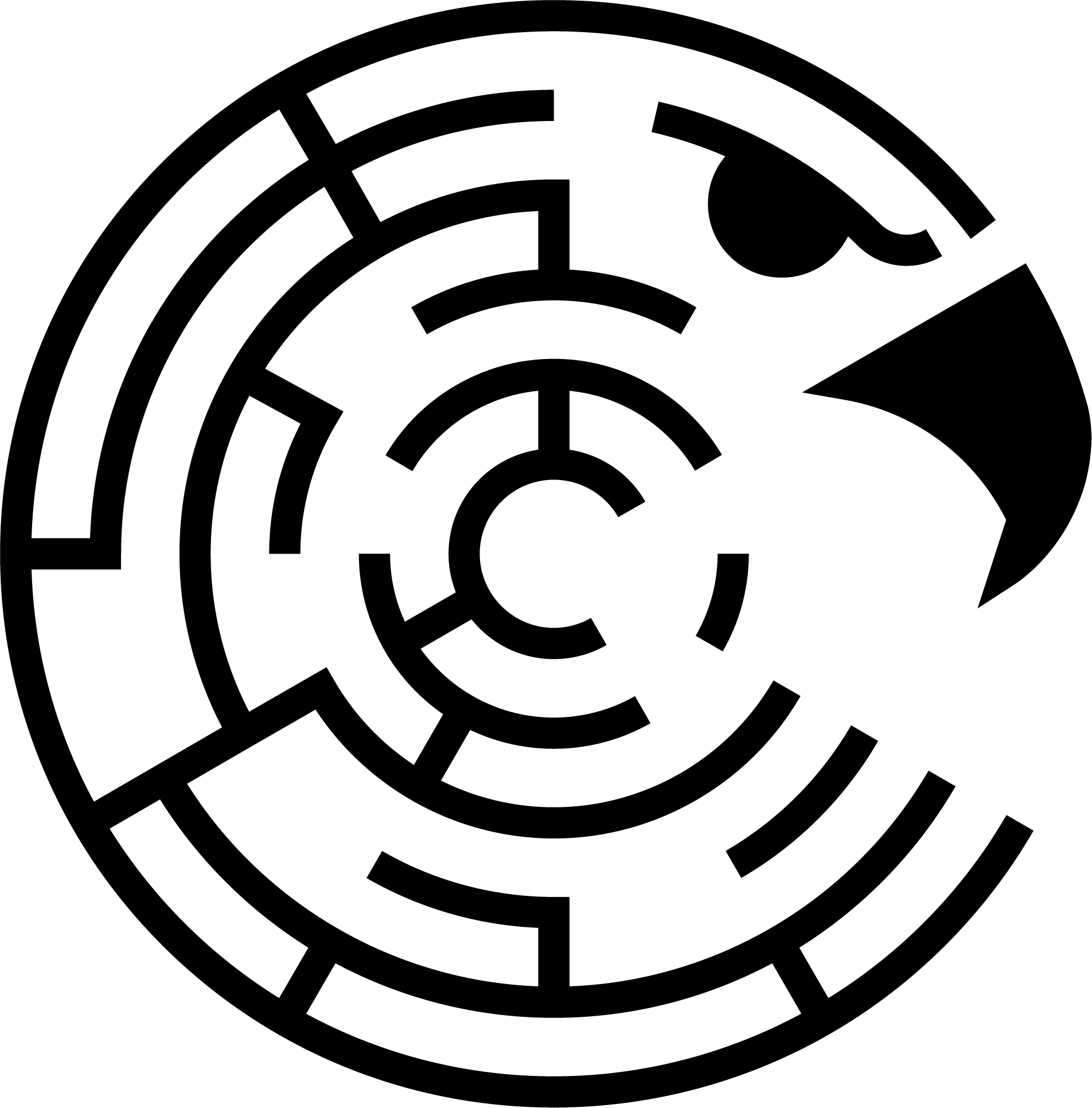

Agency overview
- Formed: March 11, 2021
- Jurisdiction: Ukraine
- Headquarters: 11, Bankova Street, Kyiv, Ukraine, 01220
- Employees: 52
- Agency executives: Andriy Kovalenko, head of the center
- Parent agency: National Security and Defense Council of Ukraine
- Website: Official website

The Center for Countering Disinformation (Ukrainian: Центр протидії дезінформації, romanized: Tsentr protydii dezinformatsii) is a working body of the National Security and Defense Council of Ukraine established in accordance with a decision of that council dated March 11, 2021 "On the creation of the Center for Countering Disinformation", and enacted by Presidential Decree No. 106 of March 19, 2021.

The center ensures the implementation of measures to counteract current and projected threats to Ukraine's national security and national interests in the information sphere, ensuring Ukraine's information security, identifying and counteracting disinformation, effectively countering enemy propaganda, destructive information influences and campaigns, and preventing attempts to manipulate public opinion.

== History ==
Established on March 11, 2021, it is a body of the National Security and Defense Council of Ukraine.

On April 2, Polina Lysenko was appointed head of the center by President Volodymyr Zelenskyy's decree. She previously held the position of assistant to the first deputy director of the National Anti-Corruption Bureau of Ukraine in 2015–2019 and worked in the Ukrainian Prosecutor General's Office in 2019–2020.

The center started functioning on April 6, 2021.

On May 7, 2021, by his Decree No. 187/2021, the President approved the regulation which stipulates that the center is subordinated to the National Security and Defense Council of Ukraine, the general direction and coordination of its activity is performed by the Secretary of the National Security and Defense Council. The center employs 52 people. The regulation also defines the concept, aims, functions, and basic rights and responsibilities of the center.

On August 19, 2021, Polina Lysenko, the head of the center, took maternity leave, and the duties of her position were entrusted to her first deputy, Andriy Shapovalov.

On April 20, 2023, the President of Ukraine Volodymyr Zelenskyy, by his decree No. 233/2023, dismissed Polina Lysenko from the post of head of the Center for Countering Disinformation, according to the submitted application.

== Aim ==
The Center for Countering Disinformation activities encompass such areas as defense, fight against crime and corruption, foreign and domestic policy, economy, infrastructure, environment, healthcare, social sphere, and science and technology direction. But the main focus is on countering the spread of misinformation on the Internet and fakes in the media. The center does not have punitive functions for misinformation and will not be able to apply sanctions, but may issue submissions to the National Security and Defense Council on certain violations.

== Criticism ==
In July 2022, the Center for Countering Disinformation published a list of persons accused of promoting messages similar to Russian propaganda. Journalist Glenn Greenwald, included in the list, called it "McCarthyite idiocy" and several other persons from the list rejected the accusation. Quincy Institute for Responsible Statecraft criticized the list as a misstep from democratic values such as freedom of speech, an apparent attempt to discredit and silence political scientist John Mearsheimer and other U.S. and Western analysts whose views differ from the Ukrainian government. The list of Russian propagandists was removed from the website of the Center for Countering Disinformation, but its copy is saved in the Internet Archive. On October 3, 2022, an updated list appeared on the center's website.

Peter Goettler, writing for libertarian Cato Institute, notes that setting up government agencies, such as the Center for Countering Disinformation, to separate truth from disinformation is an unwise idea, since they may attack opinions that do not align with the government's view. Gettler disagrees with the blacklisting of his colleague Doug Bandow and emphasizes actions like "the establishment of ill-advised truth and disinformation bureaus, and the unfair smearing of eminent scholars" do not contribute to Ukraine's reputation. He calls on Kyiv to drop the accusations and apologize.
