= Verksamhetsförlagd utbildning =

Swedish teacher education program

Verksamhetsförlagd utbildning (VFU) is a part of the teacher education programme in Sweden, whereby the student performs practice at a school. The time spent on VFU is "at least 15 högskolepoäng in the general part of the education and at least 15 hp in each specialization." The purpose is to prepare and give perspectives for the future profession.
