= Society for Economic Measurement =

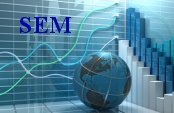
- The logo of the Society for Economic Measurement
- Formation: August 24, 2013
- Legal status: Learned society in economics
- Purpose: To promote research on economic measurement, using advanced tools from economic theory, econometrics, aggregation theory, experimental economics, mathematics, and statistics
- Region served: United States, Internationally
- President: William A. Barnett, University of Kansas and Center for Financial Stability
- Main organ: Executive Committee
- Website: sem.society.cmu.edu

The Society for Economic Measurement, or SEM, is a scientific learned society in the field of economics. It was founded on August 24, 2013 by William A. Barnett in order to "promote research on economic measurement, using advanced tools from economic theory, econometrics, aggregation theory, experimental economics, mathematics, and statistics". Nobel Laureate Apostolos Serletis took over as the society's second president in 2019. In 2024, Gaetano Antinolfi became the third and current president of the society. The goal of the SEM is to promote in economics—given the constraints of a social science—the implementation of the strict rules of measurement and data gathering standards used in the physical sciences. Carnegie Mellon University, the Center for Financial Stability, and the University of Kansas are sponsors of the society.

== Activities ==
- The inaugural conference of the SEM was held at the Harper Center of the University of Chicago's Booth School of Business on August 18–20, 2014. It was co-sponsored by the Becker Friedman Institute at the University of Chicago.
- The 2nd SEM conference was held at the OECD in Paris on July 22–24, 2015.
- The 3rd SEM conference was held in Thessaloniki, Greece on July 6–8, 2016.
- The 4th SEM conference was held at the Massachusetts Institute of Technology on July 26–28, 2017.
- The 5th SEM conference was held at Xiamen University on Xiamen Island in China in June 2108.
- The 6th SEM Conference was held at Goethe University in Frankfurt, with cosponsorship by the European Central Bank, on August 16–18, 2019.
- The 7th SEM Conference was held at University of Calgary in Calgary, on August 11–14, 2022.
- The 8th SEM Conference was held at University of Milano-Bicocca in Milan, with cosponsorship by the University of Milan, on June 29–July 1, 2023.
- The 9th SEM Conference will be held at Georgia Institute of Technology in Atlanta, on August 1–3, 2024.

== SEM Fellows ==
The full list of the 2013-2014 SEM Fellows is posted here: SEM 2013-2014 Fellows.

== Officers ==
A. EXECUTIVE COMMITTEE:

1. President:

- Gaetano Antinolfi, Washington University in St. Louis

2. Vice Presidents:

- Yves Balasko, University of York, UK
- Ernst Berndt (MIT professor), MIT
- Walter Erwin Diewert, U of British Columbia, Canada
- Ester Faia, Goethe University, Germany
- Kaye Husbands Fealing, Georgia Institute of Technology
- Dennis Fixler, Bureau of Economic Analysis, Department of Commerce
- Barbara Fraumeni, U. of Southern Maine; Central U. of Finance and Economics, Beijing
- Dale Jorgenson, Harvard
- Ken Judd, Stanford (Hoover)
- Julia Lane, New York University
- Jacques Mairesse, CREST (ENSAE, Paris), UNU-MERIT (Maastricht University, Maastricht)
- J. Peter Neary, Oxford U., U.K.
- Paul Schreyer, Deputy Director, OECD Statistics Directorate, Paris
- Apostolos Serletis, U. of Calgary, Canada
- Karl Shell, Cornell
- Marcel Timmer, University of Groningen, Netherlands
- Sevin Yeltekin, Carnegie Mellon U.

3. Members at Large:

- James Heckman, U. of Chicago and University College, Dublin

4. Member by Appointment of the Center for Financial Stability:

- Lawrence Goodman, President, Center for Financial Stability, NY City

5. Secretary-Treasurer:

- Stephen Spear, Carnegie Mellon U.

B. COUNCIL:

Charter Council Members:

- Bert Balk, Rotterdam School of Management, Netherlands
- Marcelle Chauvet, U. of California Riverside
- Robert Feenstra, U. of California at Davis
- Kevin Fox, U. of New South Wales
- Steve Hanke, Johns Hopkins U.
- Jonathan Haskel, Imperial College, London, U.K.
- Robert Hill, U. of Graz, Austria
- Charles Hulten, U. of Maryland
- Robert Inklaar, U. of Groningen, Netherlands
- Peter Ireland, Boston College
- Fredj Jawadi, U. of Évry and France Business School, France
- Koji Nomura, Keio U., Tokyo, Japan
- Lee Ohanian, UCLA
- Philippe de Peretti, University of Paris 1, Sorbonne, France
- Prasada Rao, University of Queensland, Australia
- Stephen Turnovsky, U. of Washington
- Myrna Wooders, Vanderbilt University
- Nicholas Yannelis, U. of Iowa
