= Macroeconomic Dynamics =

- Discipline: Macroeconomics
- Language: English
- Edited by: William A. Barnett

Publication details
- History: 1997–present
- Publisher: Cambridge University Press
- Frequency: 8/year
- Impact factor: 0.975 (2014)

Standard abbreviations
- ISO 4: Macroecon. Dyn.

Indexing
- ISSN: 1365-1005 (print); 1469-8056 (web)
- OCLC no.: 45049472

Links
- Journal homepage; Online access; Online archive

Macroeconomic Dynamics is a peer-reviewed academic journal covering macroeconomics. The editor-in-chief is William A. Barnett (University of Kansas) and it is published by Cambridge University Press. It was established in 1997 with a frequency of 4 issues per year, but through the years the issues per year increased, and the journal has published 8 issues a year since 2013. In addition to regular scientific articles, the journal occasionally publishes interviews with leading scholars in economics.
