= William A. Barnett =

American economist

- Born: October 30, 1941 (age 84); Boston, Massachusetts

Academic background
- Education: Carnegie Mellon University (Ph.D., 1974). University of California at Berkeley (M.B.A., 1965). Massachusetts Institute of Technology (B.S., 1963)
- Influences: Henri Theil, Milton Friedman, Franco Modigliani, Simon Kuznets, Robert Lucas, Jr., Thomas J. Sargent.

Academic work
- Discipline: Economic measurement, macroeconomics, monetary econometrics, consumer demand and production modelling, nonlinear dynamics.
- School or tradition: neoclassical economics
- Institutions: University of Kansas; Washington University in St. Louis; University of Texas at Austin; Johns Hopkins University
- Notable ideas: Originator of the Divisia monetary aggregates. Editor of Macroeconomic Dynamics. President of Society for Economic Measurement. Director of Center for Financial Stability. Director of the Institute for Nonlinear Dynamical Inference at RUDN University in Moscow.
- Awards: John C. Wright Outstanding Graduate Mentor Award. (2017). Higuchi Research Award (2013). American Publishers Award for Professional and Scholarly Excellence (the PROSE Awards) (2012).
- Website: Information at IDEAS / RePEc

William Arnold Barnett (born October 30, 1941) is an American economist, whose current work is in the fields of chaos, bifurcation, and nonlinear dynamics in socioeconomic contexts, econometric modeling of consumption and production, and the study of the aggregation problem and the challenges of measurement in economics.

== Education ==
Barnett received his B.S. degree in mechanical engineering from Massachusetts Institute of Technology, his M.B.A. from the University of California, Berkeley, and his M.A. and Ph.D. from Carnegie Mellon University.

== Positions ==
Barnett is currently the Oswald Distinguished Professor of Macroeconomics at the University of Kansas and Director of the Center for Financial Stability, in New York City. He is also a Fellow of the TANDO Institute and a Fellow of the Johns Hopkins Institute for Applied Economics, Global Health, and the Study of Business Enterprise. He is the Founder and was First President of the Society for Economic Measurement. He is also the director of the Institute for Nonlinear Dynamical Inference, founded at RUDN University in Moscow but now at the University of Kansas.

He was previously a research economist at the Board of Governors of the Federal Reserve in Washington, D.C.; Stuart Centennial Professor of Economics at the University of Texas at Austin; and Professor of Economics at Washington University in St. Louis. Prior to becoming an economist, he worked from 1963 to 1969, as an engineer at Rocketdyne division of the Rockwell International Corporation on development of the F-1 and J-2 rocket engines during Apollo program.

== Research ==
His research is in macroeconomics and econometrics. He is Founding President of the Society for Economic Measurement, Founding Editor of the Cambridge University Press journal, Macroeconomic Dynamics and of the Emerald Group Publishing monograph series, International Symposia in Economic Theory and Econometrics, and originator of the Divisia monetary aggregates and the "Barnett critique".

In consumer demand and production modelling, he originated the Laurent series approach to specification design and the seminonparametric approach using the Müntz–Szász theorem. His publications on bifurcation analysis and nonlinear dynamics have shown that robustness of dynamical inferences is compromised, when policy simulations are run only at point estimates of parameters, since confidence regions about those estimates are often crossed by bifurcation boundaries.

He is a Fellow of the American Statistical Association, a Charter Fellow of the Journal of Econometrics, a Charter Fellow of the Society for Economic Measurement, a Fellow of the World Innovation Foundation, a Fellow of the IC² Institute, and a Fellow of the Johns Hopkins Institute for Applied Economics, Global Health, and the Study of Business Enterprise, and honorary professor at Henan University in Kaifeng, China. He is ranked among the top 2% of the world's economists in RePEc.

His book with Nobel Laureate, Paul A. Samuelson, Inside the Economist's Mind: Conversations with Eminent Economists, Wiley-Blackwell Publishing (2007), ISBN 1-4051-5917-0, has been translated into seven languages. His MIT Press book, Getting It Wrong: How Faulty Monetary Statistics Undermine the Fed, the Financial System, and the Economy, ISBN 978-0-262-51688-4, won the American Publishers Award for Professional and Scholarly Excellence (the PROSE Awards) for the best book published in economics during 2012.

During January 2017, he was interviewed in depth about his life's work by Apostolos Serletis. A conference in his honor was held at the Bank of England on May 23–24, 2017.

== Honorary journal special issues ==
Special issues of two eminent professional journals, the Journal of Econometrics and Econometric Reviews, have been published in Professor Barnett's honor with contribution by many of the world's most prominent economists. These journals are:

- Special issue of the Journal of Econometrics on the topic of "Internally Consistent Modeling, Aggregation, Inference, and Policy," coedited in honor of William A. Barnett by James Heckman and Apostolos Serletis, v. 183, no. 1, November 2014, pp. 1 – 146.
- Special issue of Econometric Reviews on the topic of "Econometrics with Theory: A Volume Honoring William A. Barnett," coedited by James Heckman and Apostolos Serletis, v. 34, no. 1–2, 2015, pp. 1 – 254.

== Publications ==
=== Selected books ===
- Barnett, William & Apostolos Serletis (2000). The Theory of Monetary Aggregation. Elsevier. ISBN 978-0-444-50119-6.
- Barnett, William & Jane Binner (2004). Functional Structure and Approximation in Econometrics. Elsevier. ISBN 978-0-444-50861-4.
- Barnett, William & Paul Samuelson (2007). Inside the Economist's Mind: Conversations with Eminent Economists. Wiley/Blackwell. ISBN 978-1-4051-5917-3.
- Barnett, William & Marcelle Chauvet (2011). Financial Aggregation and Index Number Theory. World Scientific Publishing. ISBN 978-981-4293-09-9.
- Barnett, William (2012). Getting It Wrong: How Faulty Monetary Statistics Undermine the Fed, the Financial System, and the Economy. MIT Press. ISBN 978-0-262-51688-4.

=== Selected journal articles ===
- Barnett, William (September 1980). "Economic Monetary Aggregates: An Application of Index Number and Aggregation Theory". Journal of Econometrics. 14: 11–48. doi:10.1016/0304-4076(80)90070-6.
- Barnett, William; Paul Spindt; Edward Offenbacher (December 1984). "The New Divisia Monetary Aggregates" (PDF). Journal of Political Economy. 92 (6): 1049–1085. doi:10.1086/261275. hdl:1808/13153. S2CID 55991556.
- Barnett, William; A. R. Gallant; M. J. Hinich; J. A. Jungeilges; D. T. Kaplan; M. J. Jensen (1997). "A Single-Blind Controlled Competition among Tests for Nonlinearity and Chaos". Journal of Econometrics. 82: 157–192. CiteSeerX 10.1.1.705.4679. doi:10.1016/S0304-4076(97)00081-X.
- Barnett, William & Shu Wu (January 2005). "On User Costs of Risky Monetary Assets". Annals of Finance. 1: 35–50. doi:10.1007/s10436-004-0003-6. S2CID 17520332.
- Barnett, William (February 2007). "Multilateral Aggregation-Theoretic Monetary Aggregation over Heterogeneous Countries". Journal of Econometrics. 136 (2): 457–482. doi:10.1016/j.jeconom.2005.11.004.
