= Varna Free University =

University in Varna, Bulgaria

Coordinates: 43°15′28.2702″N 28°1′38.3448″E

Varna Free University "Chernorizets Hrabar" (VFU)
- Варненски Свободен Университет "Черноризец Храбър" (ВСУ)
- Logo of Varna Free University
- Other name: VFU
- Motto: От нас започва морето на вашите мечти
- Motto in English: "Where your dreams begin..."
- Established: 1991 by resolution of the 37th National Assembly
- President: Associate professor Krasimir Nedyalkov
- Rector: Prof. Petar Hristov
- Location: Varna, Bulgaria
- Website: www.vfu.bg

Varna Free University "Chernorizets Hrabar" (University Free of Varna) is a private university in Varna, Bulgaria, created in 1991 by resolution of the 37th National Assembly and granted the status of a higher school in 1995. It offers regular, part-time, and distance learning to its 12,000 students and maintains a campus in the town of Smolyan.

Varna Free University offers 80 undergraduate degrees, 20 master's programs, and 20 accredited PhD research courses. The university is institutionally accredited by the National Assessment and Accreditation Agency at the Council of Ministers of Bulgaria. The university is re-certified under the international standard ISO 9001:2008 and has been granted certificates from the United Kingdom Accreditation Service and the ANSI National Accreditation Board for the implementation of accepted international standards.

Varna Free University is the first and only university in Bulgaria certified with DS Label, ECTS Label, and HR by the European Executive Agency for Education and Culture at the European Commission of the European Union.

== Faculties and Departments ==
=== Faculties ===
- Faculty of International Economics and Administration Faculty
- Faculty of Law
- Faculty of Architecture

=== Departments ===
- Department of International Economics and Politics
- Department of Administration and Management
- Department of Computer Studies
- Department of Legal Sciences
- Department of Security and Safety
- Department of Psychology
- Department of Architecture and Urban Studies
- Construction of Buildings and Facilities Department
- Department of Art
