= Divisia monetary aggregates index =

Index of money supply

In econometrics and official statistics, and particularly in banking, the Divisia monetary aggregates index is an index of money supply. It uses Divisia index methods.

== Background ==
The monetary aggregates used by most central banks (notably the US Federal Reserve) are simple-sum indexes in which all monetary components are assigned the same weight:

$$M_{t}=\sum_{j=1}^{n}x_{jt},$$

in which $x_{jt}$ is one of the $n$ monetary components of the monetary aggregate $M_{t}$. The summation index implies that all monetary components contribute equally to the money total, and it views all components as dollar-for-dollar perfect substitutes. It has been argued that such an index does not weight such components in a way that properly summarizes the services of the quantities of money.

There have been many attempts at weighting monetary components within a simple-sum aggregate. An index can rigorously apply microeconomic- and aggregation-theoretic foundations in the construction of monetary aggregates. That approach to monetary aggregation was derived and advocated by William A. Barnett (1980) and has led to the construction of monetary aggregates based on Diewert's (1976) class of superlative quantity index numbers. The new aggregates are called the Divisia aggregates or Monetary Services Indexes. Salam Fayyad's 1986 PhD dissertation did early research with those aggregates using U.S. data.

This index is a discrete-time approximation with this definition:

$$\log M_{t}^{D}-\log M_{t-1}^{D}=\sum_{j=1}^{n}s_{jt}^{*}(\log x_{jt}-\log x_{j,t-1})$$

Here, the (approximate) growth rate of the aggregate is the weighted average of the growth rates of the component quantities. The discrete time Divisia weights are defined as the expenditure shares averaged over the two periods of the change

$$s_{jt}^{*}=\frac{1}{2}(s_{jt}+s_{j,t-1}),$$

for $j=1,..., n$, where

$$s_{jt}=\frac{\pi _{jt}x_{jt}}{\sum_{k=1}^{n}\pi _{kt}x_{kt}},$$

is the expenditure share of asset $j$ during period $t$, and $\pi _{jt}$ is the user cost of asset $j$, derived by Barnett (1978),

$$\pi _{jt}=\frac{R_{t}-r_{jt}}{1+R_{t}},$$

Which is the opportunity cost of holding a dollar's worth of the $j$th asset. In the last equation, $r_{jt}$ is the market yield on the $j$th asset, and $R_{t}$ is the yield available on a benchmark asset, held only to carry wealth between different time periods.

In the literature on aggregation and index number theory, the Divisia approach to monetary aggregation, $M_{t}^{D}$, is widely viewed as a viable and theoretically appropriate alternative to the simple-sum approach. See, for example, International Monetary Fund (2008), Macroeconomic Dynamics (2009), and Journal of Econometrics (2011). The simple-sum approach, $M_{t}$, which is still in use by some central banks, adds up imperfect substitutes, such as currency and non-negotiable certificates of deposit, without weights reflecting differences in their contributions to the economy's liquidity. A primary source of theory, applications, and data from the aggregation-theoretic approach to monetary aggregation is the Center for Financial Stability in New York City. More details regarding the Divisia approach to monetary aggregation are provided by Barnett, Fisher, and Serletis (1992), Barnett and Serletis (2000), and Serletis (2007). Divisia Monetary Aggregates are available for the United Kingdom by the Bank of England, for the United States by the Federal Reserve Bank of St. Louis, and for Poland by the National Bank of Poland. Divisia monetary aggregates are maintained for internal use by the European Central Bank, the Bank of Japan, the Bank of Israel, and the International Monetary Fund.

Recent empirical research has explored the potential advantages of Divisia monetary aggregates compared to the federal funds rate in monetary policy shock analysis. Keating et al. (2019) develop an econometric framework to evaluate monetary policy transmission mechanisms, conducting a systematic comparison between the federal funds rate and Divisia M4 over the period 1960–2017. Their findings suggest that Divisia M4 may provide more theoretically consistent counterfactuals across both crisis and non-crisis periods, whereas federal funds rate specifications sometimes produce empirical puzzles. The authors' model incorporating Divisia M4 appears to capture certain aspects of temporal heterogeneity in policy shock effects.
