= Presidency of Jaime Lusinchi =

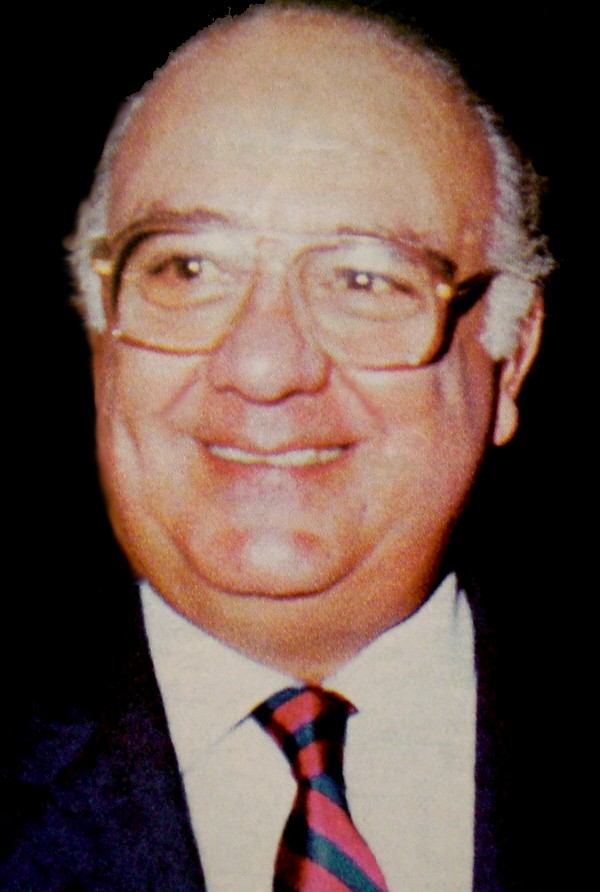
- Presidency of Jaime Lusinchi; 2 February 1984 – 2 February 1989
- Cabinet: See list
- Party: Acción Democrática
- Election: 1983
- Seat: Miraflores Palace
- Presidential Standard

The Presidency of Jaime Lusinchi or the Lusinchi Presidency or the Lusinchi Administration refers to Jaime Lusinchi’s tenure as the President of Venezuela which lasted from 2 February 1984 to 2 February 1989 as a member of the Partido Acción Democrática.

== Background ==
The adecos chose Jaime Lusinchi and Caldera once more stood up for his party COPEI. The divided socialists offered Teodoro Petkoff and José Vicente Rangel. Petkoff had broken with the Communist Party and, with the veteran leader Pompeyo Márquez, had founded in 1971 the Movement for Socialism (MAS in Spanish), which was more or less inspired by the Prague Spring, when Czech communists tried to liberalize their country in 1968.

== Inauguration ==
In his 1984 presidential inauguration speech, Jaime Lusinchi announced a period of realism and economic austerity with the aim of ending "the era of the mirages of an oil country that filled much of the 20th century". He spoke about the country's economic situation, administrative corruption, unemployment, and the need to achieve a social pact that would help stabilize the economy and reactivate production.

== Cabinet (1984–1989) ==
Ministries
OFFICE	NAME	TERM
President	Jaime Lusinchi	1984–1989
Homeland Affairs	Octavio Lepage	1984–1986
Homeland Affairs	José Ángel Ciliberto	1986–1988
Homeland Affairs	Simón Alberto Consalvi	1988–1989
Foreign Affairs	Isidro Morales Paúl	1984–1985
Foreign Affairs	Simón Alberto Consalvi	1985–1988
Foreign Affairs	Germán Nava Carrillo	1988–1989
Finance	Manuel Azpúrua Arreaza	1984–1987
Finance	Héctor Hurtado	1987–1989
Defense	Humberto Alcalde Álvarez	1984
Defense	Andrés Brito Martínez	1984–1986
Defense	José Cardozo Grimaldi	1986–1987
Defense	Heliodoro Guerrero	1987–1988
Defense	Italo del Valle Alliegro	1988–1989
Development (Public Works)	Héctor Hurtado	1984–1986
Development (Public Works)	José Ángel Ciliberto	1986
Development (Public Works)	Gustavo Mirabal Bustillos	1986–1987
Development (Public Works)	Héctor Meneses	1987–1989
Transportation and Communications	Juan Pedro del Moral	1984–1988
Transportation and Communications	Vicente Pérez Cayena	1988–1989
Education	Ruth Lerner de Almea	1984–1985
Education	Luis Manuel Carbonell	1985–1987
Education	Pedro Cabello Poleo	1987–1988
Education	Laura Castillo de Gourfinkel	1988–1989
Justice	José Manzo González	1984–1988
Justice	Pedro Torres Agudo	1988–1989
Energy (Mines and Oil)	Arturo Hernández Grisanti	1984–1988
Energy (Mines and Oil)	Julio César Gil	1988–1989
Environment	Orlando Castejón	1984
Environment	Juan Francisco Otaola Paván	1984–1986
Environment	Guillermo Colmenares Finol	1986–1989
Environment	José Arnaldo Puigbó Motales	1988–1989
Agriculture	Felipe Gómez Álvarez	1984–1988
Agriculture	Wenceslao Mantilla	1988–1989
Labor	Simón Antonio Paván	1984–1988
Labor	José Arnaldo Puigbó Morales	1988–1989
Health and Social Assistance	Luis Maniel Manzanilla	1984–1985
Health and Social Assistance	Otto Hernández Pieretti	1985–1987
Health and Social Assistance	Francisco Montbrum	1987–1989
Urban Development	Rafael Martín Guédez	1984–1986
Urban Development	César Quintana Romero	1986–1989
Youth	Milena Sardi de Selle	1984–1987
Youth	Virginia Olivo de Celli	1987–1989
Secretary of Presidency	Simón Alberto Consalvi	1984–1985
Secretary of Presidency	Carmelo Lauría Lesseur	1985–1988
Secretary of Presidency	Carlos Croes	1988–1989
Office for Coordination and Planification	Luis Raúl Matos Azócar	1984–1986
Office for Coordination and Planification	Leopoldo Carnevali	1986–1988
Office for Coordination and Planification	Modesto Freites	1988–1989
CVG	Leopoldo Sucre Figarella	1984–1989

== Domestic policy ==
=== Economics ===
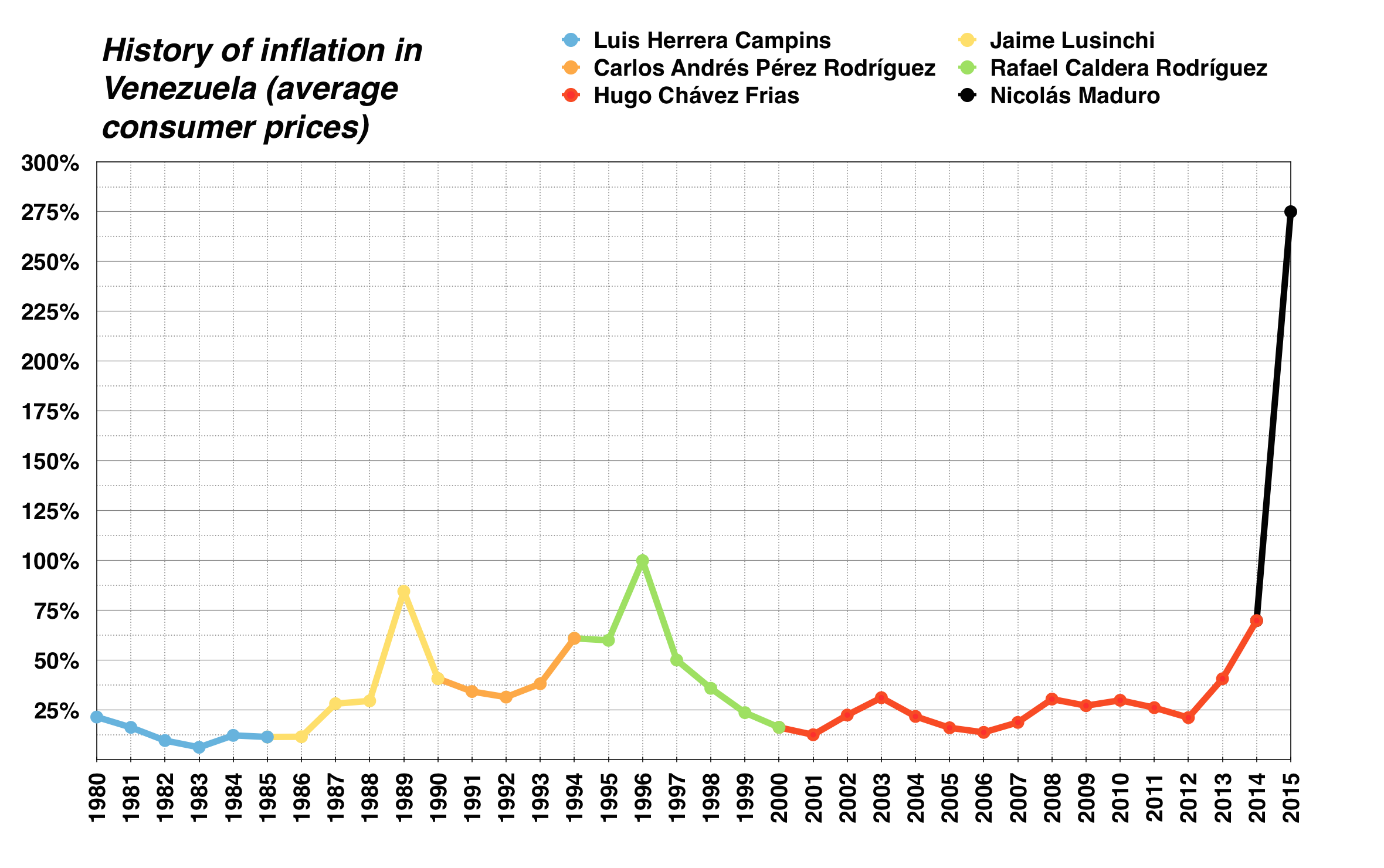
Inflation during Lusinchi's government, shown in yellow.

Following Viernes Negro on 18 February 1983, 1984 closed with an economic recession of 6% of GDP. Between that year and 1986, there were three consecutive years of depreciation of the national currency that culminated in a 93% devaluation of the bolívar at the official exchange rate in 1986. The Barcelona Centre for International Affairs described Lusinchi's economic policy as a "return to economic populism characteristic of previous Acción Democrática administrations".

=== Legislative policy ===
Composition of the Senate (1983–1988): Acción Democrática (AD) in grey.

Composition of the Chamber of Deputies (1983–1988).

=== Electoral policy ===
==== COPRE ====
The Presidential Commission for State Reform (COPRE) was a presidential commission created on 26 December 1984 by President Jaime Lusinchi to examine the reform of the Venezuelan state and its political system, the democratization of regional governmental processes, and the creation of the office of municipal mayor. Lusinchi decided to appoint all state governors from among the general secretaries of Acción Democrática at the state level, bypassing regional leadership.

=== Infrastructure ===
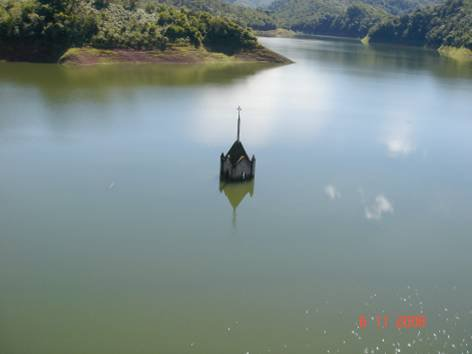
Tip of the former church of Potosí flooded by reservoir waters.

During his government, the first phase of the San Agatón Hydroelectric Plant was completed, which had been initiated by his predecessor, requiring the evacuation of the small town of Potosí, which ultimately ended up under water.

=== Media and communications policy ===
During Lusinchi's presidency there were reports of coercion against journalists. Broadcasting concessions were granted to operate new television channels, including Televen, Omnivisión and regional channels, as well as FM radio stations. Indeed, the first commercial station on that band was 107.3 MHz (today La Mega). Jaime Lusinchi decided to appoint all state governors from among the general secretaries of Acción Democrática at the state level, bypassing regional leadership.

In 1985 the two hundred copies existing in Venezuela of the book Narcotráfico S. A. by the American political activist Lyndon LaRouche were seized by the Dirección de los Servicios de Inteligencia y Prevención (DISIP).

=== Human rights ===
During Lusinchi's government there were reports of disappearances associated with the actions of some police forces. According to Revista SIC, during this time: "Allegedly officials of the former Judicial Technical Police killed more than 50 people and later threw their bodies into wells". In Zulia state, the appearance of mass graves called "Pozos de la muerte" was reported, containing bodies of people who had been detained by police or reported as missing.

Since the 1980s, various religious figures began to establish non-governmental organizations to denounce cases of police abuse, arbitrary detention, torture and extrajudicial executions. Among these were Justicia y Paz, founded by Matías Camuñas. Meanwhile, in 1985, the priest Esteban Wood of the Maryknoll missionaries, together with other activists, created the Human Rights Commission of the Maryknoll Missionaries, which later became the Red de Apoyo por la Justicia y la Paz.

In 1984, Congress attempted to approve the Law on Provisional Release for Justifying Causes. This sought to exempt officers who committed killings from responsibility, justifying them as self-defense and fulfillment of duty. In response, various academics and the NGO Comité Luto Activo organized protests arguing that it violated the right to life, preventing the project from passing.

They also denounced cases of police abuse and promoted the collection of signatures to urge Congress to repeal the Law of Vagrants and Delinquents. NGO reports drew the attention of international organizations to the human rights situation, prompting visits from members of Amnesty International, Human Rights Watch and the Inter-American Institute of Human Rights.

Amnesty International published reports investigating cases of extrajudicial executions committed by police. The organization Index on Censorship mentioned several cases of censored media outlets and that some critical journalists were imprisoned.

Since the 1980s, the first cases of HIV/AIDS began to be reported in the country. This led to discriminatory treatment in the media against the LGBTQ+ community, and at the beginning of the disease there were cases of arbitrary detention of people suspected of carrying it. In response to discrimination and high medication costs, the organization Acción Ciudadana Contra el Sida (ACCSI) was created in 1987 to provide support and pressure the government to acquire medications.

==== Tazón massacre ====
In September 1984, the Tazón massacre occurred, in which a group of about 200 students heading to Caracas for a protest were attacked by members of the Bolivarian National Guard, leaving 35 injured. The events provoked rejection and protests demanding a ban on the use of firearms to control demonstrations.

==== Massacre of El Amparo ====
On 29 October 1988, the massacre of El Amparo occurred, in which 14 fishermen were killed by police officers after being mistaken for guerrillas. The event led to a lengthy judicial process, eventually brought before the Inter-American Court of Human Rights of the Organization of American States on 14 January 1994; the Court issued a ruling on the merits on 18 January 1995 and a second ruling establishing compensation and ordering investigation and punishment on 14 September 1996.

=== Environmental policy ===
==== Toxic waste scandal ====
It was an environmental scandal that occurred in 1987, in which two ships carrying barrels of toxic waste from Italy arrived in the country. These events triggered protests, strong criticism in public opinion and Venezuelan politics at the time, leading to the creation of laws and prohibitions on the matter.

=== Corruption scandals ===
==== RECADI ====
On 24 February 1989, an investigation was opened by presidential order against RECADI for alleged financial fraud during the government of Jaime Lusinchi. RECADI constituted a turning point in the history of Venezuelan corruption and became a major scandal in 1989 when five former ministers were detained. However, charges were later dropped. Notable was the purchase of vehicles for the Acción Democrática presidential campaign of 1988, A pesar de las denuncias durante el Second presidency of Carlos Andrés Pérez el asunto no pasa a mayores debido a que los denunciantes se retractan o no presentan pruebas de los casos.

== Foreign policy ==
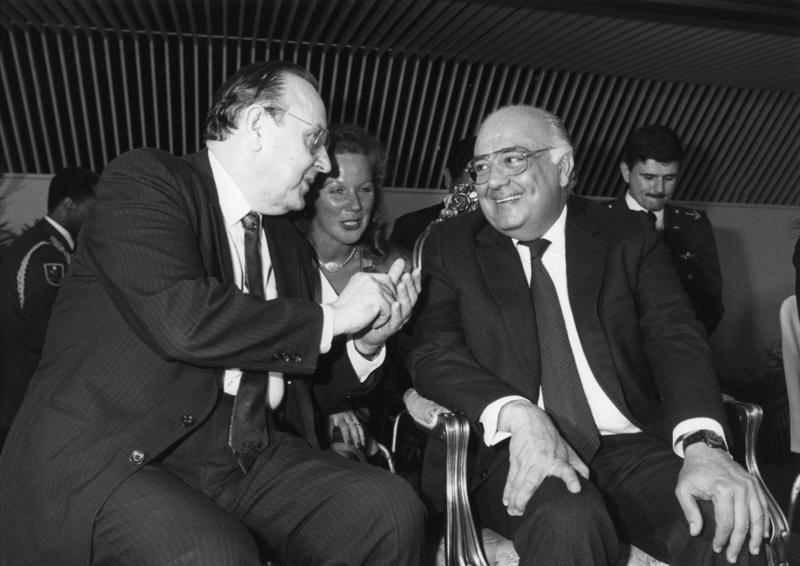
Jaime Lusinchi and West German Foreign Minister Hans-Dietrich Genscher in 1987.

In his 1984 inaugural speech, Jaime Lusinchi called for Latin American integration.

=== Colombia ===
==== Caldas corvette crisis ====
On 9 August 1987, the Caldas corvette crisis began when a Colombian warship crossed into disputed waters in the Gulf of Venezuela, placing itself in the center of the area claimed by Colombia. The conflict nearly escalated into war, but was resolved diplomatically with mediation by the Organization of American States.

=== International trips ===
The following list provides a summary of the official foreign visits made by Lusinchi as President of Venezuela:

Official visit of Jaime Lusinchi to the United States, meeting with President Ronald Reagan, 1984.

==== 1984 ====
Date	Place	Main purpose
3–5 December	Washington, D.C., San Francisco (United States)	Official visit

==== 1985 ====
Date	Place	Main purpose
25 September	(Mexico)	

==== 1986 ====
Date	Place	Main purpose
31 January	Cancún (Mexico)	Discussion on oil prices with President Miguel de la Madrid.
8 June	Rome (Italy)	Visit to the Italo-Latin American Institute.
September	(Trinidad and Tobago)	
5–7 October	Madrid (Spain)	

==== 1987 ====
Date	Place	Main purpose
17–19 July	(Barbados)	Tour and visit to four Caribbean states.
17–19 July	(Dominica)	Tour and visit to four Caribbean states.
27–30 July	Mexico City (Mexico)	Establishment of the Sponsoring Committee for the Evaluation Conferences of Venezuelan Exile in Mexico. Speech before the Permanent Commission of the Congress of the Union. Inauguration of the Simón Bolívar Chair at the National Autonomous University of Mexico.

== Opposition ==
=== Protests ===
According to El Nacional, in 1984 there were 293 protests nationwide; in 1985 there were 262, in 1986 there were 70, in 1987 there were 83, and in 1988 there were 103, totaling 811.

==== March protests in Mérida ====
On 13 March 1987, unrest began in Mérida following the killing of university student Luis Carvallo Cantor, known as the March protests in Mérida.

=== Yumare massacre ===
In 1986, the Yumare massacre occurred, in which nine members of the insurgent group Punto Cero were executed by DISIP forces. In 2006, relatives of the victims sued Lusinchi and officials for the events.

=== Night of the Tanks ===
On 26 October 1988, while Lusinchi was abroad and shortly before the elections, a column of 26 Dragón armored vehicles moved from Fuerte Tiuna toward Miraflores Palace in Caracas, later described as an aborted coup attempt.

== Aftermath ==
Corruption in Venezuela had always been a problem, but under the government of Jaime Lusinchi it became the main problem, and the majority of Venezuelans considered that corruption, and not mere incompetence, was the root of all the evils of society. This period was also characterized by allegations of immorality and abuse of power. Lusinchi had divorced his wife Gladys Castillo and had married Blanca Ibáñez, who was considered very influential behind the scenes and was blamed for abuse of power and nepotism, which reached the extreme of appointments and dismissals of public officials, financial and social conditioning of public contracts, and selection of promotions to Generals of the Armed Forces.

The disparity of the bolívar with respect to the dollar would grow, as would inflation, the Venezuelan economy stagnated, would continue to be dependent on oil, and at the end of Lusinchi's government Venezuela entered into sovereign default on the external debt contracted by the nation prior to 1983, which motivated his successor Carlos Andrés Pérez to take economic measures (El Gran Viraje) that led to a generalized social upheaval (the sadly celebrated Caracazo).

The Venezuelan economy stagnated, and the country at the end of Lusinchi's regime was reportedly bankrupt. It would be reasonable to surmise that this should have been the end of bipolarity in the next elections, but it would be wrong. In the 1988 elections, the two ruling parties got a total of 93% of the vote. Petkoff fared very badly, but abstentions went up to 18%. The winner was none other than Carlos Andrés Pérez, for his second term.

== See also ==
- Foreign relations of Venezuela
