= List of governors of the Federal District of Venezuela =

This is a partial list of governors of the Venezuelan Federal District. The constitutional reform of 1999 abolished the district government and created instead the Metropolitan District of Caracas, with jurisdiction over the territory of the District and also four adjacent municipalities (Baruta, Chacao, el Hatillo and Sucre) in Miranda.

== List of governors ==
Appointing President	Name	Party	Term
Carlos Andrés Pérez	Diego Arria Salicetti	AD	?mid-1970s
Carlos Andrés Pérez	Luis Augusto Vegas Benedetti	AD	?mid-1970s
Luis Herrera Campins	Luciano Valero	COPEI	?early 1980s
Jaime Lusinchi	Adolfo Ramírez Torres	AD	?mid-1980s
Carlos Andrés Pérez	Virgilio Ávila Vivas	AD	1989–1992
Carlos Andrés Pérez	Antonio Ledezma	AD	1992–1993
Ramón José Velásquez	César Rodríguez Berrizbeitia	AD	

== See also ==
- List of Venezuela governors
- List of Venezuelans
