= Ramón Rodríguez Chacín =

Venezuelan politician (born 1951)

Ramon Rodriguez Chacín

Governor of Guárico
- In office December 2012 – October 2017
- Preceded by: Luis Gallardo
- Succeeded by: José Manuel Vásquez

Minister of Interior and Justice
- In office January 2002 – May 2002
- Preceded by: Luis Miquilena
- Succeeded by: Diosdado Cabello

Minister of Interior and Justice
- In office January 2008 – September 2008
- Preceded by: Pedro Carreño
- Succeeded by: Tarek El Aissami

Personal details
- Born: November 9, 1951 (age 75)
- Party: PSUV

Ramón Rodríguez Chacín (born 9 November 1951) is a Venezuelan politician. A retired naval officer, he was Minister of the Interior and Justice in 2002, and again in 2008. He took part in the November 1992 coup attempt.

He is charged in the United States for drug trafficking along with Venezuelan president Nicolás Maduro and other Venezuelan officials.

== Early years ==
Rodríguez Chacín specialized in counter-insurgency and counter-intelligence tactics while serving in the military of Venezuela. He graduated from the Venezuelan Naval School in 1970.

Rodríguez Chacín was one of the founders of the Comando Específico José Antonio Páez (Cejap), an elite group of police and military forces intended to fight Revolutionary Armed Forces of Colombia (FARC) and National Liberation Army (Colombia) (ELN) guerrillas.

== 1992 coup d'état attempts ==
On November 27, 1992, Rodriguez Chacín was involved in the November 1992 attempted coup d'état (not to be confused with Hugo Chávez' February 1992 attempted coup). Rodríguez Chacín was jailed and served two years on charges of treason and rebellion.

== Hugo Chávez government ==
With the election of Hugo Chávez as president of Venezuela in 1999, Rodríguez Chacín worked as his intelligence chief.

Rodriguez Chacín was Minister of the Interior in 2002 (from January), being replaced in May 2002 by Diosdado Cabello.

In 2007 Rodríguez Chacín played a key role in organizing Operation Emmanuel, designed to fly into Colombia and receive three Colombian hostages held by the FARC in the jungles as part of a plan to push the Colombian government for a humanitarian exchange of hostages for prisoners.

According to the Los Angeles Times, the videotaped coverage of the hostage release showed minister Rodriguez Chacín telling FARC rebels "We are with you... Be strong. We are following your cause."

In January 2008 another liberation of four Colombian hostages by the FARC was managed by Rodríguez Chacín.

Rodriguez Chacín was appointed Minister of the Interior for a second time in January 2008, replacing Pedro Carreño.

Rodriguez Chacín, the Minister of Interior and Justice, stepped down on September 8, 2008: "For strictly personal grounds, I have decided to leave my job. President Hugo Chávez, our Commander-in-Chief has decided that the new interim Minister will be my colleague and comrade, Tarek El Aissami" (who is now deputy minister of citizen security).

== Allegations of links to FARC ==
The German magazine Der Spiegel reported in 2008 that Rodriguez Chacín was a frequent guest at FARC camps in Colombia and that Hugo Chávez had assigned him the task of managing communications with FARC. In September 2008, The U.S. Department of the Treasury accused Rodriguez Chacín of materially assisting FARC's narcotics trafficking activities; the Venezuelan government said he was not guilty of those charges.

US intelligence officials claimed that in an email between Rodriguez Chacín and the FARC leadership that he asked to train Venezuela's military in guerrilla tactics as preparation in case the United States invades. They also claimed that regarding an alleged 250 million dollar Venezuelan loan to buy weapons, Rodriguez Chacín wrote: "don't think of it as a loan, think of it as solidarity". The source for these documents was allegedly a 2008 cross-border raid by Colombian military into Ecuador which destroyed a FARC camp. Venezuelan Ambassador to the United States Bernardo Álvarez Herrera stated, "We don't recognized [sic] the validity of any of these documents... They are false, and an attempt to discredit the Venezuelan government."

In 2008, the U.S. Office of Foreign Assets Control (OFAC) sanctioned three current or former Venezuelan government officials, including Rodríguez, saying there was evidence they had materially helped the Revolutionary Armed Forces of Colombia (FARC) in the illegal drug trade. The order "freezes any assets the designated entities and individuals may have under U.S. jurisdiction and prohibits U.S. persons from conducting financial or commercial transactions involving those assets".

== Drug trafficking charges in the United States ==
After the 2026 United States strikes in Venezuela and capture of Nicolás Maduro by the United States. An superseding indictment charged Nicolás Maduro, Cilia Flores, Nicolás Maduro Guerra, Niño Guerrero and Rodríguez Chacín of alleged drug trafficking.
