= Luis Miquilena =

Venezuelan politician (1919–2016)

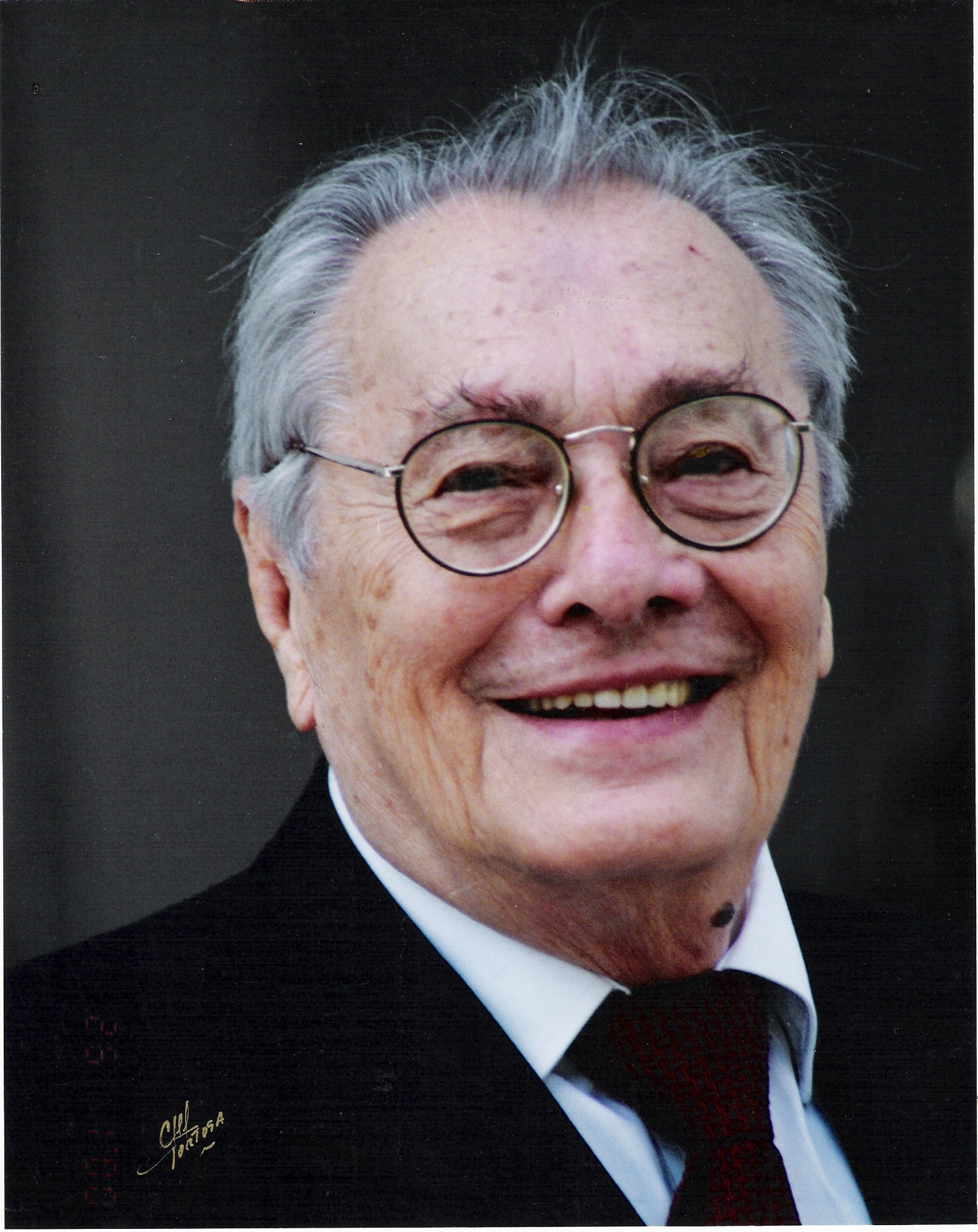

President of the Constituent Assembly
- In office 1999–2000
- President: Hugo Chávez
- Preceded by: position established
- Succeeded by: Delcy Rodríguez (2017)

Minister of Interior and Justice
- In office February 2001 – January 2002
- President: Hugo Chávez
- Preceded by: Luis Alfonso Dávila
- Succeeded by: Ramón Rodríguez Chacín

Personal details
- Born: Luis Manuel Miquilena Hernández; July 29, 1919 Santa Ana de Coro, Venezuela
- Died: November 24, 2016 (aged 97) Caracas, Venezuela
- Party: PCV, PRP, URD, MVR
- Children: Tanya Miquilena de Corrales (died March 19, 2016)
- Profession: industrialist, politician

Luis Manuel Miquilena Hernández (July 29, 1919 – November 24, 2016) was a Venezuelan politician. He was involved in politics in the 1940s, and again after the 1958 restoration of democracy, but retired from politics in 1964 until the early 1990s, pursuing a career in business. He was then an early supporter of Hugo Chávez' post-1992 political career, and was the Venezuelan Minister of Interior and Justice from 2001 to 2002, when he resigned.

== First political career ==
Miquilena began his political career with the Venezuelan Communist Party (PCV) in the 1940s as Secretary General of the Union of Bus Drivers (Spanish: Sindicato de Autobuseros), allied with President Isaías Medina Angarita. He remained with the PCV for the next four years. Later, he became a firm opponent of president Rómulo Betancourt (first presidency 1945–1948). In 1945, he broke with the PCV over their support of Betancourt and formed his own political party, the Revolutionary Party of the Proletariat (PRP). The PRP was short-lived, lasting from the overthrow of the Gallegos government (in office February 1948-November 1948) until the rise of Marcos Pérez Jiménez.

Miquilena opposed Pérez's government as well and as a result was jailed for much of the dictatorship and was initially tortured at a jail in Caracas. Later transferred to a jail in Ciudad Bolivar, Miquilena became friends with Democratic Action politician Simón Alberto Consalvi, stating that "Simon was a man that I think men should be". While imprisoned, family members would communicate cryptically by marking points on letters of books delivered to prisoners, informing Miquilena of the condition of Venezuela outside of prison. His time in prison helped him decide his views on politics. Jiménez was overthrown in 1958, and in an attempt to stabilize the fledgling democracy that succeeded the dictatorship, three Venezuelan political parties entered into the Pacto de Punto Fijo.

In 1959, Miquilena became the owner and director of the newspaper El Clarín. Over time, he progressively became a strong opponent of the government of Rómulo Betancourt (second presidency 1959–1964) over its opposition to the Cuban government under Fidel Castro and its alleged repression of leftwing political groups. However, Miquilena never agreed with guerrillas, calling them a "respectable mistake", saying "A 20 year old who decides to risk his life deserves respect. That's what made me a defender of the people who were fighting the battle against the armed forces, even though in privacy I was a fierce enemy of the guerrilla. It was a mistake that cost us a lot. If we channeled the democratic struggle from the beginning, with all the strength we had, through a rational and institutional way, who knows if the story would be different." In 1961, Miquilena joined the Democratic Republican Union (URD) party and he became a Representative for the state of Falcón in the Venezuelan Chamber of Deputies. In 1964, he left the staff of El Clarín, quit the URD, and retired from political life. For the next 30 years, he dedicated himself to business, becoming a landowner and industrialist.

He approved of the Pacto de Punto Fijo believing that Venezuela had a "history of coups and militarism" and that this was a good attempt to solve that problem, though the failure of this system led to Chávez coming to party, which he thought was worse.

== Second political career ==
All those things for which we had fought, the separation of powers, the quality of the judiciary, and so on. And corruption. All this gives way to Chávez. Chávez rides in on a crisis that was in Venezuela. And it was, at first, through a democratic discourse. Not with that gibberish that he devoted himself afterward, that 21st century socialism.

— Luis Miquilena, 2013

In the 1990s, he met Hugo Chávez and returned to the political arena as one of the founders of the Fifth Republic Movement (MVR). He initially heard about Chávez owing to Chávez's February 1992 coup attempt, and visited him in jail.

During the first years of the Chávez administration, Miquilena held important government posts: president of the Constituent Assembly (which drafted the 1999 Constitution of Venezuela), president of the National Legislative Commission, Senator (term began 1999), and Minister of Justice and the Interior (February 2001 - January 2002). In the latter post, he launched the Citizen Security Plan and promoted the Peaceful Prison Disarmament Plan.

=== Retirement ===
Disagreements with measures taken by president Chávez led to a political break. In the months before the coup against Chávez in April 2002, Miquilena talked with Fidel Castro and the two agreed that they did not want Venezuela to take the same path as Cuba. Chávez also convinced Miquilena that he was not going to follow a Cuban model, but later took back his word. When Miquilena realized that Chávez was taking a similar path as the Cuban government and Chávez was centralizing power around himself, he decided to retire. He met with Castro and Chávez on Margarita Island, looking to Castro for assistance with Chávez, however "Fidel had discovered the immense vanity of Chavez, and took advantage of it to get the slice of the century. Thereafter he devoted himself, in a roguish way, to take advantage of Chávez, regardless of what happened in Venezuela".

In an interview a month after the failed coup against Chávez in April 2002, Miquilena rejected the view that the people had restored Chávez to power. Miquilena declared that it was the incompetence of one of the coup leaders, Pedro Carmona, who had served as president for 36 hours, which restored Chávez to power "by his decree to dissolve the Assembly and by ousting all mayors". In 2007, Miquilena voiced his disagreement with the proposal for constitutional reform.

== Later life and death ==
In 2013, at the start of the crisis in Venezuela, Miquilena was interviewed by the Venezuelan news website Runrunes. He stated that he did not feel guilty about helping Chávez gain power but stated that he felt "very sorry" for not being able to fight against the effects of Chávez during the end of his life. When asked how he would fight back against the Bolivarian government, he said that he would be "in the front line, uniting and gathering people to face the disaster we are suffering" and that "the popular struggle is not armed. It is the struggle of the people on the street. In every line of people to buy flour bread and toilet paper should be someone shaking up the people".

Three years later, Miquilena died in Caracas on November 24, 2016, and the interview, one of his last, was released to the public.

== Popular culture ==
Miquilena is featured in the Miguel Otero Silva's La Muerte de Honorio, a novel about the anti-Pérez Jiménez resistance movement.

== See also ==
- Political prisoners in Venezuela
- Torture in Venezuela

== Notes ==
Political offices
Preceded by Luis Alfonso Dávila	Venezuelan Minister of Interior and Justice; 2001–2002	Succeeded by Ramon Rodriguez Chacin
