= Carmelo Lauría Lesseur =

Venezuelan politician

President of the Chamber of Deputies of the Congress of Venezuela
- In office 1994–1996
- Preceded by: Luis Enrique Oberto
- Succeeded by: Ramón Guillermo Aveledo

Minister of Home Affairs of Venezuela
- In office 1992–1992
- President: Carlos Andrés Pérez
- Succeeded by: Luis Piñerúa Ordaz

Secretary of the Presidency of Venezuela
- In office 1985–1988
- President: Jaime Lusinchi
- Preceded by: Simón Alberto Consalvi

Personal details
- Born: 24 August 1936
- Died: 29 November 2010 (aged 74)
- Profession: businessman, politician

Carmelo Antonio Lauría Lesseur (24 August 1936 – 29 November 2010) was a Venezuelan businessman, lawyer and politician.

== Career ==
He served in several ministerial positions for Carlos Andrés Pérez, and was Secretary of the Presidency for Jaime Lusinchi from 1985 to 1988, and Governor of the Federal District (1984–85). He also served as President of the Venezuelan Chamber of Deputies from 1994 to 1996. Among other business positions he was Director of Banco Central de Venezuela and President of Banco de Venezuela, and a board member of SIDOR.

Lauría was said to be one of the "Twelve Apostles", a group of Venezuelan businessmen close to President Carlos Andrés Pérez during his first term, Lauria served briefly as Minister for Development in 1974, during the First Presidency of Carlos Andrés Pérez. He was also briefly Interior Minister in 1992 during the Second Presidency of Carlos Andrés Pérez. He obtained a law degree and a doctorate in law from the Andrés Bello Catholic University, and taught there and at the Central University of Venezuela.
