= Adolfo Ramírez Torres =

Venezuelan politician

Governor of the Federal District of Venezuela

Adolfo Ramírez Torres is a Venezuelan politician. He was appointed Governor of the Federal District of Venezuela by President Jaime Lusinchi in the early 1980s and was later Deputy Interior Minister. In June 1991 he was arrested on charges of drug trafficking, and in 1998 he was convicted and sentenced to ten years in prison.

On June 6, 2000, the Thirty-First Court of First Instance of the Criminal Judicial Circuit of the Metropolitan area of Caracas, acting as Control, decreed the dismissal of the case.
