= Luciano Valero =

Venezuelan politician

Minister of Internal Affairs of Venezuela
- In office 1982–1984
- President: Luis Herrera Campins
- Preceded by: Rafael Montes de Oca
- Succeeded by: Octavio Lepage

Personal details
- Profession: Politician

Luciano Valero is a Venezuelan politician. He was the appointed Governor of Barinas from 1959 to 1964, and again from 1969 to 1973. He was appointed Governor of the Federal District of Venezuela by President Luis Herrera Campins in the early 1980s. He also served in the cabinet of Luis Herrera Campins, as Minister of Agriculture (1979–1981) and Minister of Internal Affairs (1982–1984).

== See also ==
- List of ministers of interior of Venezuela
