= List of ministers of interior of Venezuela =

Following is a list of ministers of interior and justice of Venezuela.

== List ==
- Andrés Narvarte (1832 – 1835)
- Francisco González Guinán (1887 – 1888)
- Juan Francisco Castillo (1899 – 1900)
- Rafael Cabrera Malo (1900 – 1901)
- José Antonio Velutini (1901 – 1902)
- Rafael López Baralt (1902 –1903)
- Leopoldo Baptista (1903 – 1907)
- Julio Torres Cárdenas (1907)
- Rafael López Baralt (1907 -1908)
- Rubén González Cárdenas (1929 – 1931)
- Pedro Tinoco Smith (1931 – 1936)
- Diógenes Escalante (1936)
- Alejandro Lara (1936)
- Régulo Olivares (1936 – 1937)
- Alfonso Mejía (1937 – 1938)
- Luis Gerónimo Pietri (1938–1941)
- Valmore Rodríguez (1945 – 1946)
- Mario Ricardo Vargas (1946 – 1948)
- Luis Felipe Urbaneja Blanco (1952 – 1958)
- Luis Augusto Dubuc (1959 – 1962)
- Carlos Andrés Pérez (1962 – 1963)
- Manuel Mantilla (1963 – 1964)
- Gonzalo Barrios (1964 – 1966)
- Reinaldo Leandro Mora (1966 – 1969)
- Lorenzo Fernández (1969 – 1972)
- Nectario Andrade Labarca (1972 – 1974)
- Luis Piñerúa Ordaz (1974 – 1975)
- Octavio Lepage (1975 – 1978)
- Manuel Mantilla (1978 – 1979)
- Rafael Montes de Oca (1979 – 1982)
- Luciano Valero (1982 – 1984)
- Octavio Lepage (1984 – 1986)
- José Ángel Ciliberto (1986 – 1988)
- Simón Alberto Consalvi (1988 – 1989)
- Alejandro Izaguirre (1989 – 1992)
- Virgilio Ávila Vivas (1992)
- Carmelo Lauría Lesseur (1992)
- Luis Piñerúa Ordaz (1992 – 1993)
- Jesús Ramón Carmona (1993)
- Ramón Escovar Salom (1994 – 1996)
- José Guillermo Andueza (1996 – 1998)
- Asdrúbal Aguiar (1998 – 1999)
- Ignacio Arcaya (February 1999 – 2000)
- Luis Alfonso Dávila (2000 – February 2001)
- Luis Miquilena (February 2001 – January 2002)
- Ramón Rodríguez Chacín (January 2002 – May 2002)
- Diosdado Cabello (May 2002 – January 2003)
- Lucas Rincón Romero (January 2003 – September 2004)
- Jesse Chacón (September 2004 – January 2007)
- Pedro Carreño (January 2007 – January 2008)
- Ramón Rodríguez Chacín (January 2008 – September 2008)
- Tarek El Aissami (September 2008 – October 2012)
- Néstor Luis Reverol Torres (October 2012 – April 2013)
- Miguel Rodríguez Torres (April 2013 – October 2014)
- Carmen Meléndez (October 2014 – March 2015)
- Gustavo González López (10 March 2015 – 3 August 2016)
- Néstor Luis Reverol Torres (3 August 2016 – 25 October 2020)
- Carmen Meléndez (25 October 2020 – 19 August 2021)
- Remigio Ceballos (19 August 2021 – 27 August 2024)
- Diosdado Cabello (27 August 2024 - 10 January 2025)
- Diosdado Cabello (10 January 2025 - 3 January 2026)

== See also ==
- List of ministers of foreign affairs of Venezuela
