= Luis Piñerúa Ordaz =

Venezuelan politician

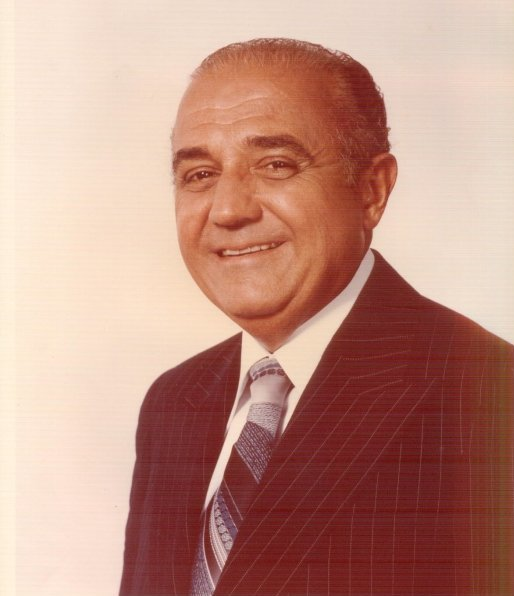

Minister of Home Affairs of Venezuela
- In office 1992–1992
- President: Carlos Andrés Pérez
- Preceded by: Carmelo Lauría Lesseur

Minister of Home Affairs of Venezuela
- In office 1974–1975
- President: Carlos Andrés Pérez
- Succeeded by: Octavio Lepage

Governor of Monagas
- In office 1960–1961
- President: Rómulo Betancourt

Personal details
- Born: 20 April 1924; Güiria, Venezuela
- Died: 8 February 2001 (aged 76); Caracas, Venezuela
- Profession: politician
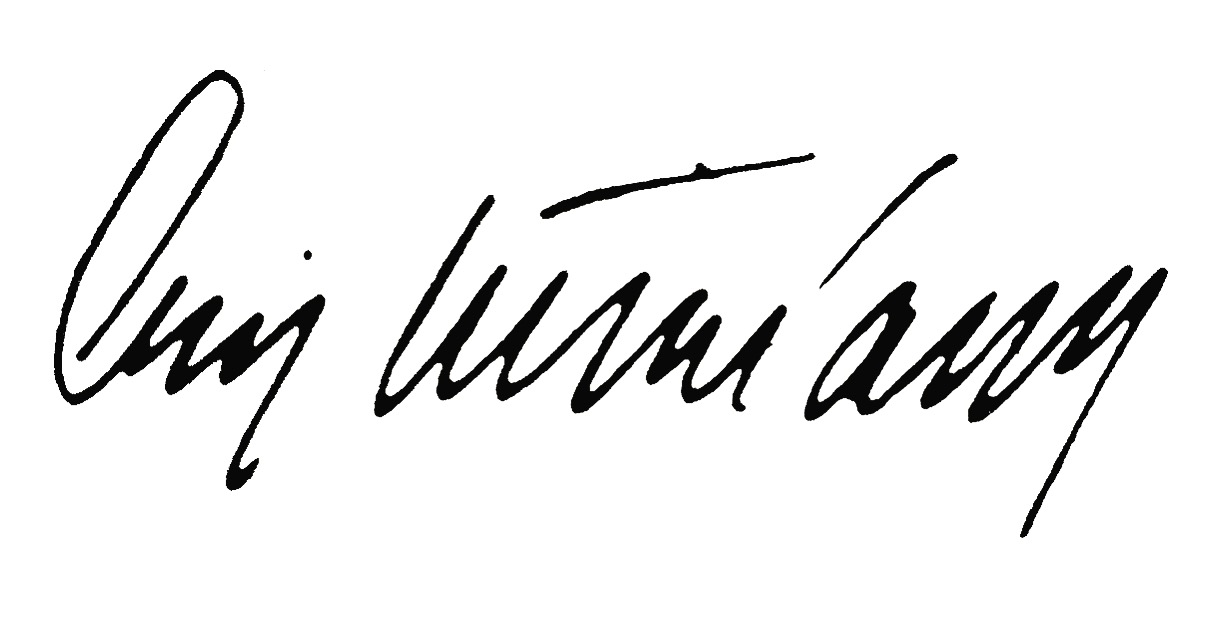
- Signature

Luis María Piñerúa Ordaz (20 April 1924 - 8 February 2001) was the Democratic Action presidential candidate in the 1978 Venezuelan general election, losing to COPEI's Luis Herrera Campins. He held the post of Minister of Home Affairs of Venezuela in both the first presidency and second presidency of Carlos Andrés Pérez.

== See also ==
- Political prisoners in Venezuela

Party political offices
Preceded by Carlos Andrés Pérez	AD presidential candidate 1978 (lost)	Succeeded by Jaime Lusinchi
