= Twelve Apostles (Venezuela) =

The "Twelve Apostles" (Los Doce Apóstoles) were a group of Venezuelan businessmen close to President Carlos Andrés Pérez. The term was coined by Pedro Duno (1975) and became part of the Venezuelan political language. The group included Pedro Tinoco and Carmelo Lauria Lesseur. Of the various family groups involved, the Cisneros Group of Gustavo Cisneros was the most successful by the 1990s.

The links between Pérez and the apostles go back to Pérez' struggle for the Democratic Action presidential candidacy in 1973. Lacking a power base in the party, Pérez allied himself with businessmen outside it. After he attained the presidency, the names of these businessmen appeared on "many of the financially most lucrative contracts awarded in the period 1974-78, including the Guri Dam, Cementos Caribe (the licensing of a new cement factory), the new Zulia steel mill, the Pentacom petrochemical project, and the construction of Parque Central (the largest shopping mall/office complex in South America at the time), among many others"

== Books ==
- Duno, Pedro. 1975. Los Doce Apóstoles: Proceso a la Degradación Política. Valencia: Vadell Hermanos Editores.
- Tarver Denova, Hollis Micheal. 2004. The Rise and Fall of Venezuelan President Carlos Andrés Pérez: An Historical Examination, Volume II: The Later Years, 1973-2004. Lewiston, NY: Edwin Mellen. ISBN 0-7734-6246-5
