= Mirtha Rivero =

Venezuelan journalist and writer

- Born: 1956 (age 69–70); Caracas, Venezuela
- Occupations: Journalist, writer

Mirtha Rivero (born 1956) is a Venezuelan journalist and writer.

== Career ==
Mirtha Rivero started her career in the press in La Región, of Los Teques. She was editor, reporter and information chief for the economics section of El Diario de Caracas. She served as editor-in-chief of the Dinero magazine and later focused to the corporative field. Rivero also wrote urban chronicles for the Estampas magazine of El Universal, and has written for the magazines Contrabando, of Caracas, and Emeequis, of Mexico City.

In 2010 she published the book La rebelión de los náufragos (The Castaways Rebellion) about the second tenure of Venezuelan President Carlos Andrés Pérez and both the events and processes that led to his removal.

As of 2014 she collaborated with Interfolia, a publication of the Alfonsine Chapel of the Autonomous University of Nuevo León, México.

== Works ==
- La rebelión de los náufragos (2010)
