= Simón Alberto Consalvi =

Venezuelan politician, journalist and diplomat

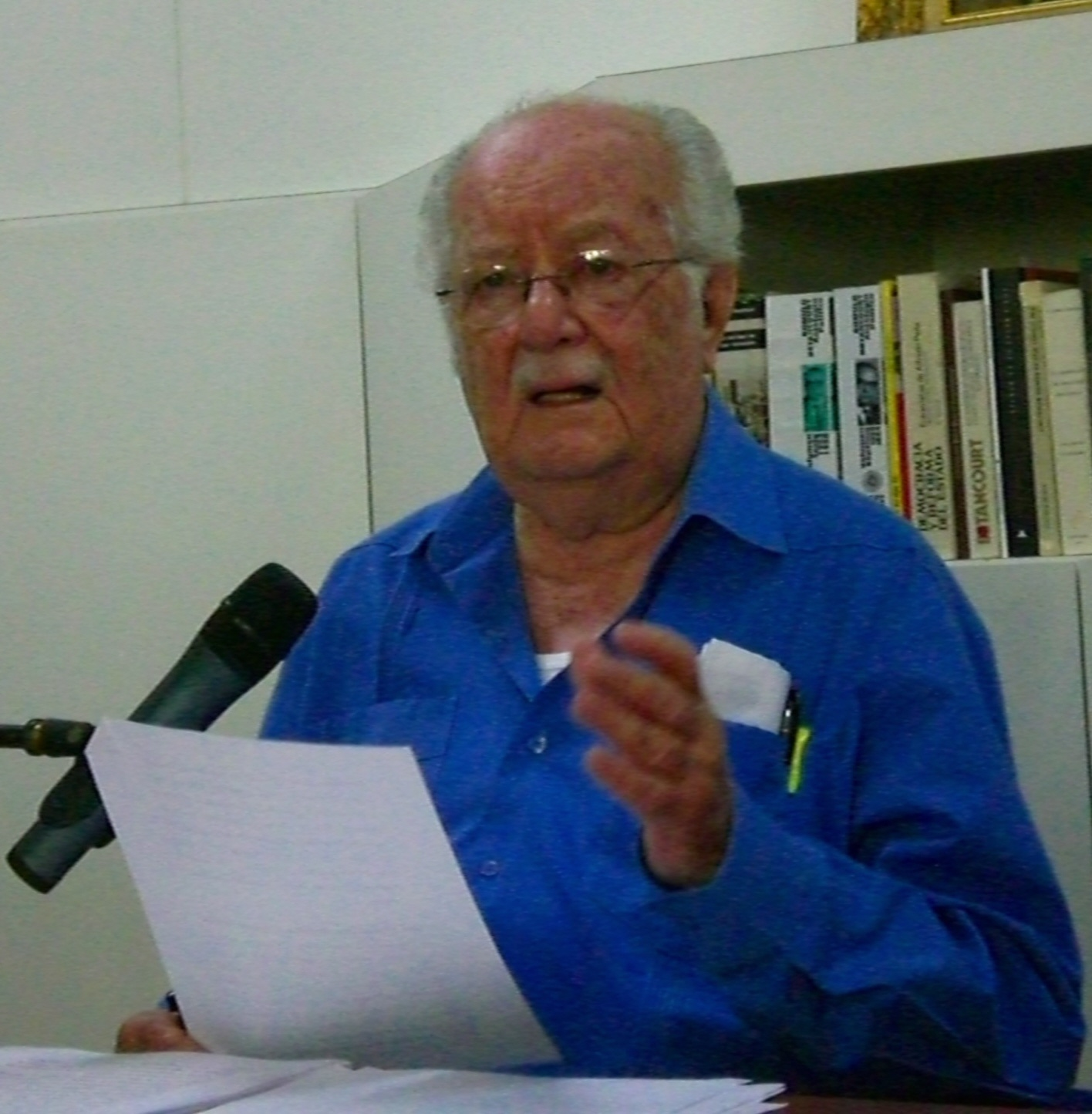

Minister of Internal Affairs of Venezuela
- In office 1988–1989
- President: Jaime Lusinchi
- Preceded by: José Ángel Ciliberto
- Succeeded by: Alejandro Izaguirre

Minister of Foreign Affairs of Venezuela
- In office 15 July 1977 – 12 March 1979
- President: Carlos Andrés Pérez
- In office 13 March 1985 – 11 January 1988
- President: Jaime Lusinchi

Secretary of the Presidency of Venezuela
- In office 1984–1985
- President: Jaime Lusinchi
- Succeeded by: Carmelo Lauría Lesseur

Personal details
- Born: 7 July 1927 Santa Cruz de Mora, Venezuela
- Died: 11 March 2013 (aged 85) Caracas, Venezuela
- Spouse: Josefina Carrero María Eugenia Bigott Tibisay Cerrada
- Profession: politician, diplomat, historian, journalist
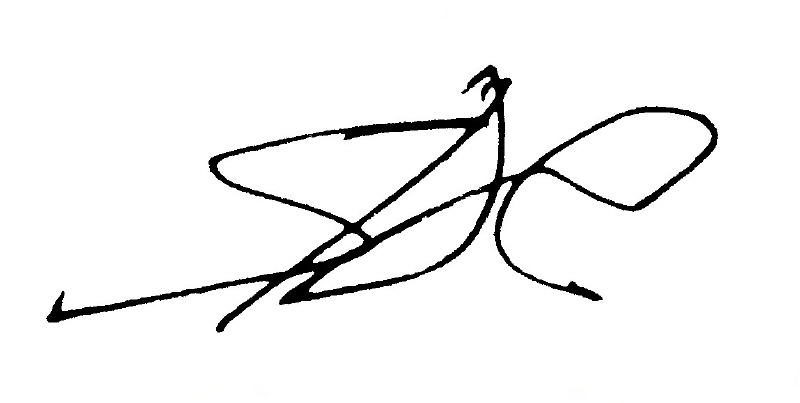
- Signature

Simón Alberto Consalvi (7 July 1927 – 11 March 2013) was a Venezuelan politician, journalist, diplomat and historian.

== Career ==
He was Minister of Foreign Affairs of Venezuela on two occasions (1977-1979/1985-1988), Minister of Internal Affairs of Venezuela (1988–1989), Secretary of the Presidency (1988), and also held several Ambassadorships. A journalist and author of many books, he was member of the National Academy of History since 1997, and Associate Editor of the daily El Nacional.

Because of a domestic accident, Simon Alberto Consalvi died in Caracas, Venezuela on 11 March 2013 He was 85.

== Partial bibliography ==
- " Cuba: patria del exilio Venezolano y trinchera combatientes" (1982)
- "La Paz Nuclear" (1988)
- "1989 / Diario de Washington" (1990)
- "Pedro Manuel Arcaya y la crisis de los años 30" (1991)
- "Auge y caída de Rómulo Gallegos" (1991)
- "Lascivia Brevis" (1992)
- "Grover Cleveland y la controversia Venezuela-Gran Bretaña" (1992)
- "Los Gómez de Zapata" (1993)
- "Profecía de la palabra" (1996)
- "El perfil y la sombra" (1997)
- "Las relaciones Venezuela-Estados Unidos en la primera mitad del siglo XX" (2000)
- "Profecía de la palabra, Vida y Obra de Mariano Picón Salas" (2001)
- "El Precio de la Historia" (2001)
- "Historia de las relaciones exteriores de Venezuela, 1810–2000" (2001)
- "Reflexiones sobre la Historia de Venezuela" (2002)
- "Augusto Mijares, el pensador y su tiempo" (2003)
- "El carrusel de las discordias" (2003)
- "El petróleo en Venezuela" (2004)
- "1957: el año en que los venezolanos perdieron el miedo" (2007)
- "La Guerra de los Compadres" (2009)
- "La Revolución de Octubre" (2010)

== See also ==
- El Nacional
- Monte Ávila Editores
- List of Venezuelan writers
- List of ministers of foreign affairs of Venezuela
- Political prisoners in Venezuela

Political offices
Preceded by Ramón Escovar Salom	169th Minister of Foreign Affairs of Venezuela; 15 July 1977 – 12 March 1979	Succeeded by José Alberto Zambrano Velasco
Preceded by Isidro Morales Paúl	172nd Minister of Foreign Affairs of Venezuela; 13 March 1985 – 11 January 1988	Succeeded by Germán Nava Carrillo
