= Pedro París Montesinos =

Venezuelan politician

Pedro París Montesinos is a Venezuelan politician who was president of the National Congress on two occasions with the Democratic Action party.

== Biography ==
After the removal of President Carlos Andrés Pérez in 1993, he voted in favor of his expulsion from Democratic Action, and was part of one of the Democratic Action factions that called for the resignation of general secretary Luis Alfaro Ucero and Lewis Pérez.
