= Gonzalo Barrios (politician) =

Venezuelan politician

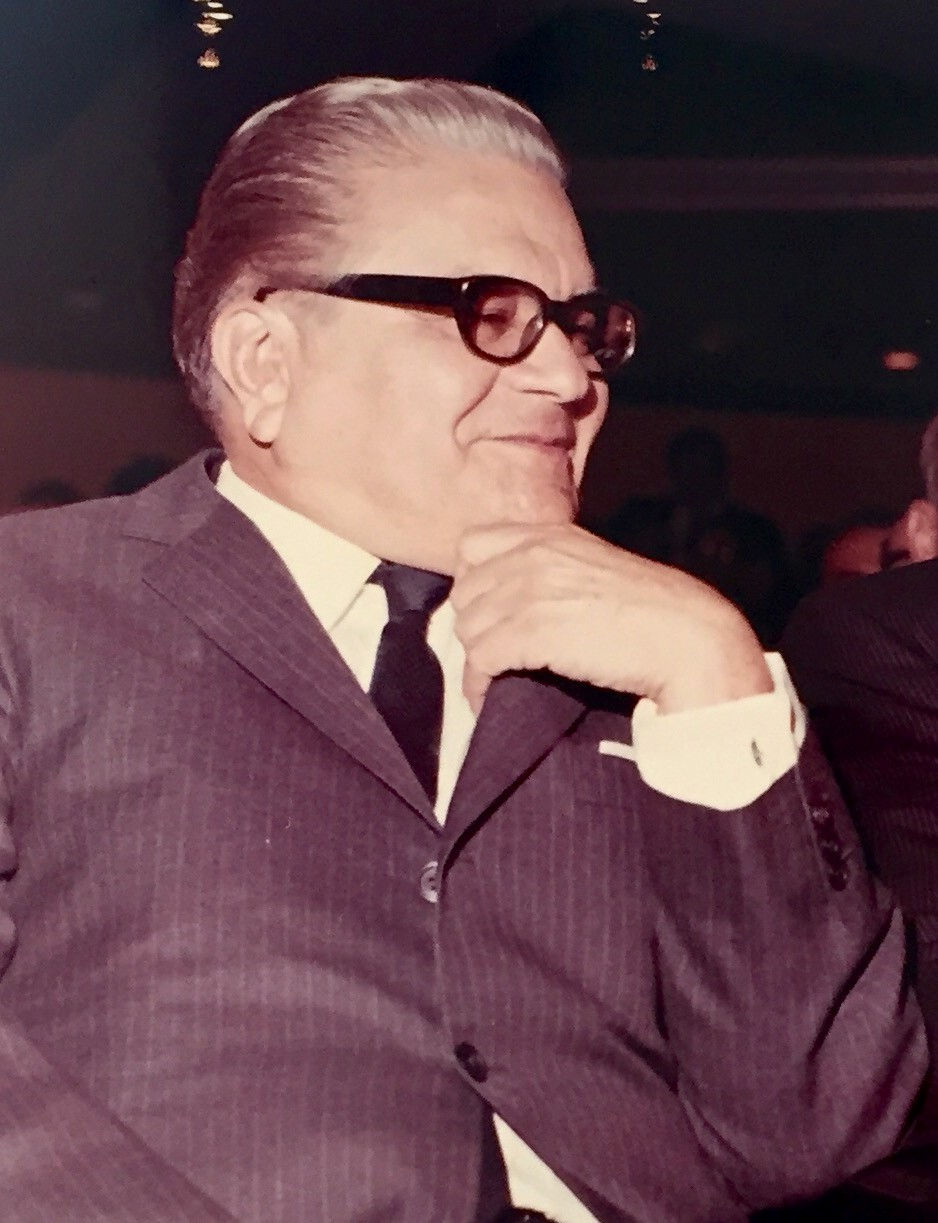

President of the Senate of Venezuela
- In office 1974–1979
- Preceded by: José Antonio Pérez Díaz
- Succeeded by: Godofredo González

Minister of Foreign Affairs
- In office November 1947 – February 1948
- President: Rómulo Betancourt
- Succeeded by: Andrés Eloy Blanco

Minister of Internal Affairs
- In office 1964–1966
- President: Raúl Leoni
- Preceded by: Manuel Mantilla

Personal details
- Born: 10 January 1902 Acarigua, Venezuela
- Died: 30 May 1993 (aged 91) Caracas, Venezuela
- Party: Acción Democrática
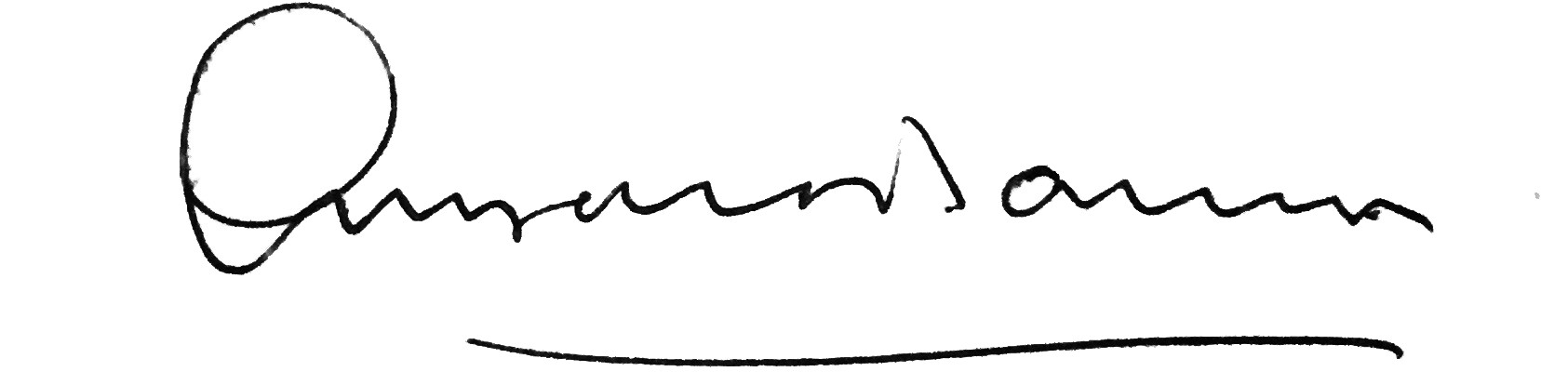
- Signature

Gonzalo Barrios Bustillos (10 January 1902 – 30 May 1993) was a Venezuelan politician. He was a founding member of the political party Acción Democrática (AD) and Minister of Foreign Affairs during the Trienio Adeco (1945–48). Later he signed the Puntofijo Pact on behalf of AD and served as Minister of Interior and Justice under Raúl Leoni (1964–1966).

He was AD's presidential candidate in the 1968 Venezuelan presidential election, and later President of the Venezuelan Senate from 1974 to 1979. He was elected Secretary General of AD in 1966.

== See also ==
- List of ministers of foreign affairs of Venezuela

Party political offices
Preceded by Raúl Leoni (1963)	AD presidential candidate 1968 (lost)	Succeeded by Carlos Andrés Pérez (1973)
Preceded by Carlos Morales	153rd Minister of Foreign Affairs of Venezuela; November 1947 – February 1948	Succeeded by Andrés Eloy Blanco
