= Manuel Mantilla =

Manuel Mantilla may refer to:

- Manuel Mantilla (boxer) (born 1973), Cuban Olympic boxer
- Manuel Mantilla (politician), (fl. 1960s/1970s), Venezuelan politician
- Manuel Florencio Mantilla (1853–1909), Argentine writer and politician, namesake of the PNA Doctor Manuel Mantilla, an Argentine Naval Prefecture patrol boat
