= Blanca Ibáñez =

Venezuelan first lady

- Born: August 17, 1947 (age 78); San Cristóbal, Venezuela
- Citizenship: Venezuela (birthplace), Costa Rica (naturalized)
- Occupation: Administrative
- Spouse: Jaime Lusinchi (m. 1991; died 2014)

Blanca Alida Ibáñez Piña (born August 17, 1947) is a Venezuelan private secretary and widow of former President Jaime Lusinchi. She is the daughter of María del Rosario Piña and Carlos Julio Ibáñez.

== Biography ==
At a very young age, Ibáñez moved with her mother to Caracas, where she performed different jobs and prepared to be a secretary, which eventually allowed her to get a job in the Chamber of Deputies of the National Congress. She worked for the parliamentary faction of the Acción Democrática party, whose parliamentary leader at the time was deputy Jaime Lusinchi, who was later elected President of the Republic for the 1984-89 period.

When the government of Jaime Lusinchi started in February 1984, she was appointed "private secretary" of the Presidency. This designation sparked many reactions in public opinion. Many of her critics said that Ibáñez had a high degree of discretional power inside the government.

After the end of the Lusinchi presidency, she moved to the United States and married him in New York City on September 11, 1991. There, she founded and directed the magazine Mujeres en Acción (English: "Women in Action") for the denouncement of sexual abuse against women, and also ran the CELAC Foundation, created by former president Lusinchi.

In 1998, she was tried for a corruption case in the Lusinchi term. The Supreme Court of Justice of Venezuela later acquitted her. Other politicians involved in the case included José Ángel Ciliberto and Jorge Mogna Salazar.

As of 2017 she lived in Costa Rica, where she obtained Costa Rican citizenship. Ibáñez has represented the International Society for Human Rights, which is based in Frankfurt, Germany.
