= Pedro Carreño =

Venezuelan politician and lawyer

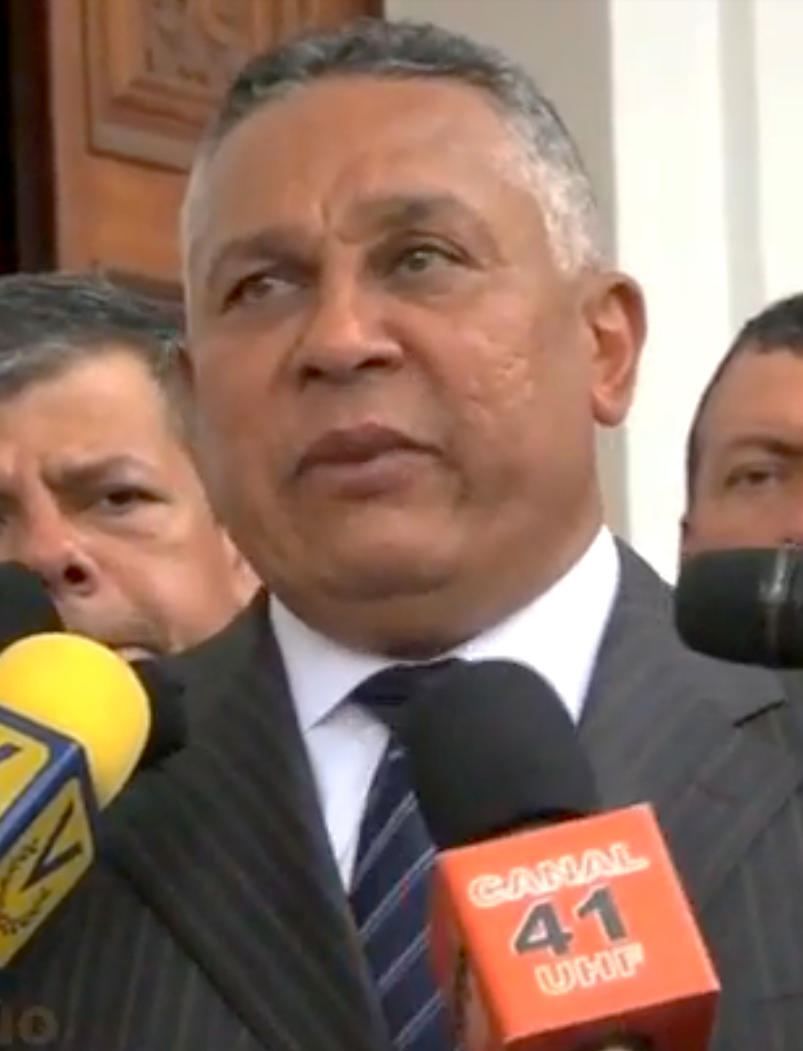

Member of the Constituent National Assembly
- In office 30 July 2017 – 18 december 2020

Deputy of the Venezuelan National Assembly, Delta Amacuro
- In office 5 January 2016 – 30 July 2017

Head of the PSUV Bank in the Venezuelan National Assembly
- In office 16 December 2012 – 5 January 2016
- Preceded by: Aristóbulo Istúriz
- Succeeded by: Héctor Rodríguez Castro

Deputy of the Venezuelan National Assembly, Lara
- In office 5 January 2011 – 5 January 2016

Personal details
- Born: April 24, 1961 (age 65) Mantecal, Apure, Venezuela
- Party: Fifth Republic Movement (MVR) (until 2008); United Socialist Party of Venezuela (PSUV) (from 2008)
- Education: Central University of Venezuela; Andres Bello Catholic University

Military service
- Allegiance: Venezuela
- Branch/service: Venezuelan Army
- Years of service: 1981-1993
- Rank: Captain

Pedro Miguel Carreño Escobar is a Venezuelan politician and lawyer. Carreño has served multiple roles within the Bolivarian Government of Venezuela during the presidencies of Hugo Chávez and Nicolás Maduro.

== Career ==
=== Military career ===
Carreño began his military career in 1981 when he began his studies at the Venezuelan Academy of Military Sciences, where he graduated in 1985. In 1993, he was discharged from the Venezuelan Army by Lieutenant Colonel Enrique Medina Gómez following allegations of "aggravated fraud" in regards to his duties managing the funds of his military unit, preventing Carreño from legally being involved in public office in Venezuela in the future. The Bolivarian government maintains that Carreño was discharged from the army in February 1994 for "military rebellion".

=== Political career ===
Following his disciplinary discharge from the army, Carreño began studies in the advertising industry through the Central University of Venezuela. He later received a master's degree in History of Venezuela from Andres Bello Catholic University.

Carreño's political career began during the presidential campaign of Hugo Chávez during the 1998 Venezuelan presidential election where he served as a personal assistant. Following Chavez's election, he then served as Sectoral General Director of Presidential Relations until the 2000 Venezuelan general election.

==== National Assembly ====
From 2000 to 2010, Carreño was a deputy of the Venezuelan National Assembly for Barinas, being reelected in 2005. While in the National Assembly, he was tasked with numerous comptroller and financial positions. During the reformation of the Supreme Tribunal of Justice of Venezuela, Carreño and other deputies of the chavista-led National Assembly packed the court with loyalists, with Carreño stating that "in the list of potential candidates there is no one who will stand against us".

As a member of the United Socialist Party of Venezuela (PSUV), he was a coordinator and Bolivarian propaganda director in several Venezuelan states.

Following his tenure as a representative for Barinas, Carreño also served as a deputy in the National Assembly for the states of Lara and Delta Amacuro.

==== National Constituent Assembly ====
Carreño was elected into the Constituent National Assembly following the 2017 Venezuelan Constituent Assembly election on 30 July 2017.

== Controversy ==
=== Military action in Colombia ===
In July 2018, Carreño suggested retaliatory attacks on Colombia if the United States were to become involved in Venezuelan affairs, explaining plans to attack key infrastructure sites within Colombia. On 12 August 2018, former Foreign Minister of Venezuela, Roy Chaderton, stated that Venezuelans are "more civilized" than Colombians and that he was "part of the Pedro Carreño command" of the Bolivarian government, believing that Venezuelan troops must conquer Colombia and "reach the Pacific, because at last and finally we liberate the countries whose coasts are bathed by the Pacific Ocean ... I believe that we ... have military superiority".

The Lima Group expressed "deep concern" about Venezuela's militarized stance towards Colombia during the period and further criticized Venezuela's human rights record.

=== Sanctions ===
Canada sanctioned 40 Venezuelan officials, including Carreňo, in September 2017. The sanctions were for behaviors that undermined democracy after at least 125 people will killed in the 2017 Venezuelan protests and "in response to the government of Venezuela's deepening descent into dictatorship"; Chrystia Freeland, Foreign Minister said, "Canada will not stand by silently as the government of Venezuela robs its people of their fundamental democratic rights". The Canadian regulations of the Special Economic Measures Act prohibited any "person in Canada and any Canadian outside Canada from: dealing in property, wherever situated, that is owned, held or controlled by listed persons or a person acting on behalf of a listed person; entering into or facilitating any transaction related to a dealing prohibited by these Regulations; providing any financial or related services in respect of a dealing prohibited by these Regulations; making available any goods, wherever situated, to a listed person or a person acting on behalf of a listed person; and providing any financial or other related services to or for the benefit of a listed person."

=== Wealth ===
Despite his socialist rhetoric, Carreño has been criticized about his wealth after publicly wearing various items from luxury brands like Balenciaga, Gucci and Louis Vuitton. Carreño also resides within a mansion overlooking Venezuela's capital city, Caracas.

While criticizing capitalism during a speech in December 2007, a reporter stated to Carreño that it was a hypocritical for him to be critical while wearing Gucci and Louis Vuitton, leaving Carreño for a loss of words. During the crisis in Bolivarian Venezuela when the majority of Venezuelans suffered from poverty and shortages, he was again criticized for wearing expensive Balenciaga shoes while exercising in his private gym.
