= Luis Herrera Campins =

President of Venezuela from 1979 to 1984

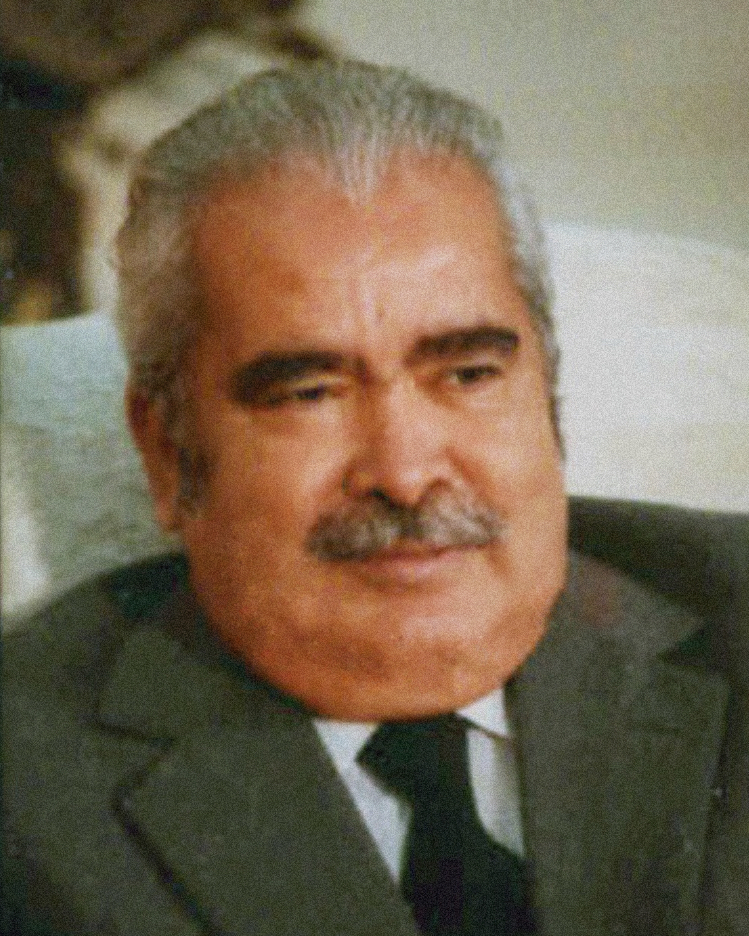
- Official portrait, 1983

48th President of Venezuela
- In office 12 March 1979 – 2 February 1984
- Preceded by: Carlos Andrés Pérez
- Succeeded by: Jaime Lusinchi

Senator for life
- In office 2 February 1984 – 30 March 2000

Personal details
- Born: Luis Antonio Herrera Campins; 4 May 1925 Acarigua, Portuguesa, Venezuela
- Died: 9 November 2007 (aged 82) Caracas, Venezuela
- Party: Copei (1946-2007)
- Spouse: Betty Urdaneta
- Children: Luis Fernando Herrera; María Luisa Herrera; José Gregorio Herrera; Juan Luis Herrera; María Beatriz Herrera
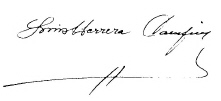
- Signature

Luis Antonio Herrera Campins (4 May 1925 – 9 November 2007) was a Venezulean politician who served as the 48th President of Venezuela from 1979 to 1984, as a member of Copei. Prior to his presidency he was a member of the Congress of Venezuela. He was imprisoned and exiled during the presidency of Marcos Pérez Jiménez.

== Early life and career ==
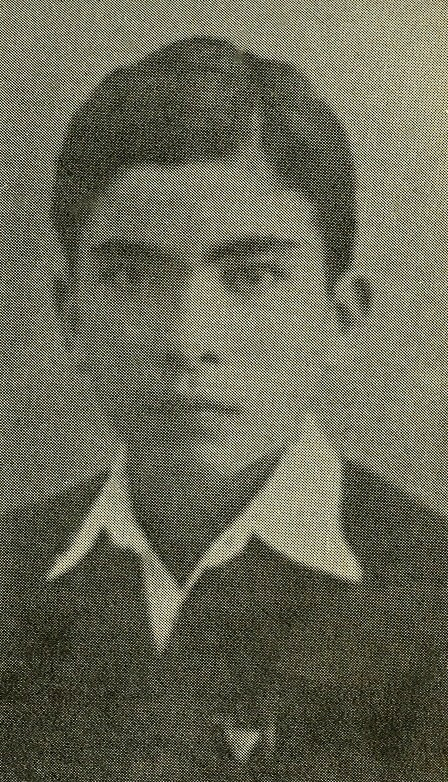
Luis Herrera at the age of 15

Luis Herrera Campins was born in Acarigua, Venezuela, on 4 May 1925. Herrera was a child during the presidency of Juan Vicente Gómez and he saw political prisoners doing forced labor.

Herrera was a student at the University City of Caracas when Marcos Pérez Jiménez seized power. Herrera attempted to organise a strike at the university in 1952, but was imprisoned for four months before being deported. He lived in exile in Europe and learned Italian, German, French, and English. He returned to Venezuela after Jimenez was overthrown in 1958. He became a member of the Chamber of Deputies and Senate.

Herrera married Betty Urdaneta, with whom he had five children.

== Presidency ==
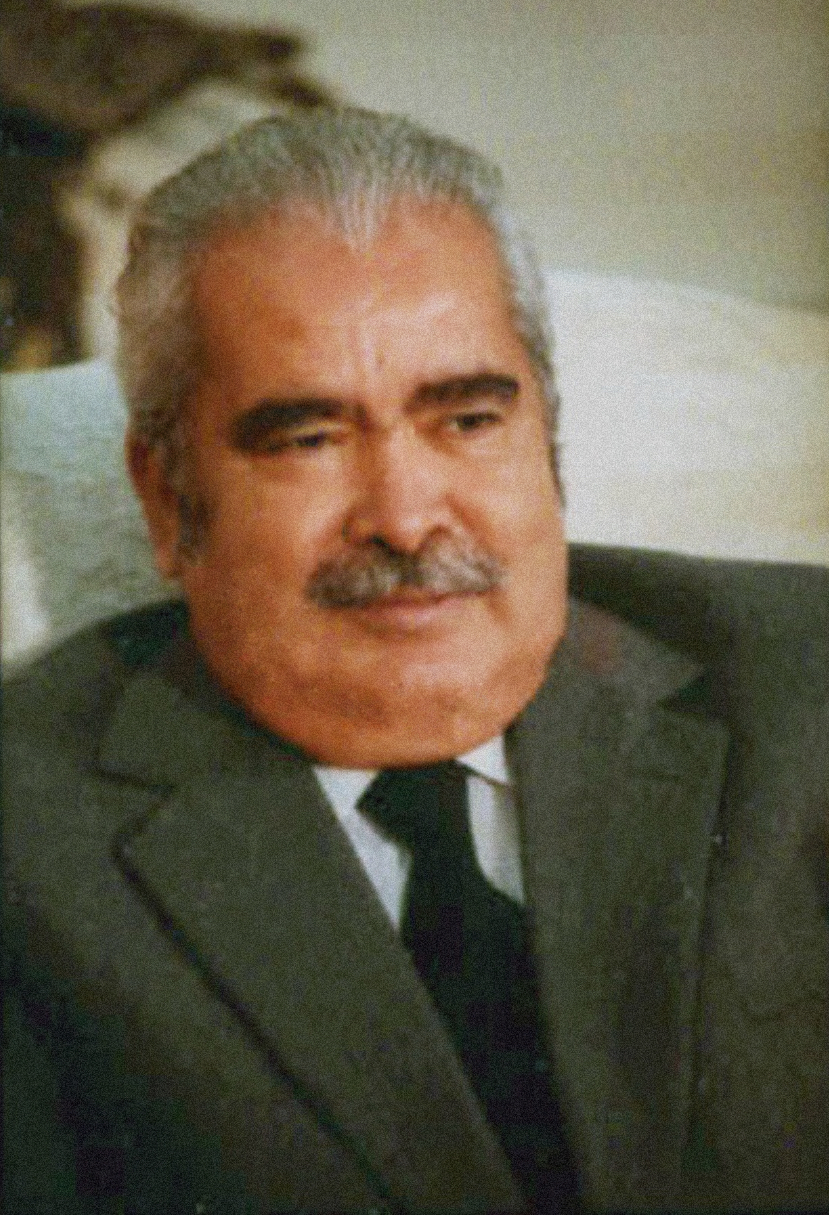
Herrera in 1981

Democratic Action (AD) was divided between Gonzalo Barrios and Luis Beltrán Prieto Figueroa during the 1968 election. This division allowed Copei nominee Rafael Caldera to win the presidency. AD was unified during the 1978 election, but Herrera won and was the second member of Copei elected to the presidency. Copei also took control of the Congress of Venezuela from Democratic Action for the first time.

As president, Herrera implemented cultural development programs, including the elaborate Teresa Carreño Theater.

Caldera and Herrera fought for control of Copei during Herrera's presidency. Caldera's supporters gained control over the party in Caracas and were able to remove state party leaders that supported Herrera.

AD regained the presidency in the 1983 election.

=== Foreign policy ===
Herrera supported El Salvador President José Napoleón Duarte. He supported the outcome of the 1982 Salvadoran presidential election.

Herrera supported Argentina during the Falklands War.

=== Economics ===
Herrera was critical of spending done during Caldera's presidency and called for austerity measures. Luis Ugueto, Herrera's first Minister of Finance, was a proponent of the Chicago school of economics. Price controls on 175 consumer products were removed during Herrera's first year as president and subsidies for imported foodstuff was ended in 1980. Venezuela's GDP was stagnate in 1979 and 1980, and decreased in 1981. Ugueto's influence waned as Venezuela faced economic issues and was frequently ignored by Herrera. Tariffs were increased on over 420 products in 1982, despite Ugueto's opposition.

Herrera kept a high exchange rate between the bolivar and US dollar until implementing exchange controls and floating the currency on 18 February 1983. An exchange rate of 4.3 to 1 was maintained for imported deemed essential, but other items would use an exchange rate of 7.5 to 1. This rate later increased to 11 to 1 by June.

== Later life ==
By the time Herrera's term ended, the economy was in meltdown, poverty and hardship were widespread and the voters turned on the ruling Copei, ejecting the party from office in the elections of December 1983.

In 2001, Herrera made headlines when gunmen stole his car. Afterwards, he could be seen on foot wearing old clothes and carrying his own groceries. He underwent a series of surgeries for an abdominal aneurysm that led to a kidney infection and other complications. Herrera died on 9 November 2007 in Caracas at the age of 82, having already retired from Venezuelan politics. He suffered from Alzheimer's disease at the time of his death.

== See also ==
- Venezuela
- Presidents of Venezuela
- Viernes Negro

== Works cited ==
=== Books ===
- "Venezuela's President‐Elect". The New York Times. 6 December 1978. p. A12. Archived from the original on 20 December 2024.
- Martz, John; Myers, David, eds. (1986). Venezuela: The Democratic Experience. Prager Publishers. ISBN 0030034647.

Political offices
Preceded by Carlos Andrés Pérez	President of Venezuela; 1979–1984	Succeeded by Jaime Lusinchi
Party political offices
Preceded by Leonardo Fernández (1973)	COPEI presidential candidate 1978 (won)	Succeeded by Rafael Caldera
