= Carlos Andrés Pérez =

President of Venezuela from 1974 to 1979 and 1989 to 1993

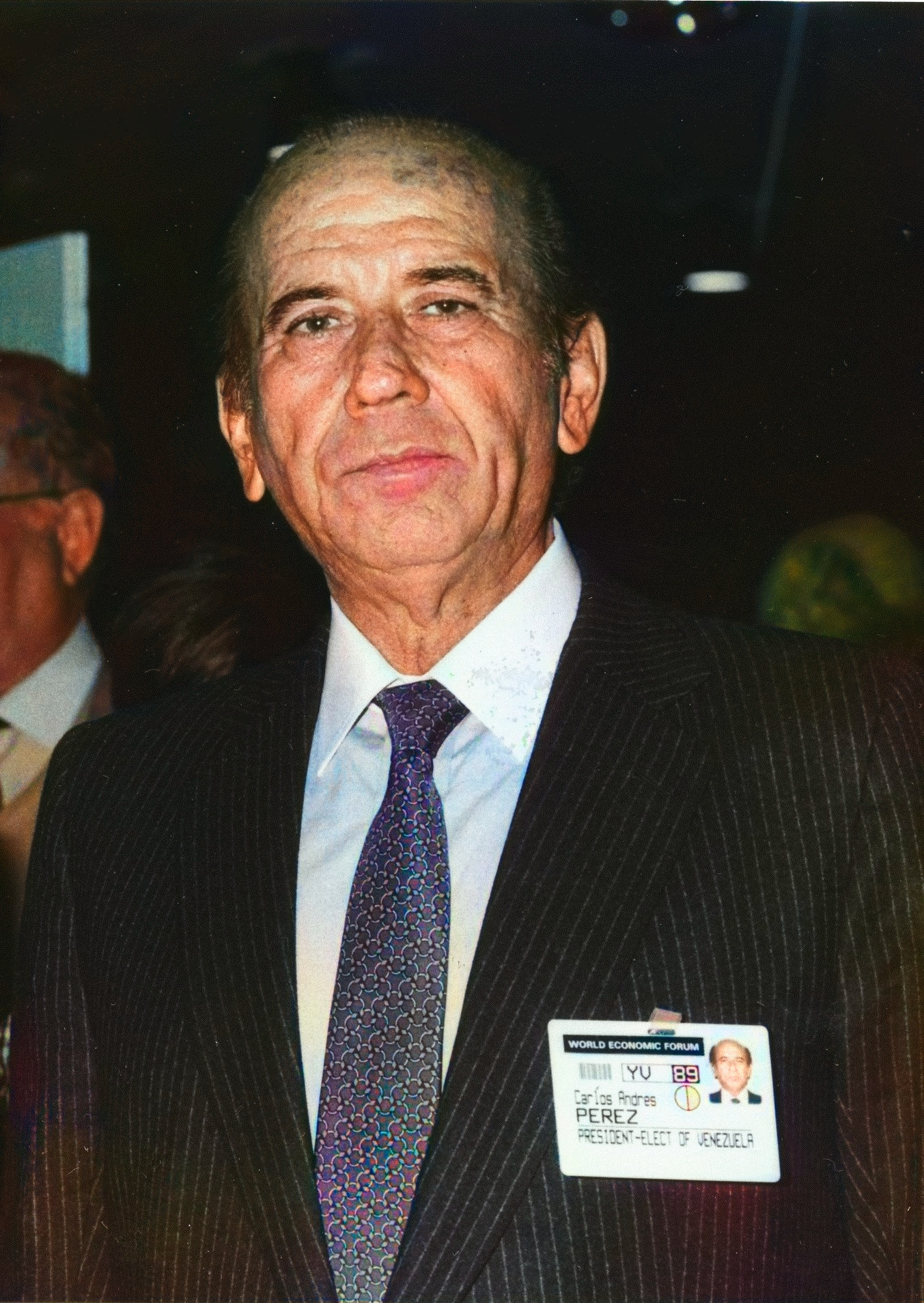
- Carlos Andrés Pérez, 1989

47th and 50th President of Venezuela
- In office 2 February 1989 – 21 May 1993
- Preceded by: Jaime Lusinchi
- Succeeded by: Octavio Lepage (acting)
- In office 11 March 1974 – 11 March 1979
- Preceded by: Rafael Caldera
- Succeeded by: Luis Herrera Campíns

Senator for Life
- In office 12 February 1999 – 28 March 2000
- In office 11 March 1979 – 2 February 1994

Vice President of the Socialist International
- In office 30 January 1976 – 30 January 1992
- President: Willy Brandt

Minister of Interior Affairs of Venezuela
- In office 12 March 1962 – 12 August 1963
- President: Rómulo Betancourt
- Preceded by: Luis Augusto Dubuc
- Succeeded by: Manuel Mantilla

Member of the Chamber of Deputies of Venezuela
- In office 5 January 1964 – 5 January 1968
- Constituency: Táchira
- In office 5 January 1958 – 2 February 1960
- Constituency: Táchira
- In office 5 January 1947 – 24 November 1948
- Constituency: Táchira

Personal details
- Born: Carlos Andrés Pérez Rodríguez; 27 October 1922 Rubio, Táchira, United States of Venezuela
- Died: 25 December 2010 (aged 88) Miami, Florida, U.S.
- Party: Acción Democrática (1941-2010)
- Spouse: Blanca Rodríguez
- Domestic partner: Cecilia Matos
- Children: Sonia Pérez; Thaís Pérez; Martha Pérez; Carlos Manuel Pérez; María de los Ángeles Pérez; María Carolina Pérez; María Francia Pérez; Cecilia Victoria Pérez
- Education: Central University of Venezuela (1932–2010); Free University of Colombia (1934–2010)

Carlos Andrés Pérez Rodríguez (27 October 1922 – 25 December 2010), also known by his initials CAP and often referred to as El Gocho (due to his Andean origins), was a Venezuelan politician who served as the 47th and 50th president of Venezuela from 1974 to 1979 and again from 1989 to 1993. He was one of the founders of Acción Democrática, the dominant political party in Venezuela during the second half of the twentieth century.

After the fall of dictator Marcos Pérez Jiménez and returning from exile, Pérez served as the interior affairs minister for Rómulo Betancourt between 1959 and 1964, when he became known for his tough response against guerrillas. His first presidency was known as the Saudi Venezuela due to its economic and social prosperity thanks to enormous income from petroleum exportation. However, his second presidency saw a continuation of the economic crisis of the 1980s, a series of social crises, widespread riots known as the Caracazo and two coup attempts in 1992. In May 1993 he became the first Venezuelan president to be impeached by the Supreme Court on charges for the embezzlement of 250 million bolívars (roughly 2.7 million US dollars) belonging to a presidential discretionary fund, whose money was used to interfere in the 1990 Nicaraguan general election and hire bodyguards for President Violeta Chamorro.

== Early life and education ==
Carlos Andrés Pérez was born at the hacienda La Argentina, on the Venezuelan-Colombian border near the town of Rubio, Táchira state, the 11th of 12 children in a middle-class family. His father, Antonio Pérez Lemus, was a Colombian-born coffee planter and pharmacist of Spanish Peninsular and Canary Islander ancestry who emigrated to Venezuela during the last years of the 19th century. His mother, Julia Rodríguez, was the daughter of a prominent landowner in the town of Rubio and the granddaughter of Venezuelan refugees who had fled to the Andes and Colombia in the wake of the Federal War, a civil war that ravaged Venezuela in the 1860s.

Pérez was educated at the María Inmaculada School in Rubio, run by Dominican friars. His childhood was spent between the family home in town, a rambling Spanish colonial-style house, and the coffee haciendas owned by his father and maternal grandfather. Influenced by his grandfather, an avid book collector, Pérez read voraciously from an early age, including French and Spanish classics by Jules Verne and Alexandre Dumas. As he grew older, Pérez also became politically aware and managed to read Voltaire, Rousseau, and Marx without the knowledge of his deeply conservative parents.

The combination of falling coffee prices, business disputes, and harassment orchestrated by henchmen allied to dictator Juan Vicente Gómez, led to the financial ruin and physical deterioration of Antonio Pérez, who died of a heart attack in 1936. This episode would force the widow Julia and her sons to move to Venezuela's capital, Caracas, in 1939, where two of Pérez's eldest brothers had gone to attend university. The death of his father had a profound impact on the young Pérez, bolstering his convictions that democratic freedoms and rights were the only guarantees against the arbitrary, and tyrannical, use of state power.

In Caracas, Pérez enrolled in the renowned Liceo Andrés Bello, where he graduated in 1944 with a major in Philosophy and Letters. In 1944, he enrolled for three years in the Law School of the Central University of Venezuela and one year in the Law School of the Free University of Colombia. However, the intensification of his political activism would prevent Pérez from ever completing his law degree.

== Political life ==
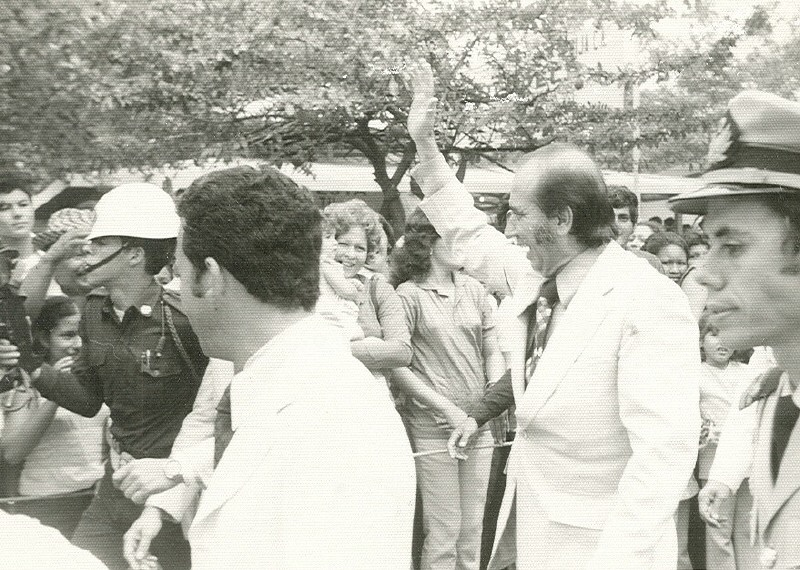
Carlos Andrés Pérez during his first term in office

The political life of Carlos Andrés Pérez began at the age of 15, when he became a founding member of the Venezuelan Youth Association and a member of the National Democratic Party, both of which were opposed to the repressive administration of General Eleazar López Contreras, who had succeeded the dictatorship of Juan Vicente Gómez in 1935. He also co-operated with the first labour unions in his region. When he moved to Caracas, in 1939, he started an ascendant political career as a youth leader and founder of the Democratic Action (AD) party, in which he would play an important role during the 20th century, first as a close ally to party founder Rómulo Betancourt and then as a political leader in his own right.

In October 1945, a group of civilians and young army officers plotted the overthrow of the government run by General Isaías Medina Angarita. At the age of 23, Pérez was appointed Private Secretary to the Junta President, Rómulo Betancourt, and became Cabinet Secretary in 1946. However, in 1948, when the military staged a coup against the democratically elected government of Rómulo Gallegos, Pérez was forced to go into exile (going to Cuba, Panama and Costa Rica) for a decade. He temporarily returned to Venezuela secretly in 1952 to complete special missions in his fight against the new dictatorial government. He was imprisoned on various occasions and spent more than two years in jail in total. In Costa Rica, he was active in Venezuelan political refugee circles, worked as Editor in Chief of the newspaper La República and kept in close contact with Betancourt and other AD leaders.

In 1958, after the fall of dictator Marcos Pérez Jiménez, Pérez returned to Venezuela and participated in the reorganization of the AD Party. He served as Minister of Interior and Justice from 1959 to 1964 and made his mark as a tough minister and canny politician who worked to neutralize small, disruptive and radical right-wing and left-wing insurrections, the latter Cuban-influenced and Cuban-financed, that were being staged around the country. This was an important step in the pacification of the country in the mid-to-late 1960s, the consolidation of democracy and the integration of radical parties into the political process. Pérez was accused, however, of human rights violations during his tenure.

In 1977, The New York Times reported that Interior Minister Carlos Andrés Pérez had allegedly received secret payments from the Central Intelligence Agency (CIA) during Betancourt's government. Betancourt and Pérez denied the accusations.

After the end of the Betancourt administration and the 1963 elections, Pérez left government temporarily and dedicated himself to consolidating his support in the party. During this time, he served as head of the AD in Congress and was elected to the position of Secretary General of AD, a role that was crucial in laying the ground for his presidential ambitions.

=== First presidency ===
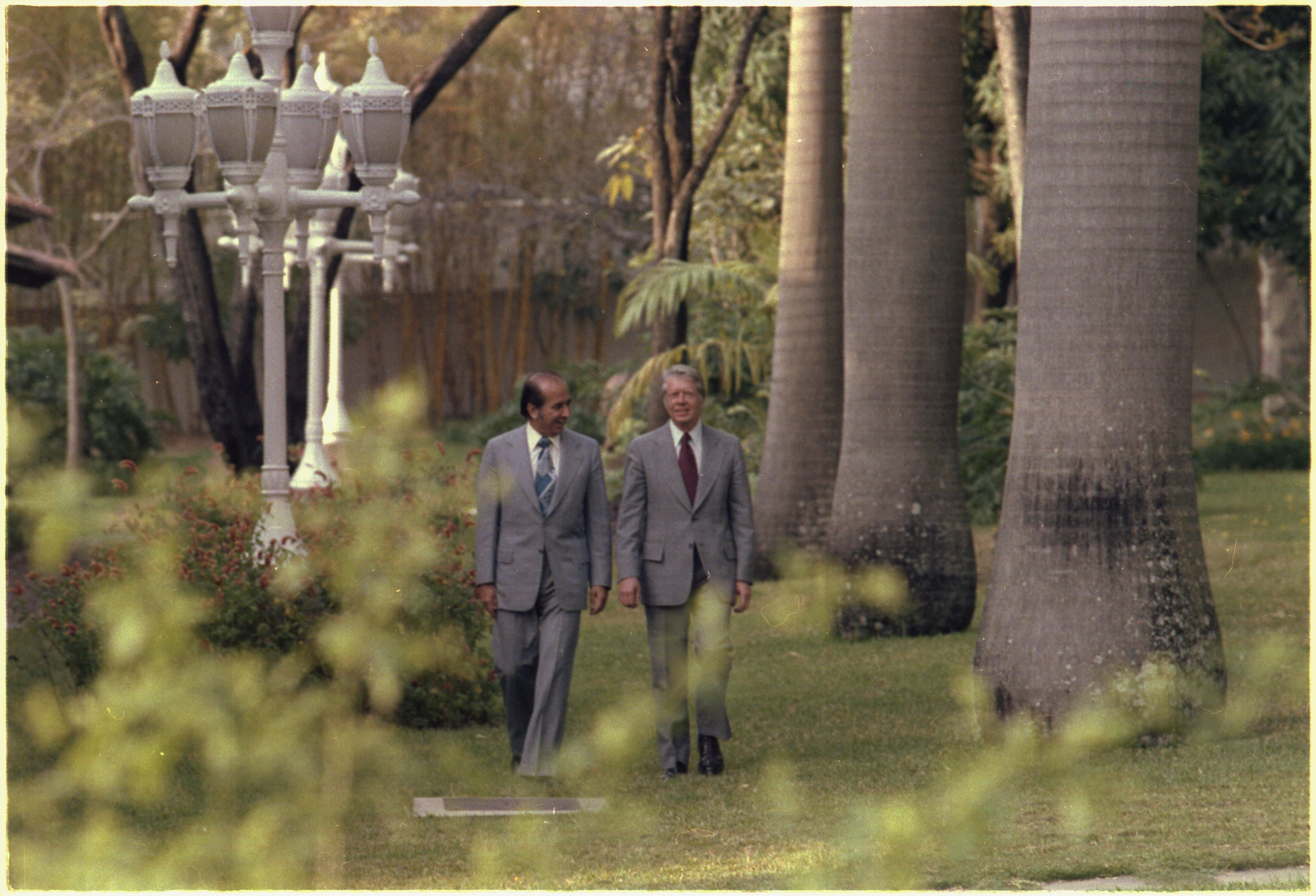
United States President Jimmy Carter and Carlos Andrés Pérez in Caracas, 1978

In 1973, Carlos Andrés Pérez was nominated to run for the presidency for AD. Youthful and energetic, Pérez ran a vibrant and triumphalist campaign, one of the first to use the services of American advertising gurus and political consultants in the country's history. During the run up to elections, he visited nearly all the villages and cities of Venezuela by foot and walked more than 5800 kilometers. He was elected in December of that year, receiving 48.7% of the vote against the 36.7% of his main rival. Turnout in these elections reached an unprecedented 97% of all eligible voters, a level which has not been achieved since.

One of the most radical aspects of Pérez's program for government was the notion that petroleum oil was a tool for developing countries like Venezuela to attain first world status and usher a fairer, more equitable international order. International events, including the Yom Kippur War of 1973, contributed to the implementation of this vision. Drastic increases in petroleum prices during the 1970s energy crisis led to an economic bonanza for the country just as Pérez started his term. Using high oil prices, Pérez bolstered his support, buying patronage by subsidizing prices, increasing wages and tripling public spending. His policies, including the nationalization of the iron and petroleum industries. Following the establishment of PDVSA, corruption in Venezuela as a system of patrimonialism was created. He also promoted investment in large state-owned industrial projects for the production of aluminium and hydroelectric energy, infrastructure improvements and the funding of social welfare and scholarship programmes, were ambitious and involved massive government spending, to the tune of almost $53 billion. His measures to protect the environment and foster sustainable development earned the Earth Care award in 1975, the first time a Latin American leader had received this recognition.

In the international arena, Pérez supported democratic and progressive causes in Latin America and the world. He reestablished diplomatic relations with Cuba and submitted a resolution to the Organization of American States (OAS) that would have lifted economic sanctions against the country. He opposed the Somoza and Augusto Pinochet dictatorships and played a crucial role in the finalizing of the agreement for the transfer of the Panama Canal from American to Panamanian control. In 1975, with Mexican President Luis Echeverría, he founded SELA, the Latin American Economic System, created to foster economic cooperation and scientific exchange between the nations of Latin America. He also supported the democratization process in Spain, as he brought Felipe González, who was living in exile, back to Spain in a private flight and thus strengthened the Spanish Socialist Workers Party (PSOE). Additionally, he negotiated a treaty with the USSR that called for it to supply oil to Venezuela's Spanish market in exchange for Venezuela supplying the Soviet market in Cuba.

Towards the end of his first term in office, Pérez's faced criticism for excessive government spending. His administration was often referred to as Saudi Venezuela for its grandiose and extravagant ambitions. In addition, there were allegations of corruption and trafficking of influence, often involving members of Pérez's intimate circle, such as his mistress Cecilia Matos, or financiers and businessmen who donated to his election campaign, known as the "Twelve Apostles". A well-publicized rift with his former mentor Betancourt and disgruntled members of AD all pointed to the fading of Pérez's political standing. By the 1978 elections, there was a sense among many citizens that the influx of petrodollars after 1973 had not been properly managed. The country was importing 80% of all foodstuffs consumed. Agricultural production was stagnant. The national debt had skyrocketed. And whilst per capita income had increased and prosperity was evident in Caracas and other major cities, the country was also more expensive and a significant minority of Venezuelans were still mired in poverty. This malaise led to the defeat of AD at the polls by the opposition Social Christian Party. The newly elected president, Luis Herrera Campíns, famously stated in his inaugural speech that he was "inheriting a mortgaged country."

==== Post-first term ====
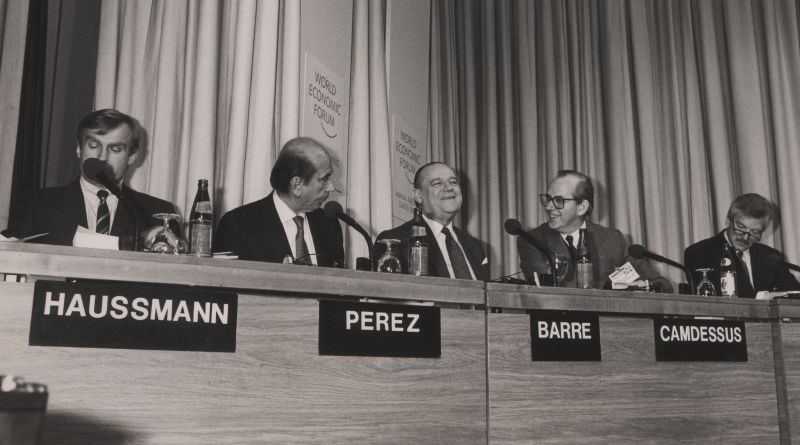
Helmut Haussmann, Carlos Andrés Pérez, Raymond Barre, Michel Camdessus and David Campbell Mulford at the World Economic Forum Annual Meeting, 1989

Carlos Andrés Pérez maintained a high profile in international affairs. In 1980, he was elected president of the Latin American Association of Human Rights. He collaborated with Tanzanian President Julius Nyerere in the organization of the South-South Commission. He actively participated in the Socialist International, where he served as vice-president for three consecutive terms, under the presidency of Willy Brandt from West Germany. Willy Brandt and Carlos Andrés Pérez, together with the Dominican Republic's José Francisco Peña Gómez, expanded the activities of the Socialist International from Europe to Latin America. In 1988, he became a Member of the Council of Freely-Elected Heads of Government, established by the former President of the United States, Jimmy Carter. He was elected Chairman of the Harvard University Conference on Foreign Debt in Latin America, in September 1989, and received the Henry and Nancy Bartels World Affairs Fellowship at Cornell University.

=== Second presidency ===
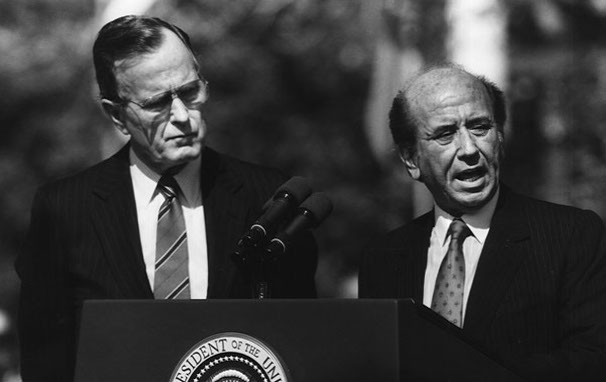
President Carlos Andrés Pérez next to US President George H. W. Bush during a visit to Washington during his second term in office

He based his campaign for the 1988 Venezuelan general election in his legacy of abundance during his first presidential period and initially rejected liberalization policies. Venezuela's international reserves were only US$300 million at the time of Pérez' election into the presidency; Pérez decided to respond to the debt, public spending, economic restrictions and rentier state by liberalizing the economy. The International Monetary Fund (IMF) offered Venezuela a loan for 4.5 billion US dollars with the condition of the application of austerity measures. Carlos Andrés announced a technocratic cabinet and a group of economic policies to fix macroeconomic imbalances known as El Gran Viraje (English: The Great Turn), called by detractors as El Paquetazo Económico (English: The Economic Package). Pérez implemented such reforms without the support of political groups, including his own AD party, resulting with the AD blocking his future policies in Congress and pulling its support, with many perceiving the package as an act of betrayal.

Among the policies there was the reduction of fuel subsidies and the increase of public transportation fares by thirty percent (VEB 16 Venezuelan bolívares, or US$0.4). The increase was supposed to be implemented on 1 March 1989, but bus drivers decided to apply the price rise on 27 February, a day before payday in Venezuela. In response, protests and rioting began on the morning of 27 February 1989 in Guarenas, a town near Caracas, known as El Caracazo. a lack of timely intervention by authorities, as the Caracas Metropolitan Police was on a labor strike, led to the protests and rioting quickly spreading to the capital and other towns across the country. The response resulted in the declaration of a state of emergency and led to a large number of deaths, ranging from the official estimate of 277 dead to extraofficial estimates of up to 5,000, the most violent period of unrest in Venezuela's democratic history. The deaths were attributed to Pérez's implementation of Plan Ávila, which resulted with authorities killing protesters.

Amnesty International and Human Rights Watch reported that human rights in Venezuela deteriorated during Pérez's administration, with the latter human rights groups writing in 1993 that his "tenure was marked by an increase in human rights violations, including arbitrary detentions, torture, extrajudicial executions, the violent repression of popular demonstrations and protests." Torture in Venezuela during the Carlos Andrés Pérez administration was common according to Amnesty international, with the group saying that while the government and its laws condemned human rights abuses, authorities still performed torture methods that were "simple but sophisticated: they are designed to cause maximum pain with the minimum of marks." The human rights group further reported that poor citizens, including minors, were often victims of police raids and arbitrary detention, being subsequently tortured on many occasions.

By late 1991, Carlos Andrés Pérez' administration received a total of US$2.287 billion due to privatization reforms. The most notable auction was CANTV's, a telecommunications company, which was sold at the price of US$1.885 billion to the consortium composed of American AT&T International, General Telephone Electronic and the Venezuelan Electricidad de Caracas and Banco Mercantil. The privatization ended Venezuela's monopoly over telecommunications and surpassed predictions, selling over US$1 billion above the base price and US$500 million more than the bid offered by its next competitor. By the end of the year, inflation had dropped to 31%, Venezuela's international reserves were now worth US$14 billion and there was an economic growth of 9% (called as an "Asian growth"), the largest in Latin America at the time. Overall, the results of liberalization policies were mixed; by 1992 many of the achievements were reversed, inflation remained between thirty and forty percent and Venezuela did not become macro-economically stable. The main accomplishment during this period was that Venezuela was finally able to pay international debtors.

In 1992, his government survived two coup attempts. The first attempt took place 4 February 1992, and was led by Lieutenant-Colonel Hugo Chávez, who was later elected president. With the attempt having clearly failed, Chávez was catapulted into the national spotlight when he was allowed to appear live on national television to call for all remaining rebel detachments in Venezuela to cease hostilities. When he did so, Chávez famously quipped on national television that he had only failed "por ahora"—"for now". The second, and much bloodier, insurrection took place on 27 November 1992, with many more deaths than in the first case. Multiple reports of political opponents, grassroots activists and students being tortured occurred during the period when the Pérez suspended constitutional guarantees.

=== Impeachment ===
On 20 March 1993, Attorney General Ramón Escovar Salom introduced action against Pérez for the embezzlement of 250 million bolivars belonging to a presidential discretionary fund, or partida secreta. The issue had originally been brought to public scrutiny in November 1992 by journalist José Vicente Rangel. The money was used to interfere in the 1990 Nicaraguan general election, and during the process it was revealed that the money was used to support and hire bodyguards for President Violeta Chamorro. On 21 May 1993, the Supreme Court considered the accusation valid, and the following day the Senate voted to strip Pérez of his immunity. Many of those in the Senate who supported Pérez's impeachment were members of AD. Pérez refused to resign, but after the maximum 90 days temporary leave available to the President under Article 188 of the 1961 constitution, the National Congress removed Pérez from office permanently on 31 August.

== Post-presidency ==
Pérez' trial concluded in May 1996, and he was sentenced to 28 months in prison.

In 1998, he was prosecuted again, this time on charges of embezzlement on public funds, accused of having secret joint bank accounts held in New York with his mistress, Cecilia Matos. Before the trial, he was elected to the Senate of Venezuela for his native State of Táchira, on the ticket of his newly founded party, Movimiento de Apertura y Participación Nacional (Apertura), thus gaining immunity from prosecutions. However, as the newly approved 1999 Constitution of Venezuela dissolved the Senate and created a unicameral National Assembly, Pérez lost his seat. In 1999, he ran again for the National Assembly, but did not gain a seat. On 20 December 2001, while in the Dominican Republic, a court in Caracas ordered his detention, on charges of embezzlement of public funds. On 3 February 2002, he was formally asked in extradition.

After that, he self-exiled in Miami, Florida, from where he became an opponent of President Hugo Chávez. On 23 October 2003, at 80 years old, he suffered a stroke that left him partially disabled. While in Miami, following the Daktari Ranch affair, Pérez said that the plot was a hoax but that Chávez had to be forcibly removed, saying that "Chávez has rejected all the peaceful exits that have been presented to him" and "it is not that I am in favor of violence, but that there is no other way out of Chavez".

In 2009, Venezuelan attorney general Luisa Ortega Díaz ordered the extradition of Pérez due to his implementation of the Plan Ávila.

== Personal life ==
At the age of 26 he married his first cousin Blanca Rodríguez with whom he had six children: Sonia, Thais, Martha, Carlos Manuel, María de Los Angeles and María Carolina. In the late 1960s, he began an extramarital relationship with his then secretary Cecilia Matos. He also had two daughters with Cecilia, María Francia and Cecilia Victoria Pérez, while married to Blanca Rodríguez. Matos became a notorious figure in Venezuelan politics beginning in the 1970s and through the 1990s, the result of rumours of corruption and trafficking of influence centred around her role as the President's mistress. Such allegations of corruption were damaging to Pérez's political standing.

Although Pérez initiated divorce proceedings against his wife in 1998, the action failed and was discontinued. Until his death, Pérez remained legally married to Blanca although he had been living in exile since 1998 with Matos, dividing his time between his homes in Miami, the Dominican Republic and New York. In 2003, he suffered a debilitating stroke that seriously affected his mental and physical abilities. On 31 March 2008, the secretary general of Acción Democrática, Henry Ramos Allup, announced that Pérez wanted to return to Venezuela from exile, to spend his last years in Caracas.

== Death ==
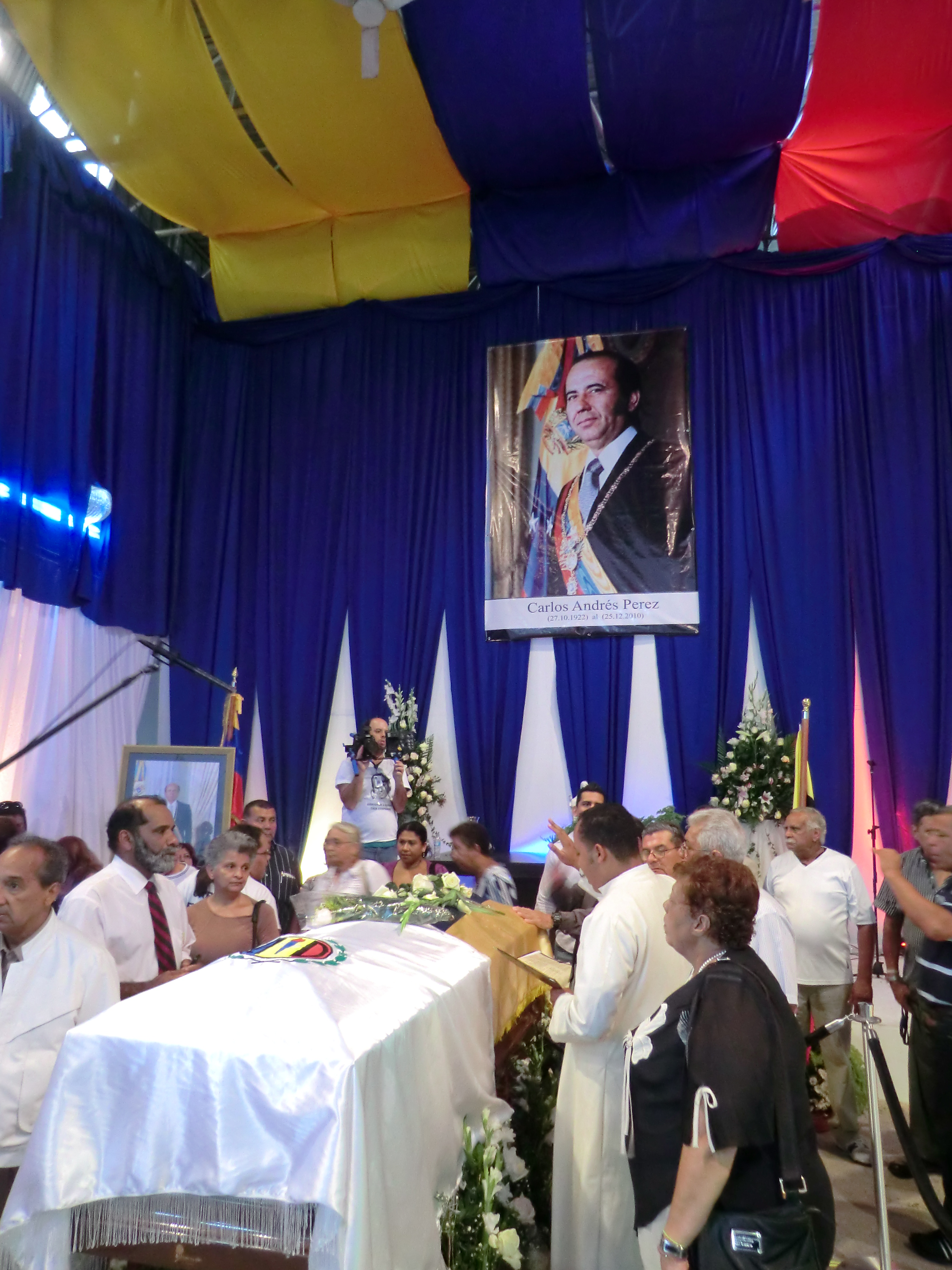
Funeral of Carlos Andrés Pérez in Caracas

On 25 December 2010, Pérez was rushed to Mercy Hospital in Miami, where he died that same afternoon. The cause of death was initially reported as having been a heart attack, but was later referred to as "respiratory failure". It later emerged that Blanca Rodríguez and Pérez's four daughters and son learned of Pérez's death from a news website, as neither Matos nor her daughters notified them of the loss. Chávez offered condolences, but commented that he hopes Pérez's way of governing would not return to the country: "May he rest in peace. But with him ... may the form of politics that he personified rest in peace and leave here forever."

Pérez's relatives in Miami said that Pérez would be buried in Miami and that they have no intention of returning his remains to Venezuela until Chávez was no longer in office. Less than 24 hours before the burial, legal representatives for Blanca Rodríguez obtained a court order to stop the ceremony. The order was based on Blanca Rodríguez's legal right as Pérez's widow to determine where he would be buried. It was reported that Miami relatives agreed to her wish to return Pérez's body to Venezuela but later they denied having reached to an agreement.

On 4 October 2011, the remains of Pérez were brought back to Venezuela, nine months after his death. The casket arrived in a flight originated from Atlanta, Georgia, escorted by Mayor of Caracas Antonio Ledezma, friend of Pérez and member of Democratic Action (AD). Once in Caracas it was transported to the Headquarters of AD, where over 5,000 people waited to see the hearse and the casket covered with the Venezuelan flag. Pérez remains were interred on 6 October 2011. Cecilia Matos died in Bogotá, Colombia, from kidney and respiratory problems aged 66. Her death came 25 days after Pérez was buried, following a prolonged family dispute about where his final resting place should be.

== In popular culture ==
The documentary film CAP 2 Intentos (English: CAP 2 Attempts), directed by Carlos Oteyza, focuses on the two non-consecutive presidential tenures of Andrés Pérez.

Oteyza later released another documentary, CAP Inédito (CAP Unedited), featuring including previously unpublished material and from a private point of view.

== Honour ==
=== Foreign honours ===
- Italy:
  - Knight Grand Cross with Collar of the Order of Merit of the Italian Republic (17 November 1976)
- Portugal:
  - Grand Collar of the Military Order of Saint James of the Sword (1 June 1977)
- Spain:
  - Collar of the Order of Charles III (6 September 1978)
- Malaysia:
  - Honorary Recipient of the Order of the Crown of the Realm (1990)
- Jamaica:
  - Honorary Member of the Order of Jamaica
- Yugoslavia
  - Order of the Yugoslav Great Star

== See also ==
- List of presidents of Venezuela
- List of ministers of interior of Venezuela
- List of governors of Federal District of Venezuela

== Bibliography ==
- Hernández, Ramón and Roberto Giusti. "Memorias Proscritas". Caracas: Editorial El Nacional, 2006
- Rivero, Mirtha (2011). La rebelión de los náufragos (9th ed.). Alfa. ISBN 978-980-354-295-5.
- Márquez, Laureano; Sanabria, Eduardo (2018). "La democracia pierde energía". Historieta de Venezuela: De Macuro a Maduro (1st ed.). Gráficas Pedrazas. ISBN 978-1-7328777-1-9.
- Tarver, H. Micheal. The Rise and Fall of Venezuelan President Carlos Andrés Pérez: An Historical Examination, Volume 1: The Early Years 1936-1973. Lewiston, New York: Edwin Mellen Press, 2001.
- Tarver, H. Micheal. The Rise and Fall of Venezuelan President Carlos Andrés Pérez: An Historical Examination, Volume 2: The Later Years 1973–2004. Lewiston, New York: Edwin Mellen Press, 2005.
- Tarver, H. Micheal and Luis A. Caraballo Vivas. "Administrative Corruption: The Case of Carlos Andres Perez." Current World Leaders Volume 37 Number 6 (December 1994): 75–97.

Party political offices
Preceded by Gonzalo Barrios (1968)	AD presidential candidate 1973 (won)	Succeeded by Luis Piñerúa Ordaz (1978)
Preceded by Jaime Lusinchi (1983)	AD presidential candidate 1988 (won)	Succeeded by Claudio Fermín (1993)
Political offices
Preceded by —	National Congress Deputy; 1964–1973	Succeeded by —
Preceded by Rafael Caldera	President of Venezuela; 12 March 1974–12 March 1979	Succeeded by Luis Herrera Campíns
Preceded by Jaime Lusinchi	President of Venezuela; 2 February 1989–21 May 1993	Succeeded by Octavio Lepage
