= Fugitive bankers case =

The Case of the Fugitive Bankers was a political scandal in Venezuela that came about during the 1994 banking crisis, when several banks collapsed and their directors fled the country. Among them were Orlando Castro Llanes, Fernando Araújo, director of Banco Metropolitano and son-in-law of then-president, Rafael Caldera, Gustavo Gómez López of Banco Latino, José Bauza of Banco de Venezuela, and José Alvarez Sterling of Banco Consolidado.

The government of Rafael Caldera intervened in and nationalized 19 failed banking institutions, providing them with $7.5 billion between 1994 and 1995 through the so-called "financial assistance" programs. The bailout failed to resolve the banking crisis and instead contributed to an imbalance in the country's public finances, leading to a subsequent economic adjustment that led to social unrest. The bankers were able to flee the country without being stopped by the justice system, which also generated criticism.

Fernando Araújo was convicted on several charges, among them the diversion and fraudulent use of public funds, offences carrying prison sentences of between two and ten years.

Attorney general Jesús Petit accompanied New York prosecutor Robert Morgenthau when the latter announced the arrest of Orlando Castro Llanes, a Cuban-born banker, as well as the opening of fraud and theft proceedings against Castro, his son Orlando, and his grandson Jorge Castro. On 9 May 1996, Castro testified before a Florida court that he had contributed a check for 20 million bolívares to Rafael Caldera's presidential campaign. Castro also contributed to Bill Clinton's presidential compaign. In 1997, Vladimir Petit, a deputy and the son of Jesús Petit, acknowledged receiving money from Castro for political activities, saying that he had done so "in the same way as other important Venezuelan and foreign politicians had done."

== See also ==
- Second presidency of Rafael Caldera
