= List of ambassadors of Russia to Paraguay =

Ambassador of the Russian Federation to the Republic of Paraguay
- Emblem of the Russian Foreign Ministry
- Incumbent; Aleksandr Pisarev since 5 October 2020
- Ministry of Foreign Affairs; Embassy of Russia in Asunción
- Style: His Excellency
- Reports to: Minister of Foreign Affairs
- Seat: Asunción
- Appointer: President of Russia
- Term length: At the pleasure of the president
- Website: Embassy of Russia in Paraguay

The ambassador extraordinary and plenipotentiary of Russia to Paraguay is the official representative of the president and the government of the Russian Federation to the president and the government of Paraguay.

The ambassador and his staff work at large in the Embassy of Russia in Asunción. The post of Russian ambassador to Paraguay is currently held by Aleksandr Pisarev, incumbent since 5 October 2020.

== History of diplomatic relations ==
Diplomatic relations between Paraguay and the Russian Empire were established in 1909, when the incumbent representative to Brazil, Mavriky Prozor, was given dual accreditation to Paraguay. Representation continued through the early twentieth century, but was suspended after the October Revolution of 1917 brought the Bolshevik regime to power. Relations remained suspended for the entirety of the existence of the Soviet Union, and were only established on 14 May 1992, shortly after the dissolution of the Soviet Union and the emergence of the Russian Federation as its successor state. Relations were initially handled through the embassy in Argentina, with the ambassador to Argentina dually accredited to Paraguay, until December 2008, when the embassy in Asunción was opened and Igor Yezhov was appointed the first ambassador solely accredited to Paraguay.

== List of representatives (1909–present) ==
=== Russian Empire to Paraguay (1909–1917) ===
Name	Title	Appointment	Termination	Notes
Mavriky Prozor	Envoy	24 April 1909	1909	Concurrently representative to Brazil; Credentials presented on 24 April 1909
Pyotr Maksimov	Envoy	1909	November 1915	Concurrently representative to Brazil
Aleksandr Shcherbatsky	Envoy	1916	1917	Concurrently representative to Brazil

=== Russian Provisional Government to Paraguay (1917) ===
Name	Title	Appointment	Termination	Notes
Aleksandr Shcherbatsky	Envoy	1917	26 November 1917	Concurrently representative to Brazil

=== Russian Federation to Paraguay (1993-present) ===
Name	Title	Appointment	Termination	Notes
Yan Burlyai	Ambassador	28 December 1993	8 June 1996	Concurrently ambassador to Argentina
Vladimir Tyurdenev	Ambassador	8 June 1996	22 August 2000	Concurrently ambassador to Argentina
Yevgeny Astakhov	Ambassador	22 August 2000	13 July 2004	Concurrently ambassador to Argentina
Yury Korchagin	Ambassador	13 July 2004	22 December 2008	Concurrently ambassador to Argentina
Igor Yezhov	Ambassador	22 December 2008	1 May 2011	Credentials presented on 6 April 2009
Sergey Reshchikov	Chargé d'affaires	2011	2012	
Grigory Mashkov	Ambassador	25 April 2012	25 June 2015	
Nikolai Tavdumadze	Ambassador	25 June 2015	5 October 2020	
Aleksandr Pisarev	Ambassador	5 October 2020		Credentials presented on 9 February 2021
