= Presidency of Rafael Caldera =

Presidency of Rafael Caldera may refer to:

- First presidency of Rafael Caldera
- Second presidency of Rafael Caldera
