= Second presidency of Rafael Caldera =

Venezuelan presidential administration from 1994 to 1999

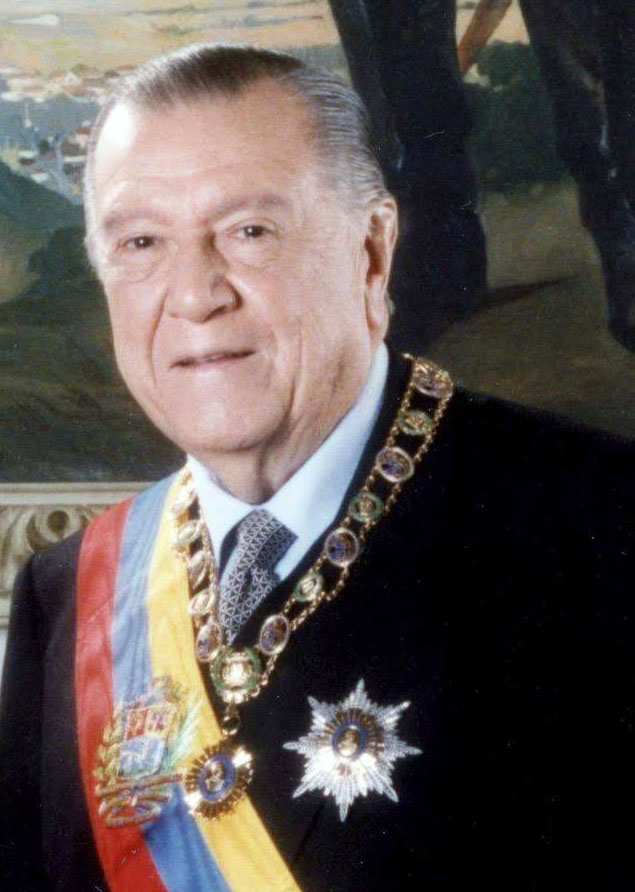
- Rafael Caldera in his second presidency on February 7 1994
- Second Presidency of Rafael Caldera; February 2, 1994 – February 2, 1999
- Cabinet: see list
- Party: National Convergence
- Election: 1993
- Seat: Miraflores Palace
- Presidential Standard (From 1997)

The second presidency of Rafael Caldera or the Second Caldera Presidency or the Second Caldera Administration was Rafael Caldera's second tenure as the President of Venezuela, which began upon his second Inauguration, on February 2, 1994, and ended on February 2, 1999 after Hugo Chávez won the 1998 elections. He has previously been president from 1969 to 1974.

== Presidential campaign ==
Venezuelan Presidential election 1993
Candidates	Votes	%
Rafael Caldera	1,710,722	30.46%
Claudio Fermín	1,325,287	23.60%
Oswaldo Alvarez Paz	1,276,506	22.73%
Andrés Velásquez	1,232,653	21.95%
Abstention:	3,859,579	39.84%
Total votes:	5,829,216	

Andrés Caldera, the son of Rafael Caldera, served as the campaign's general secretary. Political strategist J. J. Rendón, who had previously advised Carlos Andrés Pérez in his campaign, also provided counsel to Rafael Caldera during his successful election bid.

In 1996, Cuban banker Orlando Castro Llanes testified in a Florida (U.S.) court that he had financed Caldera's campaign with a check for 20 million bolívars during the election.

== Cabinet ==
1994-1999
Minister	Name	Períod
Internal Relations	Ramón Escovar Salom	1994–1996
Internal Relations	José Guillermo Andueza	1996–1998
Internal Relations	Asdrúbal Aguiar	1998–1999
Foreign Affairs	Miguel Ángel Burelli Rivas	1994–1999
Treasury	Julio Sosa Rodríguez	1994–1995
Treasury	Luis Ramón Matos Azócar	1995–1998
Treasury	Freddy Rojas Parra	1998
Treasury	Maritza Izaguirre	1998–1999
Defense	Rafael Montero Revette	1994–1995
Defense	Moisés Orozco Graterol	1995–1996
Defense	Pedro Valencia Vivas	1996–1997
Defense	Tito Manlio Rincón Bravo	1997–1999
Development	Luis Carlos Palacios	1994
Development	Alberto Poletto	1994–1995
Development	Werner Corrales	1995–1996
Transport and Communications	César Quintín Rosales	1994
Transport and Communications	Ciro Zaa Álvarez	1994–1996
Transport and Communications	Moisés Orozco Graterol	1996–1998
Transport and Communications	Julio César Martí Espina	1998–1999
Educación	Antonio Luis Cárdenas	1994–1999
Justice	Rubén Creixens Savignon	1994–1996
Justice	Enrique Meier Echeverría	1996–1997
Justice	Hilarión Cardozo Esteva	1997–1999
Energy and Mines	Edwin Arrieta Valera	1994–1999
Work	Juan Nepomuceno Garrido	1994–1997
Work	María Bernardoni de Govea	1997–1999
Environment	Roberto Pérez Lecuna	1994–1997
Environment	Rafael Martínez Monró	1997–1999
Agriculture and Breeding	Ciro Añez Fonseca	1994–1995
Agriculture and Breeding	Raúl Alegrett Ruiz	1995–1998
Agriculture and Breeding	Ramón Ramírez López	1998–1999
Health and Social Care	Vicente Pérez Dávila	1994
Health and Social Care	Carlos Walter Valecillos	1994–1995
Health and Social Care	Pedro Rincón Gutiérrez	1995–1997
Health and Social Care	José Félix Oletta	1997–1999
Urban Development	Ciro Zaa Álvarez	1994
Urban Development	Francisco González	1994–1997
Urban Development	Julio César Martí Espina	1997–1998
Urban Development	Luis Granados	1998–1999
Family	Mercedes Pulido de Briceño	1994–1996
Family	Carlos Altimari Gásperi	1996–1999
Industry and Commerce	Freddy Rojas Parra	1997–1998
Industry and Commerce	Héctor Maldonado Lira	1998–1999
Dispatch	Andrés Caldera	1994–1996
Dispatch	Asdrúbal Aguiar	1996–1998
Dispatch	José Guillermo Andueza	1998–1999
Cordiplan	Enzo Del Búffalo	1994
Cordiplan	Luis Carlos Palacios	1994
Cordiplan	Werner Corrales	1994–1995
Cordiplan	Edgar Paredes Pisani	1995–1996
Cordiplan	Teodoro Petkoff	1996–1999
CVG	Alfredo Grúber	1994
CVG	Elías Innaty	1994–1999

== Domestic policy ==
In his second presidency, Caldera included politicians from other political backgrounds who supported his candidacy in his cabinet, like some representatives of MAS party, Teodoro Petkoff at the Ministry of the Central Office of Coordination and Planning, and Pompeyo Márquez at the Border Ministry, as well as some independents in other ministries. In any case the support of the MAS and other parties were fundamental to approve some laws in the National Congress in his first years of government, due to his own party having few seats in Congress. Due to differences with his coalition partners such as MAS, Caldera looked for the support of AD in Congress. Some AD members entered the Ministerial cabinet.

=== Legislative policy ===
Composition of the Senate (1993–1998): in light green, Caldera's party, Convergence.

Composition of the Chamber of Deputies (1993–1998).

Rafael Caldera had the support in Congress of his party Convergence and the Movement for Socialism (MAS), which together accounted for approximately one third of the votes, and therefore did not possess a parliamentary majority. In this context, Rafael Caldera publicly announced the possibility of convening a constituent assembly and dissolving Congress if he failed to reach agreements that would allow him to govern.

=== Judicial policy ===
In 1994 Caldera fulfilled a promise made during the presidential campaign and pardoned the military figures involved in the 1992 Venezuelan coup d'état attempts. Many of these, once liberated, grouped in the political party MVR, under the leadership of Hugo Chávez, who ultimately, after several years in the political wilderness, won the 1998 presidential elections. Caldera later wrote in an article for El Universal that he regretted granting the pardon to Chávez.

On 18 April 1996, Antonio Espinoza, a member of the Bandera Roja party, was arrested at his home by the DISIP and held incommunicado. Amnesty International denounced that Espinoza's family had been denied information about his detention.

On 23 October 1996, the DISIP arrested astrologer José Bernardo Gómez and held him incommunicado for 48 hours after he had predicted days earlier that President Rafael Caldera would die before completing his term. According to historian José Sant Roz, "27 vehicles were seized, 14 homes were searched, his phone calls were traced, and neighbors, relatives, and friends were interrogated."

=== Defense ===
The situation with the Armed Forces was delicate prior to Caldera's rise to power. The Minister of Defense under Ramón J. Velásquez's interim government, Radamés Muñoz León, remained in office until his resignation in January 1994. This came after Rafael Caldera announced the dismissal of the military high command following the failure of the two coup attempts on February 4 and November 27, 1992. According to the newspaper El Tiempo, "Caldera's decision was met with approval by political leaders".

=== Economics ===
==== Economic crisis ====
In the first year of his second presidency, Caldera was faced with a major financial crisis (Venezuelan banking crisis of 1994) that began with the failure of Banco Latino during the acting presidency of Ramón José Velásquez, continued with the failure of more than ten banks, and culminated with the loss of deposits. Money given by the government to the banks curtailed government spending in other areas, affecting thousands of people and creating a serious imbalance in the Venezuelan economy.

Although Caldera promised during his campaign never to accept the help of the International Monetary Fund, his government had to rescind the vow, due to the economic crisis and bad management. The effect of the interventionist practice on the economy of Venezuela caused Caldera to announce the Agenda Venezuela (Venezuela Agenda) programme, which promised to restore the macroeconomic balance and to beat inflation. He applied liberalization measures in agreement with the recommendations of the IMF that he had previously resisted. The bolívar was devalued by 70%, the exchange rate regime was imposed, fuel prices were increased by 800%, rates of interest were liberalized, and the process of privatization was continued. His program was welcomed by the IMF, but not by the country. Demonstrations and disturbances among the population were frequent.

Also during the second Caldera presidency, the process of Oil opening began with the purpose of increasing the involvement of the private sector, national and international, in the operation, exploration and refinement of petroleum and natural gas. The worldwide oil market crisis negatively influenced this process.

===== Fugitive bankers case =====
The Case of the Fugitive Bankers was a political scandal that took place in Venezuela in 1994 when several banks collapsed during the banking crisis of that year and their directors fled the country, among them Orlando Castro Llanes, Fernando Araújo, director of Banco Metropolitano, who was the son-in-law of the sitting president, Rafael Caldera, as well as Gustavo Gómez López of Banco Latino, José Bauza of Banco de Venezuela, and José Alvarez Sterling of Banco Consolidado.

The government of Rafael Caldera intervened in and nationalized 19 failed banking entities, granting them 7.5 billion dollars between 1994 and 1995 through the so-called “financial assistance” programs. Said bailout did not solve the banking crisis and resulted in an imbalance of public finances, which translated into a subsequent economic adjustment that caused social unrest. The bankers escaped without the justice system preventing it, which also generated criticism.

Fernando Araújo was convicted on several charges, among them the “diversion and fraudulent use of public funds”, which carried sentences of 2 to 10 years in prison.

The attorney general, Jesús Petit, accompanied New York prosecutor Robert Morgenthau when he announced the arrest and opening of fraud and theft proceedings against Orlando Castro Llanes, a Cuban banker, his son Orlando, and his grandson Jorge Castro. On 9 May 1996, Castro declared in a Florida court that he had financed Rafael Caldera with a check for 20 million bolívares for his presidential campaign. Castro also financed the campaign of Bill Clinton. In 1997, Vladimir Petit, deputy and son of Jesús Petit, admitted having received money from Castro for political activities “in the same way as other important Venezuelan and foreign politicians had done”.

==== Venezuela Agenda ====
The crisis of the financial system led to the departure of Minister Sosa Rodríguez from the Treasury portfolio; immediately afterward, the reorganization of the economic cabinet and the reformulation of economic policy to confront the crisis began. Luis Raúl Matos Azocar replaced Sosa and entered the Treasury Ministry on 7 February 1995.

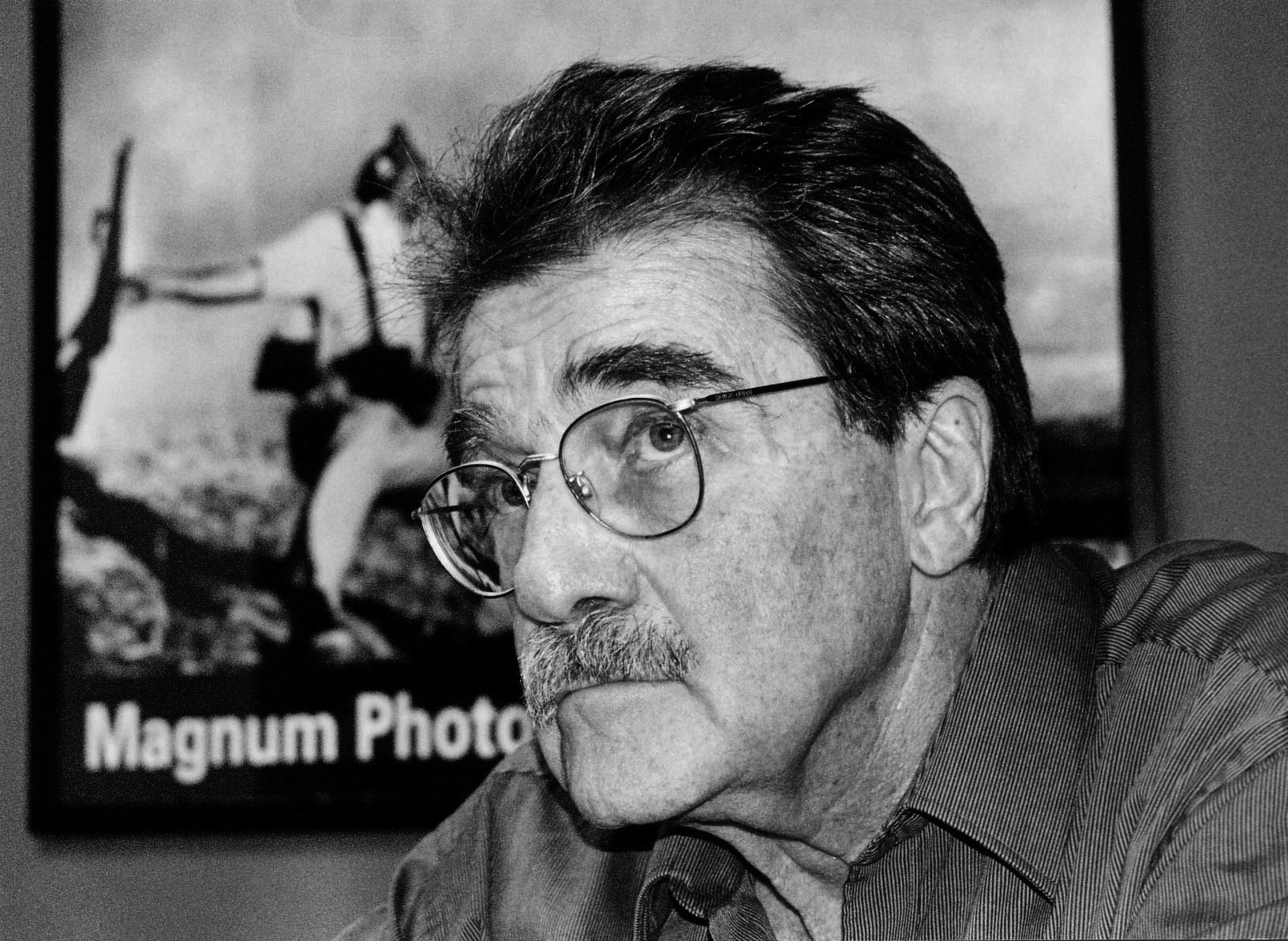
Teodoro Petkoff, Minister of Cordiplan (Planning), was the driving force behind the Venezuela Agenda, an adjustment program.

Faced with the failure of exchange controls and several measures intended to overcome the severity of the economic situation, fiscal imbalance, the decline in international reserves and rising inflation, the government decided to move forward with a new economic adjustment program, which was presented to the country as the Venezuela Agenda. In March 1996, economist Teodoro Petkoff, a former guerrilla fighter and former deputy, was appointed Minister of Cordiplan and promoted the economic program, assuring that it was not a neoliberal plan, but one of "common sense and social consensus". The intention of the plan was to reform the Venezuelan economy, encourage private initiative and eliminate exchange restrictions that had existed for years. The bolívar was devalued by 70%, an exchange rate regime was imposed, fuel prices were increased by 800%, interest rates were liberalized and the privatization process continued. The fiscal deficit forced Caldera's government to implement a severe austerity program that included a 10% cut in the federal budget in 1994 and a reform of fiscal legislation. Unlike Carlos Andrés Pérez's adjustment plan, Caldera's was successfully implemented.

In 1997, gross domestic product (GDP) grew by more than 55% and the inflation rate was cut in half. However, the Asian financial crisis of 1997 drove oil prices to very low levels, forcing the government to make major budget cuts. In 1997, Caldera's government privatized the Siderúrugica del Orinoco (Sidor).

===== Oil opening =====
During Caldera's second presidency, the process of Oil opening continued with the aim of increasing the participation of the private sector, both national and international, in the operation, exploration and refining of oil and natural gas. The global oil market crisis negatively affected this process. It caused a severe fiscal crisis; there was negative growth of (-0.11%). Despite this, by 1998 Venezuela had the highest international reserves in Latin America in proportion to GDP, around 15 billion dollars. In addition, debt was reduced from 26.981 billion in 1994 to 23.175 billion in 1999.

==== Economic indicators ====
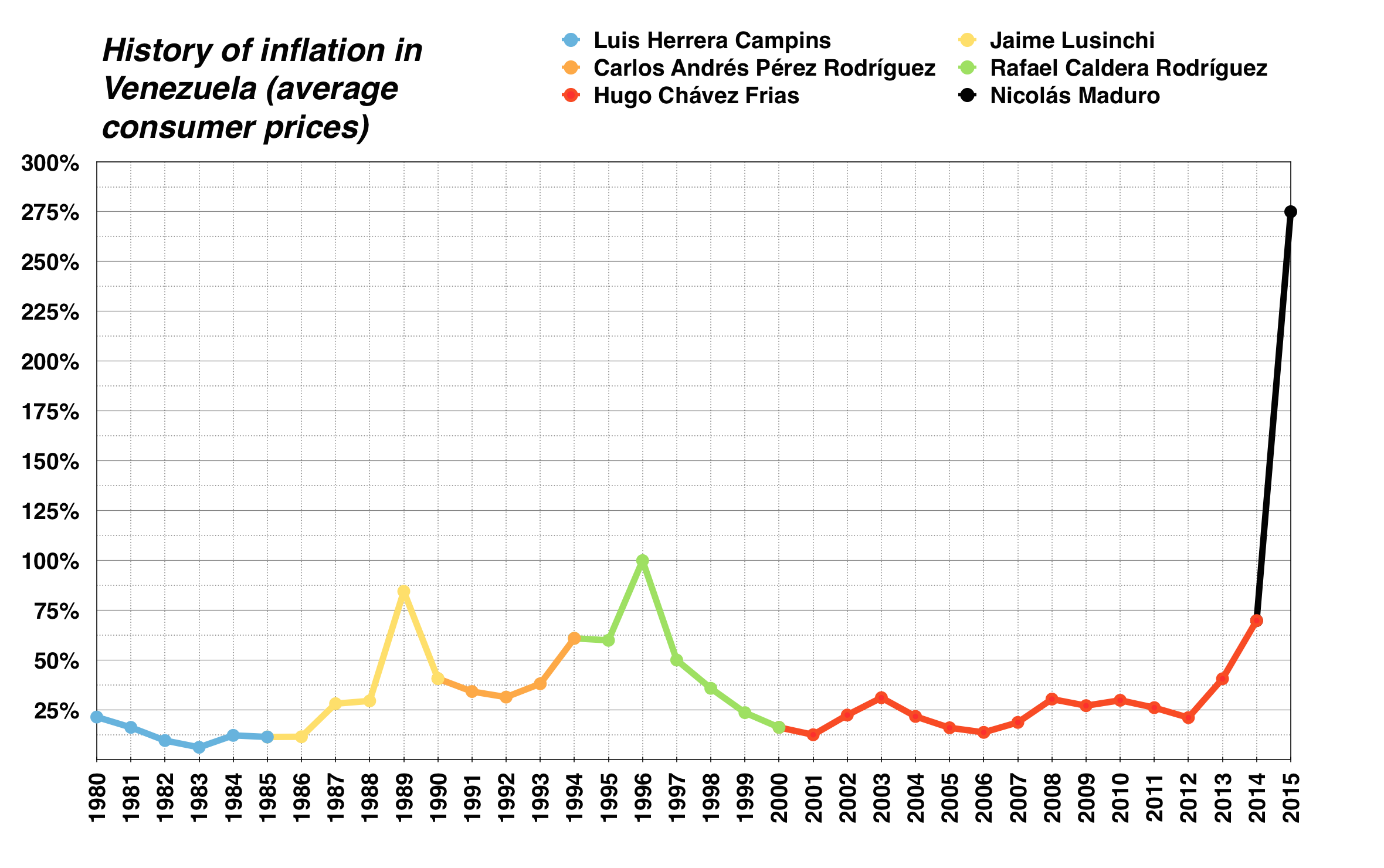
Inflation during Caldera's second government, in green.

Inflation
1994	1995	1996	1997	1998
60.8%	59.9%	99.9%	50%	35.8%

GDP growth
1994	1995	1996	1997	1998
-2.3%	4%	0.2%	6.4%	0.3%

=== Labor policy ===
From mid-1997 onward, the political climate was shaken by different labor conflicts. The prolonged strike by university professors kept higher education paralyzed for two months. The conflict involving employees of the Caracas Metro, the strike at CANTV, work stoppages by court employees, and salary demands from public sector workers occupied the attention of the government and public opinion. Weeks later, the Confederation of Venezuelan Workers (CTV) called for a "National Civic Strike" on 6 August with the aim of demanding that the business sector comply with the new national legislation.

In 1997, a Tripartite Commission composed of representatives of industrialists, workers and the Government was created. It undertook reform of the social security benefits system and sought to reach agreements for drafting a new labor statute, which was approved by Congress in July 1997.

=== Infrastructure ===
On 18 December 1994 Caldera inaugurated the Plaza Venezuela – El Valle section of the Caracas Metro which had been initiated by previous governments.

=== Human rights policy ===
During this government, harassment operations against venues frequented by members of the sexually diverse community continued. Several organizations denounced workplace discrimination and offensive rhetoric from some press outlets. In 1995, the homosexual José Luis Ortigoza was raped and tortured by police officers, leading him to seek refuge in Canada.

On 14 October 1997, the Law on Vagrants and Criminals was declared null and void by the court of justice; among the considerations for annulling it was that the law did not judge a crime and that "man is punished for what he is and not for what he does". Workers were also prohibited from being dismissed because of their sexual orientation.

=== Immigration ===
In 1994, President Caldera repealed Decree 1911, which stipulated the obligation to register the children of undocumented foreigners in national territory. After an attack by Colombian guerrillas on the Carabobo naval post, Interior Minister Ramón Escovar Salom declared a "national deportation plan and a census of foreigners to free Venezuela from undesirable foreigners"; one of these operations took place in Petare, where 167 Colombians defined as illegal were detained by the Cuerpo Técnico de Policía Judicial.

Caldera also presented a constitutional reform project that sought to eliminate from the constitution the right to Venezuelan nationality for the children of foreigners, but the proposal ultimately failed.

== Foreign policy ==
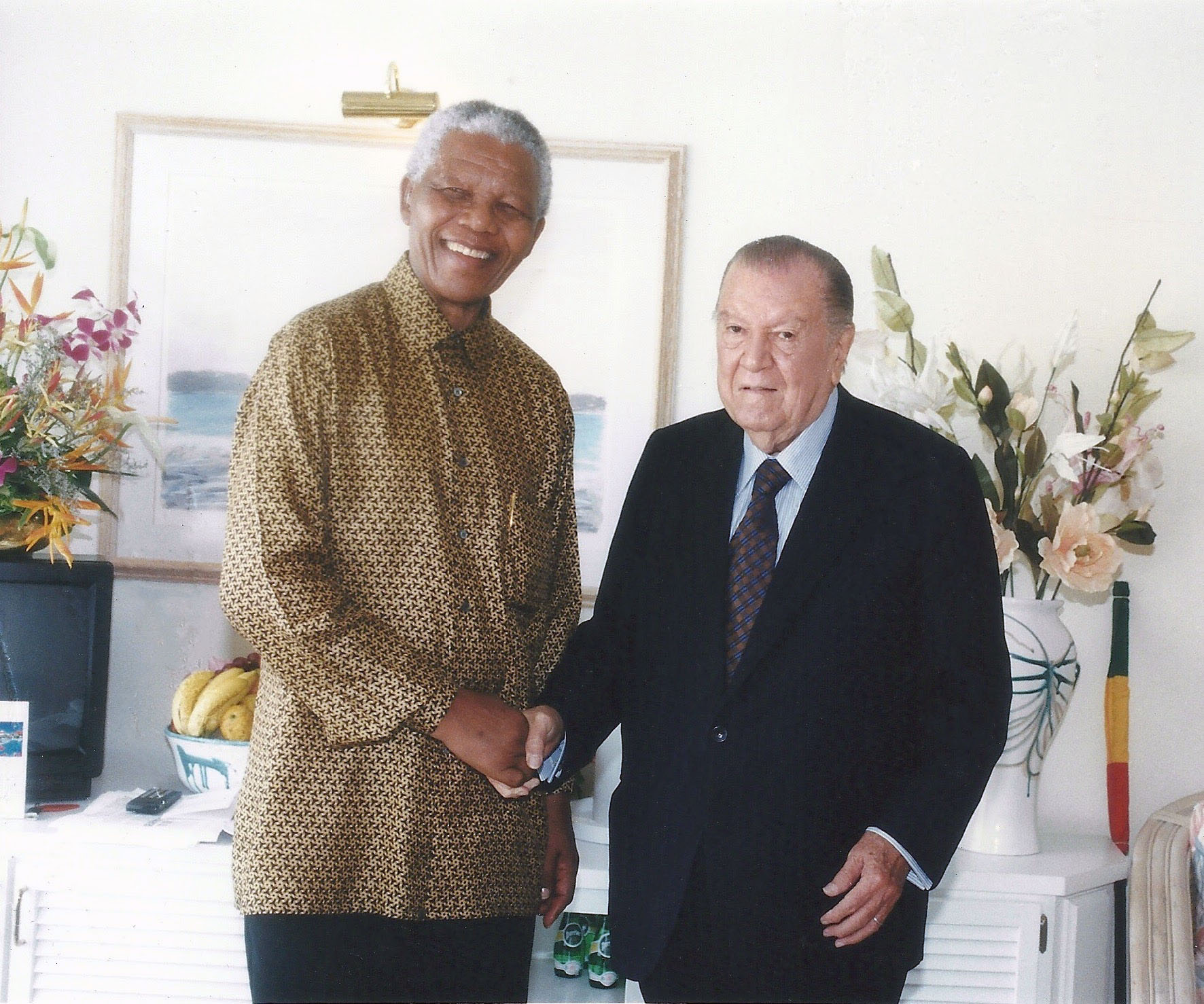
The president of South Africa, Nelson Mandela, and Rafael Caldera in Saint Lucia during the Caribbean Community (CARICOM) Assembly in 1998.

In 1996, Caldera received Pope John Paul II on his second visit to Venezuela, when he blessed the prisoners of the Catia Prison, on the west side of Caracas (After this visit, the building was demolished). On 12 October 1997 he received U.S. President Bill Clinton, in November of the same year Margarita Island hosted the Seventh Ibero-American Conference. In June 1998, the Inaugural meeting of the XXVIII General Assembly of the Organization of American States was held in Caracas.

=== International trips ===
The following list summarises the official foreign visits made by Caldera during his second term as President of Venezuela:

==== 1994 ====
Date	Place	Main purpose
9–11 December	Miami (United States)	1st Summit of the Americas.

==== 1995 ====
Date	Place	Main purpose
7 May	Rome (Italy)	Beatification of María de San José.
6 September	Bogotá (Colombia)	Meeting with President Ernesto Samper.

==== 1996 ====
Date	Place	Main purpose
25 September	Madrid (Spain)	

==== 1997 ====
Date	Place	Main purpose
5 February	(Mexico)	Signing of six cooperation agreements, including one to eliminate double taxation.

==== 1998 ====
Date	Place	Main purpose
20 March	Paris (France)	
20 April	(Peru)	Meeting with dictator Alberto Fujimori. Discussion on cooperation in the fight against drug trafficking and candidates for international organizations.
4 July	(Saint Lucia)	Assembly of the Caribbean Community (CARICOM).

== 1998 election ==
That election saw the comprehensive defeat of Acción Democrática and COPEI, which had alternated in government for 35 years (from 1959 to 1994), and which now lost their influence on the Venezuelan political scene.

== See also ==
- Interim government of Ramón J. Velásquez
- First presidency of Rafael Caldera
