= Rafael Montero Revette =

Venezuelan military officer

Rafael Ángel Montero Revette is a Venezuelan military officer who served as Minister of Defense between 1994 and 1995, during the final interim government of Ramón J. Velásquez and the beginning of the second government of Rafael Caldera.

== Biography ==
Montero was commander of the Army on the border with Colombia.

Following tensions between President Velásquez and Radamés Muñoz León, Caldera won the elections and announced that he would change the military leadership. Montero Revette was appointed new Minister of Defense by Ramón J. Velásquez and ratified by Rafael Caldera. He was responsible for preparing the dismissal for Hugo Chávez and 400 officers who participated in the February 1992 coup attempt. Chávez accused him of conspiring before the 1993 elections with Vice Admiral Radamés Muñoz León to carry out a coup d'état; Montero denied it.

In 2017, he issued a statement together with the Military Institutional Front, of which he is a member, declaring that "the constitutional thread has been broken" and asking the army to listen to the people.

In 2019, he published a document together with other retired FANB members requesting "extreme measures" from the president of the National Assembly, Juan Guaidó, considering "even military aid from an international coalition" valid.
