= List of ambassadors of Russia to Guyana =

Ambassador of the Russian Federation to the Co-operative Republic of Guyana
- Emblem of the Russian Foreign Ministry
- Incumbent; Andrey Printsepov since 17 June 2025
- Ministry of Foreign Affairs; Embassy of Russia in Georgetown
- Style: His Excellency
- Reports to: Minister of Foreign Affairs
- Seat: Georgetown
- Appointer: President of Russia
- Term length: At the pleasure of the president
- Website: Embassy of Russia in Guyana

The ambassador extraordinary and plenipotentiary of Russia to Guyana is the official representative of the president and the government of the Russian Federation to the president and the government of Guyana.

The ambassador and his staff work at large in the Embassy of Russia in Georgetown. The post of Russian ambassador to Guyana is currently held by Andrey Printsepov, incumbent since 17 June 2025. The ambassador to Guyana has historically had dual accreditation as the non-resident ambassador to Barbados, Grenada, Saint Vincent and the Grenadines, and Trinidad and Tobago. The current ambassador has, as of December 2025, only been accredited to Saint Vincent and the Grenadines, and Trinidad and Tobago, in addition to Guyana.

== History of diplomatic relations ==
Diplomatic relations between the Soviet Union and Guyana were established on 17 December 1970. Relations were initially handled through the Soviet embassy in Brazil, with the ambassador to Brazil, Sergey Mikhailov, appointed on 24 July 1970. The embassy in Georgetown was opened in 1976, and Vladimir Kotenyov was appointed as the first ambassador solely accredited to Guyana. With the dissolution of the Soviet Union, Guyana recognized the Russian Federation as its successor state. The incumbent Soviet ambassador, Mikhail Sobolev, continued as the Russian ambassador until 1995.

Relations between Russia and a number of other Central American states have been handled through the embassy in Guyana, with the ambassador to Guyana dually accredited to Trinidad and Tobago since 1991, to Saint Vincent and the Grenadines, and to Grenada, since 2007, and to Barbados since 2008.

== List of representatives (1970–present) ==
=== Soviet Union to Guyana (1970-1991) ===
Name	Title	Appointment	Termination	Notes
Sergey Mikhailov	Ambassador	24 July 1970	6 January 1975	Concurrently ambassador to Brazil; Credentials presented on 30 April 1971
Dmitry Zhukov	Ambassador	6 January 1975	23 February 1976	Concurrently ambassador to Brazil; Credentials presented on 20 February 1975
Vladimir Kotenyov	Ambassador	23 February 1976	5 March 1981	Credentials presented on 8 April 1976
Konstantin Kharchev	Ambassador	5 March 1981	30 December 1984	Credentials presented on 10 April 1981
Anatoly Ulanov	Ambassador	30 December 1984	14 July 1989	
Mikhail Sobolev	Ambassador	14 July 1989	25 December 1991	

=== Russian Federation to Guyana (1991-present) ===
Name	Title	Appointment	Termination	Notes
Mikhail Sobolev	Ambassador	25 December 1991	13 September 1995	
Takhir Durdyev	Ambassador	13 September 1995	5 May 1999	
Igor Prokopyev	Ambassador	5 May 1999	26 July 2002	
Vladimir Starikov	Ambassador	26 July 2002	27 July 2007	
Pavel Sergiyev	Ambassador	27 July 2007	21 February 2011	
Nikolai Smirnov	Ambassador	1 March 2011	6 December 2017	
Aleksandr Kurmaz	Ambassador	6 December 2017	17 June 2025	Credentials presented on 28 March 2018
Andrey Pritsepov	Ambassador	17 June 2025		Credentials presented on 6 August 2025
