= Interim government of Ramón J. Velásquez =

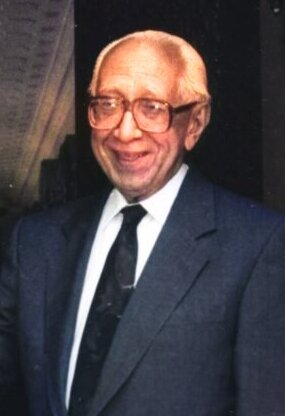
- Velásquez in 1993
- Presidency of Ramón J. Velásquez; June 5, 1993 – February 2, 1994
- Cabinet: See list
- Party: Acción Democrática
- Election: None
- Seat: Miraflores Palace
- Presidential Standard

The interim government of Ramón José Velásquez or the Presidency of Ramón José Velásquez refers to Ramón J. Velásquez’s tenure as the President of Venezuela which began on 5 June 1993 when he was appointed interim president by the Congress of Venezuela following the impeachment of President Carlos Andrés Pérez and the brief Interim government of Octavio Lepage. His presidency ended on 2 February 1994 when Rafael Caldera succeeded him. This marked the conclusion of the final eight months of Pérez's second term and the end of the political era known as Puntofijismo.

Velásquez's administration focused on a national decentralization project, which led to the creation of the Ministry of State for Decentralization. His government operated under an Enabling Act, which granted him legislative powers. Economically, his policies included suspending the privatization initiatives undertaken by Pérez's second administration and addressing the onset of the 1994 banking crisis.

His judicial policy included dismissals of those involved in the coup attempts of 1992 and was criticized for the scandal following the pardon of drug trafficker Larry Tovar Acuña, in which the president's signature was forged by his private secretary, who was later convicted.

Velásquez attempted to replace Defense Minister Radamés Muñoz and the entire military leadership for most of his presidency, succeeding only after the election of Rafael Caldera. His foreign policy emphasized Latin American integration, including agreements between Caribbean nations (Caricom) and the G-3.

== Background ==
After the Supreme Court requested Congress to impeach President Carlos Andrés Pérez, the then-president of Congress, Octavio Lepage, was appointed interim president. Lepage served for fifteen days, during which disagreements within Congress led to the appointment of Ramón J. Velásquez, a senator from the Democratic Action (AD) party representing the state of Táchira.

=== Assumption ===
On June 4, 1993, Congress elected Velásquez, aged 76, as constitutional president. The traditional parties Democratic Action and Copei decided to support Velásquez, though they did not contribute their own members to the ministerial cabinet, which was instead composed of independent figures.

== Decentralization Plan ==
Velásquez's central policy was a national decentralization project, for which he created the Intergovernmental Fund for Decentralization. In 1993, he established the Ministry of State for Decentralization.

== Domestic policy ==
=== Legislation ===
==== Enabling Act ====
Velásquez requested Congress to grant him an Enabling act, which was approved on August 23, 1993, allowing him to issue decree-laws to address the complex economic and political situation.

=== Justice ===
President Velásquez continued with the dismissals of those involved in the coup attempts against Carlos Andrés Pérez in 1992, dismissing Diosdado Cabello. On December 27, 1993, the Minister of the Secretariat, Ramón Espinoza, declared: "I can give you the assurance that Hugo Chávez, Arias Cárdenas, and other military and civilian defendants will be released before Rafael Caldera assumes the presidency."

==== Pardon of Larry Tovar Acuña ====
In October 1993, Velásquez's government was embroiled in the narco-pardon scandal, in which the interim president pardoned imprisoned drug trafficker Larry Tovar Acuña, a representative of the Medellín Cartel in Venezuela.

Velásquez later testified before the court that he had signed the document without reading it and was exonerated in 1995 in connection with the matter. His private secretary, María Auxiliadora Jara de Tarazona, was found guilty. The court handling the case stated: "It has been demonstrated that Jara used cunning to exploit the president's good faith, who granted the pardon improperly substantiated, and the error and deceit exclude any corrupt pact."

Jara was sentenced to three years in prison, and an extradition order was issued for Larry Tovar Acuña, who had fled to Colombia.

=== Defense ===
Defense Minister Radamés Muñoz León, along with military and civilian collaborators, traveled to Washington, D.C., to seek approval from the U.S. State Department and Department of Defense to overthrow Velásquez's transitional government, halt elections, and install an authoritarian regime. Velásquez attempted to replace Muñoz and the military leadership for most of his presidency, succeeding only after the election of Rafael Caldera.

Human Rights Watch reported allegations of links between police, military members, and drug trafficking, as well as suspicions that drug money was funding the 1993 presidential campaign. In August 1993, retired National Guard General Ramón Guillén Dávila and other officers, including National Guard General Orlando Hernández Villegas, head of the anti-drug unit, were arrested.

=== Economics ===
Velásquez's economic measures included implementing a value-added tax (IVA), restructuring income tax, and enacting the Business Assets Tax Law and the Consumer Protection Law, which delegated price control responsibilities to governors and mayors.

After Banco Latino, one of Venezuela's largest banks, became insolvent, Velásquez's government intervened, appointing a new board. This action triggered panic and a massive withdrawal of funds from the banking sector. The Ministry of Defense, which had entrusted most of its funds to Banco Latino, faced difficulties in paying its employees' salaries.

In November 1993, Velásquez suspended the privatization program initiated by the previous administration, freezing the sale of Aeropostal, a racetrack, two electric companies, a hotel, and a sugar mill.

=== Energy ===
==== 1993 Venezuelan blackout ====
The 1993 blackout was a widespread power outage caused by an accident at the Guri Dam. The blackout left three-quarters of Venezuela without electricity, affecting all major cities in the country.

=== Civil rights ===
In 1989, Sergio Rodríguez Yance, an activist with the NGO PROVEA, was detained for allegedly instigating the Caracazo protests. He was visited by an Amnesty International commission while in detention and later released. On September 23, 1993, Rodríguez Yance participated in a student march that turned violent. He died from a pellet wound during the protest, sparking demonstrations and condemnation from organizations like Amnesty International.

=== Infrastructure ===
The 1993 Las Tejerías Tragedy was an explosion and subsequent fire on September 28, 1993, at kilometer 57 of the Autopista Regional del Centro near Las Tejerías, Aragua, Venezuela. The explosion was caused by the accidental piercing of an underground gas pipeline during the installation of a new fiber-optic network. Official reports confirmed 42 deaths, 14 injuries, and significant damage to vehicles, with estimated damages of 73.7 million bolívars.

== Foreign policy ==
Velásquez's foreign policy emphasized Latin American integration, participating in meetings of the Andean Community and the Group of Three (G-3), as well as agreements between Caribbean nations (Caricom) and the G-3.

== 1993 Venezuelan general election ==
The 1993 Venezuelan general election was held on Sunday, 5 December 1993, alongside parliamentary elections, resulting in the victory of Rafael Caldera of the Convergence party. The election marked the first electoral defeat in 35 years of democracy for the traditional parties Democratic Action (AD) and COPEI.

=== Allegations of electoral fraud ===
Interim President Ramón J. Velásquez of Democratic Action (AD) praised the 1993 electoral process. However, parties such as Radical Cause, Convergence, and the Movimiento al Socialismo (MAS) alleged electoral fraud, partly because votes and tally sheets passed through military facilities at Fuerte Tiuna while being transported between polling stations and the Supreme Electoral Council (CSE). Rafael Caldera declared himself president before official results were released, citing private polling data. In states like Trujillo and Anzoátegui, approximately 110,000 votes were annulled, allowing AD and COPEI candidates to secure their elections. Additionally, sealed ballots, CSE stamps, and tally sheets (supposedly deposited in ballot boxes) were found in a Caracas school, leading to a formal complaint before Judge Mildred Camero.

Radical Cause candidate Andrés Velásquez, who received 21.95% of the vote, filed complaints over irregularities, claiming that his party's officials were barred from witnessing vote counts while AD and COPEI members were present at all polling centers. Andrés Caldera, the president's son, also filed a complaint with the Attorney General's Office. On 10 December 1993, protests involving cacerolazos erupted in working-class neighborhoods in northern and western Caracas.

Attorney General Ramón Escovar Salom initially urged the Supreme Electoral Council (CSE) to delay the certification of senators and deputies. Luis Alfaro Ucero, AD's secretary-general, stated: "AD is the only party that has not alleged fraud, but it also does not accept the accusations made by Caldera's party. It's nonsense; if they claim fraud, they should present evidence to the proper legal authorities."

== See also ==
- Interim government of Octavio Lepage
- Second presidency of Rafael Caldera
