= List of ambassadors of Russia to Trinidad and Tobago =

Ambassador of the Russian Federation to the Republic of Trinidad and Tobago
- Emblem of the Russian Foreign Ministry
- Incumbent; Andrey Printsepov since 8 August 2025
- Ministry of Foreign Affairs; Embassy of Russia in Georgetown
- Style: His Excellency
- Reports to: Minister of Foreign Affairs
- Seat: Georgetown
- Appointer: President of Russia
- Term length: At the pleasure of the president
- Website: Embassy of Russia in Guyana

The ambassador extraordinary and plenipotentiary of Russia to Trinidad and Tobago is the official representative of the president and the government of the Russian Federation to the president and the government of Trinidad and Tobago.

The ambassador and his staff work at large in the Embassy of Russia in Georgetown. The post of Russian ambassador to Trinidad and Tobago is currently held by Andrey Printsepov, incumbent since 8 August 2025. The ambassador is a non-resident diplomat who has dual accreditation as the ambassador to Guyana, as well as to Barbados, Grenada, and Saint Vincent and the Grenadines.

== History of diplomatic relations ==
Diplomatic relations between the Soviet Union and Trinidad and Tobago were established on 6 June 1974. Relations were initially handled through the Soviet embassy in Venezuela, with the ambassador to Venezuela, Vladimir Kazimirov, appointed on 19 April 1975. In 1991, about the time of the dissolution of the Soviet Union and the Russian Federation's recognition as its successor state, accreditation was transferred to the Russian embassy in Guyana, with the Russian ambassador to Guyana having dual accreditation as non-resident ambassador to Trinidad and Tobago.

== List of representatives (1975–present) ==
=== Soviet Union to Trinidad and Tobago (1975-1991) ===
Name	Title	Appointment	Termination	Notes
Vladimir Kazimirov	Ambassador	19 April 1975	14 July 1980	Concurrently ambassador to Venezuela; Credentials presented on 13 June 1975
Vaino Väljas	Ambassador	14 July 1980	28 April 1986	Concurrently ambassador to Venezuela; Credentials presented on 17 December 1980
Vladimir Goncharenko	Ambassador	1 June 1986	1991	Concurrently ambassador to Venezuela

=== Russian Federation to Trinidad and Tobago (1991-present) ===
Name	Title	Appointment	Termination	Notes
Mikhail Sobolev	Ambassador	1991	13 September 1995	Concurrently ambassador to Guyana
Takhir Durdyev	Ambassador	13 September 1995	5 May 1999	Concurrently ambassador to Guyana
Igor Prokopyev	Ambassador	5 May 1999	26 July 2002	Concurrently ambassador to Guyana
Vladimir Starikov	Ambassador	26 July 2002	27 July 2007	Concurrently ambassador to Guyana
Pavel Sergiyev	Ambassador	24 October 2007	21 February 2011	Concurrently ambassador to Guyana
Nikolai Smirnov	Ambassador	10 May 2011	6 December 2017	Concurrently ambassador to Guyana
Aleksandr Kurmaz	Ambassador	6 August 2018	17 June 2025	Concurrently ambassador to Guyana; Credentials presented on 8 October 2018
Andrey Printsepov	Ambassador	8 August 2025		Concurrently ambassador to Guyana
