= Ednan =

Ednan is a given name. Notable people with the name include:

- Ednan Agaev (born 1956), Soviet and Russian diplomat
- Ednan Karabayev (born 1953), Kyrgyzstan foreign minister
- Ednan Shahid, leader of The Post

== See also ==
- Edna (disambiguation)
