= Konstantin Kharchev =

Soviet and Russian politician, diplomat and ambassador

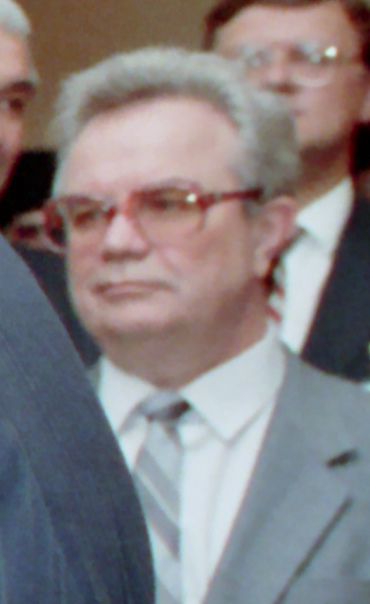
Kharchev in 1988

Konstantin Mikhailovich Kharchev (Russian: Константин Михайлович Харчев; born 1 May 1934) is a Soviet and Russian politician, diplomat and ambassador.

Kharchev was born in Gorky, in the Soviet Union, and from the age of three until just before finishing his seventh year of education in 1945, he was raised in a children's home.

In 1953, he graduated with distinction from the Riga Naval School, and in 1958 from the Vladimir High Engineering Naval School.

In 1967 he graduated from the Academy of Social Studies at the Central Committee of the Communist Party of the Soviet Union, where upon defending his dissertation he became a kandidat of Economic Sciences.

From 1978 to 1980, Kharchev studied at the Diplomatic Academy of the Ministry of Foreign Affairs of the Soviet Union. His first ambassadorial posting came in 1980, when he was appointed as Ambassador of the Soviet Union to Guyana. He served in the Guyanese capital Georgetown until 1984, when he returned to Moscow to become Chairman of the Council for Religious Affairs in the Council of Ministers. He was sacked from that job in June 1989.

His next ambassadorial posting came in 1990, when he was appointed as Ambassador of the Soviet Union to the United Arab Emirates, and after the dissolution of the Soviet Union he continued as Russian Ambassador in Abu Dhabi.

From 1993 to 1998 he worked in the central offices of the Russian Ministry of Foreign Affairs.

Kharchev is currently engaged in teaching at the Russian Academy of Justice, where he is a professor of International Law.
