= Mikhail Sobolev =

Russian diplomat (1937–2021)

- Михаил Соболев

Soviet Union Ambassador to Guyana
- In office 14 June 1989 – 26 December 1991
- President: Mikhail Gorbachev
- Preceded by: Anatoly Ulanov
- Succeeded by: position abolished

Soviet Union Ambassador to Trinidad and Tobago
- In office 14 June 1989 – 26 December 1991
- President: Mikhail Gorbachev
- Preceded by: Anatoly Ulanov
- Succeeded by: position abolished

Russia Ambassador to Guyana
- In office 26 December 1991 – 13 September 1995
- President: Boris Yeltsin
- Preceded by: position established
- Succeeded by: Takhir Durdyev

Russia Ambassador to Trinidad and Tobago
- In office 26 December 1991 – 13 September 1995
- President: Boris Yeltsin
- Preceded by: position established
- Succeeded by: Takhir Durdyev

Personal details
- Born: 8 September 1937
- Died: 12 November 2021 (aged 84)

Mikhail Sobolev (Russian: Михаи́л Арка́дьевич Со́болев; 8 September 1937 – 12 November 2021) was a Russian diplomat. He served as Ambassador of the Soviet Union and later Russia to Guyana and Trinidad and Tobago from 1989 to 1995.
