= Vladimir Petit =

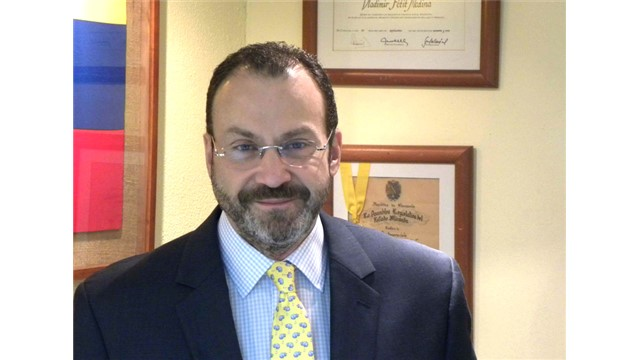
Vladimir Petit

Vladimir Petit Medina (February 9, 1963) is a Venezuelan former politician, who served as a deputy to Congress between 1989 and 1998 for the COPEI party.

== Biography ==
He is the son of former Venezuelan Attorney General Jesús Petit.

=== Political career ===
He was a member of COPEI's national committee until his resignation on December 8, 1998, and served as a principal deputy to the Congress of Venezuela between 1988 and 1998.

In 1997, Petit acknowledged in a press conference that he had received money from banker Orlando Castro Llanes, who was convicted of fraud in the United States.

=== Later life ===
He completed an advanced management program in 1996 and a master's degree in administration in 2022, both at the Instituto de Estudios Superiores de Administración (IESA).

In 2017, his passport was arbitrarily annulled along with that of his wife, Nitu Pérez Osuna, preventing them from leaving the country, according to a complaint filed by the Venezuelan Press and Society Institute. In 2020, he signed the Madrid Charter, and in 2022, he publicly opposed, along with 67 other individuals, United States President Joe Biden's relaxation of sanctions against Venezuela.

== Books ==
- Chávez y la perversión del ejército

== See also ==
- Fugitive bankers case
