= List of ambassadors of Russia to Suriname =

Ambassador of the Russian Federation to the Republic of Suriname
- Emblem of the Russian Foreign Ministry

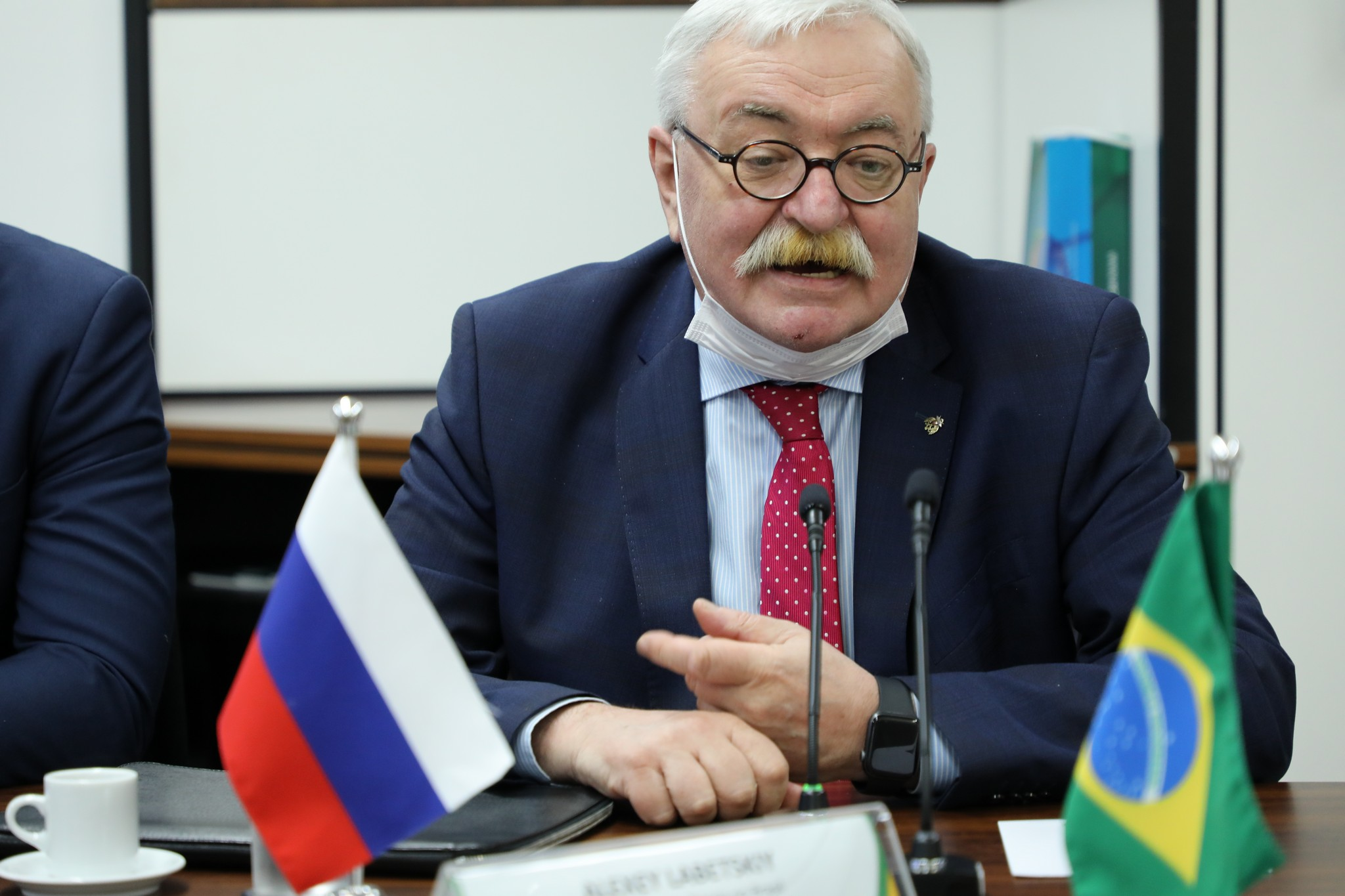
- Incumbent; Aleksey Labetsky since 26 February 2021
- Ministry of Foreign Affairs; Embassy of Russia in Brasília
- Style: His Excellency
- Reports to: Minister of Foreign Affairs
- Seat: Brasília
- Appointer: President of Russia
- Term length: At the pleasure of the president
- Website: Embassy of Russia in Brazil

The ambassador extraordinary and plenipotentiary of Russia to Suriname is the official representative of the president and the government of the Russian Federation to the president and the government of Suriname.

The ambassador and his staff work at large in the Embassy of Russia in Brasília. The post of Russian ambassador to Suriname is a non-resident ambassador who serves as the ambassador to Brazil. The post is currently held by Aleksey Labetsky, incumbent since 26 February 2021.

== History of diplomatic relations ==
Diplomatic relations between the Soviet Union and Suriname were first established on 25 November 1975, the day the country secured independence from the Netherlands. Relations were initially handled through the embassy in Colombia, with the ambassador to Colombia given dual accreditation to Suriname. The first ambassador, Vladimir Andreyev, was appointed on 29 November 1976. He was succeeded by Leonid Romanov, who served until the opening of the embassy in Paramaribo in April 1982. The first ambassador accredited solely to Suriname was Igor Bubnov, appointed on 22 July 1982. Ambassadors were exchanged up until the dissolution of the Soviet Union in 1991, with Suriname recognizing the Russian Federation as its successor state on 3 January 1992. The incumbent Soviet ambassador, Yury Dergausov, continued as the Russian ambassador until 1992. The embassy in Paramaribo was closed as part of cost-saving measures in 1995, and on 14 April 1995, the incumbent ambassador to Brazil, Iosif Podrazhanets, was given dual accreditation to Suriname, a practice which has since continued.

== List of representatives (1976–present) ==
=== Soviet Union to Suriname (1976-1991) ===
| Name | Title | Appointment | Termination | Notes |
|---|---|---|---|---|
| Vladimir Andreyev | Ambassador | 29 November 1976 | 23 August 1978 | Credentials presented on 20 January 1977; Concurrently ambassador to Colombia |
| Leonid Romanov | Ambassador | 23 August 1978 | 22 July 1982 | Credentials presented on 7 December 1978; Concurrently ambassador to Colombia |
| Igor Bubnov | Ambassador | 22 July 1982 | January 1989 | Credentials presented on 17 August 1982 |
| Yury Dergausov | Ambassador | 24 August 1989 | 25 December 1991 | |

=== Russian Federation to Suriname (1991-present) ===
| Name | Title | Appointment | Termination | Notes |
|---|---|---|---|---|
| Yury Dergausov | Ambassador | 25 December 1991 | 22 April 1992 | |
| Iosif Podrazhanets | Ambassador | 14 April 1995 | 17 April 1998 | Concurrently ambassador to Brazil |
| Vasily Gromov | Ambassador | 11 January 1999 | 15 July 2004 | Concurrently ambassador to Brazil |
| Vladimir Tyurdenev | Ambassador | 6 August 2004 | 23 November 2009 | Concurrently ambassador to Brazil |
| Sergei Akopov | Ambassador | 3 March 2010 | 21 January 2021 | Credentials presented on 23 November 2010; Concurrently ambassador to Brazil |
| Aleksey Labetsky | Ambassador | 26 February 2021 | | Concurrently ambassador to Brazil |
