= List of ambassadors of Russia to the Dominican Republic =

Ambassador of the Russian Federation to the Dominican Republic
- Посол Российской Федерации в Доминиканской Республике; Posol Rossiyskoy Federatsii v Dominikanskoy Respublike
- Emblem of the Russian Foreign Ministry
- Incumbent; Aleksey Seredin since 11 March 2025
- Ministry of Foreign Affairs; Embassy of Russia in Santo Domingo
- Style: Mr./Madam Ambassador (informal)
- Reports to: Minister of Foreign Affairs
- Seat: Santo Domingo
- Appointer: President of Russia
- Term length: At the pleasure of the president
- Website: dominicana.mid.ru (in Russian and Spanish)

The ambassador extraordinary and plenipotentiary of Russia to the Dominican Republic is the official representative of the president and the government of the Russian Federation to the president and the government of the Dominican Republic.

The ambassador and his staff work at large in the Embassy of Russia in Santo Domingo. The post of Russian ambassador to the Dominican Republic is currently held by Aleksey Seredin, incumbent since 11 March 2025.

== History of diplomatic relations ==
Relations between the Soviet Union and the Dominican Republic were first established on 8 March 1945. It was not until March 1991, that the two countries agreed to exchange ambassadors, with the incumbent ambassador to Venezuela given dual accreditation to the Dominican Republic. With the dissolution of the Soviet Union, the Dominican Republic recognized the Russian Federation as its successor state on 15 May 1992. The incumbent Soviet ambassador, Vladimir Goncharenko, continued as the Russian ambassador until 1992. The practice of the ambassador to Venezuela having dual accreditation to the Dominican Republic came to an end with the appointment of Aleksey Seredin on 11 March 2025, as the first ambassador solely accredited to the Dominican Republic.

== List of representatives (1991–present) ==
=== Soviet Union to the Dominican Republic (1991) ===
Name	Title	Appointment	Termination	Notes
Vladimir Goncharenko	Ambassador	15 February 1991	25 December 1991	Concurrently ambassador to Venezuela

=== Russian Federation to the Dominican Republic (1991-present) ===
Name	Title	Appointment	Termination	Notes
Vladimir Goncharenko	Ambassador	25 December 1991	24 January 1992	Concurrently ambassador to Venezuela
Nikolai Yelizarov	Ambassador	24 January 1992	25 August 1997	Concurrently ambassador to Venezuela
Valery Morozov	Ambassador	25 August 1997	12 August 2000	Concurrently ambassador to Venezuela
Aleksey Yermakov	Ambassador	27 October 2000	11 November 2004	Concurrently ambassador to Venezuela
Mikhail Orlovets	Ambassador	11 November 2004	23 June 2009	Concurrently ambassador to Venezuela
Vladimir Zayemsky	Ambassador	23 June 2009	17 February 2020	Concurrently ambassador to Venezuela
Sergey Melik-Bagdasarov	Ambassador	17 February 2020	11 March 2025	Concurrently ambassador to Venezuela; Credentials presented on 1 March 2021
Aleksey Seredin	Ambassador	11 March 2025		Credentials presented on 29 May 2025
