= List of ambassadors of Russia to the United Arab Emirates =

Ambassador of the Russian Federation to the United Arab Emirates
- سفير الاتحاد الروسي لدى الإمارات العربية المتحدة
- Emblem of the Russian Foreign Ministry
- Incumbent; Timur Zabirov
- Ministry of Foreign Affairs; Embassy of Russia in Abu Dhabi
- Style: His Excellency; The Honourable
- Reports to: Minister of Foreign Affairs
- Seat: Abu Dhabi
- Appointer: President of Russia
- Term length: At the pleasure of the president
- Formation: 1986
- First holder: Feliks Fedotov
- Website: Embassy of Russia in Abu Dhabi

The ambassador extraordinary and plenipotentiary of the Russian Federation to the United Arab Emirates is the official representative of the president and the government of the Russian Federation to the president and the government of the United Arab Emirates.

The ambassador and his staff work at large in the Embassy of Russia in Abu Dhabi. There is a consulate general in Dubai, and a trade mission in the country.

The post of Russian ambassador to the United Arab Emirates is currently held by Timur Zabirov, incumbent since 30 August 2021.

== History of diplomatic relations ==
Diplomatic relations between the Soviet Union and the United Arab Emirates were first established in December 1971. However embassies were not established, nor ambassadors accredited, until 1986. Feliks Fedotov was the first ambassador, assigned to the post on 24 September 1986, and serving until 11 September 1990. His successor, Konstantin Kharchev, was the sitting ambassador during the dissolution of the Soviet Union in 1991, and continued as representative of the Russian Federation until 15 August 1992.

== List of representatives (1986–present) ==
=== Soviet Union to the United Arab Emirates (1986–1991) ===
Name	Title	Appointment	Termination	Notes
Feliks Fedotov	Ambassador	24 September 1986	11 September 1990	
Konstantin Kharchev	Ambassador	11 September 1990	25 December 1991	

=== Russian Federation to the United Arab Emirates (1991–present) ===
Name	Title	Appointment	Termination	Notes
Konstantin Kharchev	Ambassador	25 December 1991	15 August 1992	
Oleg Derkovsky	Ambassador	15 August 1992	30 January 1998	
Sergei Kirpichenko	Ambassador	30 January 1998	30 November 2000	
Sergei Yakovlev	Ambassador	30 November 2000	3 March 2006	
Andrey Zakharov	Ambassador	3 March 2006	13 December 2008	
Andrey Andreyev	Ambassador	23 July 2009	16 April 2013	
Aleksandr Yefimov	Ambassador	16 April 2013	11 October 2018	
Sergei Kuznetsov	Ambassador	4 April 2019	16 January 2021	
Timur Zabirov	Ambassador	30 August 2021		
