= Interim government of Octavio Lepage =

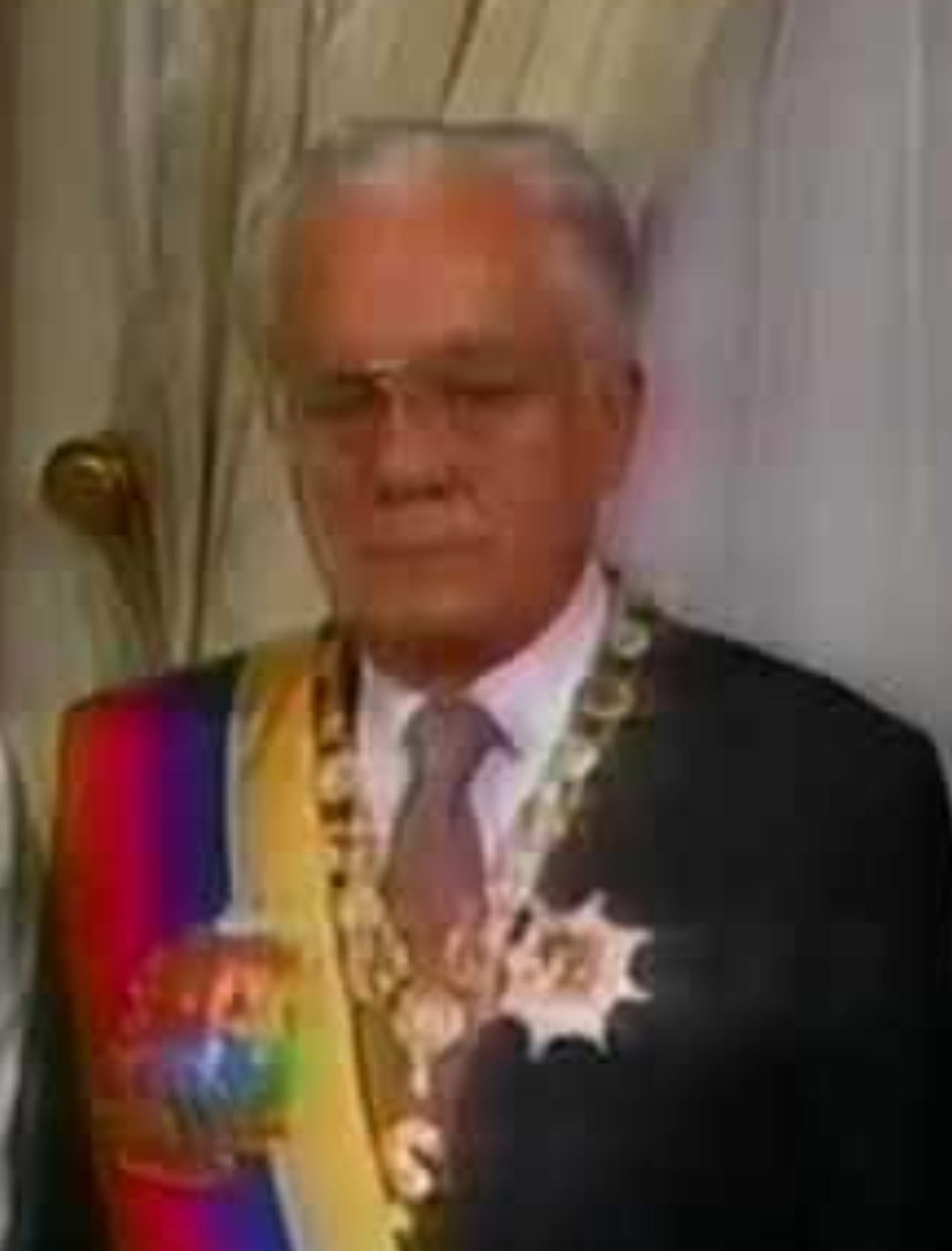
- Acting Presidency of Octavio Lepage; May 21, 1993 – June 5, 1993
- Cabinet: See list
- Party: Acción Democrática
- Election: None
- Seat: Miraflores Palace
- Presidential Standard

The interim government of Octavio Lepage or the Acting Presidency of Octavio Lepage refers to Octavio Lepage’s tenure as the Acting President of Venezuela which lasted fifteen days, from May 21 to June 5, 1993. Lepage was appointed interim president by the Congress of Venezuela due to the impeachment process of Carlos Andrés Pérez.

Senator Octavio Lepage was president of Congress for the Democratic Action (AD) party and had competed with Carlos Andrés Pérez in the primaries for the AD candidacy in the 1988 presidential elections. His was the first of two interim governments to be designated by the AD-majority Congress to finish Pérez's five-year term, an unprecedented process in Venezuelan democracy.

== Background ==
Octavio Lepage had served as Minister of Interior under Jaime Lusinchi between 1986 and 1988 and later as a presidential pre-candidate for Democratic Action (AD), supported by Lusinchi, losing to Carlos Andrés Pérez.

After the Supreme Court requested Congress to impeach President Carlos Andrés Pérez, and Pérez failed to appoint a minister for his replacement, the then-president of Congress, Octavio Lepage, was appointed interim president, assuming office without a clear end date.

== Cabinet ==
Lepage's cabinet was a continuation of the final cabinet of Carlos Andrés Pérez's second presidency. Lepage had intended to appoint a different cabinet if his mandate had been extended.

== Domestic policy ==
Lepage stated that his three priorities as president would be:

First: to foster a great national understanding among the fundamental political forces and certain highly influential sectors, such as production organizations, professional associations, labor unions, and the Church. It is essential that we come to an agreement. This could be reflected in the cabinet, unless my presence is very brief; in that case, it wouldn't make much sense. With the December elections so close, I don't think any party would agree to join a cabinet at such a critical and controversial moment.

(...)

Second, there is collective anguish due to the ongoing deterioration of personal security. This must be addressed. Until now, it's not that previous governments haven't confronted it, but the plans they implemented have not yielded many positive results. I don't have any plans yet, but I am aware that we need to bring together those with the most experience to begin taking at least gradual measures to confront this phenomenon more forcefully.

Third, there is the economic issue. We are facing difficulties. We need to review the policies that have been implemented to determine which ones should be maintained and which should not. And an evaluation must be carried out. The mistake was made, or rather it was inadvisable, to give this set of measures inspired by neoliberalism a very dogmatic character. Neither the economic reality, nor the national character, nor the prevailing model of democracy were sufficiently taken into account. President Pérez did not reach that stage of self-criticism which I believe must now be raised.

Lepage's presidency lasted fifteen days, generating dissension in Congress that favored the designation of Ramón J. Velásquez, a senator from the Democratic Action party representing Táchira State.

== See also ==
- Second presidency of Carlos Andrés Pérez
- Interim government of Ramón J. Velásquez
