= List of ambassadors of Russia to Venezuela =

Ambassador of the Russian Federation to the Bolivarian Republic of Venezuela
- Emblem of the Russian Foreign Ministry
- Incumbent; Sergey Melik-Bagdasarov since 17 February 2020
- Ministry of Foreign Affairs; Embassy of Russia in Caracas
- Style: His Excellency
- Reports to: Minister of Foreign Affairs
- Seat: Caracas
- Appointer: President of Russia
- Term length: At the pleasure of the president
- Website: Embassy of Russia in Venezuela

The ambassador extraordinary and plenipotentiary of Russia to Venezuela is the official representative of the president and the government of the Russian Federation to the president and the government of Venezuela.

The ambassador and his staff work at large in the Embassy of Russia in Caracas. The post of Russian ambassador to Venezuela is currently held by Sergey Melik-Bagdasarov, incumbent since 17 February 2020. The ambassador to Venezuela has dual accreditation as the non-resident ambassador to Haiti.

== History of diplomatic relations ==
Relations between the forerunner states of the modern countries of Russia and Venezuela date back to the mid-nineteenth century, with Venezuela being the first Latin American country whose independence was recognized by the Russian Empire, on 17 February 1857. Official diplomatic relations were established on 14 March 1945, during the period of the Soviet Union. The first ambassador, Foma Trebin, was appointed on 28 July 1945. Relations were however broken off by the Soviet Union on 13 June 1952, in protest against the anti-left wing policies of the military junta in the run-up to the 1952 Venezuelan Constituent Assembly election. They remained broken for the next eighteen years, during the presidency of Rómulo Betancourt, and the operation of the Betancourt Doctrine, which only recognised governments elected democratically. Relations were only restored on 16 April 1970, during the first presidency of Rafael Caldera, which saw the reversion of the Betancourt Doctrine, and the reopening of relations with socialist states. Viktor Likhachyov became the new ambassador, appointed on 2 October 1970. Representation continued through the late twentieth century. With the dissolution of the Soviet Union, Venezuela recognized the Russian Federation as its successor state The incumbent Soviet ambassador, Vladimir Goncharenko, continued as the Russian ambassador until 1992.

Diplomatic relations were established with the Dominican Republic towards the very end of the Soviet period, in 1991, and with Haiti in 1995. In both cases, the Russian ambassador to Venezuela was given dual accreditation to them. The practice of the ambassador to Venezuela having dual accreditation to the Dominican Republic came to an end with the appointment of Aleksey Seredin on 11 March 2025, as the first ambassador solely accredited to the Dominican Republic.

== List of representatives (1945–present) ==
=== Soviet Union to Venezuela (1945-1991) ===
Name	Title	Appointment	Termination	Notes
Foma Trebin	Ambassador	28 July 1945	25 March 1950	Credentials presented on 21 February 1946
Diplomatic relations interrupted (1952-1970)
Viktor Likhachyov	Ambassador	2 October 1970	19 April 1975	Credentials presented on 1 March 1971
Vladimir Kazimirov	Ambassador	19 April 1975	14 July 1980	Credentials presented on 9 June 1975
Vaino Väljas	Ambassador	14 July 1980	28 April 1986	Credentials presented on 13 September 1980
Vladimir Goncharenko	Ambassador	1 August 1986	25 December 1991	

=== Russian Federation to Venezuela (1991-present) ===
Name	Title	Appointment	Termination	Notes
Vladimir Goncharenko	Ambassador	25 December 1991	24 January 1992	
Nikolai Yelizarov	Ambassador	24 January 1992	25 August 1997	
Valery Morozov	Ambassador	25 August 1997	12 August 2000	
Aleksey Yermakov	Ambassador	22 August 2000	11 November 2004	
Mikhail Orlovets	Ambassador	11 November 2004	23 June 2009	
Vladimir Zayemsky	Ambassador	23 June 2009	17 February 2020	Credentials presented in September 2009
Sergey Melik-Bagdasarov	Ambassador	17 February 2020		Credentials presented on 30 March 2020
