= List of ambassadors of Russia to Colombia =

Ambassador of the Russian Federation to the Republic of Colombia
- Emblem of the Russian Foreign Ministry

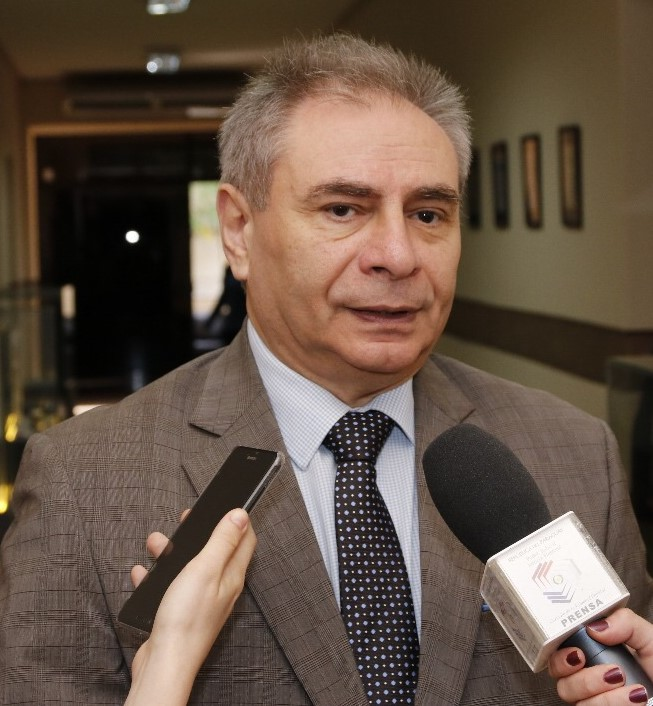
- Incumbent; Nikolai Tavdumadze since 5 October 2020
- Ministry of Foreign Affairs; Embassy of Russia in Bogotá
- Style: His Excellency
- Reports to: Minister of Foreign Affairs
- Seat: Bogotá
- Appointer: President of Russia
- Term length: At the pleasure of the president
- Website: Embassy of Russia in Colombia

The ambassador extraordinary and plenipotentiary of Russia to Colombia is the official representative of the president and the government of the Russian Federation to the president and the government of Colombia.

The ambassador and his staff work at large in the Embassy of Russia in Bogotá. The post of Russian ambassador to Colombia is currently held by Nikolai Tavdumadze, incumbent since 5 October 2020.

== History of diplomatic relations ==
Diplomatic relations between the forerunner states of the modern countries of Russia and Colombia date back to the mid-nineteenth century. Relations were first formalized through an exchange of diplomatic messages between Emperor Alexander II, and the president of the Republic of New Granada, Mariano Ospina Rodríguez, in 1858. Relations were restored between what was by then the Soviet Union and the Republic of Colombia on 25 June 1935. It was however not until February 1943, that a diplomatic mission was opened, and 21 October 1943, that the first envoy, Grigory Rezanov, was appointed. Relations were interrupted following the Bogotazo, an outbreak of political violence, in April 1948. The Colombian government broke off relations with the Soviet Union as a result. They were only restored on 19 January 1968, with Nikolai Belous appointed ambassador on 11 March 1968. Ambassadors were then exchanged for the remainder of the existence of the Soviet Union.

Diplomatic relations were established between the Soviet Union and Suriname on 25 November 1975. Relations were initially handled through the Soviet embassy in Colombia, with the incumbent ambassador to Colombia, Vladimir Andreyev, given dual accreditation as the non-resident ambassador to Suriname from 29 November 1976. This practice continued with Andreyev's successor, Leonid Romanov, and lasted until the opening of the embassy in Paramaribo on 27 October 1981, and the appointment of Igor Bubnov as the first ambassador accredited solely to Suriname from 22 July 1982.

Representation continued through the late twentieth century. With the dissolution of the Soviet Union, Colombia recognized the Russian Federation as its successor state on 27 December 1991. The incumbent Soviet ambassador, Igor Bubnov, continued as the Russian ambassador until 1992.

== List of representatives (1943–present) ==
=== Soviet Union to Colombia (1943-1991) ===
Name	Title	Appointment	Termination	Notes
Grigory Rezanov	Envoy	21 October 1943	3 May 1948	Credentials presented on 16 February 1944
Bogotazo and subsequent political unrest - Diplomatic relations interrupted (1948-1968)
Nikolai Belous	Ambassador	11 March 1968	29 July 1971	Credentials presented on 25 May 1968
Vladimir Andreyev	Ambassador	29 July 1971	23 August 1978	Credentials presented on 24 September 1971
Leonid Romanov	Ambassador	23 August 1978	23 June 1987	Credentials presented on 23 October 1978
Valery Nikolayenko	Ambassador	23 June 1987	27 January 1989	
Igor Bubnov	Ambassador	27 January 1989	25 December 1991	

=== Russian Federation to Colombia (1991-present) ===
Name	Title	Appointment	Termination	Notes
Igor Bubnov	Ambassador	25 December 1991	31 December 1992	
Viktor Smolin	Ambassador	31 December 1992	3 March 1994	
Ednan Agaev	Ambassador	23 August 1994	23 July 1999	
Vitaly Makarov	Ambassador	23 July 1999	26 February 2003	
Yury Korchagin	Ambassador	26 February 2003	24 June 2004	
Vladimir Trukhanovsky	Ambassador	24 June 2004	21 February 2011	
Pavel Sergiyev	Ambassador	21 February 2011	17 August 2016	
Sergey Koshkin	Ambassador	17 August 2016	5 October 2020	
Nikolai Tavdumadze	Ambassador	5 October 2020		Credentials presented on 29 January 2021
