= List of ambassadors of Russia to Argentina =

Ambassador of the Russian Federation to the Argentine Republic
- Emblem of the Russian Foreign Ministry

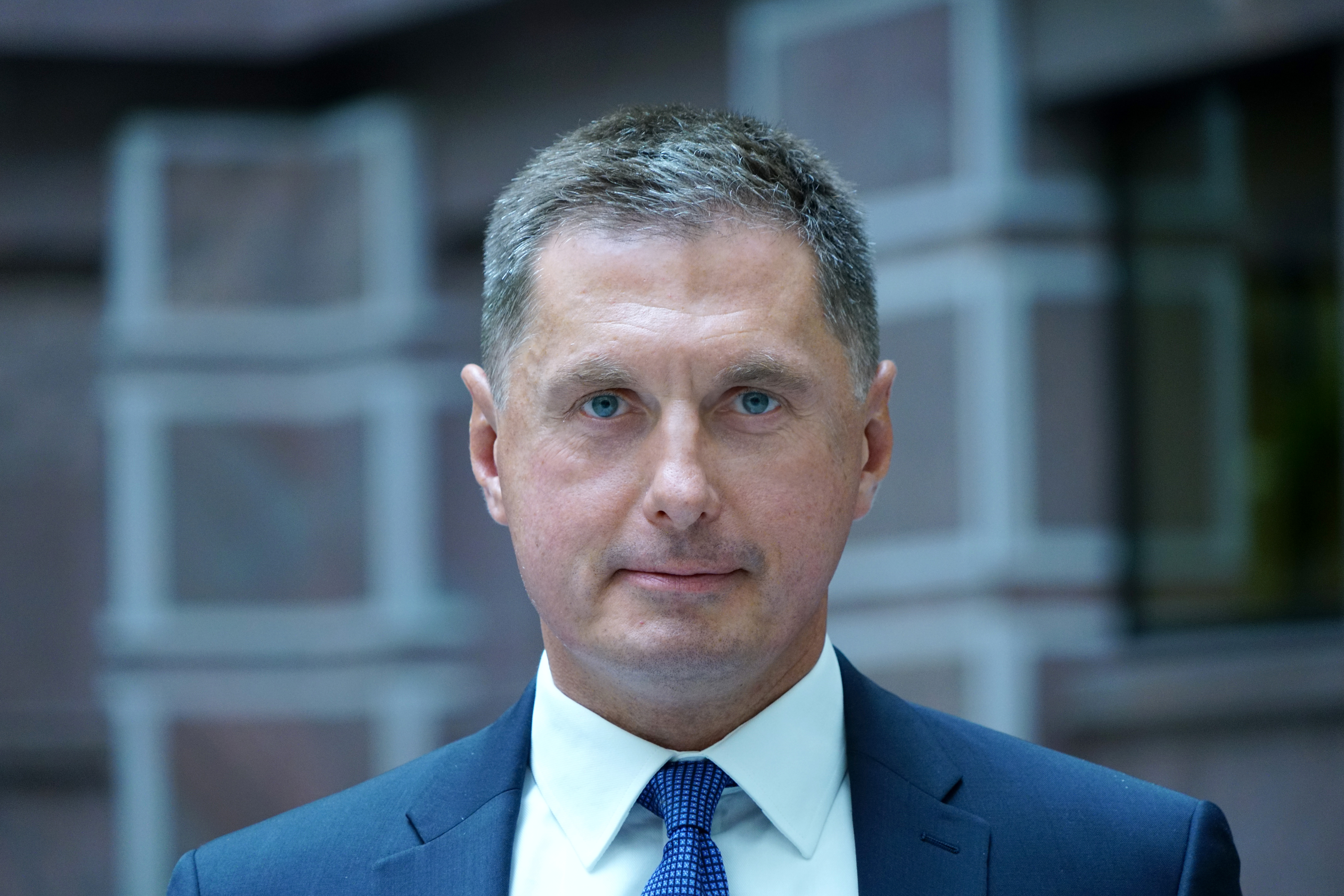
- Incumbent; Dmitry Feoktistov since 20 June 2018
- Ministry of Foreign Affairs; Embassy of Russia in Buenos Aires
- Style: His Excellency; The Honourable
- Reports to: Minister of Foreign Affairs
- Seat: Buenos Aires
- Appointer: President of Russia
- Term length: At the pleasure of the president
- Website: Embassy of Russia in Argentina

The ambassador extraordinary and plenipotentiary of the Russian Federation to the Argentine Republic is the official representative of the president and the government of the Russian Federation to the president and the government of Argentina.

The ambassador and his staff work at large in the Embassy of Russia in Buenos Aires. The post of Russian ambassador to Argentina is currently held by Dmitry Feoktistov, incumbent since 20 June 2018.

== History of diplomatic relations ==
The Russian Empire maintained consulates in Argentina during the early twentieth century. These represented Russian interests in the country until 1909, after which relations were maintained through the embassy in Brazil, with Yevgeny Shtein acting as charge d'affaires. Shtein was appointed the first envoy to Argentina in 1916, and continued after the February Revolution in 1917 as representative of the Russian Provisional Government. After the Bolshevik seizure of power in the October Revolution that year, Shtein's accreditation was revoked on 26 November 1917. The Argentine government continued to recognize him as the Russian envoy however, and he functioned in this role into the 1930s, during which there was no official representation from the USSR.

Official relations between the Soviet Union and the Argentine Republic were established in June 1946, with the first ambassador, Mikhail Sergeyev, appointed on 12 July 1946, and presenting his credentials on 12 September that year. With the dissolution of the Soviet Union in 1991, the Soviet ambassador, Vladimir Nikitin, continued as representative of the Russian Federation until 1993.

== List of representatives ==
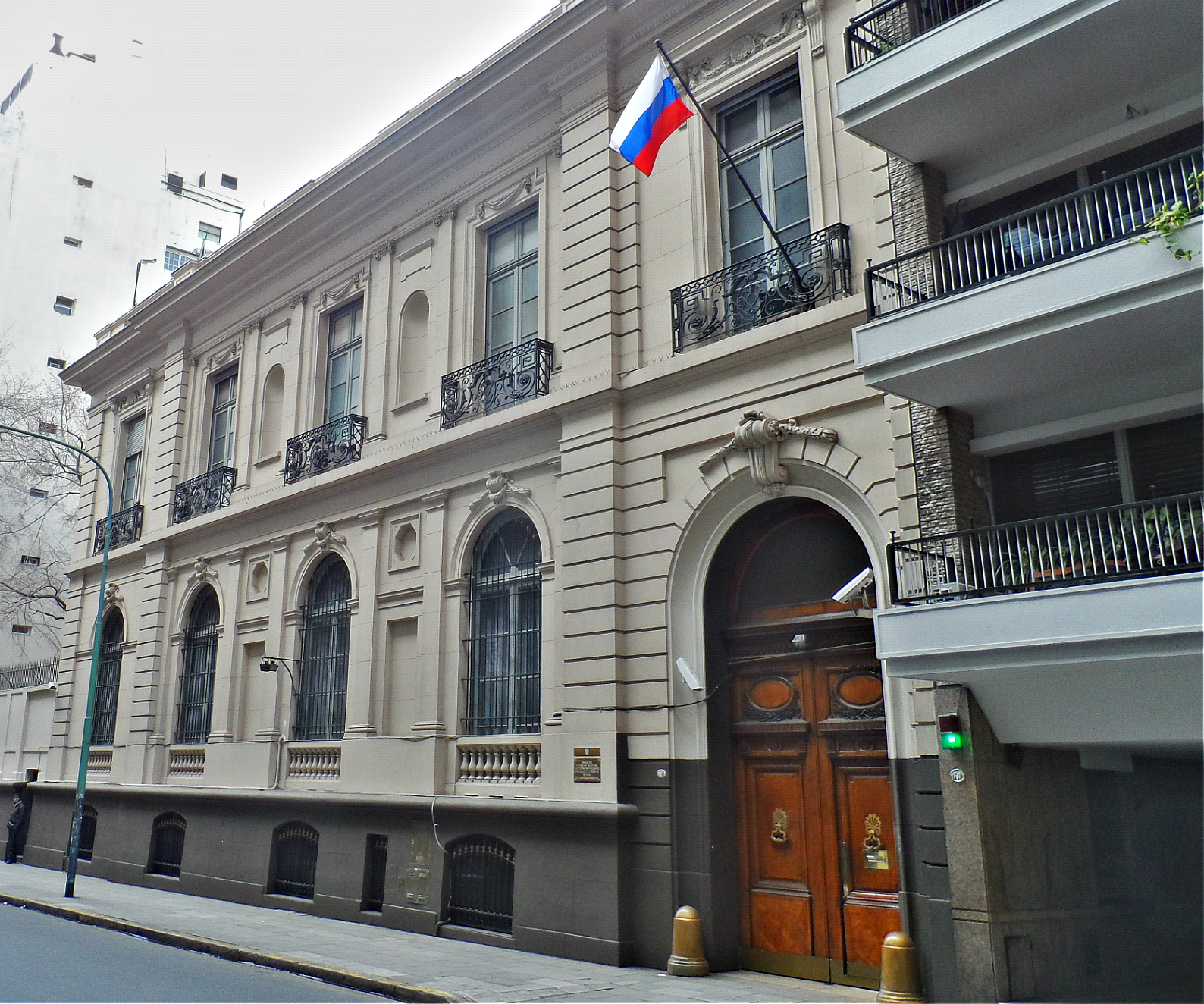
The Embassy of Russia in Buenos Aires

=== Russian Empire to Argentina (1900–1917) ===
Name	Title	Appointment	Termination	Notes
Alexey Shpeyer	Consul	1900	1904	
Mavriky Prozor	Consul	1905	1909	
Yevgeny Shtein	Consul	1909	1917	Charge d'affaires in Brazil prior to 1916

=== Soviet Union to Argentina (1946–1991) ===
Name	Title	Appointment	Termination	Notes
Mikhail Sergeyev	Ambassador	12 July 1946	1 June 1948	
Grigory Rezanov	Ambassador	25 November 1950	10 November 1956	
Mikhail Kostylyov	Ambassador	10 November 1956	10 November 1959	
Nikolai Alekseyev	Ambassador	10 November 1959	5 April 1966	
Yury Volsky	Ambassador	5 April 1966	14 October 1972	
Semyon Dyukarev	Ambassador	14 October 1972	27 September 1978	
Sergey Striganov	Ambassador	27 September 1978	17 June 1983	
Oleg Kvasov	Ambassador	17 June 1983	23 August 1990	
Vladimir Nikitin	Ambassador	23 August 1990	25 December 1991	

=== Russian Federation to Argentina (1991–present) ===
Name	Title	Appointment	Termination	Notes
Vladimir Nikitin	Ambassador	25 December 1991	22 June 1993	
Yan Burlyai	Ambassador	22 June 1993	8 June 1996	
Vladimir Tyurdenev	Ambassador	8 June 1996	22 August 2000	
Yevgeny Astakhov	Ambassador	22 August 2000	13 June 2004	
Yury Korchagin	Ambassador	13 July 2004	7 July 2009	
Aleksandr Dogadin	Ambassador	7 July 2009	6 December 2010	
Viktor Koronelli	Ambassador	21 July 2011	20 June 2018	
Dmitry Feoktistov	Ambassador	20 June 2018		
