= Andrés Caldera =

Venezuelan lawyer and politician

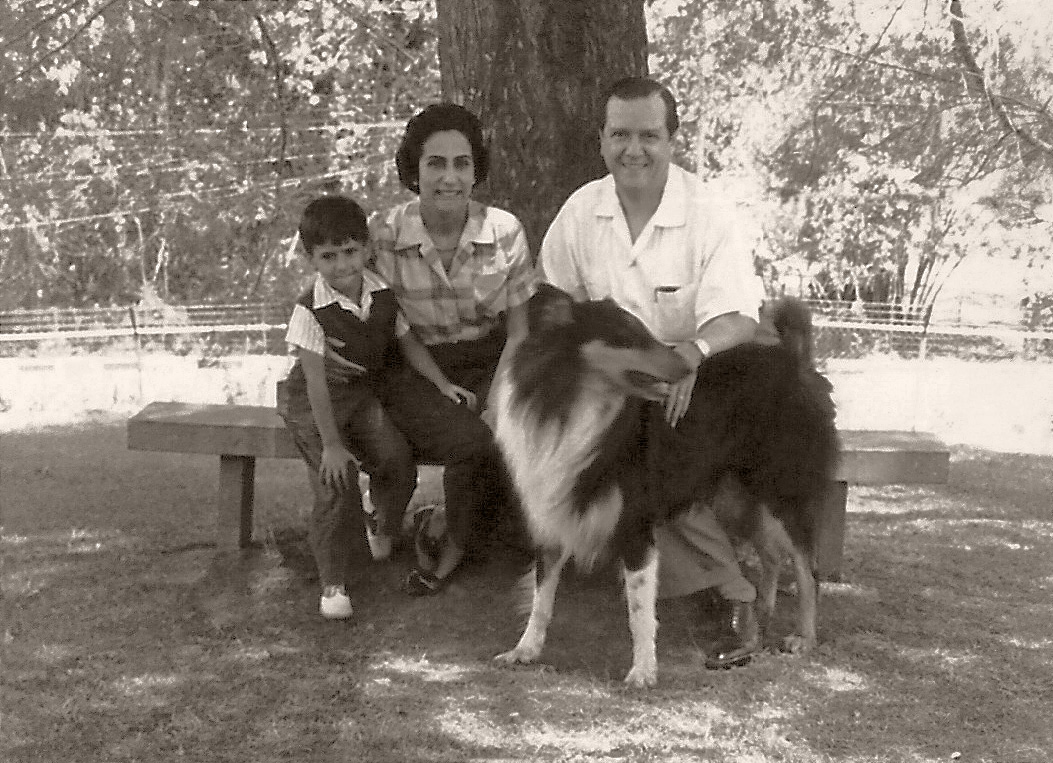
- Andrés Caldera (left) as a child in 1959

Secretary of the Presidency of Venezuela
- In office 1994–1996
- President: Rafael Caldera

Personal details
- Born: 27 November 1954 (age 71) Caracas, Venezuela
- Party: Convergence
- Parent: Rafael Caldera

Andrés Caldera Pietri (born November 27, 1954, in Caracas) is a Venezuelan lawyer and politician who served as Secretary to the Presidency during the second administration of his father, former President Rafael Caldera.

== Biography ==
He served as the general secretary of his father's campaign during the 1993 general elections, which resulted in Rafael Caldera's victory. Following the election, Caldera Pietri filed a complaint with the Public Prosecutor's Office, alleging electoral fraud against parliamentary candidates of the Convergence party. Subsequently, in 1994, he was appointed Secretary to the Presidency, a position he held until 1996.

Caldera Pietri is a member of the Tomás Liscano Foundation and the Superior Council of Christian Democracy. In 2021, through this organization, he criticized Cuba for its support of Guyana in the territorial dispute over the Guayana Esequiba region.
