= Ednan Agaev =

Soviet diplomat

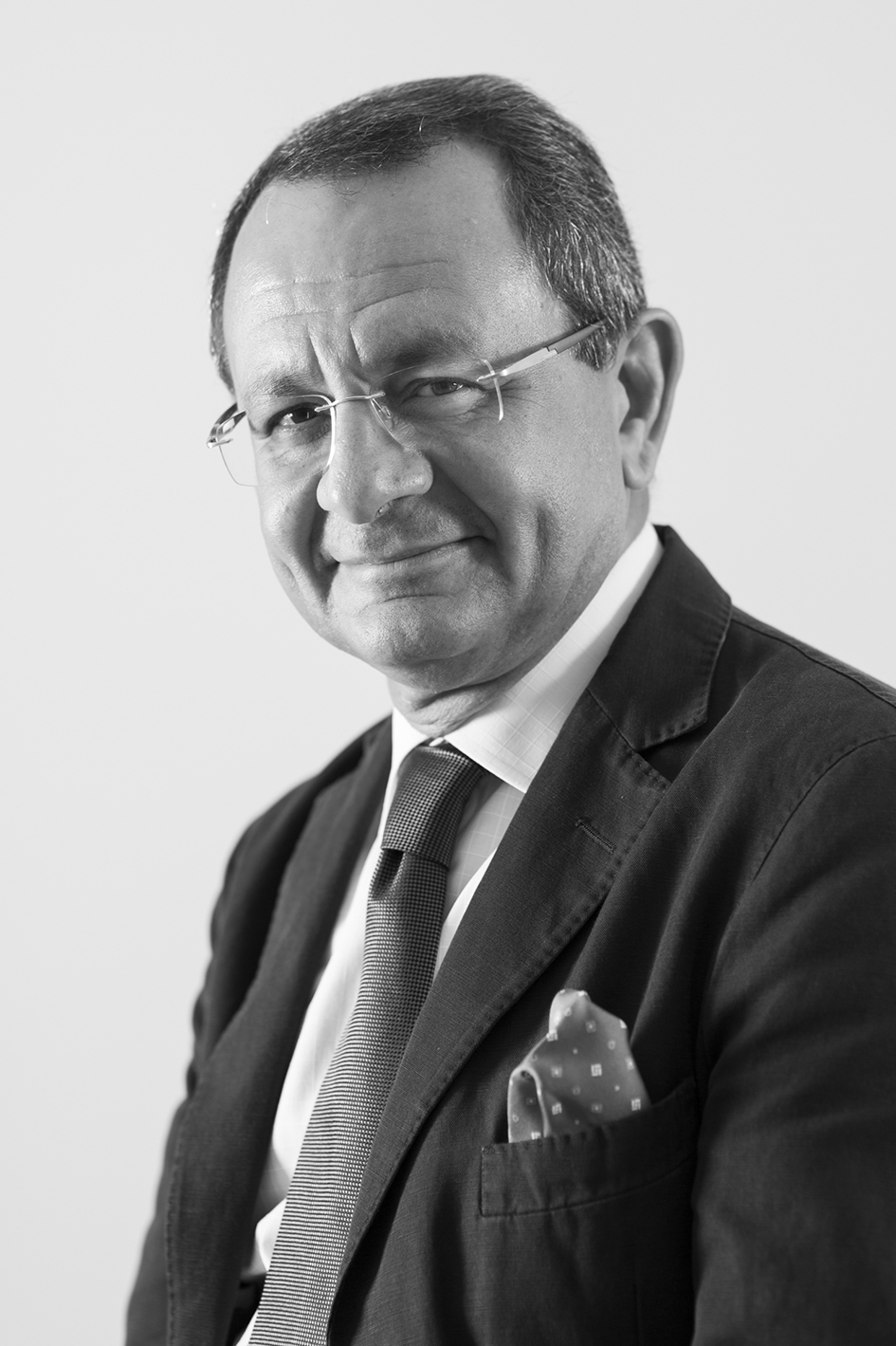
Agaev in 2013

Ednan Tofik oghlu Agaev (Russian: Эднан Тофик оглы Агаев; born 25 October, 1956) is a former Soviet and Russian diplomat, the Ex-Ambassador Extraordinary and Plenipotentiary of the Russian Federation in the Republic of Colombia. Currently he is a professional consultant on international projects, including cross-border M&A and project financing.

== Biography ==
From 1999 to 2013 Ednan Agaev was one of the founding members and a senior partner in the law firm EPAP, where he was the head of the international consulting practice participating in most of the company's international projects and acted as an advisor to the Russian Federation in various cases at the United Nations International Court of Justice.

From 1980 to 1999, he served as a career diplomat, occupying various senior positions in the Ministry of Foreign Affairs of the USSR and of the Russian Federation. He was the Ambassador Extraordinary and Plenipotentiary of the Russian Federation in the Republic of Colombia (1994-1999), the representative of the Russian Federation in the First Committee of the UN General Assembly (1991-1994), the head of the delegation of the Russian Federation at various negotiations on international security and arms control, the Special Advisor to the Minister of Foreign Affairs as well the Director of Foreign Policy Planning Department. He worked in the UN Secretariat, the UN office in Geneva (1980-1989), the UN Institute for Disarmament Research (UNIDIR) (1982-1986), and was a member of the Advisory Board on Disarmament affairs of the UN Secretary General (1991-1996).

In 2001 he cofounded the Russian American Business Council (RABC) where he served a senior vice-president of until 2012.

Ednan Agaev was a professor at the Moscow State Institute of International Relations (MGIMO), he gave lectures in various universities, including Georgetown University (USA), Graduate Institute of International and Development Studies (Switzerland), École Militaire and Pantheon-Assas (France).

In 1979, he graduated from the Moscow State Institute of International Relations (MGIMO). In 1985, he obtained a PhD in history, having successfully defended his thesis before a panel of the Diplomatic Academy of the Ministry of Foreign Affairs of the USSR.

Speaks Russian, English, French and Spanish.

== Awards and prizes ==
Russian Federation Presidential Certificate of Gratitude.
