= First presidency of Rafael Caldera =

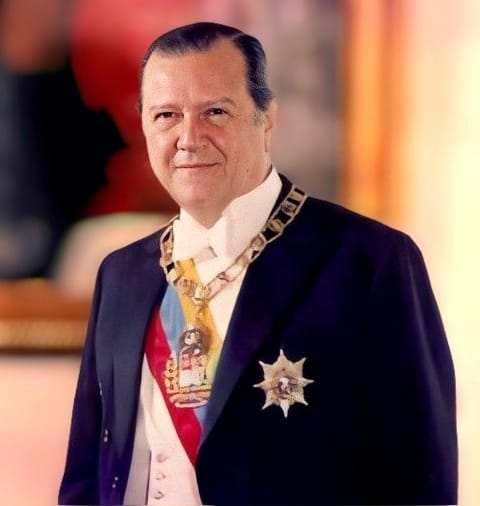
- Rafael Caldera
- First Presidency of Rafael Caldera; March 11, 1969 – March 11, 1974
- Cabinet: see list
- Party: Copei
- Election: 1968
- Seat: Miraflores Palace
- Presidential Standard (From 1970)

The first presidency of Rafael Caldera or the First Caldera Presidency or the First Caldera Administration was Rafael Caldera's first tenure as the President of Venezuela, which lasted from 11 March 1969 to 11 March 1974. He was elected by 33,000 votes. He was sworn in as president in March 1969—the first time in the country's 139-year history that an incumbent government peacefully surrendered power to the opposition. Rafael Caldera would later regain the Presidency following his victory in the 1993 elections in which, his second presidency would start on February 2, 1994.

== Background ==
The victory of Copei's Caldera after 11 years of Democratic Action (AD) rule proved that Venezuela was indeed a two-party state. During the Betancourt presidency, AD had produced a radical offshoot led by Domingo Alberto Rangel, but as it was banned it could not participate in the 1963 elections. AD had a core of leaders and still another offshoot was led by one of these, but they suffered a heavy defeat in the same elections. But during 1968, according to the "Buggins's turn" rule that the party applied, a referendum was held in which the two rival adecos were Luis Beltran Prieto Figueroa, a leading intellectual, and Gonzalo Barrios, a politician who was the leading light in the so-called "Parisian circle" within the party and whose turn it definitely wasn't. As the vote was an internal party affair the true results are unknown. It is as likely that Prieto Figueroa won as that he didn't, but the party hierarchy claimed that Barrios had and Barrios became the official candidate. Prieto Figueroa was incensed and he formed his own party whose secretary general was Jesus Angel Paz Galarraga. Caldera was anything if not obstinate and he had been the losing Social Christian COPEI candidate in the elections of 1947, 1958 and 1963. This time (1968) Caldera won against runner up Barrios by the margin of 30,000. Prieto Figueroa came in third, but a party that had been formed by nostalgic Pérezjimenistas and had no organization whatever obtained around a quarter of the vote for Congress, and this was happening less than ten years since the dictator's overthrow.

Venezuelan Presidential election 1968
Candidates	Votes	%
Rafael Caldera	1,083,712	29.13%
Gonzalo Barrios	1,050,806	28.24%
Miguel Angel Burelli	826,758	22.22%
Luis Pietro Figueroa	719,461	19.34%
Abstention:	135.311	3.27%
Total votes:	3,999,617	

In his political past, Caldera had been pro-business, but in his incarnation as president he increased government intervention in the economy. He was hamstrung by Congress, which was controlled by the adecos, so bureaucracy was kept at the same level it had been, but the new government applied the "to the victors belong the spoils" practice. The leftist parties, of which now there were many more than in 1958, were legalized. Towards the end of his government, oil prices increased but fiscal revenues came into the state's coffers too late for Caldera to use them to shape up his party's muscles. There was also a building boom in Caracas but the new constructions were going up but not into the market.

== Cabinet ==
1969-1974
Minister	Name	Períod
Internal Relations	Lorenzo Fernández	1969–1972
Internal Relations	Nectario Andrade Labarca	1972–1974
Foreign Affairs	Arístides Calvani	1969–1974
Finance	Pedro R. Tinoco	1969–1972
Finance	Luis Enrique Oberto	1972–1974
Defense	Martín García Villasmil	1969–1971
Defense	Jesús Carbonell Izquierdo	1971–1972
Defense	Gustavo Pardi Dávila	1972–1974
Development	Haydée Castillo	1969–1971
Development	Héctor Hernández Carabaño	1971–1974
Public Works	José Curiel	1969–1974
Educación	Héctor Hernández Carabaño	1969–1971
Educación	Enrique Pérez Olivares	1971–1974
Justice	Nectario Andrade Labarca	1969–1970
Justice	Orlando Tovar Tamayo	1970–1971
Justice	Edilberto Escalante	1971–1974
Mining and Hydrocarbons	Hugo Pérez La Salvia	1969–1974
Work	Alfredo Tarre Murzi	1969–1970
Work	Nectario Andrade Labarca	1970–1972
Work	Alberto Martín Urdaneta	1972–1974
Communications	Ramón José Velásquez	1969–1971
Communications	Enrique Bustamante Luciani	1971–1974
Agriculture	Jesús López Luque	1969–1971
Agriculture	Daniel Scott Cuervo	1971–1972
Agriculture	Miguel Rodríguez Viso	1972–1974
Health and Social Care	Lisandro Latuff	1969–1970
Health and Social Care	José de Jesús Mayz Lyón	1970–1974
Dispatch	Luis Alberto Machado	1969–1974
Cordiplan	Luis Enrique Oberto	1969–1972
Cordiplan	Antonio Casas González	1972–1974

== Domestic policy ==
The president's economic policies were notable for the reinforcement of the power of the employer's association Fedecámaras and the period of North American economic crisis that also characterized the first term of Richard Nixon with low oil prices, which caused the economic growth of Venezuela to stagnate. Caldera also presided over a period of pacification of the country, making a ceasefire with the left armed groups, which were then integrated into the political life, and legalizing the Communist Party of Venezuela in spite of the opposition of Acción Democrática.

=== Electoral policy ===
The Senate after the legalization of former guerrilla movements as parties: in orange the MAS and in purple the MEP.

In 1969, the new government inherited a country with active urban and rural guerrilla movements, bans on two major political parties and many political leaders imprisoned. From the beginning of Caldera's presidency, this practice was suspended and constitutional guarantees were maintained thereafter. The government adopted an attitude of ideological pluralism and dialogue across the political spectrum, entered into talks with armed groups, legalized left-wing parties and released imprisoned politicians, requiring only that they remain within Venezuelan law, including the Communist Party of Venezuela, despite opposition from Democratic Action.

Chamber of Deputies after the legalization of former guerrilla movements as parties: in red the MIR and in burgundy the PCV.

Rafael Caldera also reformed the 1961 Constitution of Venezuela to eliminate the prohibition on election to public office for persons who had been sentenced to more than three years in prison, which had been specifically designed to politically disqualify General Marcos Pérez Jiménez through its retroactive application.

=== Legislative policy ===
Caldera also reformed the 1961 Constitution to remove a ban on election to public office for people who had been sentenced to more than three years in prison, which had been specifically designed to politically disqualify General Marcos Pérez Jiménez by means of its retroactive application.

=== Education ===
Caldera closed the Industrial Technical School permanently and the Central University of Venezuela for two years due to student protests against his government.

=== Economic policy ===
Caldera's government nationalized the gas industry, promulgating laws that regulated the American oil companies operating in Venezuela. In 1971, Caldera raised the oil profits tax to 70 percent. In addition, he approved the Hydrocarbons Reversion Law, which provided that all assets of oil companies would pass to the State once concessions expired. A moratorium was declared on the granting of oil concessions. In the early 1970s, Venezuela established majority ownership in foreign banks.

The president's economic policies were notable for strengthening the power of the employers' federation Fedecámaras. The price of a barrel of oil rose from $2 to $14 during 1973.

=== Human rights policy ===
During Rafael Caldera's first government, several cases of forced disappearances were recorded, among them those of the student Luis Hernández, Laura Pérez Carmona de Prada, wife of FALN commander Francisco Prada Barazarte, and UCV student and Red Flag (BR) member Noel Rodríguez.

The case of Noel Rodríguez gained some prominence and rejection due to the government's pacification process with the guerrillas. Rodríguez disappeared in 1973, allegedly at the hands of state security forces, because he was involved in the kidnapping of businessman Carlos Domínguez.

After the case was resolved, the government announced Rodríguez's death, but his remains were not handed over to his family, provoking protests and hunger strikes by various movements. In August 1973, several lawyers denounced Noel Rodríguez's disappearance before the United Nations. His remains were found in 2012 in Caracas's General Cemetery of the South.

Within the framework of the investigations into the businessman's kidnapping, people allegedly linked to the event were killed by officials, such as Ramón Antonio Álvarez and José Rafael Bottini Marín, as well as five members of the Revolutionary People's Army (ERP).

In 1973, the nongovernmental organization United Pro-Amnesty Committees (CUPA) denounced the forced disappearance of Argelio José Reina, allegedly because he possessed a Cuban magazine considered subversive by officers. On 27 February of that year, Reina and a National Guard officer died in a car accident in a vehicle that was for private rather than official use. Reina's body was delivered to his family in a sealed urn and, after an autopsy carried out at the Central Hospital of Maracay, it was determined that he had been tortured.

The nongovernmental organization Committee in Defense of Human Rights (CDDH) and CUPA denounced cases of arbitrary detention protected by the Law on Vagrants and Criminals and extrajudicial executions during police operations. They also organized several demonstrations demanding freedom for political prisoners, freedom for unionization, the right to demonstrate and wage increases. They additionally denounced the killings of Jesús Márquez Finol, José Honorio Navarro and the extrajudicial execution of Dalia Margarita Vásquez while authorities were searching for an alleged member of the ERP-Punto Cero group.

These actions led, according to allegations by members of the CDDH and CUPA, to surveillance and threats by officials of the DISIP. The agency's director, Remberto Uzcátegui, accused them of being the "front for Red Flag".

=== Infrastructure policy ===
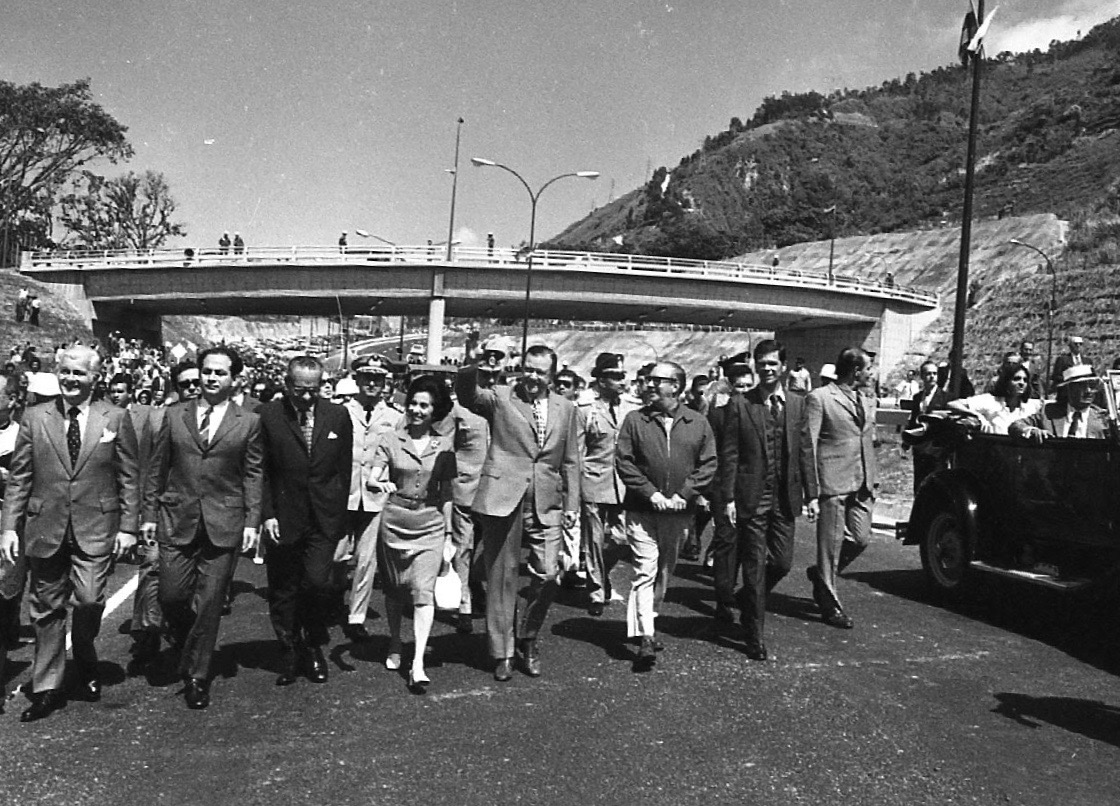
Inauguration of the Cota Mil (Boyacá Avenue) by President Rafael Caldera.

Among the works completed during his government were the inauguration of the Poliedro de Caracas, Parque Central, the building of the Central Bank of Venezuela, the Museum of Contemporary Art of Caracas and the Ríos Reyna Hall of the Teresa Carreño Cultural Complex in Caracas, as well as the Soto Museum of Ciudad Bolívar. Health centers were also constructed, including the Central Hospital of Maracay, the Dr. Miguel Pérez Carreño Hospital and the Los Magallanes de Catia Hospital in Caracas.

In transportation infrastructure, the Distribuidor El Ciempiés, the Prados del Este-La Trinidad Highway, the Cimarrón Andresote Central-Western Highway and Boyacá Avenue were inaugurated. Likewise, airports such as La Chinita International Airport, Santiago Mariño Caribbean International Airport and Josefa Camejo International Airport were created.

=== Media policy ===
First Lady Alicia Pietri de Caldera chaired the Children's Festival Foundation and created the television program Sopotocientos.

=== Defense ===
On December 9, 1970, Rafael Caldera created the Great Marshal of Ayacucho Institute of National Higher Defence Studies (IAEDEN) to further the development of a state security perspective and to contribute to the defense culture of the nation.

Caldera, who raised the tax on the rent to the oil companies to 60 percent, initiated the construction of El Tablazo petrochemical complex in Zulia. Led by finance minister Luis Enrique Oberto, Caldera's government began the process of nationalizing Venezuela's oil industry. He also inaugurated the Poliedro de Caracas and the Miguel Pérez Carreño Hospital in Caracas and concluded the demarcation of borders with Brazil.

Rafael Caldera ended his first term as president on March 12, 1974, and was replaced by Carlos Andrés Pérez, from Acción Democrática, who won the 1973 elections.

=== Security ===
==== Pacification of Venezuela ====
In 1969, the new government inherited a country with active urban and rural guerrilla movements, bans on two important political parties, and many political leaders imprisoned. From the beginning of Caldera's presidency, this practice was suspended and constitutional guarantees thereafter were maintained.

The government arrived with an attitude of ideological pluralism and dialogue across the political spectrum, entered into talks with the armed groups, legalized leftist parties, and released jailed politicians, demanding only that they stay within Venezuelan law.

As a result of this effort, by the end of Caldera's presidency, for the first time in many years, no significant political organization in Venezuela planned to take control of the government by violent means. At the 1973 elections, leaders of the former guerrilla movements were elected as senators and deputies.

== Foreign policy ==
Caldera's first government emphasized the end of the Betancourt Doctrine, which denied Venezuelan diplomatic recognition to any regime, right or left, that came to power by military force. Caldera broke the isolation of Venezuela with the rest of Latin America, recognizing the military governments of the region, and made a policy in defense of the insular territories and the Gulf of Venezuela and signed the Port of Spain Protocol with Guyana, which concerned the Guyana–Venezuela territorial dispute.

=== International trips ===
The following list summarises the official foreign visits made by Caldera during his first term as President of Venezuela:

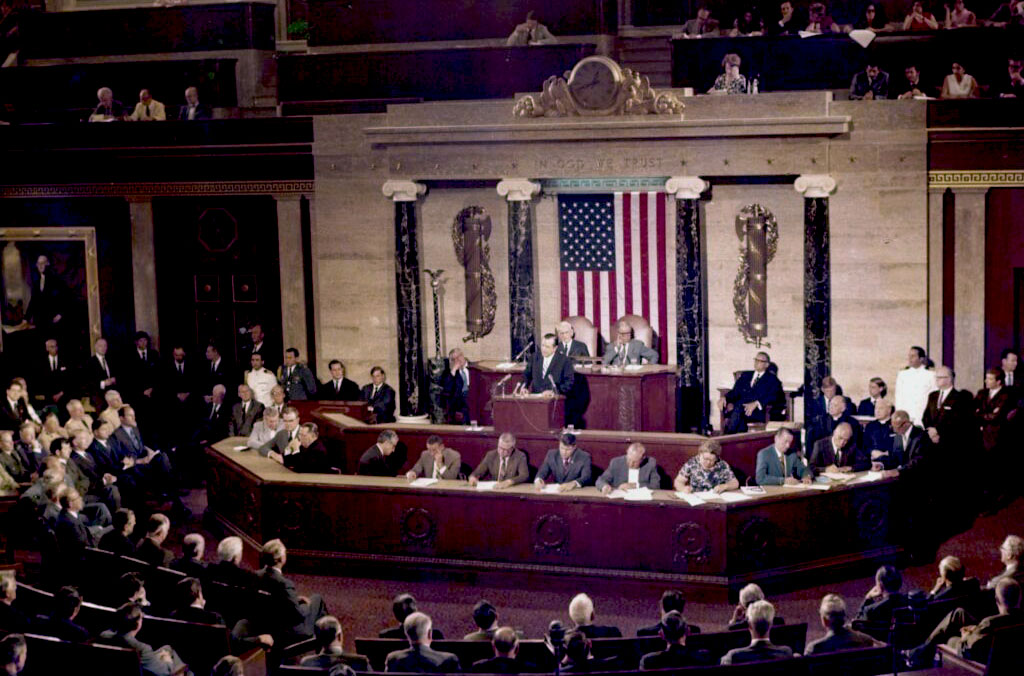
Caldera before the full session of the United States Congress, 3 June 1970

==== 1969 ====
Date	Place	Main purpose
6–9 August	(Colombia)	Official tour at the invitation of President Carlos Lleras Restrepo on the occasion of the sesquicentennial of the Battle of Boyacá. On 9 August, both presidents signed the Sochagota Declaration, which advocated integration and the strengthening of bilateral relations.

==== 1970 ====
Date	Place	Main purpose
2–4 June	Washington, D.C., Houston (United States)	Official visit. Speech at a joint session of the United States Congress.

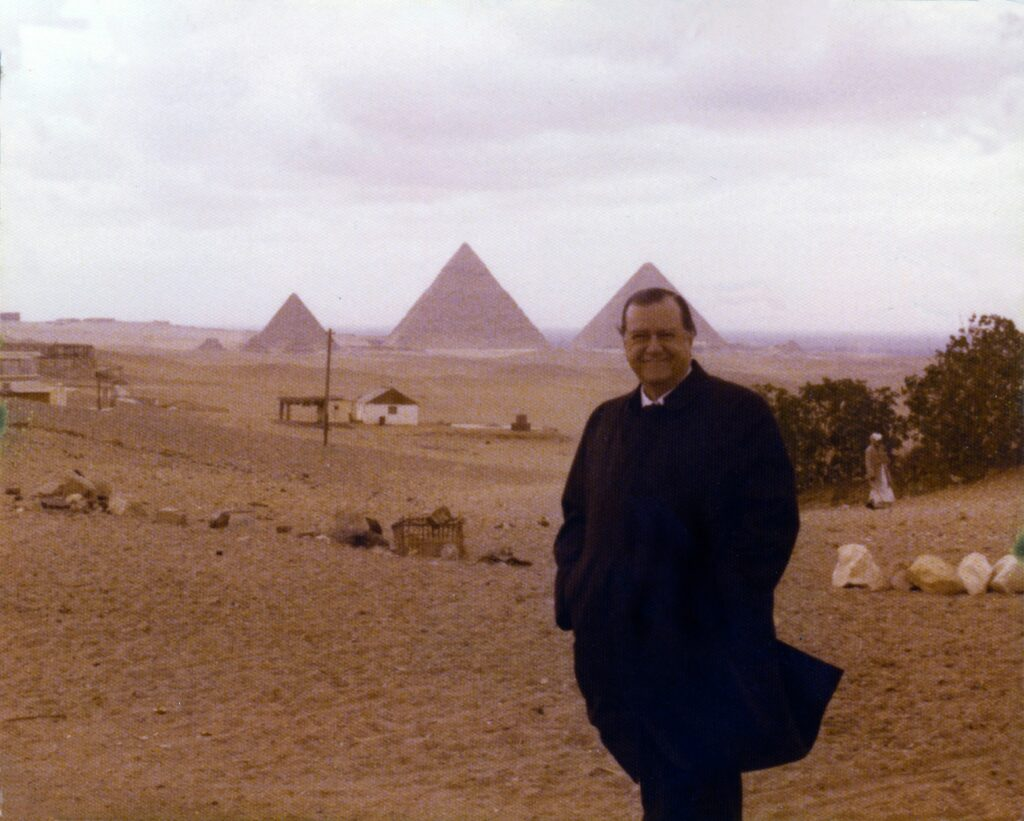
Rafael Caldera in front of the Egyptian pyramids during his visit to the country in 1976.

== See also ==
- History of Venezuela, 1953–1999
- Rafael Caldera
- Second Presidency of Rafael Caldera
- Presidency of Raúl Leoni
- First presidency of Carlos Andrés Pérez
- Presidents of Venezuela
