= List of ambassadors of Russia to Brazil =

Ambassador of the Russian Federation to the Federative Republic of Brazil
- Emblem of the Russian Foreign Ministry

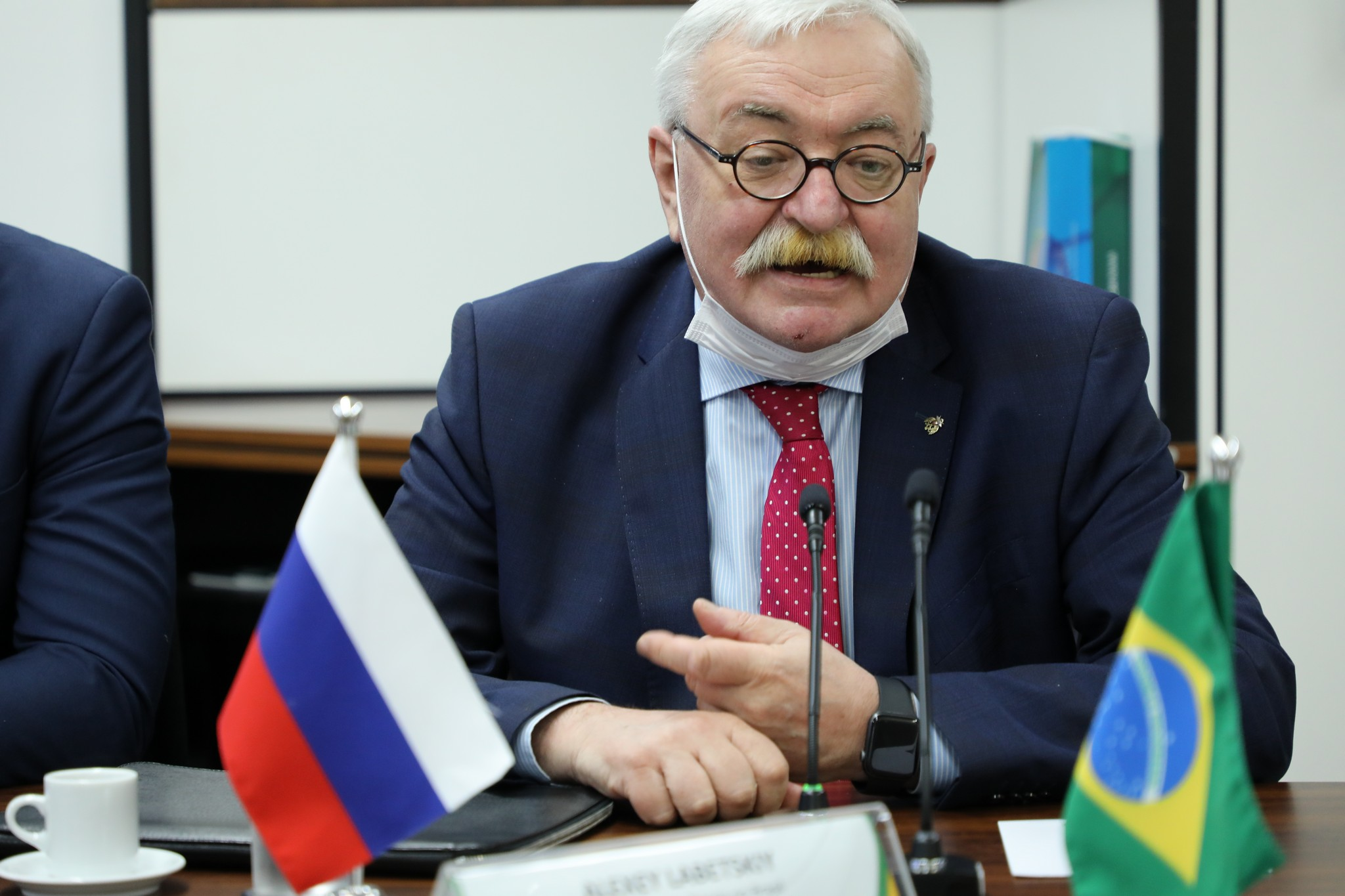
- Incumbent; Aleksey Labetsky since 28 January 2021
- Ministry of Foreign Affairs; Embassy of Russia in Brasília
- Style: His Excellency; The Honourable
- Reports to: Minister of Foreign Affairs
- Seat: Brasília
- Appointer: President of Russia
- Term length: At the pleasure of the president
- Website: Embassy of Russia in Brazil

The ambassador extraordinary and plenipotentiary of the Russian Federation to the Federative Republic of Brazil is the official representative of the president and the government of the Russian Federation to the president and the government of Brazil.

The ambassador and his staff work at large in the Embassy of Russia in Brasília. There are consulates general in Rio de Janeiro and São Paulo. The post of Russian ambassador to Brazil is currently held by Aleksey Labetsky, incumbent since 28 January 2021. Since 1995 the ambassador to Brazil has been concurrently accredited to the Republic of Suriname.

== History of diplomatic relations ==
Consular relations between Russia and what became the modern state of Brazil date back to the early nineteenth century. With the French invasion of Portugal in 1807 during the Napoleonic Wars, the Portuguese Court was transferred to its colony in Brazil. The new capital of the Portuguese Empire was thereafter in Rio de Janeiro. In early July 1811 Friedrich von der Pahlen was appointed envoy to the Portuguese court in Rio de Janeiro. On 30 July that year Xavier and Mikhail Labensky were appointed Consul General and Vice Consul respectively in Rio de Janeiro. Rio de Janeiro ceased to be the capital of the Portuguese Empire in April 1821, with the return of the court to Portugal. The Russian mission moved to Portugal with the court, though consular relations were maintained between Russia and Brazil until November 1827. One of the early consuls during this period was Grigori Langsdorf, who carried out expeditions to the interior of Brazil, gathering material on the flora and fauna, as well as conducting cartographic studies.

Diplomatic relations between the Russian Empire and the Empire of Brazil were first established on 3 October 1828. Frants Borel-Palentssky, the head of the Consular Affairs Expedition of the Russian Ministry of Foreign Affairs since 1809, had taken a particular interest in the initial establishment of the consulate in Brazil, was appointed the first envoy to Brazil. They continued after the establishment of the First Brazilian Republic in 1889, but were broken off after the October Revolution in 1917 and the establishment of the Soviet Union. Diplomatic relations between the Soviet Union and the United States of Brazil were established briefly in 1945, but were broken off in 1947 after the establishment of the Fourth Brazilian Republic, by the elected government of the anti-communist and USA-aligned military officer Eurico Dutra. Relations were restored in 1961. With the dissolution of the Soviet Union in 1991, the Brazilian government was among the first to recognize the Russian Federation as the successor state of the USSR. The Soviet ambassador, Leonid Kuzmin, continued as representative of the Russian Federation until 1992.

== List of representatives (1828–present) ==
=== Russian Empire to the Empire of Brazil (1828–1889) ===
Name	Title	Appointment	Termination	Notes
Frants Borel-Palentssky	Envoy	3 October 1828	20 December 1831	
Apollon Maltits	Chargé d'affaires	20 December 1831	16 March 1835	
Sergey Lomonosov	Chargé d'affaires (16 March 1835 - 11 March 1841); Resident Minister (11 March 1841 - 23 November 1843); Envoy (23 November 1843 - 11 March 1848)	16 March 1835	11 March 1848	
Alexander Medem	Envoy	3 November 1848	9 February 1854	
Otton Evers	Chargé d'affaires	13 February 1854	13 April 1857	
Dmitry Glinka	Envoy	7 July 1856	3 April 1871	
Iosif Koskul	Envoy	3 April 1871	18 August 1881	
Aleksandr Ionin	Envoy	2 July 1883	1889	

=== Russian Empire to the Republic of Brazil (1889–1917) ===
Name	Title	Appointment	Termination	Notes
Aleksandr Ionin	Envoy	1889	22 December 1892	
Mikhail von Giers	Envoy	11 May 1895	8 June 1898	
Alexey Shpeyer	Envoy	8 June 1898	1904	
Mavriky Prozor	Envoy	December 1904	1909	
Peter Maksimov	Envoy	1910	1915	
Aleksandr Shcherbatsky	Envoy	1916	26 October 1917	

=== Soviet Union to the Republic of Brazil (1946–1991) ===
Name	Title	Appointment	Termination	Notes
Yakov Surits	Envoy	13 May 1946	20 October 1947	
Ilya Chernyshyov	Ambassador	12 December 1961	21 October 1962	
Andrey Fomin	Ambassador	21 November 1962	30 September 1965	
Sergey Mikhailov	Ambassador	30 September 1965	30 May 1974	
Dmitry Zhukov	Ambassador	30 May 1974	24 March 1981	
Vladimir Chernyshyov	Ambassador	2 September 1981	5 September 1986	
Viktor Isakov	Ambassador	5 September 1986	26 August 1988	
Leonid Kuzmin	Ambassador	8 September 1988	25 December 1991	

=== Russian Federation to the Republic of Brazil (1991–present) ===
Name	Title	Appointment	Termination	Notes
Leonid Kuzmin	Ambassador	25 December 1991	3 September 1992	
Iosif Podrazhanets	Ambassador	3 December 1993	17 April 1998	
Vasily Gromov	Ambassador	11 January 1999	15 July 2004	
Vladimir Tyurdenev	Ambassador	15 July 2004	23 November 2009	
Sergei Akopov	Ambassador	15 February 2010	28 January 2021	
Aleksey Labetsky	Ambassador	28 January 2021		
