= Orlando Castro Llanes =

Venezuelan businessman

Orlando Castro Llanes (October 30, 1925 - February 25, 2014) was a Venezuelan businessman whose financial empire of banks and insurance agencies collapsed in 1994 and was subsequently convicted and imprisoned in the United States.

== From Communist to capitalist ==
He was born in Havana, Cuba, in 1925, and became active in politics. He was head of a wing of Cuba’s Communist Party until after the 1959 Cuban Revolution, when he allegedly quarrelled with Fidel Castro and left the country.

He moved to Venezuela, where he became an insurance salesman. He was successful at this, and rose to control a conglomerate of insurance companies, banks, real estate, radio stations and newspapers. He was reputed to be one of the wealthiest men in Venezuela. His Grupo Empresas Latinoamericanas included the Banco Progreso in Venezuela, the Banco Progreso Internacional de Puerto Rico, and the Banco Latinoamericana in the Dominican Republic.

== The fight over Banco de Venezuela ==
In 1990, he bought a large block of shares in the prestigious Banco de Venezuela (BdV), a bastion of Caracas's old-money elite, and tried to get on its board of directors. However, according to Castro, he was never accepted in exclusive political and economic circles and was considered unfit by the Venezuelan elite to lead the country’s most important banking institution. At a stockholders' meeting, when Castro wanted a seat on the board, BdV's chairman suspended the meeting and muffled Castro's protest by shutting off his microphone.

Castro now attempted a hostile takeover of BdV, which was bitterly contested by BdV's management. He worked through his subsidiary Grupo Progreso Latinoamericana, supported by Banco Consolidado of José Alvarez Stelling, and Grupo Banco Unión.

A small group of shareholders, all members of the Caracas Country Club, joined with the Banco Provincial, the powerful industrial group Grupo Polar, and Finalven to oppose the takeover. BdV hired Thor Halvorssen Hellum, Special Commissioner for International Narcotic Affairs in the administration of President Carlos Andrés Pérez, to investigate rumors of money laundering by Castro.

Halvorssen concluded that Castro was laundering drug money and was involved in other financial irregularities. He gave his information to friendly members of the Venezuelan Congress, who had parliamentary immunity. Castro’s allies started a media campaign to discredit Halvorssen.

== Money laundering accusations ==
In March 1991, after the allegations of money laundering were made public, the US Customs Service froze Banco Progreso accounts at Bank of America International in New York City.

Castro employed his business associate Charles Intriago to counter the allegations. Intriago was Castro’s principal legal advisors on matters related to the United States. Castro Llanes had provided US$80,000 in start-up capital for Intriago’s newsletter Money Laundering Alert. Intriago eventually got US Customs to release the accounts.

Intriago used his government connections to purge law enforcement files of information linking Castro Llanes to drug trafficking. He hired former US officials and investigators, who between 1991 and 1995 approached several different US government agencies for information. They eventually obtained DEA's intelligence files on Castro Llanes, and the names of at least four confidential informants against Castro Llanes for Customs. A former IRS agent working for Intriago found that some US$4 billion had passed through a Castro account in New York. He gave this information to US Customs agents and was fired by Intriago. New York District Attorney Robert Morgenthau linked Castro to 3,500 offshore corporations in Aruba, Curaçao, and elsewhere. The US$4 billion was never tied definitively to drug trafficking.

On the instigation of Intriago – who was a Democratic National Committee trustee – Castro contributed US$50,000 to the Democratic Party. He attended the January 1993 inauguration of US President Clinton and received red carpet treatment from the Clinton Administration. The donation was reimbursed by one of Castro's Venezuelan companies, making the contributions illegal under US law.

== US conviction and imprisonment ==
In 1994, the Venezuelan banking system collapsed – after the breakdown of President Perez’s regime in 1993 and the failure of Banco Latino, the second largest bank in the country. Castro's enterprises also failed.

Castro fled to the US and settled in Miami. Venezuelan banking regulators seized Banco Progreso in December 1994. Castro was later charged in absentia by the Venezuelan government with bank fraud, embezzlement, and conspiracy. Banco Progreso losses neared US$2.2 billion and dragged down three more banks controlled by Castro.

On April 4, 1996, Castro was indicted in New York by District Attorney Morgenthau, along with his son, Orlando Castro Castro, and grandson Jorge Castro Barredo, on charges of a scheme to defraud in the first degree. The three Castros were convicted on grand larceny charges on February 19, 1997. In April of that year he was sentenced to a term of one to three years in prison. The larceny was defrauding depositors of Banco Progreso International de Puerto Rico of as much as US$55 million. His crime also cost the government of Venezuela more than US$8 million.

Castro Llanes served 25 months in prison, then voluntarily returned to Venezuela. In 2007, Castro convicted of criminal libel against Miguel Henrique Otero, the director of newspaper El Nacional. He was sentenced to two months imprisonment. However, by Venezuelan laws, he was granted parole for being older than 65 years.
