= Ramón José Velásquez =

President of Venezuela from 1993 to 1994

Ramón J. Velásquez
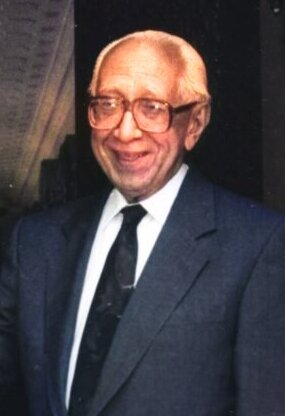
- Velásquez in 1993

Acting President of Venezuela
- In office 5 June 1993 – 2 February 1994
- Preceded by: Octavio Lepage (acting)
- Succeeded by: Rafael Caldera

Minister of Communications of Venezuela
- In office 1969–1971

Secretary of the Presidency of Venezuela
- In office 1959–1963
- Succeeded by: Manuel Mantilla

Personal details
- Born: 28 November 1916 San Juan de Colón, Táchira, United States of Venezuela
- Died: 24 June 2014 (aged 97) Caracas, Venezuela
- Party: Acción Democrática (1941–2014)
- Spouse: Ligia Margarita Betancourt Goicoechea de Valásquez (m. 1948; died 2008)
- Education: Central University of Venezuela (1928–2014)

Ramón José Velásquez Mujica (28 November 1916 – 24 June 2014) was a Venezuelan politician, historian, journalist, and lawyer. He served as the president of Venezuela between 1993 and 1994.

== Early life ==
Velásquez was born in Táchira in November 1916. His parents were Ramon Velasquez Ordoñez, a journalist and proofreader for a newspaper and educator Regina Mujica. For his initial studies he was home schooled by his parents in his hometown. He completed his primary education in San Cristóbal Simón Bolívar. In 1935, he traveled to Caracas to finish high school at the Liceo Andres Bello. Velasquez undertook his higher education at the Central University of Venezuela, from which he received a PhD in social and political sciences in 1942 and a law degree in 1943.

== Writer ==
Velásquez became a reporter for Últimas Noticias in 1941. Velásquez was the president of El Nacional on two occasions (1964–1968, 1979–1981).

He authored numerous books on Venezuela's political history, being generally considered in his lifetime as Venezuela's foremost historian. He was President of the National Academy of History.

== Statesman ==
During the dictatorship of Marcos Pérez Jiménez, Velásquez was jailed for a year for his role at the compilation of the Libro negro de la dictadura (Black book of dictatorship). The files of this book helped expose the crimes of the dictatorial period.

In 1958, as Venezuela transitioned to democracy, Velásquez was elected to the Venezuelan Senate for the state of Tachira, and later to the Venezuelan Chamber of Deputies for the state of Miranda.

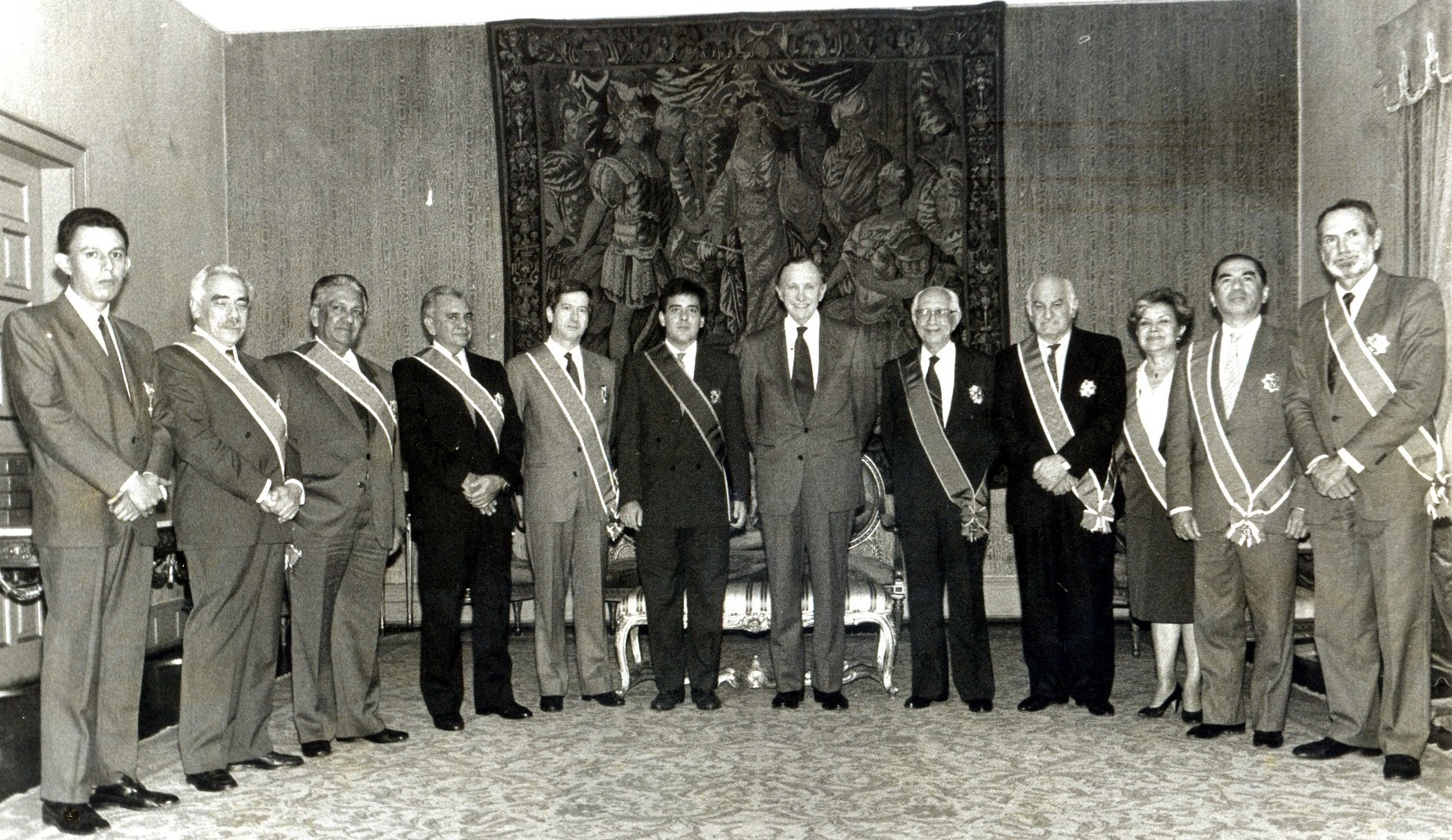
Velásquez and the COPAF's members in Bogota in 1991.

He served as Secretary General (Chief of Staff) of the Presidency during the government of Rómulo Betancourt. After that, he was part of the National Congress. During Rafael Caldera's Presidential administration, Velásquez served as Minister of Communications from 1969 until 1971. From 1984 to 1987 he was President of the Comisión para la Reforma del Estado (COPRE), the Commission on the Reform of the State. Between 1989 and 1993, he chaired the Presidential Committee for Colombian-Venezuelan Border Issues (COPAF). At the time of his death, he was a board member of the New York-based Human Rights Foundation.

=== President ===
In 1993, as a result of the crisis produced by the impeachment of President Carlos Andrés Pérez, Congress appointed Velásquez President of the Republic, finishing the constitutional period in 1994. He served from 5 June 1993 to 2 February 1994. As a highly respected national figure there was general consensus around his name for such a task. In August Velásquez held an emergency meeting to respond to the tropical storm Bret's heavy damage that left at least 70 dead. About 1,400 workers and volunteers helped in rescue efforts after the mudslides struck Caracas and surrounding areas, assisted by Red Cross volunteers and 800 firefighters. Storm victims were temporarily housed at the Fuerte Tiuna army base. Roads were quickly cleared of debris and mud, although many were not reopened initially due to the threat for additional mudslides. The government was overshadowed by the so-called narcoindulto to trafficker Larry Tovar Acuña, in this case the Private Secretariat of the Presidency obtained irregularly signed by the President for the release to a known drug dealer. Other events under his brief government include the bankruptcy of Banco Latino with subsequent leakage of foreign currency abroad and tragedy of Tejerías. Among his governmental measures was the introduction of Value Added Tax as part of the Enabling Act entrusted to the National Congress.

==== Velásquez's cabinet (1993–1994) ====
1993–1994
Ministry of Interior	Carlos Delgado Chapellín	1993–1994
Ministry of Foreign Affairs	Fernando Ochoa Antich	1993–1994
Ministry of Finance	Carlos Rafael Silva	1993–1994
Ministry of Defense	Iván Darío Jiménez Sánchez	1993
Ministry of Defense	Radamés Muñoz León	1993
Ministry of Defense	Rafael Montero Revette	1993–1994
Ministry of Development	Gustavo Pérez Mijares	1993–1994
Ministry of Transport and Communications	José Domingo Santander	1993–1994
Ministry of Education	Elizabeth Yabour de Caldera	1993–1994
Ministry of Justice	Fermín Mármol León	1993–1994
Ministry of Mines and Hydrocarbons	Alirio Parra	1993–1994
Ministry of Environment	Adalberto Gabaldón Azuaje	1993–1994
Ministry of Agriculture	Hiram Gaviria	1993–1994
Ministry of Labor	Luis Horacio Vivas	1993–1994
Ministry of Health and Social Assistance	Pablo Pulido Musche	1993–1994
Ministry of Urban Development	Henry Jattar Senior	1993–1994
Ministry of Family and Youth	Teresa Albánez	1993–1994
Secretariat of the Presidency of the Republic	Ramón Espinoza	1993–1994
Office of Coordination and Planning	Hernán Anzola Jiménez	1993–1994
CVG	Francisco Layrisse	1993–1994

== Personal life ==
In 31/8/1947, Ramón José Velásquez married Ligia Margarita Betancourt Goicoechea (1920 – 14 July 2008) who served as First Lady of Venezuela from 1993 to 1994. On 24 June 2014 Velásquez died at the age of 97 from natural causes. He died 5 weeks after former President Jaime Lusinchi died on 21 May 2014.

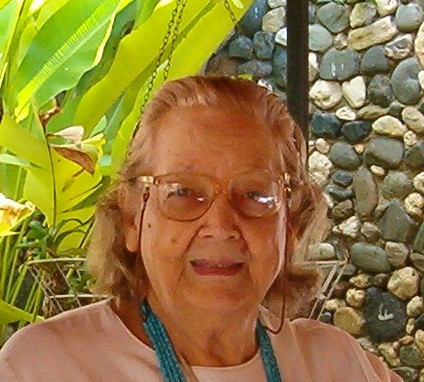
Ligia Margarita Betancourt Goicoechea

== Honours ==
- Maria Moors Cabot prize (1967)
- Member of the National Academy of History of Venezuela (1968)
- National Prize for Literature (1973), prose category, for La caída del liberalismo amarillo
- Premio Nacional de Historia of Consejo Nacional de la Cultura (CONAC), 1980
- Premio Nacional de Humanidades of CONAC, 1998
- Member of the Academia Venezolana de la Lengua, 2002
- Honorary doctorates from the University of the Andes (Venezuela), University of Carabobo, Rafael Urdaneta University (URU) and the National Experimental University of Táchira (UNET).

== Books ==
- Coro. Raíz de Venezuela (1962)
- San Cristóbal. Donde la Patria empieza (1972)
- La caída del Liberalismo Amarillo. Tiempo y drama de Antonio Paredes (1972)
- Aspectos de la evolución política de Venezuela en el siglo XX (1976)
- Confidencias Imaginarias de Juan Vicente Gómez (1978)
- Individuos de Número (1981)
- Los héroes y la Historia (1981)
- Los pasos de los héroes (1988)
- Con segunda intención. Reportajes en tiempos de dictadura 1951-1955 (1990)
- Memorias de Venezuela (1990)
- Los alemanes en el Táchira (1993)
- Joaquín Crespo (2005)
- Memorias del Siglo XX (2005)
- Caudillos, historiadores y pueblo (2013)

== See also ==
- Political prisoners in Venezuela

Political offices
Preceded by Octavio Lepage	President of Venezuela; 1993–1994	Succeeded by Rafael Caldera
