= Corruption in Venezuela =

The Corrupt Venezuelan Regime, according to the United States Department of Justice

Corruption in Venezuela permeates all aspects of politics, business, law enforcement, and other sectors. The discovery of oil in Venezuela in the early 20th century worsened political corruption. While corruption is not a new phenomenon in Venezuela, it worsened with the Chávez and Maduro regimes. In recent years, Venezuela has been ranked as one of the most corrupt countries globally by Transparency International, and corruption has played a role in the economic collapse and broader crisis in Venezuela. A 2014 Gallup poll found that 75% of Venezuelans believed that corruption was widespread throughout the Venezuelan government. Discontent with corruption was cited by demonstrators as one of the reasons for the 2014 and 2017 Venezuelan protests.

According to Transparency International's 2025 Corruption Perceptions Index, Venezuela scored 10 on a scale from 0 ("highly corrupt") to 100 ("very clean"), continuing its lowest score ever from the previous year. When ranked by score, Venezuela ranked 180th among the 182 countries in the Index, where the country ranked first is perceived to have the most honest public sector. For comparison with regional scores, the best score among the countries of the Americas (Note: Argentina, Bahamas, Barbados, Belize, Bolivia, Brazil, Canada, Chile, Colombia, Costa Rica, Cuba, Dominica, Dominican Republic, Ecuador, El Salvador, Grenada, Guatemala, Guyana, Haiti, Honduras, Jamaica, Mexico, Nicaragua, Panama, Paraguay, Peru, Saint Lucia, Saint Vincent and the Grenadines, Suriname, Trinidad and Tobago, United States of America, Uruguay, Venezuela) was 75, the average score was 42 and the worst score was Venezuela's, 10. For comparison with worldwide scores, the best score was 89 (ranked 1), the average score was 42, and the worst score was 9 (ranked 181, in a two-way tie).

In 2023, Transparencia Venezuela announced that the amount of money in judicial cases of 26 different countries investigating government corruption amounted to at least $70 billion dollars.

== History ==
The history of Venezuela has been mired with "persistent and intense presence of corruption", according to the Cato Institute. In 1991, author Ruth Capriles wrote The history of corruption in Venezuela is the history of our democracy depicting the many instances of corruption in the country.

=== Simón Bolívar (1813–1830) ===
During the Venezuelan War of Independence in 1813, Simón Bolívar made a decree that any corruption was punishable by death, according to the Cato Institute.

Authors Beddow and Thibodeaux stated that Karl Marx called Bolívar a "[f]alsifier, deserter, conspirator, liar, coward, and looter". Marx dismissed Bolívar as a "false liberator who merely sought to preserve the power of the old Creole nobility which he belonged". According to Marx, after Bolívar arrived in Caracas in 1813, Bolívar's "dictatorship soon proved a military anarchy, leaving the most important affairs in the hands of favorites, who squandered the finances of the country, and then resorted to odious means in order to restore them".

During his presidency in the 1820s, Bolívar made two decrees stating corruption was "the violation of the public interest" and reinforced his edict by saying such actions were punishable by death, according to the Cato Institute. However, under Bolívar, orders were made to plunder cities, with ornaments from churches being stolen to finance his military forces. In 1826, the Congress of Gran Colombia, which was subservient to Bolívar and had been suffering from financial issues, awarded Bolívar over 1 million pesos while other officials resorted to appropriating and expropriating from the public.

=== Antonio Guzmán Blanco (1870–1887) ===
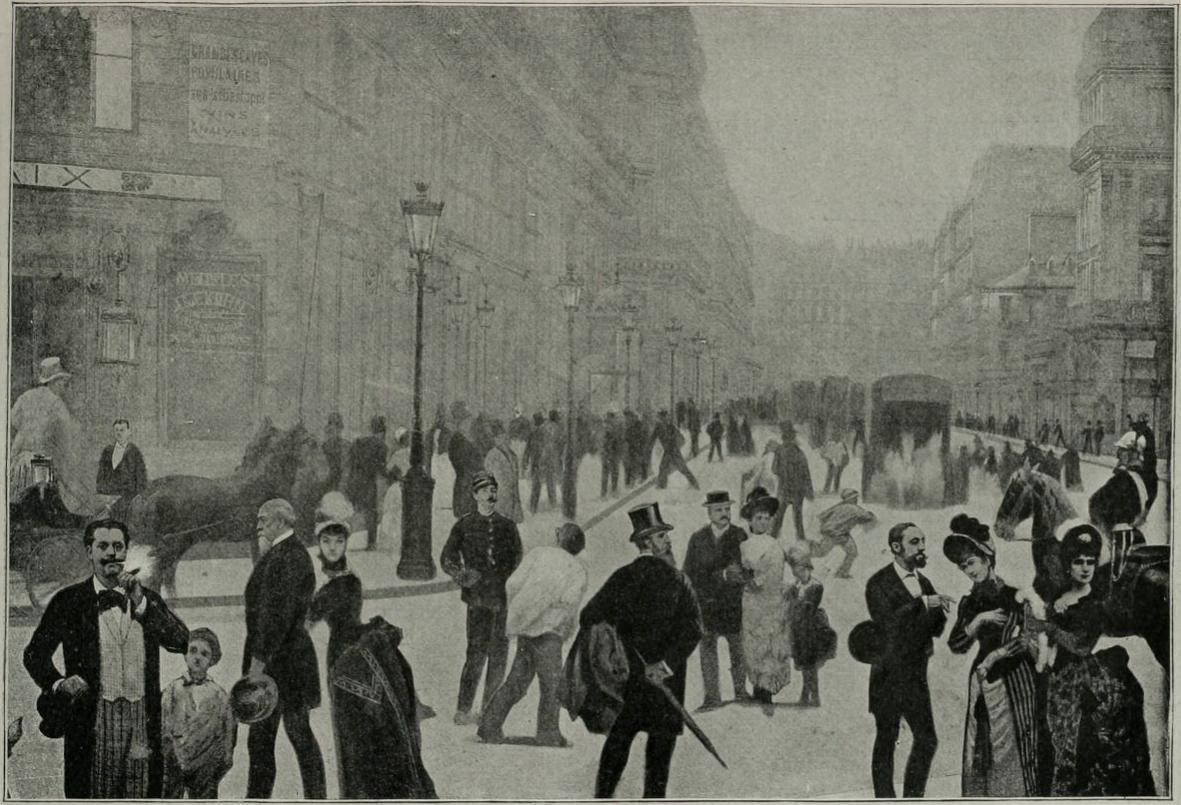
An 1889 image of Guzmán in Paris, France. He is in the foreground, third from the left.

Antonio Guzmán Blanco led a fairly steady Venezuelan government that was allegedly rife with corruption. He sought to change Venezuela from a "backward and savage country", to a more prosperous one, admiring the United States and especially France. Guzmán reportedly stole money from the treasury, abused his power, and, after a disagreement with a bishop, expelled any clergy who disagreed with him and seized property belonging to the Catholic Church.

=== Cipriano Castro (1899–1908) ===
Cipriano Castro served as governor of Táchira until he was overthrown and exiled to Colombia in 1892. He then amassed considerable wealth through illegal cattle trading and hired a private army with which he intended to march on Caracas. After a successful coup in 1899, his dictatorship was one of the most corrupt periods in Venezuela's history. Once in charge, Castro began plundering the treasury and modifying the constitution to convenience his administration. He and his cronies established monopolies to line their pocket, a move that was also designed to antagonize foreign capital. He had political opponents murdered or exiled, lived extravagantly and broke down diplomacy with foreign countries. He provoked numerous foreign actions, including blockades and bombardments by British, German, and Italian naval vessels seeking to enforce the claims of their citizens against Castro's government. When Castro was ousted, Venezuela was in complete fiscal disorder and constantly in conflict with its neighbors.

=== Juan Vicente Gómez (1908–1935) ===
From 1908 to 1935, the dictator Juan Vincente Gomez held power, with his acts of corruption only committed with "immediate collaborators," according to the Cato Institute. By the time he died, he was by far the richest man in the country. He did little for public education and held basic democratic principles in disdain. His allegedly ruthless crushing of opponents through his secret police earned him the reputation of a tyrant. He was also accused by opponents of trying to turn the country into a personal fiefdom.

=== Marcos Pérez Jiménez (1952–1958) ===
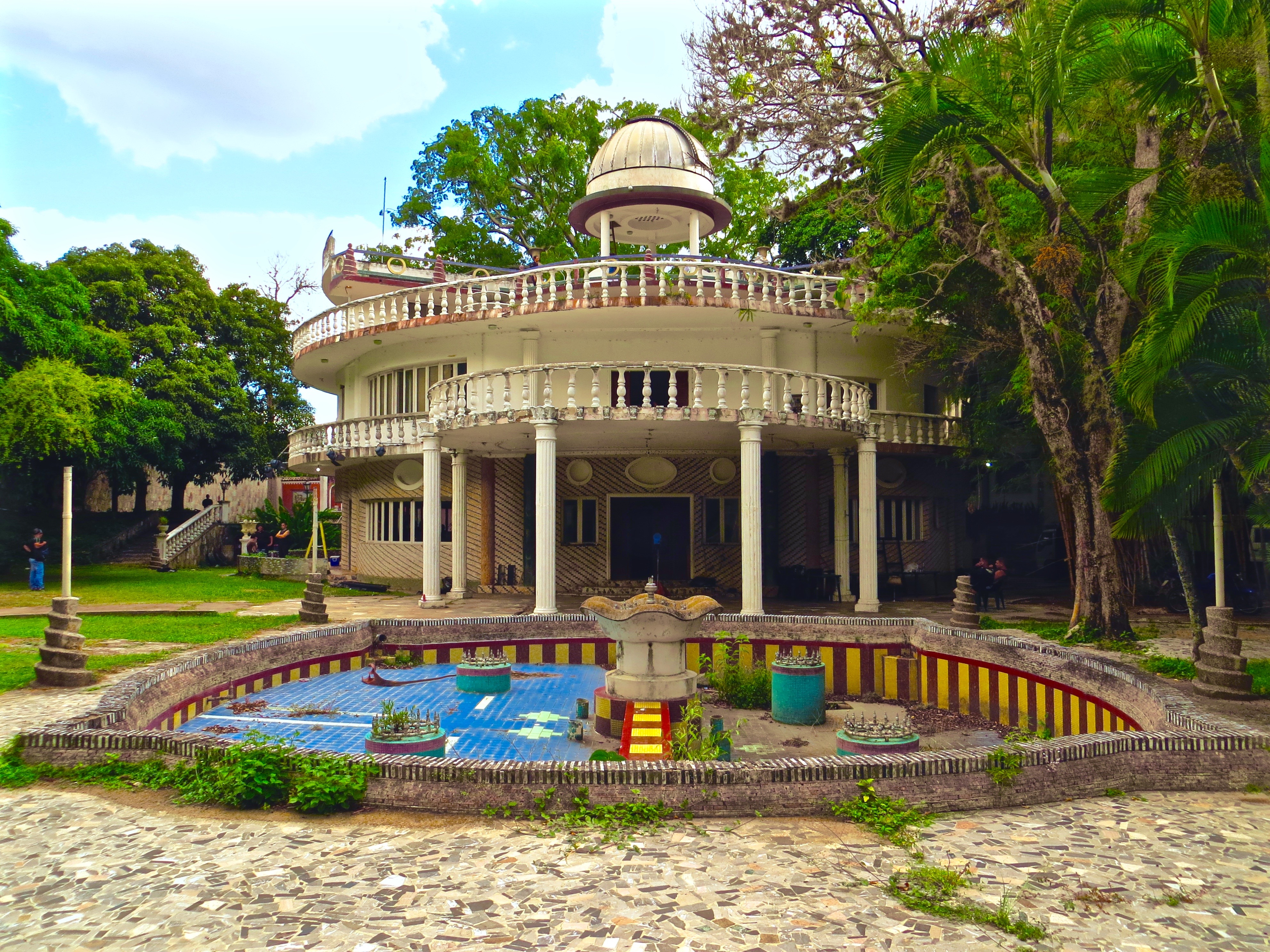
A house of Marcos Pérez Jiménez that featured fountains, a pool, an elevator, an observatory and tunnels.

Marcos Pérez Jiménez seized power through electoral fraud in 1952. The government's National Security (Seguridad Nacional, secret police) was extremely repressive against critics of the regime and ruthlessly hunted down and imprisoned those who opposed the dictatorship.

On 23 January 1958, a coup d'état was performed against Pérez Jiménez. Pérez Jiménez, fleeing from Miraflores Palace, went to La Carlota Airport to seek exile in the Dominican Republic. While rushing out of Venezuela, Pérez Jiménez left $2 million in a suitcase on the runway of La Carlota Airport.

=== Democracy (1958–1999) ===
During the first administration of Carlos Andrés Pérez from 1974 to 1979, the 1973 oil crisis caused petroleum profits to be at record highs. His government substantially increased debt, nationalized the oil industry into PDVSA, as well as the iron industry, created new state-owned companies, nationalized the central bank and replaced its board with cabinet members, eliminating the bank's independence as a result. The result of these policies was a system of patrimonialism and increased government corruption. In 1980, the Venezuelan Congress found Carlos Andrés politically responsible for the overprice in the purchase of the ship Sierra Nevada, but acquitted him of administrative and moral responsibility.

During the presidency of Jaime Lusinchi, US$36 billion was misused by the foreign exchange program RECADI, according to the Cato Institute. Arrest warrants were issued against five businessmen for false imports into Venezuela as part of the exchange program, of which Chinese businessman Ho Fuk Wing was imprisoned for three years before being sentenced and detained for an additional four months.

On 20 March 1993, Attorney General Ramón Escovar Salom introduced an action against President Pérez for the embezzlement of 250 million bolivars belonging to a presidential discretionary fund, or partida secreta. The issue had originally been brought to public scrutiny in November 1992 by journalist José Vicente Rangel. Pérez and his supporters claim the money was used to support the electoral process in Nicaragua. On 20 May 1993, the Supreme Court considered the accusation valid, and the following day the Senate voted to strip Pérez of his immunity. Pérez refused to resign, but after the maximum 90 days of temporary leave available to the President under Article 188 of the 1961 constitution, the National Congress removed Pérez from office permanently on 31 August.

In 1997, Pro Calidad de Vida, a Venezuelan NGO, claimed that around $100 billion from oil revenue had been misused in the preceding 25 years, according to the Cato Institute.

=== Bolivarian Revolution (1999–present) ===
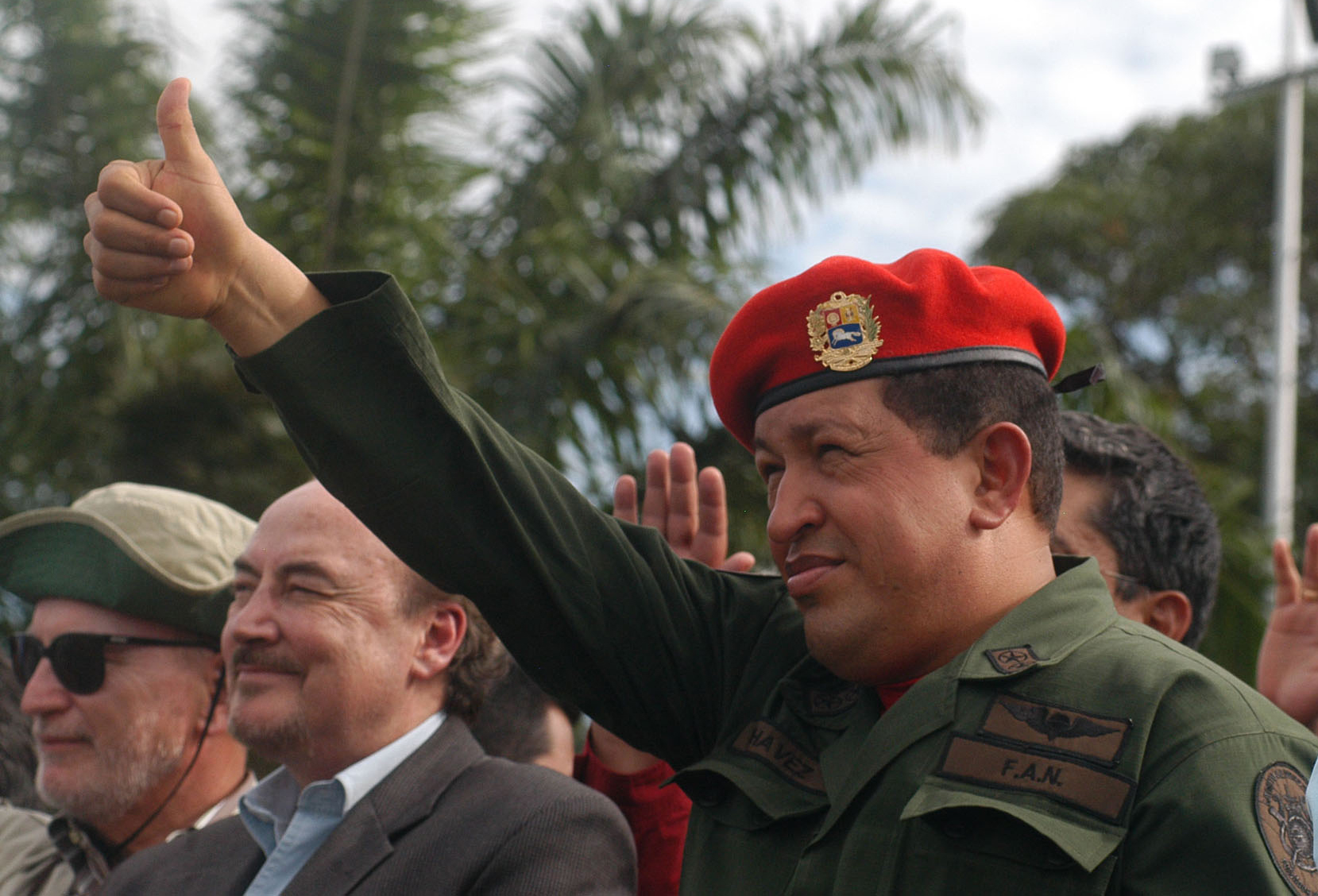
Hugo Chávez wearing standard military fatigues in 2010.

According to Foreign Policy, Venezuela's corruption helped Hugo Chávez gain power and worsened under the Bolivarian government. Though the Bolivarian government states that they have implemented strict guidelines and laws to deter corruption, enforcement of such anti-corruption laws has been weak following the centralizing powers in the government, creating less accountability for corruption and making it prevalent throughout Venezuela.

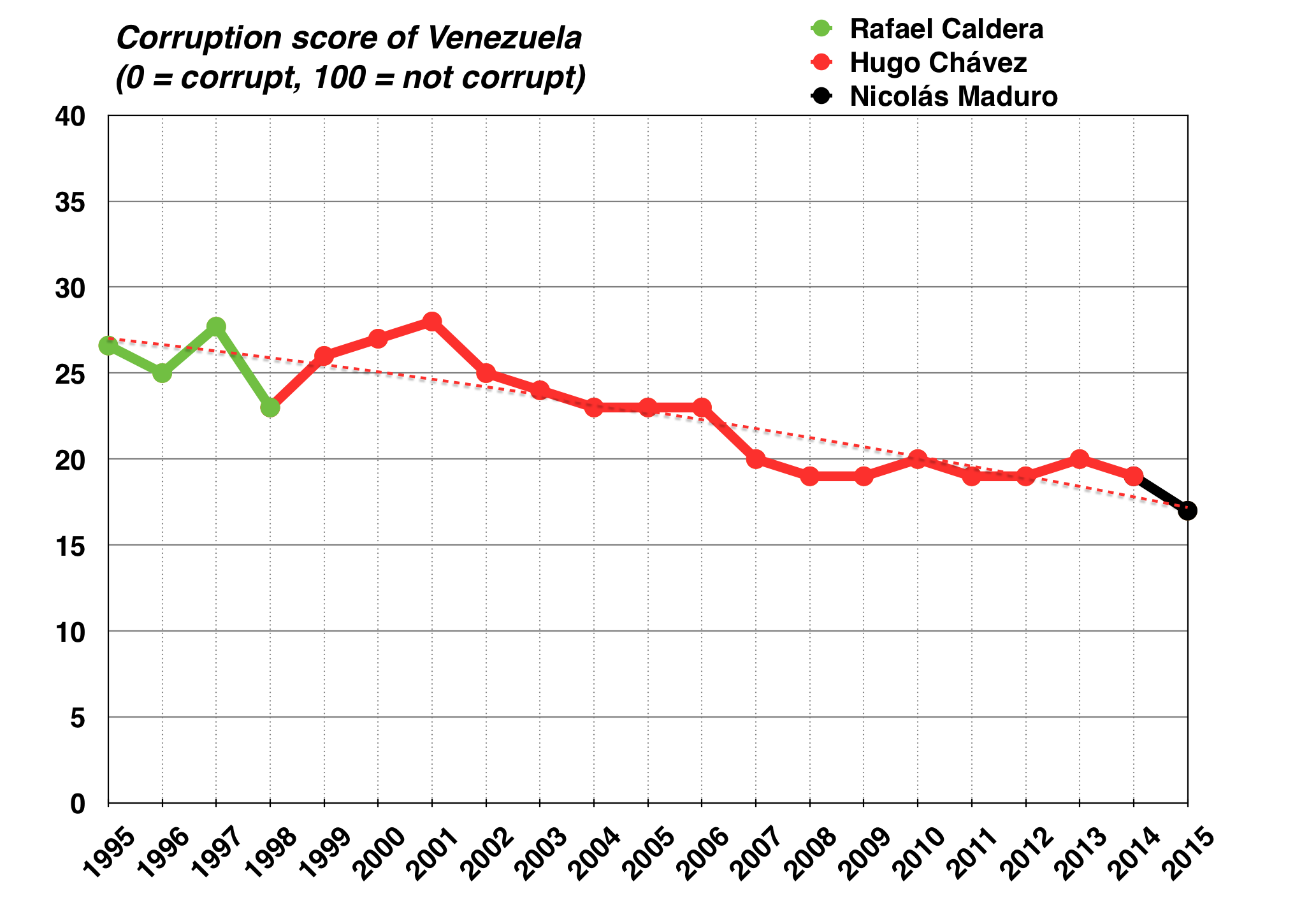
Corruption score according to the Corruption Perceptions Index. Source: Transparency International

==== Hugo Chávez (1999–2013) ====
In December 1998, Hugo Chávez declared three goals for the new government; "convening a constituent assembly to write a new constitution, eliminating government corruption, and fighting against social exclusion and poverty". However, during Hugo Chávez's time in power, corruption became widespread throughout the government due to impunity towards members of the government, bribes and the lack of transparency, according to the Cato Institute. In 2004, Hugo Chávez and his allies took over the Supreme Court, filling it with supporters of Chávez and made new measures so the government could dismiss justices from the court. According to the Cato Institute, the National Electoral Council of Venezuela was under the control of Chávez where he tried to "push a constitutional reform that would have allowed him unlimited opportunities for reelection". Some criticisms of corruption came from Chávez's own supporters, with Chávez's initial political party, the Fifth Republic Movement (MVR), being criticized as being riddled with the same cronyism, political patronage, and corruption that Chávez alleged were characteristic of the old "Fourth Republic" political parties.

The Corruption Perceptions Index, produced annually by the NGO Transparency International (TNI) ranked Venezuela among the most corrupt countries in the world in 2012, placing it 165th out of 176 countries.

===== Public funds =====
In early 2000, Chávez's friend and co-conspirator in the 1992 Venezuelan coup d'état attempts Jesús Urdaneta was appointed head of Venezuela's intelligence agency, DISIP. Urdaneta began receiving reports that Chávez's allies, Luis Miquilena, leader of the National Assembly and José Vicente Rangel, Chávez's foreign minister, were keeping public funds for themselves. Urdaneta brought this to Chávez's attention, but Chávez ignored his advice saying that he needed the political experience of both men in order to establish power.

$22.5 billion of public funds have been transferred from Venezuela to foreign accounts with half of that money being unaccounted for by anyone, according to the Cato Institute. José Guerra, a former Central Bank executive, claims that most of that money has been used to buy political allies in countries such as Cuba and Bolivia, according to the Cato Institute. Chávez reportedly made promises and carried out most payments of nearly US$70 billion to foreign leaders without consultation with the people of Venezuela and without normal legal procedures, according to the Cato Institute.

===== Maletinazo scandal =====
In August 2007, Antonini Wilson, a self-identified member of the entourage of Hugo Chávez, who was about to visit Argentina, arrived in Argentina on a private flight paid for by Argentine and Venezuelan state officials. Wilson was carrying US$800,000 in cash, which the police seized on arrival. A few days later Wilson, a Venezuelan-American and a close friend of Chávez's, was a guest at a signing ceremony involving Cristina Kirchner and Chávez at the Casa Rosada. He was later arrested on money laundering and contraband charges. It was alleged that the cash was to have been delivered to the Kirchner's as a clandestine contribution to Cristina's campaign chest from President Chávez. Fernández, as a fellow leftist, was a political ally of Chávez. This was seen as a similar move that Chávez allegedly used to give payments to leftist candidates in presidential races for Bolivia and Mexico in order to back his anti-US allies. The incident led to a scandal, which Bloomberg News called "an international imbroglio," with the U.S. accusing five men of being secret Chávez agents whose mission was to cover up the attempt to deliver the cash.

According to the United States Department of Defense's PRISM journal, the $800,000 in cash may have also been a payment from Iran to Cristina Kirchner. It was alleged that Chávez helped a deal for Iran to obtain nuclear technology from Argentina and to cover up the AMIA bombing information, with Venezuela also purchasing Argentine debt in the dealing. Iranian and Argentine relations improved shortly after the incident.

===== PDVAL affair =====
In mid-2010, tons of rotten food supplies imported during Chávez's government through subsidies of state-owned enterprise PDVAL were found. Due to the scandal, PDVAL started being administrated by the Vicepresidency of Venezuela and afterwards by the Alimentation Ministry. Three former managers were detained, but were released afterwards and two of them had their positions restored. In July 2010, official estimates stated that 130,000 tons of food supplies were affected, while the political opposition informed of 170,000 tons. As of 2012, any advances in the investigations by the National Assembly were unknown. The most accepted explanation for the loss of food supplies is the organization of PDVAL, because the food network allegedly imported supplies faster than what it could distribute them. The opposition considers the affair as a corrupt case and spokespeople have assured that the public officials deliberately imported more food that could be distributed to embezzle funds through the import of subsidized supplies.

==== Nicolás Maduro (2013–present) ====
The government in place following the Bolivarian Revolution that was initiated by Hugo Chávez has been frequently accused of corruption, abuse of the economy for personal gain, spreading "Bolivarian propaganda", buying the loyalty of the military, officials involved in the drug trade, assisting terrorists, intimidation of the media, and human rights abuses of its citizens.

Chávez's successor, Nicolás Maduro was criticized for allowing corruption to remain in the government. In an article by The Washington Post, Venezuela's dire situation under Maduro was described as "a man-made disaster". The Bolivarian government was also seen as "a gangster state that doesn't know how to do anything other than sell drugs and steal money for itself" since Maduro's family members and close government officials were accused of being involved in the illicit drug trade.

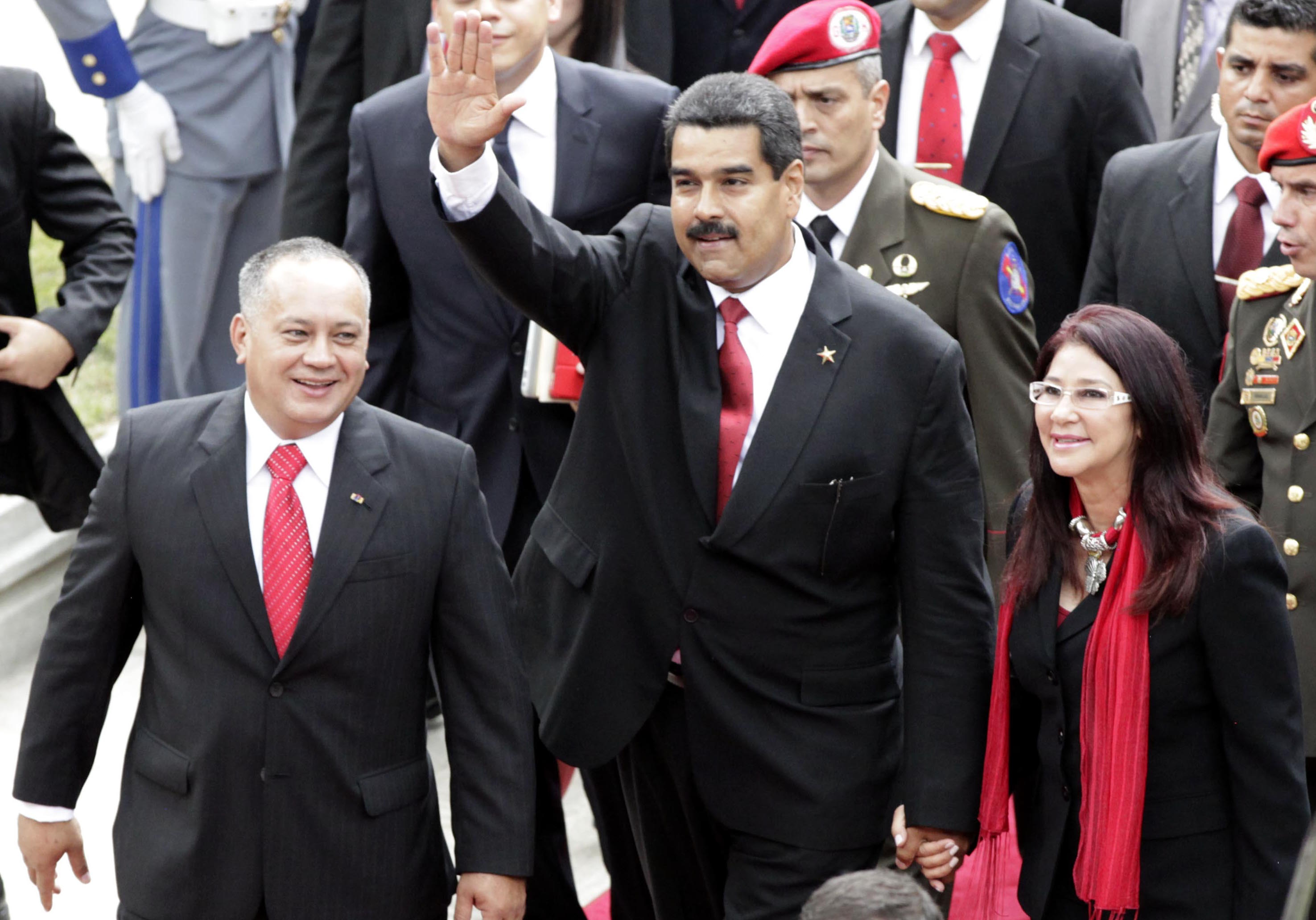
Diosdado Cabello beside Nicolás Maduro and his wife, Cilia Flores.

A 2013 survey by TNI found that 68% of those believed that the government's efforts to fight corruption were ineffective; a majority of those surveyed said the government's effort against corruption were ineffective, that corruption had increased from 2007 to 2010, and perceived political parties, the judiciary, the parliament and the police to be the institutions most affected by corruption. In 2014, the World Justice Project ranked Venezuela's government in 99th place worldwide and gave it the worst ranking of countries in Latin America according to the Rule of Law Index 2014 and in 2015, the World Justice Project's Rule of Law Index 2015 report placed Venezuela as having the worst rule of law in the world, with the majority of Venezuelans believing that the Venezuelan government was not held accountable under the law, was corrupt, lacked transparency and did not respect the privacy of citizens.

"It's been a big year for Maduro ... I think this year has been the tipping point and his negligence, incompetence and corruption are the cause. When a country's leader can watch his people starve and still oversee a government stealing $70 billion a year all while his family deals drugs, it's a special kind of evil. He deserves this prize.

— Drew Sullivan, co-founder of OCCRP

Allegations have been made that President Nicolás Maduro had cooperated with the Islamist militant group, Hezbollah as well as the Syrian government to receive funds.

In 2016, the Organized Crime and Corruption Reporting Project (OCCRP), an international non-governmental organization that investigates crime and corruption, gave President Maduro the Person of the Year Award that "recognizes the individual who has done the most in the world to advance organized criminal activity and corruption". The OCCRP stated that they "chose Maduro for the global award on the strength of his corrupt and oppressive reign, so rife with mismanagement that citizens of his oil-rich nation are literally starving and begging for medicines" and that Maduro and his family steal millions of dollars from government coffers to fund patronage that maintains President Maduro's power in Venezuela. The group also explains how Maduro had overruled the legislative branch filled with opposition politicians, repressed citizen protests and had relatives involved in drug trafficking.

In early 2019, Bulgarian officials disclosed that millions of Euros were transferred from a Venezuelan oil company to a small Bulgarian bank, Investbank, after disclosing an investigation into suspected money laundering. The Bulgarian government had frozen accounts at the bank, and was looking into accounts at other institutions. The Bulgarian government has frozen accounts at the bank. US Ambassador to Bulgaria Eric Rubin confirmed that the US government "[was] working very closely with Bulgaria and other members of the European Union to ensure that the wealth of the people of Venezuela [was] not stolen". Bulgarian authorities reacted only after they were prompted by the US government. According to legal scholar Radosveta Vassileva, "multiple questions arise about the efficiency of Bulgarian secret services and the anti-money laundering protocols in the Investbank." Investbank was one of six Bulgarian banks, that the European Central Bank assessed to evaluate if Bulgaria was making progress towards joining the Eurozone.

In 2023, Transparencia Venezuela announced that the amount of money in judicial cases of 26 different countries investigating chavismo corruption amounted to at least $70 billion dollars.

===== Diosdado Cabello =====
Information presented to the United States State Department by Stratfor claimed that Diosdado Cabello was "head of one of the major centers of corruption in Venezuela." A Wikileaked U.S. Embassy cable from 2009 characterized Cabello as a "major pole" of corruption within the regime, describing him as "amassing great power and control over the regime's apparatus as well as a private fortune, often through intimidation behind the scenes." The communiqué likewise created speculation that "Chavez himself might be concerned about Cabello's growing influence but unable to diminish it."

He is described by a contributor to The Atlantic as the "Frank Underwood" of Venezuela under whose watch the National Assembly of Venezuela has made a habit of ignoring constitutional hurdles entirely—at various times preventing opposition members from speaking in session, suspending their salaries, stripping particularly problematic legislators of parliamentary immunity, and, on one occasion, even presiding over the physical beating of unfriendly lawmakers while the assembly was meeting. There are currently at least 17 formal corruption allegations lodged against Cabello in Venezuela's prosecutor's office. His figurehead Rafael Sarría, was investigated and deported from the US in 2010.

====== Derwick Associates bribes ======
In 2014, Cabello was charged by a court in Miami, Florida of accepting bribes from Derwick Associates including a $50 million payment. These bribes were reportedly made so Derwick Associates could get public contracts from the Venezuelan government. Derwick Associates denied the charges stating that the allegations against themselves and Cabello are untrue and that they had no financial relationship with Cabello. Banesco also denied the allegations, calling them a lie.

====== Colectivos organization ======
Cabello, along with Freddy Bernal and Eliezer Otaiza, have been accused of directing colectivos by organizing and paying them with money from the funds of Petróleos de Venezuela.

===== Ramón Rodríguez Chacín =====
Ramón Rodríguez Chacín took part in the 1992 Coup d'état attempts and later became involved in Venezuelan politics under the government of Hugo Chávez. The German magazine Der Spiegel reported in 2008 that Rodriguez Chacín was a frequent guest at FARC camps in Colombia and that Hugo Chávez had assigned him the task of managing communications with FARC. In September 2008, The U.S. Department of the Treasury accused Rodriguez Chacín of materially assisting FARC's narcotics trafficking activities. The Venezuelan government responded to these allegations saying he was not guilty of those charges. US intelligence officials claimed that in an email between Rodriguez Chacín and the FARC leadership, Rodriguez Chacín asked to train Venezuela's military in guerrilla tactics as preparation in case the United States invaded the area. They also claimed that regarding an alleged 250 million dollar Venezuelan loan to buy weapons, Rodriguez Chacín wrote: "don't think of it as a loan, think of it as solidarity". The source for these documents was allegedly a 2008 cross-border raid by the Colombian military into Ecuador which destroyed a FARC camp. Venezuelan Ambassador to the United States Bernardo Álvarez Herrera stated, "We don't recognized [sic] the validity of any of these documents... They are false, and an attempt to discredit the Venezuelan government."

==== Drug trafficking ====
Never has a country that should have been so rich been so poor ... It's a gangster state that doesn't know how to do anything other than sell drugs and steal money for itself ... Venezuela is the answer to what would happen if an economically illiterate drug cartel took over a country. This corruption hasn't just enriched the few. It has also impoverished the many.

— Matt O'Brien of The Washington Post, 2016

According to Jackson Diehl, Deputy Editorial Page Editor of The Washington Post, the Bolivarian government of Venezuela shelters "one of the world's biggest drug cartels". There have been allegations of former president Hugo Chávez being involved with drug trafficking and at the time of the arrest of Nicolás Maduro and Cilia Flores' nephews in November 2015, multiple high-ranking members of the Venezuelan government were also being investigated for their involvement of drug trafficking, including Walter Jacobo Gavidia, Flores' son who is a Caracas judge, National Assembly President Diosdado Cabello, and Governor of Aragua State Tarek El Aissami.

In May 2015, The Wall Street Journal reported from United States officials that drug trafficking in Venezuela increased significantly with Colombian drug traffickers moving from Colombia to Venezuela due to pressure from law enforcement. One United States Department of Justice official described the higher ranks of the Venezuelan government and military as "a criminal organization", with high-ranking Venezuelan officials, such as National Assembly President Diosdado Cabello, being accused of drug trafficking. Those involved with investigations stated that Venezuelan government defectors and former traffickers had given information to investigators and that details of those involved in government drug trafficking were increasing. Anti-drug authorities have also accused some Venezuelan officials of working with Mexican drug cartels.

===== Hugo Chávez government =====
In the early-2000s, Hugo Chávez's relationship with FARC caused uneasiness among the military in Venezuela. In January 2005, intelligence firm Stratfor reported that the controversial arrest of Rodrigo Granda in December 2004 showed Chávez's support of the FARC after he was allegedly put under pressure from FARC and due to Granda's Venezuelan citizenship being granted before Chávez's involvement in the 2004 Venezuela recall elections, with the Venezuelan citizenship granting Granda "a base of operations" to perform illicit operations internationally. In May 2006, the head of Venezuelan Military Intelligence, Hugo Carvajal, was allegedly at a meeting with Germán Briceño Suárez "Grannobles", a FARC Commander of the Eastern Bloc of the FARC-EP, with the meeting's perimeter protected by members of the Venezuelan National Guard, Venezuelan Military Intelligence and Bolivarian Intelligence Service. The meeting between Carvajal and Briceño Suárez involved talks about logistical and political support while also creating plans to meet with Chávez. Chávez's former bodyguard Leamsy Salazar stated in Bumerán Chávez that Chávez met with the high command of FARC in 2007 somewhere in rural Venezuela. Chávez created a system in which the FARC would provide the Venezuelan government with drugs that would be transported in live cattle across the Venezuelan-Colombian border while the FARC would receive money and weaponry from the Venezuelan government after receiving the drugs. According to Salazar, this was done in order to weaken Colombian President Álvaro Uribe, an enemy of Chávez.

In 2008, the U.S. Department of Treasury accused two senior Venezuelan government officials Hugo Carvajal and Henry Rangel Silva and one former official, Ramon Rodriguez Chacin, of providing material assistance for drug-trafficking operations carried out by the FARC guerrilla group in Colombia. According to Colombian weekly Semana, Hugo Carvajal, the director of the Dirección General de Inteligencia Militar (DGIM), the Venezuelan agency in charge of Military Intelligence, was also involved in supporting FARC drug trafficking and was only under the command of Hugo Chávez. Carvajal had allegedly protected and given forged IDs to Colombian drug traffickers and was supposedly involved in the torture and execution of captives. In a 2009 United States Congress report, it was stated that corruption in the Venezuelan armed forces was facilitating Colombian FARC guerillas' drug trafficking.

In a 2011 article by The New York Times, Colonel Adel Mashmoushi, Lebanon's drug enforcement chief, stated that flights between Venezuela and Syria that were operated by Iran could have been used by Hezbollah to transport drugs into the Middle East. According to long-time serving New York district attorney Robert Morgenthau, high-ranking Venezuelan officials turned Venezuela to "a global cocaine hub" and his office had found that cocaine in New York was linked to Venezuela, Iran and Hezbollah. Morgenthau also explained how Hugo Chávez's government allegedly assisted Iran with drug trafficking so Iran could circumvent sanctions and fund their development of nuclear weapons and other armaments.

In March 2012, Venezuela's National Assembly removed Supreme Court Justice Eladio Aponte Aponte from his post after an investigation revealed alleged ties to drug trafficking. On the day he was to face questioning, Aponte Aponte fled the country, and has sought refuge in the U.S., where he began to cooperate with the Drug Enforcement Administration (DEA) and the Department of Justice. Aponte says that, while serving as a judge, he was forced to acquit an army commander who had connections with a 2 metric-ton shipment of cocaine. Aponte also claimed that Henry Rangel, former defense minister of Venezuela, and General Clíver Alcalá Cordones were involved in the drug trade.

==== Nicolás Maduro government ====
In September 2013, an incident involving men from the Venezuelan National Guard placing 31 suitcases containing 1.3 tons of cocaine on a Paris flight astonished French authorities. Months later on 15 February 2014, a commander for the Guard was stopped while driving to Valencia with his family and was arrested for having 554 kilos of cocaine in his possession.

On 22 July 2014, Hugo Carvajal, former head of Venezuelan military intelligence that was involved with the 2008 allegations of being involved with the FARC, was detained in Aruba, despite having been admitted on a diplomatic passport and being named consul general to Aruba in January 2014. The arrest was carried out following a formal request by the U.S. government, which accuses Carvajal of ties to drug trafficking and to the FARC guerrilla group. On 27 July, Carvajal was released after authorities decided he had diplomatic immunity, but was also considered persona non-grata.

In January 2015, the former security chief of both Hugo Chavez and Diosdado Cabello, Leamsy Salazar, made accusations that Cabello was involved in the drug trade. Salazar was placed in witness protection, fleeing to the United States with the assistance of the Drug Enforcement Administration's Special Operations Division after cooperating with the administration and providing possible details on Cabello's involvement with the international drug trade. Salazar claims that Cabello is the leader of the Cartel of the Suns, an alleged military drug trafficking organization in Venezuela. Salazar stated that he saw Cabello give orders on transporting tons of cocaine. The shipments of drugs were reportedly sent from FARC in Colombia and sent to the United States and Europe, with the possible assistance of Cuba. The alleged international drug operation had possibly involved senior members of Venezuela's government as well.

On 18 May 2015, The Wall Street Journal reported from sources in the United States Department of Justice that there was "extensive evidence to justify that Cabello is one of the heads, if not the head, of the cartel" and that he is "certainly is a main target" of investigations being conducted by the Drug Enforcement Administration involving drug trafficking in Venezuela. Days before the article, Cabello had already ordered a travel ban on 22 journalists and executives for distributing reports about his alleged participation in the drug trade. Days later on 23 May 2015, former Supreme Tribunal of Justice judge Miriam Morandy was seen arriving at Maiquetia International Airport with alleged drug kingpin Richard José Cammarano Jaime and her assistant Tibisay Pacheco to board a TAP-Air Portugal flight to Portugal. While leaving their taxi, Morandy, Cammarano and Pacheco were arrested for drug trafficking. Morandy was released shortly thereafter while Cammarano was still detained.

Diosdado Cabello has been accused of being involved in the illegal drug trade in Venezuela and was accused of being a leader of the Cartel of the Suns. On 18 May 2015, The Wall Street Journal reported from sources in the United States Department of Justice that there was "extensive evidence to justify that Cabello is one of the heads, if not the head, of the cartel" and that he is "certainly is a main target" of investigations being conducted by the Drug Enforcement Administration involving drug trafficking in Venezuela.

===== Narcosobrinos incident =====
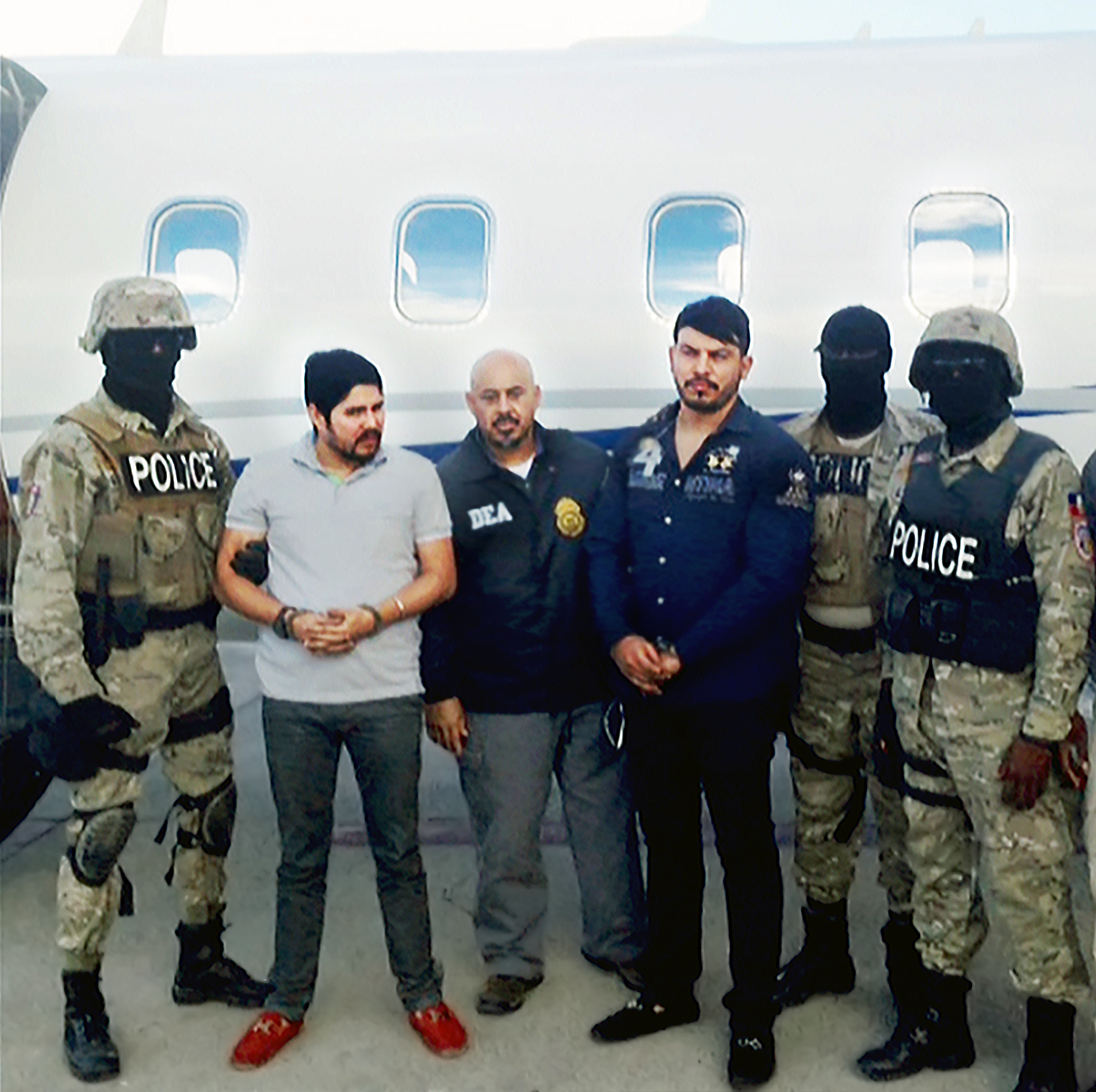
The nephews of President Maduro, Efraín Antonio Campo Flores and Francisco Flores de Freitas, after their arrest by the United States Drug Enforcement Administration on 10 November 2015.

In October and November 2015, the Drug Enforcement Administration (DEA) began monitoring two nephews of President Nicolás Maduro's wife Cilia Flores—Efraín Antonio Campo Flores and Francisco Flores de Freites—after the two had contacted a person who was a DEA informant. They wanted advice on how to traffic cocaine. They brought to the meeting a kilogram of the drug so that the informant could understand its quality. On 10 November 2015, Campo Flores and Flores de Freites, were arrested in Port-au-Prince, Haiti by local police while attempting to make a deal to transport 800 kilograms of cocaine destined for New York City and were turned over to the DEA where they were flown directly to the United States. The men flew from a hangar reserved for the President of Venezuela in Simón Bolívar International Airport into Haiti while being assisted by Venezuelan military personnel, which included two presidential honor guards, with the nephews carrying Venezuelan diplomatic passports which did not have diplomatic immunity according to the former head of DEA international operations Michael Vigil. A later raid of Efraín Antonio Campo Flores' "Casa de Campo" mansion and yacht in the Dominican Republic revealed an additional 280 lbs of cocaine and 22 lbs of heroin, with 176 lbs of the drugs found in the home while the remainder was discovered in his yacht.

Campo stated on the DEA plane that he was the stepson of President Maduro and that he grew up in the Maduro household while being raised by Maduro's wife, Cilia Flores. When the two learned that they did not have diplomatic immunity, they began to give names of those involved, allegedly naming former National Assembly President Diosdado Cabello, and Governor of Aragua State Tarek El Aissami. It is expected that without cooperating with investigators, Maduro's nephews could face between 20 and 30 years in prison. Due to the extradition process, New York courts could not apprehend those who assisted the nephews on their way to Haiti. The incident happened at a time when multiple high-ranking members of the Venezuelan government were being investigated for their involvement in drug trafficking, including Walter Jacobo Gavidia, Flores' son who is a Caracas judge, as well as Diosdado Cabello and Tarek El Aissami. It was also stated by those close to the case that there are more sealed warrants linked to the incident.

A month later on 15 December 2015, United States prosecutors in Brooklyn said that they would prosecute General Nestor Reverol, head of the Venezuelan National Guard and former head of the Venezuelan Oficina Nacional Antidrogas who was close to Hugo Chávez, as well as Edilberto Molina, a National Guard general and former anti-drug official, of conspiring the shipment of cocaine into the United States. Venezuela's Defense Minister Vladimir Padrino as well as the Venezuelan National Guard replied to the charges by sending out a group of Tweets in defense of Reverol.

A year later on 18 November 2016, the two nephews were found guilty, with the cash allegedly destined to "help their family stay in power". On 14 December 2017, the two were sentenced to 18 years of imprisonment.

Maduro's nephews were freed in October 2022 as a prisoner swap for seven American directors of the oil refinery corporation CITGO (part of the Citgo Six) who were imprisoned in Venezuela.

Two nephews of Maduro's wife Cilia Flores, Efraín Antonio Campos Flores and Francisco Flores de Freites have been involved in illicit activities such as drug trafficking, with some of their funds allegedly assisting President Maduro's presidential campaign in the 2013 Venezuelan presidential election potentially for the 2015 Venezuelan parliamentary elections. One informant stated that the two would often fly out of Terminal 4 of Simon Bolivar Airport, a terminal reserved for the president.

==== Government assistance of terrorist organizations ====
===== FARC =====
Before the 2002 coup attempt, discontent within the military was created when Chávez forced them to assist the FARC, a militant Colombian guerrilla group involved in the illegal drug trade, with setting up camps in Venezuelan territories, providing ammunition to fight the Colombian government, supplying ID cards so they could move freely through Venezuela and sending members of Bolivarian Circles to their camps to receive guerilla training. The International Institute for Strategic Studies (IISS) accused Chavez's government of funding FARC's Caracas office and giving it access to intelligence services, and said that during the 2002 coup attempt that, "FARC also responded to requests from (Venezuela's intelligence service) to provide training in urban terrorism involving targeted killings and the use of explosives." Venezuelan diplomats denounced the IISS' findings saying that they had "basic inaccuracies".

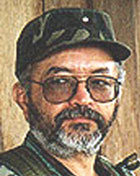
Raúl Reyes of the FARC

In 2007, authorities in Colombia claimed that through laptops they had seized on a raid against Raúl Reyes, they found documents purporting to show that Hugo Chávez offered payments of as much as $300 million to the FARC "among other financial and political ties that date back years" and documents showing the FARC rebels sought Venezuelan assistance in acquiring surface-to-air missiles, and alleging that Chavez met personally with rebel leaders. According to Interpol, the files found by Colombian forces were considered to be authentic.

Independent analyses of the documents by a number of U.S. academics and journalists have challenged the Colombian interpretation of the documents, accusing the Colombian government of exaggerating their contents. According to Greg Palast, the claim about Chavez's $300 million is based on the following (translated) sentence: "With relation to the 300, which from now on we will call 'dossier', efforts are now going forward at the instructions of the cojo [slang term for 'cripple'], which I will explain in a separate note." The separate note is allegedly speaking of a hostage exchange with the FARC that Chavez was supposedly helping to negotiate at that time. Palast suggests that the "300" is supposedly a reference to "300 prisoners" (the number involved in a FARC prisoner exchange) and not "300 million".

In 2008, the U.S. Department of Treasury accused two senior Venezuelan government officials and one former official of providing material assistance for drug-trafficking operations carried out by the FARC guerrilla group in Colombia. Later that year, the Secretary General of the Organization of American States, Jose Miguel Insulza, testified before the U.S. Congress that "there are no evidences [sic]" that Venezuela is supporting "terrorist groups", including the FARC.

===== Hezbollah and others =====
Information regarding the sale of Venezuelan passports to foreign individuals became available in 2003. Since 2006, the United States Congress has been aware of fraud regarding Venezuelan passports. The Venezuelan government has allegedly had a long-term relationship with the Islamic militant group Hezbollah. In 2006 following the 2006 Lebanon War, Hezbollah leader Hassan Nasrallah thanked President Hugo Chávez for his support, calling Chávez his "brother". Chávez also allowed members of Hezbollah to stay in Venezuela and allegedly used Venezuelan embassies in the Middle East to launder money. President Nicolas Maduro has continued the relationship with Hezbollah and called for their assistance during the 2014–15 Venezuelan protests.

===== Statements by the United States on Venezuela's assistance =====
Members of the Venezuelan government were also accused of providing financial aid to Hezbollah by the United States Department of the Treasury, which included Charge d' Affaires of the Venezuelan Embassy in Damascus, Syria Ghazi Nasr Al-Din. According to the testimony of a former Assistant Secretary of State for Western Hemisphere Affairs of the United States Department of State Roger Noriega, Hugo Chávez's government gave "indispensable support" to Iran and Hezbollah in the Western Hemisphere. In an article by the conservative think tank American Enterprise Institute, Noriega states that two witnesses have told him that Ghazi Nasr Al-Din, a Venezuelan diplomat in Syria, was an operative of Hezbollah who used Venezuelan entities to launder money for Hezbollah with President Maduro's personal approval.

In a Fox News Sunday interview on 13 August 2017 with Director of the CIA Mike Pompeo, the director stated regarding Venezuela that "the Iranians, Hezbollah are there".

The Trump Administration proposed on 19 November 2018 to list Venezuela as a state sponsor of terrorism.

===== Other research on Venezuela's assistance =====
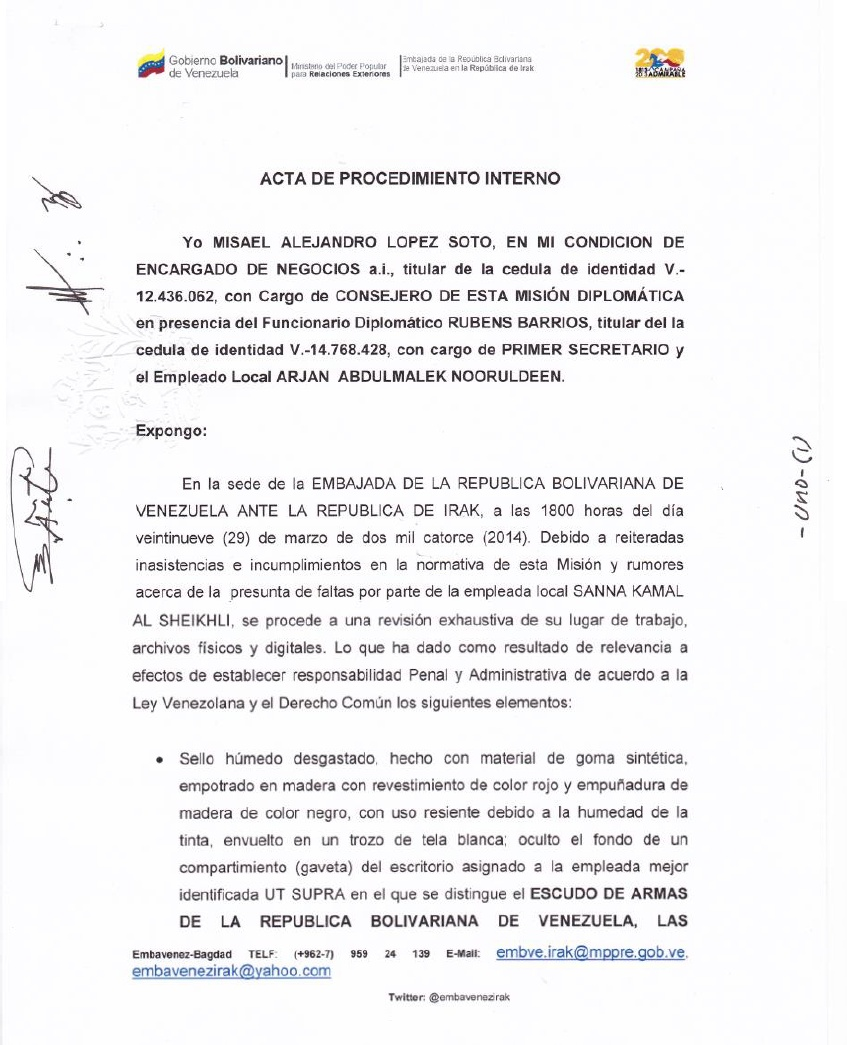
Part of a document sent by Misael López Soto to his superiors regarding irregularities at the Embassy of Venezuela in Iraq.

In 2003, General Marcos Ferreira, head of Venezuela's Department of Immigration and Foreigners (DIEX) from 2002 (departing after having supported the failed coup against Chavez), stated that Ramón Rodríguez Chacín asked him to allow militants from Colombia, Hezbollah and Al Qaeda to cross borders into Venezuela and that in a three-year timeframe, 2,520 Colombians and 279 "Syrians" became citizens of Venezuela.

In a study by the Center for a Secure Free Society (SFS), at least 173 people from the Middle East were caught with Venezuelan documentation. The SFS believes that the documentation was provided by the Venezuelan government, and states that 70% of the people came from Iran, Lebanon and Syria "and had some connection with Hezbollah". The majority allegedly had Venezuelan passports, IDs, visas and in some cases, even Venezuelan birth certificates. Anthony Daquin, former security advisor involved in the modernization of the Venezuelan identity system stated in the report that the Venezuelan government will "be able to issue the Venezuelan document without any problem, from the University of Computer Sciences, because they have the equipment and supplies, including polycarbonate sheets, electronic signature that goes into passports and encryption certificates, which are those that allow the chip to be read at the airports". One of the key figures of the Venezuelan government noted in the SFS report was the Lebanese born former Minister of the Interior, Tarek El Aissami, who allegedly "developed a sophisticated financial network and multi-level networks as a criminal-terrorist pipeline to bring Islamic militants to Venezuela and neighboring countries, and to send illicit funds from Latin America to the Middle East". The alleged "pipeline" consists of 40 shell companies which have bank accounts in Venezuela, Panama, Curacao, St. Lucia, Miami and Lebanon. Tarek El Aissami's father Zaidan El Amin El Aissami, was the leader of a small Ba'athist party in Venezuela. Former Vice President José Vicente Rangel who served under Hugo Chavez denounced the SFS study stating that it was a "combined campaign" by SFS and the Canadian government to attack Venezuela, though Ben Rowswell, the Canadian ambassador in Venezuela, denied the accusations by Rangel.

In 2015, Spanish journalist Emili Blasco released Bumerán Chávez, a book investigating allegations from high-ranking Chavista whistleblowers. According to former Finance Minister Rafael Isea, while President Nicolás Maduro was Chávez's foreign minister, Maduro was present at a 2007 meeting in Damascus with Hezbollah Secretary General Hassan Nasrallah that was set up by former Iranian President Mahmoud Ahmadinejad. Isea arrived in Damascus and a Syrian security officer escorted Isea to Maduro where he was waiting at a hotel. The two then met with the Hezbollah leader and Maduro promoted Venezuelan diplomat Ghazi Atef Nassereddine, an individual who supposedly raised money for Hezbollah in Latin America. Maduro made other negotiations with Nasrallah and allowed 300 Hezbollah members "to fundraise in Venezuela".

In February 2017, CNN reported in their article, Venezuelan Passports, in the Wrong Hands?, an investigation performed focusing on the sale of Venezuelan passports to individuals in the Middle East, specifically Syria, Palestine, Iraq and Pakistan. According to Misael López Soto, a former employee at the Venezuelan embassy in Iraq who was also a lawyer and CICPC officer, the Bolivarian government would sell authentic passports to individuals from the Middle East, with the Venezuelan passport able to access 130 countries throughout the world without a visa requirement. López provided CNN documents showing how his superiors attempted to cover up the sale of passports, which were being sold from $5,000 to $15,000 per passport. López Soto fled the Venezuelan embassy in Iraq in 2015 to meet with the FBI in Spain, with a Venezuelan official who assisted him in flying out of the country being killed the same day. The investigation also found that between 2008 and 2012, Tareck El Aissami ordered hundreds of Middle Eastern individuals to obtain illegal passports, including members of Hezbollah.

Following the report, CNN was expelled from Venezuela and the Venezuelan government accused the channel of being "(A threat to) the peace and democratic stability of our Venezuelan people since they generate an environment of intolerance."

==== Kleptocracy ====
InSight Crime states that state funds "have been pillaged on an industrial scale by the Bolivarian elite" and that "kleptocracy has certainly been one of the main factors that has brought Venezuela to the edge of economic collapse and bankruptcy". Price controls introduced by President Chávez in 2003 helped establish kleptocratic practices that still occur in Venezuela today, allowing officials to buy dollars for cheap and then exchange them bolívares at a higher black market rate so they could exchange for more dollars.

It has been estimated that between the mid-2000s and the mid-2010s, over $300 billion was misused by the Bolivarian government. The opposition-led National Assembly estimated that about $87 billion had been embezzled between multiple projects, including $27 billion by the Ministry of Food, $25 billion by the Ministry of Electricity, $22 billion for unfinished transportation works $11 billion by PDVSA and $1.5 billion by the Ministry of Health.

===== Petróleos de Venezuela, S.A. (PDVSA) =====
Bloomberg states that "Chávez's ascent to power also brought about corruption on a scale never before seen at PDVSA". In 2016, it was revealed that from 2004 to 2014, $11 billion was funneled out of PDVSA, with billions of dollars "paid for fraudulent contracts for oil rigs, ships, and refineries". United States officials believe that the Bolivarian government has used PDVSA to launder money for Colombian guerrillas and help them traffic cocaine through Venezuela.

==== Cronyism and patronage ====
===== Boliburguesía =====
Boliburguesía is a term describing the new bourgeois created by the Venezuelan government of Hugo Chávez and Chavismo, made up of people who became rich under the Chavez administration. The term was coined by journalist Juan Carlos Zapata, to "define the oligarchy that has developed under the protection of the Chávez government". Corruption among the Boliburguesía and Chavez-administration sympathizers has moved millions of dollars with the complicity of public officials, with some becoming rich under the guise of socialism. The general secretary of the opposition party Acción Democrática says that corruption in the financial industry and other sectors was tied to functionaries of the administration.

During Hugo Chávez's tenure, he seized thousands of properties and businesses while also reducing the footprint of foreign companies. Venezuela's economy was then largely state-run and was operated by military officers who had their business and government affairs connected. Senior fellow at the Brookings Institution, Harold Trinkunas, stated that involving the military in business was "a danger", with Trinkunas explaining that the Venezuelan military "has the greatest ability to coerce people, into business like they have". According to Bloomberg Markets Magazine, "[b]y showering contracts on former military officials and pro-government business executives, Chávez put a new face on the system of patronage".

===== Government-owned companies =====
According to USA Today, the policies of Chávez's "Socialism for the 21st century" included "the bloating of state oil company Petróleos de Venezuela S.A., or PDVSA, with patronage hires" which led to mismanagement of the petroleum industry in Venezuela according to experts. Financial Times also called the PDVSA "a source of patronage" and that "the number of employees, hired on the basis of their loyalty to the 'Bolivarian Revolution', has tripled since 2003 to more than 121,000".

In 2006, Rafael Ramírez, then energy minister, gave PDVSA workers a choice: Support President Hugo Chávez, or lose their jobs. The minister also said: "PDVSA is red [the color identified with Chávez's political party], red from top to bottom". Chávez defended Ramírez, saying that public workers should back the "revolution". He added that "PDVSA's workers are with this revolution, and those who aren't should go somewhere else. Go to Miami". PDVSA continues to hire only supporters of the president, and a large amount of its revenue is used to fund political projects.

==== Governorships ====
Under both Chávez and Maduro, if Bolivarian candidates lost gubernatorial elections, the presidents would name the candidates "Protectors" to act as governors of the state, an action that is non-existent in Venezuelan law. Chávez and Maduro would instead recognize the "Protectors" and provide funds to establish a parallel government to opposition governors who were elected.

===== Local Committees of Supply and Production (CLAP) =====
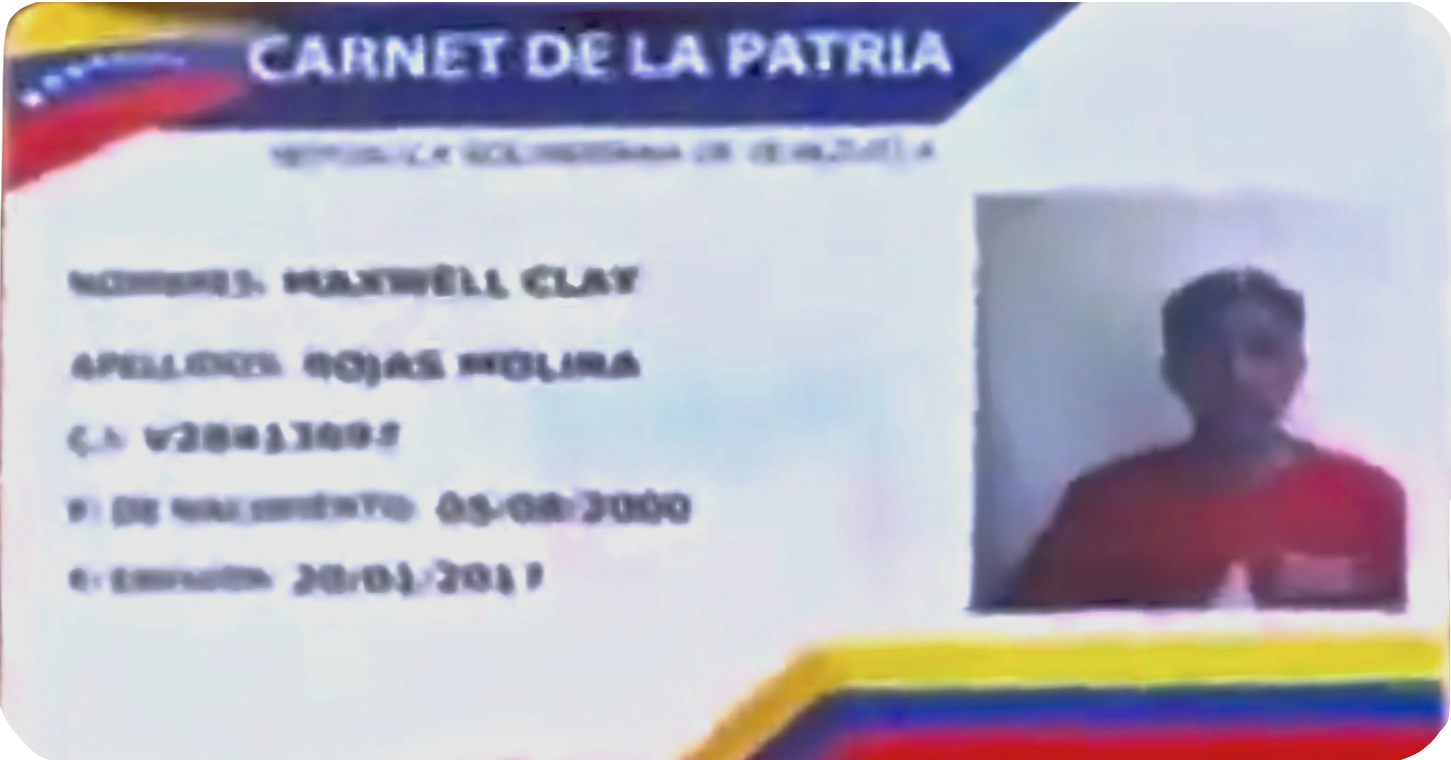
Venezuelans required government issued Carnet de la Patria (Homeland Card) cards to receive CLAP food.

While Venezuelans were suffering from shortages of food, the Bolivarian government created the Local Committees of Supply and Production (CLAP) in 2016. The committees, controlled by supporters of President Maduro, were designated to provide subsidized food and goods to poor Venezuelan households directly. According to the Vice President of Venezuela, Aristóbulo Istúriz, CLAPs are a "political instrument to defend the revolution". Allegations arose that only supporters of Maduro and the government were provided food while critics were denied access to goods. PROVEA, a Venezuelan human rights group, described CLAPs as "a form of food discrimination that is exacerbating social unrest".

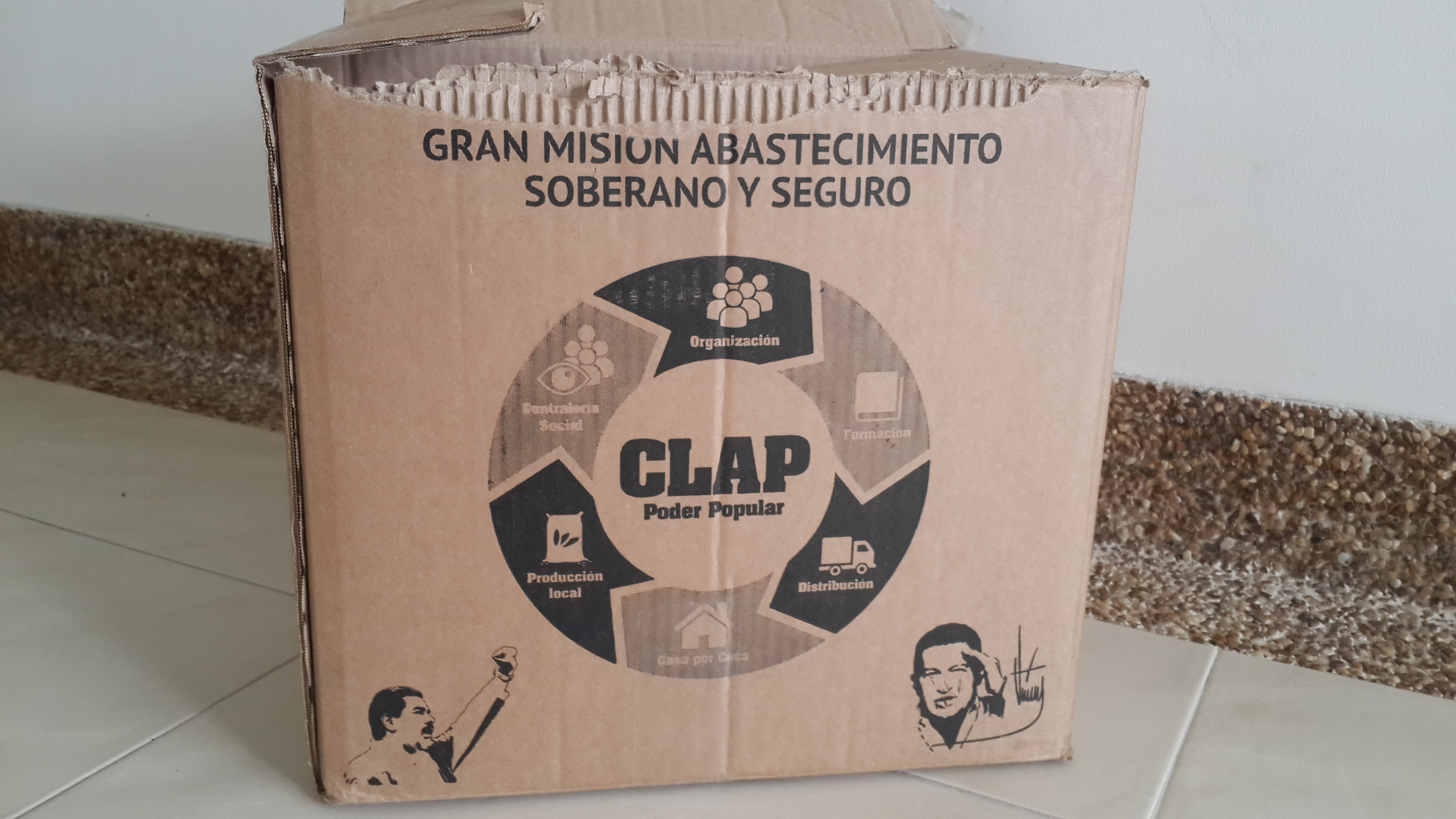
A food box provided by CLAP, with the supplier receiving government funds owned by President Nicolas Maduro

Luisa Ortega Díaz, Chief Prosecutor of Venezuela from 2007 to 2017, revealed that President Maduro had been profiting from the food crisis. CLAP made contracts with Group Grand Limited, a group owned by Maduro through frontmen Rodolfo Reyes, Álvaro Uguedo Vargas and Alex Saab. Group Grand Limited, a Mexican entity owned by Maduro, would sell foodstuffs to CLAP and receive government funds.

On 19 April 2018 after a multilateral meeting between over a dozen European and Latin American countries, United States Department of the Treasury officials stated that they had collaborated with Colombian officials to investigate corrupt import programs of the Maduro administration including CLAP, explaining that Venezuelan officials pocketed 70% of the proceeds allocated for importation programs destined to alleviate hunger in Venezuela. Nations said that they sought to seize the corrupt proceeds that were being funneled into the accounts of Venezuelan officials and hold them for a possible future government in Venezuela. A month later on 17 May 2018, the Colombian government seized 25,200 CLAP boxes containing about 400 tons of decomposing food, which was destined to be distributed to the Venezuelan public. The Colombian government stated that they were investigating shell companies and money laundering related to CLAP operations, saying that the shipment was to be used to buy votes during the 2018 Venezuelan presidential election.

==== Police opinion ====
During the beginning of 2019 shipping of humanitarian aid to Venezuela, the government reportedly prepared a campaign to force police and military officers to sign an open letter to refuse military intervention in Venezuela on 10 January. A group of police officers of the Mariño municipality of the Nueva Esparta state who refused to sign the document were arrested. Hundreds of employees of the public television channel TVes were reportedly fired for refusing to sign the letter. On 17 February, two National Guardsmen were detained for refusing to sign the book "Hands Off Venezuela" and expressing their agreement with the entrance of humanitarian aid.

==== Nepotism ====
Under presidents Chavez and Maduro, nepotism increased within the Venezuelan government.

President Nicolás Maduro and his wife Cilia Flores have been accused of nepotism, with individuals claiming that several of her close relatives became employees of the National Assembly when she became elected deputy. According to the Venezuelan newspaper Tal Cual, 16 relatives of Flores were in an office while she was in the National Assembly. In 2012, relatives of Flores were removed from office. However, relatives who were removed from office found other occupations in the government a year later. President Maduro's son, Nicolás Maduro Guerra, and other relatives have also been used as examples of alleged nepotism.

According to The Atlantic, Diosdado Cabello lavishly rewards friends and even helps fill government offices with members of his own family. His wife is a member of the National Assembly, his brother is in charge of the nation's taxation authority, and his sister is a Venezuelan delegate to the United Nations.

== Governmental branches ==
=== Legislative system ===
In the 2013 corruption report by Transparency International, 66% of Venezuelan respondents believed that the legislative system was corrupt in Venezuela. According to a 2014 report by the Latin American Network for Legislative Transparency, Venezuela's legislative branch, the National Assembly, was rated 21% transparent, the least transparent in Latin America.

=== Judicial system ===
Venezuela's judicial system has been deemed the most corrupt in the world by Transparency International. Human Rights Watch accuse Hugo Chávez and his allies of taking over the Supreme Court in 2004, filling it with supporters and making new measures allowing the government to dismiss justices from the court. In 2010, legislators from Chávez's political party appointed 9 permanent judges and 32 stand-ins, which included several allies. HRW fears that judges may face reprisals if they rule against government interests.

In December 2014, moderate left newspaper El Espectador stated in an article about the accusations against María Corina Machado saying that prosecutions in Venezuela go by a "familiar script", stating that "[t]he executive branch first publicly launches accusations at an opposition politician, state prosecutors then set about compiling formal charges, and the entire process is ultimately confirmed by the Supreme Court".

==== Public opinion ====
In a 2014 Gallup poll, 61% of Venezuelans lack confidence in the judicial system. According to the World Justice Project's Rule of Law Index 2015, Venezuela's justice system was ranked third to last in the world while its criminal justice system was ranked worst in the world according to surveys. The Rule of Law Index 2015 also showed that 79% of Venezuelans believed there was corruption in the judicial system, with 95% believing there was improper influence by the Bolivarian government with civil justice and 100% believing that there was improper influence in criminal justice.

== Authorities ==
=== Police ===
Venezuela's corruption includes widespread corruption in the police force. Criminologists and experts have stated that low wages and lack of police supervision have been attributed to police corruption. Many victims are afraid to report crimes to the police because many officers are involved with criminals and may bring even more harm to the victims. Human Rights Watch has reported that the "police commit one of every five crimes" and that thousands of people have been killed by police officers acting with impunity; only 3% of officers have been charged in cases against them. The Metropolitan Police force in Caracas was so corrupt that it was disbanded and was even accused of assisting in many of the 17,000 kidnappings.

== See also ==
- Crime in Venezuela
- International Anti-Corruption Academy
- Group of States Against Corruption
- International Anti-Corruption Day
- ISO 37001 Anti-bribery management systems
- United Nations Convention against Corruption
- OECD Anti-Bribery Convention
- Transparency International
