= National Center for Foreign Commerce =

National Center for Foreign Commerce (CENCOEX)
- Centro Nacional de Comercio Exterior

Agency overview
- Formed: 2015
- Preceding agencies: Régimen de Cambio Diferencial (RECADI) (1983–2003); Comisión de Administración de Divisas (CADIVI) (2003–2015)
- Jurisdiction: Government of Venezuela
- Headquarters: Caracas
- Annual budget: US$50 billion (2009); US$30 billion (2010)
- Parent agency: Ministerio del Poder Popular de Planificación y Finanzas
- Website: www.cencoex.gob.ve

The National Center for Foreign Commerce (Spanish: Centro Nacional de Comercio Exterior, CENCOEX), formerly the Commission for the Administration of Currency Exchange (Comisión de Administración de Divisas CADIVI), is the Venezuelan government body which administers legal currency exchange in Venezuela. The official buy/sell exchange rate was initially fixed at Bs.F. 4.28/Bs.F. 4.30 per US dollar (USD).

== History ==
Timeline of Foreign Exchange Regimes
Period	System	Classification
1964–1983	Fixed exchange rate	Free capital mobility
1983–1989	RECADI	Exchange Control
1989–1992	Floating exchange rate	Free capital mobility
1992–1994	Microdevaluations	Free capital mobility
1994–1996	OTAC	Exchange Control
1996–2002	Exchange Bands	Exchange Control
2002–2003	Floating exchange rate	Floating controlled
2003–present	CADIVI and others	Exchange Control

In 1983, a similar agency called "Differential Change Regime" (Régimen de Cambio Diferencial(RECADI)) was established to manage a system of differential exchange rates and capital controls, and disbanded in 1989 when the differential exchange rate system was abolished. RECADI saw widespread corruption, and became a substantial scandal in 1989 when five former ministers were arrested, although the charges were later dropped.

Exchange controls under CADIVI were adopted on 5 February 2003 in an attempt to limit capital flight.

In 2008, the Chávez government revalued the Venezuela currency by a ratio of 1:1000, thus creating a new currency known as the bolívar fuerte (Eng.: "bolivar") but kept the currency pegged to a higher rate against the dollar than the market value. Since 2003, this has created a scarcity of foreign currency, as confidence in the bolivar declined, and foreign exchange, especially the U.S. dollar, was in greater demand.

== Functions ==
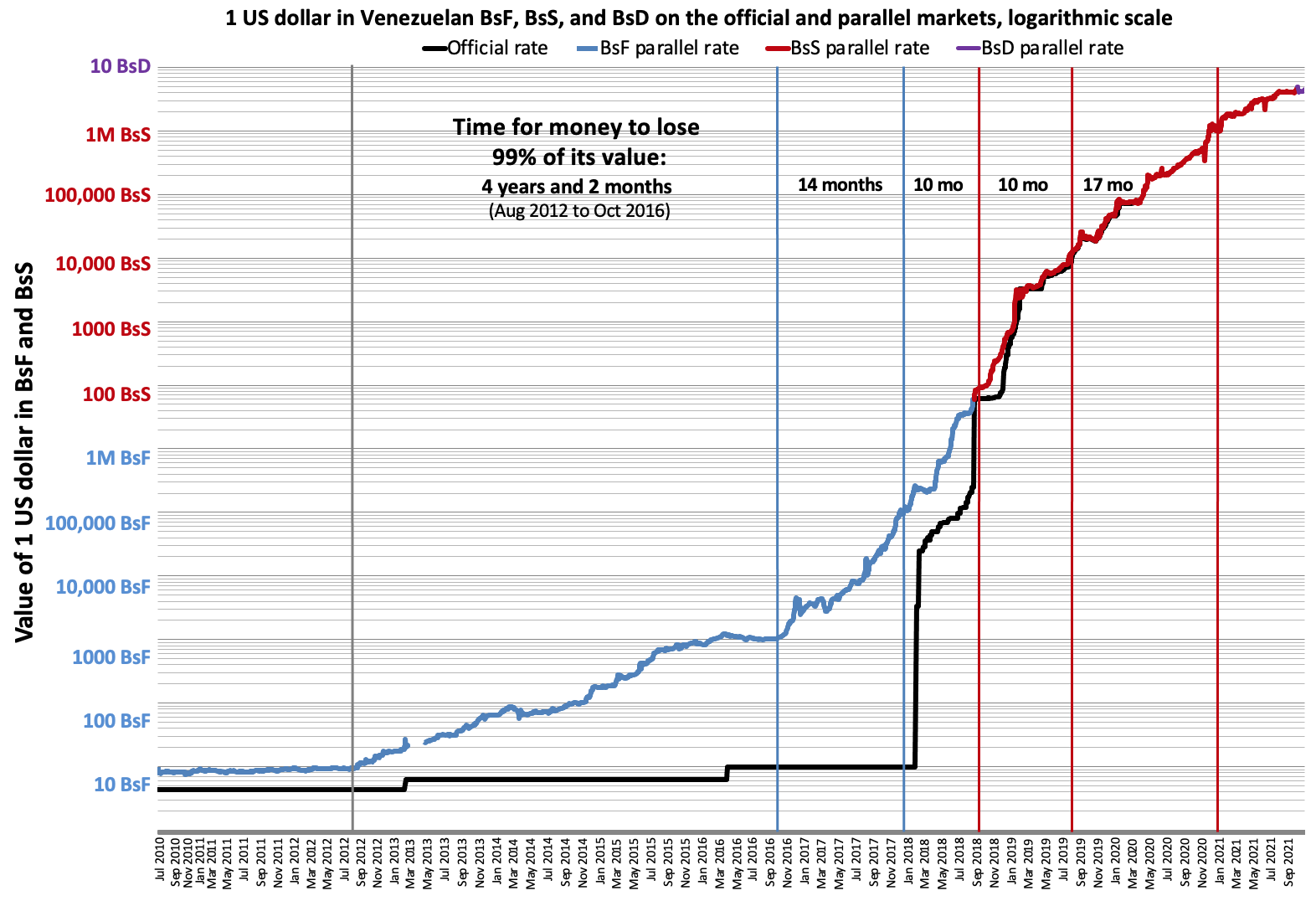
The value of one US dollar in Venezuelan bolívares (VEF) on the black market through time, according to DolarToday.com. Blue vertical lines represent every time the currency has lost 90% of its value relative to the US dollar since the last one. This has happened four times since 2012, meaning that the currency is worth, as of December 2017, less than one ten-thousandth of what it was worth five years ago, since it has lost 99.99% of its value. The rate at which the value is lost (inflation) is rapidly accelerating. The first time the money took 2 years and 2 months (an implied monthly inflation rate of 9.3%) to lose 90% of its value, the second time 1 year and 10 months (implied rate 11% m/m), the third time only 10 months (implied rate 26% m/m), and the fourth time a mere four months (implied rate 77% m/m).

According to the Bank for International Settlements, "The Central Bank of Venezuela (BCV) fixed a monthly allocation of foreign currency to be administered by CADIVI, purchases foreign currency from residents, and sells foreign currency to the public and private sectors subject to approval from CADIVI." Under Venezuelan law PDVSA must sell its foreign exchange to the Central Bank, thereby providing the bulk of foreign currency in Venezuela. The Venezuelan private sector requires more foreign exchange for imports than it generates for exports, and is dependent on the Bank to satisfy the difference.

A 2022 study in International Organization using firm-level data on CADIVI dollar allocations from 2003 to 2013 found that the Chávez government sold more than $200 billion in subsidized dollars, roughly 80 percent of them to importers, finding that the exchange-rate subsidy benefited importer lobbies at the expense of consumers.

=== Exchange rates ===
The agency makes hard currency available to importers at several rates, with the best rate, CENCOEX, the official exchange rate 1 U.S. dollar for 6.3 bolivars, available to importers of food and medicine. A double rate, Complementary System of Foreign Exchange Administration (Sistema complementario de administracion de divisas (SICAD I)), twice the official exchange rate but still favorable, goes to importers of culturally important items such as Scotch, popular in Venezuela, and Barbie dolls, again, popular with certain demographics. A third rate, Alternative Foreign Exchange System (Sistema cambiario alternativo de divisas (SICAD II)), quite unfavorable at 50 times the official exchange rate, is offered to other importers. The black market rate, as of late December 2014, was 173 to 1 and rising rapidly. Publication of unofficial exchange rates within Venezuela is a crime; rates are published on external sites.

== Fraud ==
Fraud is widespread, with importers, regulators, and ordinary citizens stealing billions from the Venezuelan economy using one mechanism or another. Importers, for example, may simply sell the hard currency on the black market and not import anything, only part of what they declared, or at grossly exaggerated prices. A regulator may charge extra for exchange.

== See also ==
- RECADI
- Corruption in Venezuela
- Foreign exchange controls
