= RECADI affair =

The RECADI affair was a political scandal involving the RECADI office of Venezuela and the presidency of Jaime Lusinchi. This office was founded during the presidency of Luis Herrera Campins, and later dissolved during the second presidency of Carlos Andrés Pérez and accused of being part of the largest corruption scandal in the country in the history up to that moment. The chinese businessman Ho Fuk Wing was the only one convicted.

== Background ==
After devaluation of the bolivar in 1983, the presidency of Jaime Lusinchi created the Office of the Differential Exchange Regime (RECADI), to distribute preferential dollars for imports, a third cheaper than in the free market.

== History ==
Members of the congressional investigative commission, among whom was MAS deputy Carlos Tablante, denounced the corruption scheme. The judge in charge was Luis Larriva López and in 1989 he issued an arrest warrant against Richard Ames François Gauthier, president in Venezuela of the verification company Societé Général Surveillance (swiss), André Marcel Le Dem, president of Bureau Veritas (french) and Libio Pernetz Janovitz, president of Caleb Brett of Venezuela, SA (american), who was arrested while trying to escape in his private plane, in addition to two chinese citizens, among them, Ho Fuk Wing, accused of founding 19 fake import companies between 1984 and 1986.

== See also ==
- RECADI
- Ho Fuk Wing
