= Sierra Nevada affair =

Venezuelan corruption scandal

The Sierra Nevada affair was a corruption scandal in Venezuela that revolved around the purchase of the Sierra Nevada ship during the first government of Carlos Andrés Pérez.

== Background ==
On 1 November 1979, an investigation began before a parliamentary commission presided over by the deputy of the Democratic Republican Union (URD) Ramón Tenorio Sifontes, along with deputies Anselmo Natale, Leonardo Ferrer, Pedro Tabata Guzmán and Miguel Bellorin Tineo. Previously, the Ethics Commission of the Democratic Action party had already sanctioned Carlos Andres Perez and two other officials administratively. The affair was important because it would determine the political future of Carlos Andrés and presented a real possibility that administrative corruption to be sanctioned, an issue overwhelmingly discussed by the public agenda.

== Complaints ==
The accusation was made by Leopoldo Díaz Bruzual, minister in the government of Luis Herrera Campins, which implicated a former Minister of Development of Pérez and the former president of the Corporación Venezolana de Fomento. The accusation revolved around the overpricing in the purchase of the Sierra Nevada ship, and it was intended to charge Carlos Andrés Pérez in this way.

== Congress trial ==
On 9 January 1980, the People's Electoral Movement (MEP) requested an investigation of the president's assets. A congressional commission, in turn, requested his impeachment for the moral, political and administrative responsibility he bore in the scandal. The debate ended up being decided in the National Congress in a vote on 8 May. The chambers determined that Carlos Andres had political responsibility, but not administrative or moral responsibility. Several independent deputies of Democratic Action, some votes of Movement to Socialism (MAS) and José Vicente Rangel obtained more votes than the deputies of Copei and MAS, and absolved Carlos Andrés Pérez from being administratively condemned by the Congress.

One of the possible reasons why many of the votes in favor of Pérez occurred was because the deputies did not want to support the efforts of Rafael Caldera or Rómulo Betancourt, who had distanced himself from Pérez over the issue of administrative corruption, to weaken Carlos Andrés politically. The result was the report known as the Tenorio Report.

=== Voting results ===
Congress in its joint session of both chambers on 8 May 1980 gave as a result of the vote:

- Political responsibility: 132 votes against the president and 102 in favor (responsible)
- Administrative responsibility: 113 votes against the president and 115 votes in favor (acquitted)
- Moral responsibility: 111 votes against the president and 119 votes in favor (acquitted).

The Sierra Nevada affair was closed by the Prosecutor's Office on 13 June 1980.

== See also ==
- Twelve Apostles (Venezuela)
- Corruption in Venezuela
