= Leamsy Salazar =

Venezuelan defector (born 1974)

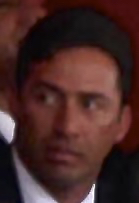
- Salazar in March 2014
- Born: 24 May 1974 (age 52); Caracas, Venezuela
- Military career
- Allegiance: Venezuela
- Branch: Venezuelan Navy
- Service years: 1998–2014
- Rank: Lieutenant Colonel

Leamsy José Salazar Villafaña (Caracas, 24 May 1974) is an ex-lieutenant colonel in the Venezuelan Navy who was also the head of security details for Hugo Chávez and Diosdado Cabello. Salazar defected to the United States in December 2014 with the assistance of the United States Drug Enforcement Administration providing allegations of Diosdado Cabello heading an organization involved in international drug trade known as the Cartel of the Suns.

== Early life and education ==
Salazar attended the Venezuelan Naval Academy (now Bolivarian Naval Academy) and graduated in 1998. He then specialized in the marines and was stationed in Punto Fijo.

== Career ==
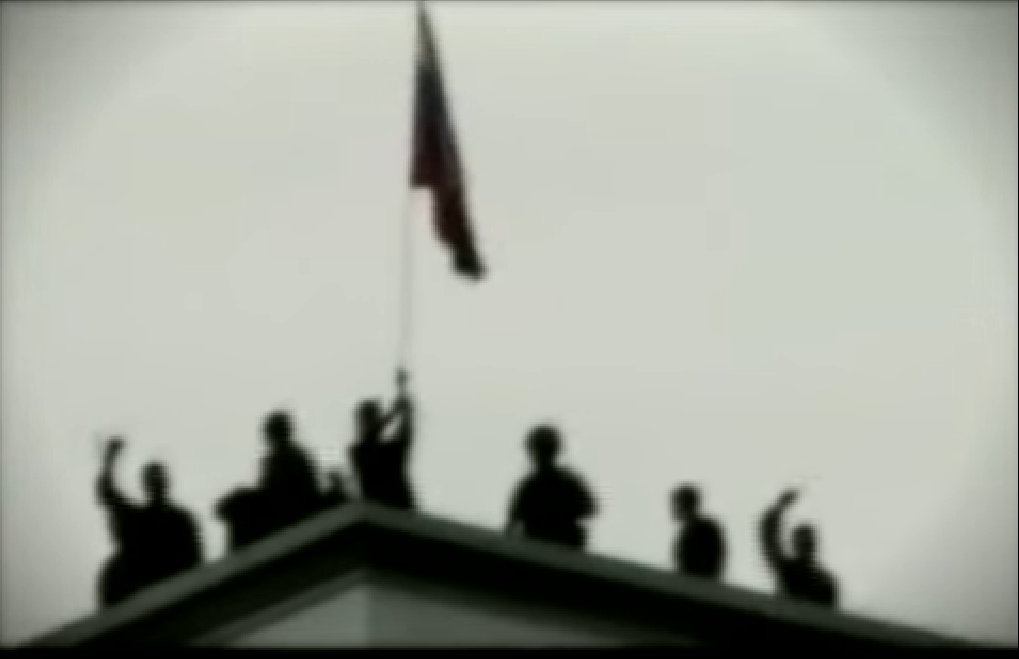
Salazar, waving the Venezuelan flag following the 2002 Venezuelan coup d'état attempt

On April 12 in the afternoon was Lieutenant Salazar Villafaña, the one with the flag. Salazar was a great and humble marine ...

— Hugo Chávez

=== Presidential security ===
When Hugo Chávez took office in early 1999, Salazar was among the most prestigious, young officers chosen to serve as one Chávez's honor guards. Salazar then not only provided security for Chávez, but was also his personal assistant. Following the 2002 Venezuelan coup d'état attempt, Chávez recognized Salazar as one of his defenders.

External videos
- President Hugo Chávez commemorating Salazar's actions. on YouTube

Following his experiences during the coup attempt in 2002, Salazar then decided to join Venezuela's special forces. After a helicopter demonstration performed by Salazar at the Parade of the Navy in 2006, Chávez once again recognized Salazar and asked Jesse Chacón, then Minister of Interior and Justice, to place Salazar on his security details for a second time at Miraflores Palace. Salazar was then reassigned and provided security for Chávez until 2013, when Chávez died of cancer.

After Chávez's death, Salazar became the head of the security detail for then President of the National Assembly of Venezuela, Diosdado Cabello until 2014.

=== Defection to the United States ===
==== Assistance of the DEA ====
In December 2014, Salazar defected to the United States after communicating with the United States Drug Enforcement Administration for about two months about Diosdado Cabello's alleged involvement with international drug trade. Salazar was then placed in witness protection, fleeing to the United States with assistance of the Drug Enforcement Administration's Special Operations Division after cooperation with the administration and providing possible details on Cabello's involvement with international drug trade. Salazar claims that Cabello is the leader of the Cartel of the Suns, an alleged military drug trafficking organization in Venezuela. Salazar stated that he saw Cabello give orders on transporting tons of cocaine. The shipments of drugs were reportedly sent from FARC in Colombia and shipped to the United States and Europe, with the possible assistance of Cuba. The alleged international drug operation had possibly involved senior members of Venezuela's government as well, such as Tarek El Aissami and José David Cabello, Diosdado's brother.

==== Death of Hugo Chávez ====
After Salazar defected to the United States, he also said that the date that Hugo Chávez was to have allegedly died according to the Venezuelan government was wrong. With information from Salazar, ambassador to the Organization of American States, Guillermo Cochez, stated that Salazar said that Hugo Chávez died at 19:32 on 30 December 2012, contrasting the date Nicolás Maduro stated, which was 5 March 2013. This would be controversial since laws were passed in Chávez's name after the date Salazar stated he was to have died.
