= Ghazi Nasr Al-Din =

Venezuelan diplomat

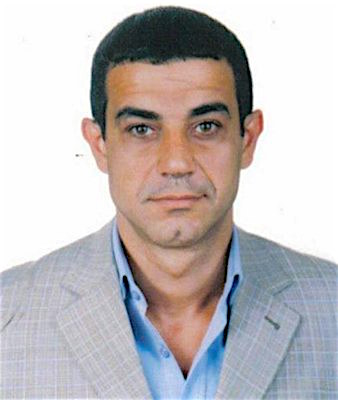
- FBI image of Nasr Al-Din.

Charge d'affaires of the Venezuelan Embassy in Damascus, Syria
- In office 2005–2008
- President: Hugo Chávez

Personal details
- Born: 13 December 1962 (age 63) or 1 October 1971 (age 55) Beirut, Lebanon
- Height: 5 ft 7 in (170 cm)

Ghazi Nasr Al-Din is a Lebanese Venezuelan who served as charge d'affaires of the Venezuelan Embassy in Damascus, Syria and is accused of assisting Hezbollah.

== Early life ==
Ghazi Nasr Al-Din was born on either 13 December 1962 or 1 October 1971 in Beirut, Lebanon.

== Career ==
In 2000, shortly after Hugo Chávez came to power, Nasr Al-Din immigrated into Venezuela. Nasr Al-Din eventually established a relationship with aspiring Venezuelan politician Tareck El Aissami. He was then made the Charge d' Affaires of the Venezuelan Embassy in Damascus, Syria. In 2008, he was appointed as Director of Political Aspects at the Venezuelan Embassy in Lebanon.

== Controversy ==
=== Hezbollah allegations ===
While serving as a Venezuelan diplomat in Venezuela and making connections through a local Islamic group in Venezuela, Nasr Al-Din allegedly established ties to various entities in the Middle East, including the terrorist organization Hezbollah. The Government of the United States has accused Nasr Al-Din of having "counseled Hizballah donors on fundraising efforts and has provided donors with specific information on bank accounts where the donors' deposits would go directly to Hizballah" and had "met with senior Hizballah officials in Lebanon to discuss operational issues, as well as facilitated the travel of Hizballah members to and from Venezuela". Allegations also involved an event in January 2006, where "Nasr al Din facilitated the travel of two Hizballah representatives to the Lebanese Parliament to Caracas to solicit donations for Hizballah and to announce the opening of a Hizballah-sponsored community center and office in Venezuela", later assisting the travel of more Hezbollah members to Iran. Nasr Al-Din had also met with Walid Makled, a Venezuelan drug trafficker, doing "business" with him.

Following the 2006 appointment of Nicolás Maduro, Venezuela's future president, to be Venezuela's Minister of Foreign Affairs, Nasr Al-Din's diplomatic workload increased as he delivered multiple Venezuelan visas to Lebanese citizens in 2007. In 2008, the United States Department of the Treasury placed Nasr Al-Din on its terrorism blacklist citing his assistance of Hezbollah.

A 22 August 2010 meeting in Caracas was also planned by Nasr Al-Din, which involved Venezuelan president Hugo Chávez, Hamas Supreme Leader Khaled Mashal, a Hezbollah leader and Secretary-General of the Islamic Jihad Movement in Palestine Ramadan Abdullah Mohammad Shallah. In 2015, the FBI listed him as a person of interest due to his connections to Hezbollah.

==== Family involvement ====
Nasr Al-Din brothers, Abdallah and Oday, both reside in Isla Margarita, Venezuela. Abdallah Nasr Al-Din allegedly launders money for Hezbollah on the island while Oday recruits chavistas to join Bolivarian Circles and travel to Iran for training.

== See also ==
- Corruption in Venezuela
