= RECADI =

Venezuelan currency exchange control office from 1983 to 1989

Régimen de Cambio Diferencial (RECADI)
Agency overview
- Formed: 28 February 1983
- Dissolved: 10 February 1989
- Jurisdiction: Nationwide

The Office of Differential Exchange Regime (RECADI) was an currency exchange control system in Venezuela implemented during the government of Luis Herrera Campíns that operated between 28 February 1983 (ten days after Viernes Negro) and 10 February 1989 to regulate the delivery of foreign currency. It was established to administer a system of differential exchange rates and capital controls.

== History ==
On 15 June 1987, in compliance with Presidential Decree No. 1,544, RECADI ceased its functions; foreign currency purchase and sale operations, still restricted by the government, became directly administered by the Ministry of Finance. The system was dissolved in 1989, when the differential exchange rate system was abolished. On 24 February, an investigation was opened by presidential order against RECADI for alleged financial fraud. RECADI constituted a break in the highlight of Venezuelan corruption, and became a major scandal in 1989 when five former ministers were arrested. However, the charges were later dropped.

Since Black Friday, it represents a milestone that changed its economic history. Until that day, the stability and reliability that had characterized the bolivar since the second decade of the XX century, whose last free exchange rate against the dollar was at a fixed value of 4.30 bolivars, was officially maintained. Since then, the constant devaluation of the bolivar, complications with the payment of the foreign debt, the accelerated deterioration of the purchasing power and the implementation of RECADI made the stability of the Venezuelan currency disappear.

== See also ==
- Ho Fuk Wing
- National Center for Foreign Commerce
- Corruption in Venezuela
