= Ho Fuk Wing =

Chinese businessman arrested in Venezuela

- Citizenship: Venezuelan
- Occupation: Businessman

Ho Fuk Wing, known colloquially as the el chinito de RECADI (lit. 'the RECADI little Chinese'), is a Chinese businessman and naturalized Venezuelan citizen who was convicted for "fraudulent exploitation" of the Differential Exchange Regime (RECADI) exchange control system.

== Detention ==
On 28 April 1989, judge Luis Guillermo La Riva López issued an arrest warrant against the Chinese businessmen and naturalized Venezuelan citizens, Ho Fuk Wing and Ho Fuk Shum. Both Wing and Shum were charged with the crime of "fraudulent use" of state money after authorities discovered Wing had founded nineteen fake import companies between 1984 and 1986 and obtained dollars at preferential rates from the government. The arrest warrants were part of those issued against five businessmen for false imports into Venezuela as part of the Differential Exchange Regime (RECADI). Ho Fuk Wing was imprisoned for three years before being sentenced and detained for an additional four months.

== Legacy ==
Ho Fuk Wing is often cited as the only person convicted of corruption related to the RECADI exchange control, so the Venezuelan slang has adopted the expression "chinito de RECADI" (lit. 'RECADI little Chinese') to refer to a scapegoat.

== See also ==
- Corruption in Venezuela
