= Dictatorship of Simón Bolívar in the Second Republic of Venezuela =

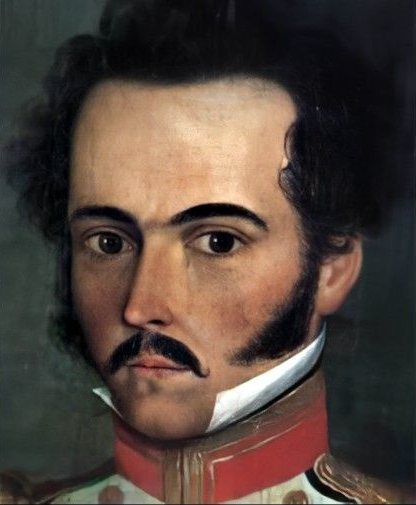
Simón Bolívar, 1812

The dictatorship of Simón Bolívar in Venezuela was the government established in the context of the War of Independence, between 1813 and 1814, after proclaiming the restoration of the Republic in what is now called the Second Republic of Venezuela, being the only government of this period and lasting until its fall. Bolívar was named dictator in a Popular Assembly in Caracas to lead the country for the duration of the war, publicly assuring that his intention was not to perpetuate himself in power.

The nation had two centers of power: Caracas, governed by Bolívar, and Cumaná, governed by Santiago Mariño. During this time, the emigration to the East from Caracas took place; Bolívar and Mariño were defeated by José Tomás Boves and left the country into exile in 1814.

== Cabinet ==
Bolívar appointed three secretaries of State: Antonio Muñoz Tébar in Finance and Foreign Affairs, Tomás Montilla as Minister of War, and Rafael Diego Mérida as Minister of Interior. Subsequently, a special position was created for the control of public revenues, granted to General José Félix Ribas.

== Domestic policy ==
=== Provisional Government Plan ===
On August 13, 1813, Bolívar commissioned the jurist Francisco Javier Ustáriz to draft the Provisional Government Plan for Venezuela, with the intention of reorganizing power to avoid the problems that led to the fall of the First Republic. Although it remained unfinished, notable points included:

- The supreme Legislative Power shall reside in the General in Chief of the Liberating Army, without other restrictions than those emanating from the General Congress of New Granada, his constituent, until peace.
- The Executive Power shall likewise reside in him, under the same restrictions, particularly in all matters concerning the armed forces of sea and land.
- In all governmental, economic, and police matters, they shall be under the charge of their respective magistrates, under the dependency of the same General in Chief. (...)
- The military government of the province of Caracas shall reside in the General in Chief when he is in the capital, and when he leaves for expeditions, it shall fall upon the person he appoints, or upon the highest-ranking American officer employed in the same capital at his departure.

=== Official appointment of Bolívar ===
On January 2, 1814, a Popular Assembly was held at the Convent of San Francisco in Caracas, attended by the civil governor, the director general of Revenues, representatives of the university, among others. Bolívar declared in the Assembly:

I beg you not to believe that my moderation is to delude you and to reach tyranny by this means. My protests, I swear, are the most sincere. I am not like Sulla, who covered his homeland in mourning and blood; but I wish to imitate the Dictator of Rome, in the detachment with which, abdicating the Supreme Power, he returned to private life and submitted himself in all things to the rule of law.

Bolívar accepted the mandate after attempting to decline, saying: "Choose your representatives, your magistrates, a just government," and finally accepting, making it clear that he did so by popular will, and disassociating himself from the authority of the Congress of New Granada.

Regarding his government, Bolívar declared to the Congress of New Granada on August 8, 1813:

"In the meantime that a legal and permanent government is organized, I find myself exercising the supreme authority, which I shall lay down in the hands of an assembly of notables of this capital, which must be convened to demand a government conforming to the nature of the circumstances, and to the instructions I have received from that august congress."

== Foreign policy ==
=== War to the Death ===
Regarding the War to the Death, Secretary of State Antonio Muñoz Tébar declared by order of Bolívar in 1814:

The forces that were distracted in the custody of these [prisoners] have been able to safely take the field to defeat the enemy. For a long time, generosity spoke in vain for them; for a long time, the Government turned a deaf ear to the voice of the people; it was even preparing to deport them to make them enjoy liberty in other regions. A continuous series of outrages had been overlooked on our part; offers of exchange were made to save them. We have had to repent of so much indulgence; those who owed us their lives have turned against ours. New crimes, new perfidies have produced, in the days of liberty, around and among us, evils greater than the previous ones. The Spanish prisoners have been executed by firing squad, when their impunity emboldened the rancor of their comrades; when their conspiracies, in the very heart of the dungeons, barely thwarted, when resurrected, imposed on us the harsh measure to which the right to reprisals had long authorized us.

== See also ==
- Presidency of Simón Bolívar in the Third Republic of Venezuela
- Dictatorship of Simón Bolívar in Gran Colombia
