= Guillermo Cochez =

Panamanian politician and lawyer

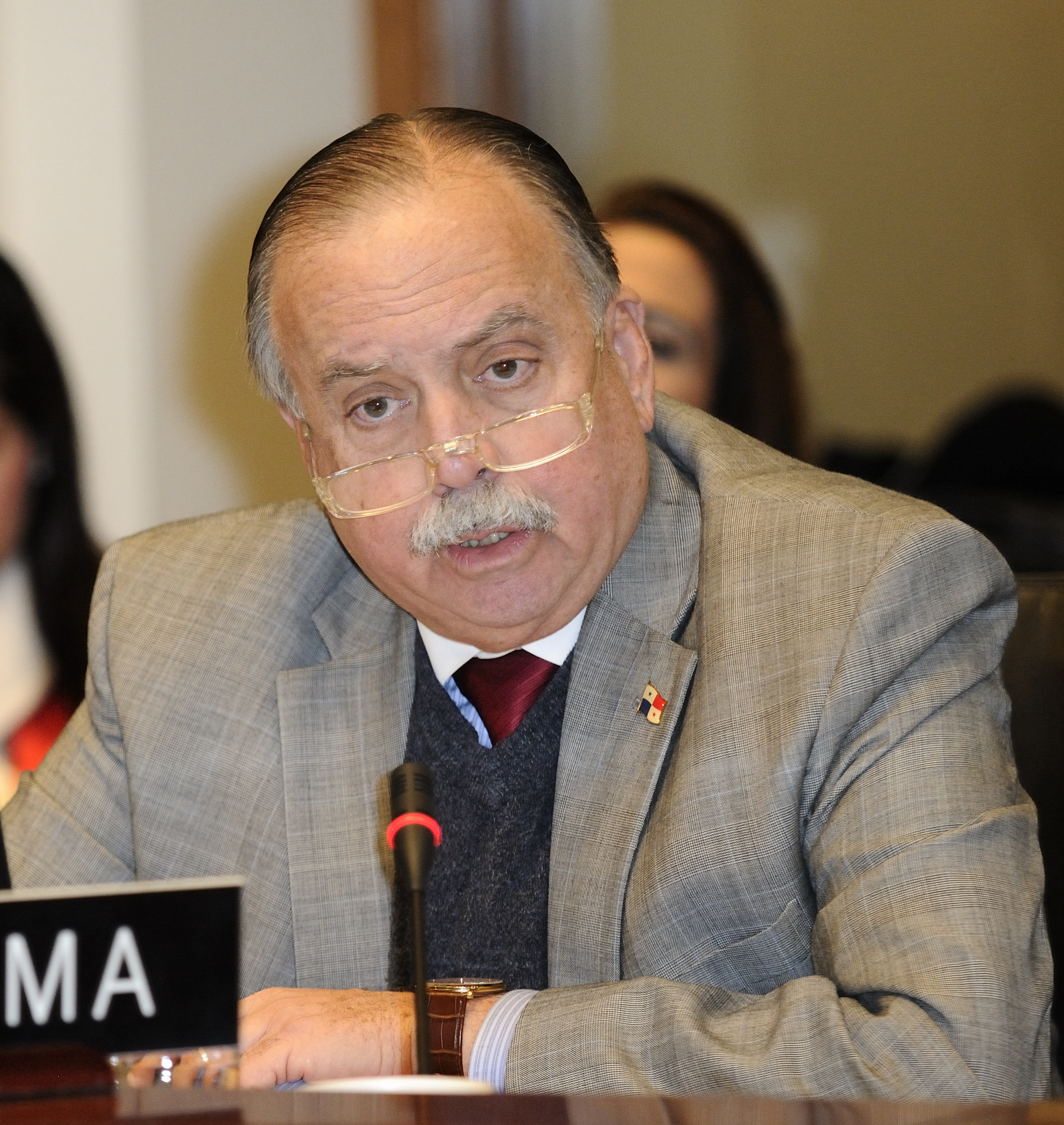

Deputy of the National Assembly of Panama
- In office 1984–1989
- In office 1990–1994

Mayor of Panama City
- In office December 1989 – April 1991

Personal details
- Born: Guillermo Alberto Cochez Farrugia; September 21, 1945 (age 80) Panama City, Panama
- Education: University of Panama, Tulane University
- Occupation: Lawyer and journalist

Guillermo Alberto Cochez Farrugia is a Panamanian politician and lawyer who served as the former representative of Panama to the Organization of American States (OAS) between 2009 and 2013.

== Education ==
Cochez attended a primary and high school run by the La Salle Christian Brothers. For his college studies, he attended the University of Panama for his law degree and later attended Tulane University where he received a Masters of Civil Law.

== Career ==
=== Law ===
When Cochez returned to Panama, he established his own law practice and began to teach at the University of Panama's law school. Following his involvement in government office, Cochez returned to practicing law and focused on Panamanian banking and financial laws.

=== Mayor of Panama City ===
Following the fall of the Manuel Noriega dictatorship in 1989, Cochez was chosen as Mayor of Panama City where he served until 1991.

=== Organization of American States (OAS) ===
He was removed from his position after an outburst during a January 17, 2013 OAS session, in which he referred to Venezuela as a “classic dictatorship” and a “sick democracy”. He claimed Venezuelan president Hugo Chavez was dead, citing his delayed inauguration as a way for the government to buy themselves time for a re-election.

Human rights groups, such as the Human Rights Foundation have expressed support for Cochez, calling him "a loss for the OAS" and referring to him as "the only Latin American diplomat who dared to challenge the legitimacy of the Cuban government".

After being removed from his position with the OAS, Cochez continues to speak out on immigration issues affecting the Americas. In 2017, in regards to the end of the "wet-foot dry-foot" immigration policy that allowed Cuban immigrants to stay in the US, if they reached the mainland, Cochez noted that the end of the policy would, "be an additional burden for the Panamanian government and for all Central American governments that have "Cubans in transit to the United States."

== Awards and recognition ==
- 2013 – The Francisco de Miranda Award from the Interamerican Institute for Democracy.
