= Miriam Morandy =

Venezuelan lawyer and judge

- Miriam del Valle Morandy Mijares

Judge of the Criminal Appeals Court of the Supreme Tribunal of Justice
- In office 2006–2010
- Preceded by: Alejandro Angúlo Fontiveros
- Succeeded by: Ninoska Queipo B.

Personal details
- Born: October 27, 1961 (age 64) Maturín, Venezuela
- Education: Universidad Santa María; Instituto Universitario de Policía Científica

Miriam del Valle Morandy Mijares is a Venezuelan lawyer and former Judge of the Criminal Appeals Court of the Supreme Tribunal of Justice between 2006 and 2010. Morandy has been known to have a close relationship with the First Lady of Venezuela, Cilia Flores, being described as the "comadre of Cilia".

== Early life and education ==
Morandy was born in Maturín, Venezuela. She attended Universidad Santa María in Caracas between 1983 and 1988, earning her law degree. From 1993 to 2000, Morandy studied criminology at the Instituto Universitario de Policía Científica and earned her master's degree on the subject.

== Career ==
=== Politics ===
Her professional career began with the Technical Judicial Police in 1981, working on penal code issues. Throughout the 1990s, Morandy acted as a professor for DISIP, the Public Ministry of Venezuela, the Venezuelan National Guard and the Caracas Metropolitan Police. Into the 2000s she participated in multiple courses for CICPC, local organizations and for the First Central American and Caribbean Congress on Social Security, teaching military and civilian personnel in Honduras. Morandy also ruled over the cases of Ivan Simonovis, Lazaro Forero and Henry Vivas of the Caracas Metropolitan Police for their actions during the 2002 Venezuelan coup d'état attempt. In 2004, Morandy was named a judge of the Supreme Tribunal of Justice by the National Assembly and became Criminal Division in 2005.

=== Business ===
In September 2007 while serving as a judge in the Supreme Tribunal of Justice, Morandy became a holder of 35% of the Comercializadora Jomira company. The company's was involved in various works that included marketing, office equipment, clothing and food distribution. Comercializadora Jomira was reported to have been worth 150 million bolívares.

== Arrest ==
On 23 May 2015, Morandy was seen arriving at Maiquetia International Airport with alleged drug kingpin Richard José Cammarano Jaime and her assistant Tibisay Pacheco to board a TAP-Air Portugal flight to Portugal. While leaving their taxi, Morandy, Cammarano and Pacheco were arrested for drug trafficking. She was released shortly after, while Cammarano was still detained.

== Awards and recognition ==
- Brion Municipality Our Lady of Mount Carmel Order, First Class (1999)
- Judicial Police Honor of Merit, First Class (1999)
- Order of Distinction Honor of Merit of the Scientific and Criminal Investigations, Criminal, First Class
- Order of Merit in Work, silver class
