= Presidency of Carlos Andrés Pérez =

Presidency of Carlos Andrés Pérez may refer to:

- First presidency of Carlos Andrés Pérez
- Second presidency of Carlos Andrés Pérez
