= First presidency of Carlos Andrés Pérez =

Venezuelan presidential administration (1974–1979)

- First Presidency of Carlos Andrés Pérez; March 11, 1974 – March 11, 1979
- Cabinet: See list
- Party: Acción Democrática
- Election: 1973
- Seat: Miraflores Palace
- Presidential Standard

The first presidency of Carlos Andrés Pérez or the First Andrés Pérez Presidency or the First Andrés Pérez Administration was Carlos Andrés Pérez's first tenure as the President of Venezuela, which lasted from 11 March 1974 to 11 March 1979. His first presidency coincided with the oil boom of 1974, which saw Venezuela's economy prosper. Carlos Andrés Pérez launched a program of rapid modernization. His first presidency also saw the nationalization of the oil industry. He would later regain the presidency following his victory in the 1988 elections in Venezuela. His second presidency would start on February 2, 1989.

== Background ==
Venezuelan Presidential election 1973
Results

Candidates	Votes	%
Carlos Andrés Pérez	2,122,427	48.70%
Lorenzo Fernández	1,598,929	36.70%
Jesús Paz Galarraga	221,827	5.05%
José Vicente Rangel	186,255	4.26%
Abstention:	164,935	3.48%
Total votes:	4.572.187

In 1973, Carlos Andrés Pérez was nominated to run for the presidency for AD. Youthful and energetic, Perez ran a vibrant and triumphalist campaign, one of the first to use the services of American advertising gurus and political consultants in the country's history. During the run up to elections, he visited nearly all the villages and cities of Venezuela by foot and walked more than 5800 kilometers. He was elected in December of that year, receiving 48.7% of the vote against the 36.7% of his main rival.

Many people were skeptical that Venezuelans would choose such a controversial figure as Pérez, but when the results were in they showed he had won a clear a victory, but, what was even more important, AD had an absolute majority in Congress: the pardo masses were still adecos to the core (1973). Pérez's appeal was not only to the poor but also to the elite and the middle class, for, it was widely reported in political circles and the media, that his political advisor Diego Arria created his public persona as a well-tailored man and in general refurbished his "image".

== Cabinet ==
Ministries
OFFICE	NAME	TERM
President	Carlos Andrés Pérez	1974–1979
Home Affairs	Luis Piñerúa Ordaz	1974–1975
Home Affairs	Octavio Lepage	1975–1978
Home Affairs	Manuel Mantilla	1978–1979
Foreign Relations	Efraín Schacht Aristeguieta	1974–1975
Foreign Relations	Ramón Escovar Salom	1975–1977
Foreign Relations	Simón Alberto Consalvi	1977–1979
Finance	Héctor Hurtado	1974–1977
Finance	Luis José Silva Luongo	1977–1979
Defense	Homero Leal Torres	1974–1976
Defense	Francisco Álvarez Torres	1976–1977
Defense	Fernando Paredes Bello	1977–1979
Development	Carmelo Lauría Lesseur	1974
Development	Constantino Quero Morales	1974–1975
Development	José Ignacio Casal	1975–1976
Development	Luis Álavarez Domínguez	1976–1979
Education	Luis Manuel Peñalver	1974–1977
Education	Carlos Rafael Silva	1977–1979
Education	Gerardo Cedeño Fermín	1979
Justice	Otto Marín Gómez	1974–1975
Justice	Armando Sánchez Bueno	1975–1976
Justice	Juan Martín Echeverría	1976–1979
Mines and Hydrocarbons	Valentín Hernández Acosta	1974–1979
Environment	Arnoldo José Gabaldón	1977–1979
Agriculture	Froilán Álvarez Yépez	1974
Agriculture	Luis José Oropeza	1974–1975
Agriculture	Carmelo Contreras Barboza	1975
Agriculture	Gustavo Pinto Cohén	1975–1979
Labor	Antonio Leidenz	1974–1976
Labor	José Manzo González	1976–1979
Health and Social Assistance	Blas Bruni Celli	1974–1975
Health and Social Assistance	Antonio Parra León	1975–1979
Communications	Armando Sánchez Bueno	1974–1975
Communications	Leopoldo Sucre Figarella	1975–1976
Communications	Jesús Vivas Casanova	1976–1977
Transport and communications	Jesús Vivas Casanova	1977–1979
Transport and communications	José Ignacio Álvarez Maldonado	1979
Urban Development	Robert Padilla Fernández	1977–1979
Information and Tourism	Diego Arria	1977–1978
Information and Tourism	Celestino Armas	1978–1979
Youth	Pedro París Montesinos	1977
Youth	Alfredo Baldó Casanova	1977–1979
Secretary of Presidency	Ramón Escovar Salom	1974–1979
Secretary of Presidency	Efraín Schacht Aristeguieta	1975–1976
Secretary of Presidency	José Luis Salcedo Bastardo	1976–1979
Office of Coordination and Planification	Gumersindo Rodríguez	1974–1977
Office of Coordination and Planification	Lorenzo Azpúrua Marturet	1977–1979

== Domestic policy ==
=== Legislative policy ===
Congress gave Pérez a mandate to rule by decree for 100 days – and then for a further 100 days. He also had a fiscal fortune in his hands such as no Venezuelan president ever had. And Pérez didn’t lose time to start spending it. He commissioned a report on government, which was prepared and carried out by Arnoldo Gabaldón. It contained a blueprint for further large scale bureaucratic expansion. Gabaldón himself was named to a super-ministry, which combined public works and communications. Since it was impossible to hire every Venezuelan, Pérez decreed that all public places should have bathroom attendants and that every elevator the country over should have an operator, although Venezuela had only had one or two hand-operated elevators before the Pérez Jiménez building euphoria. Contracts were handed out with abandon, and Venezuelans applauded with gusto. Pérez proclaimed that the oil wealth would not be squandered and founded a huge fund for "productive investments". This fund was exhausted very quickly. Congress had surrendered its power of fiscal oversight, one of the historical bases of democracy.

=== Economics ===
==== Nationalization of iron and oil ====
One of the most radical aspects of Pérez's program for government was the notion that petroleum oil was a tool for under-developed nations like Venezuela to attain first world status and usher a fairer, more equitable international order. International events, including the Yom Kippur War of 1973, contributed to the implementation of this vision.

In 1975, the iron industry was nationalized and, the following year, the oil industry was nationalized, creating the company Petróleos de Venezuela, S.A. (PDVSA). International events, including the Yom Kippur War of 1973, contributed to the implementation of Pérez's vision, as the drastic increase in oil prices that led to an economic boom for the country just as Pérez began his term in office.

His policies, including the nationalization of the iron and petroleum industries, investment in large state-owned industrial projects for the production of aluminium and hydroelectric energy, infrastructure improvements, and the funding of social welfare and scholarship programs, were extremely ambitious and involved massive government spending, to the tune of almost $53 billion. His measures to protect the environment and foster sustainable development earned him the Earth Care award in 1975, the first time a Latin American leader had received this recognition.

Yet Pérez's credentials as a nationalist leader were not soiled. In fact, for many they were enhanced because in 1975 he nationalized the iron industry, and in 1976 he jumped further and nationalized the oil industry. Since by that time Venezuela was equipped to manage it, not much harm was done by that in itself, but with all the new collaterals that the government could offer, Pérez, after having gone through the "surplus" for investments, started taking out international loans and not small ones but sizable ones. Pérez "statized" the Venezuelan economy to such a degree that the load of paperwork to open a business was so heavy that a service branch was created called "permisología" (approximately, the "science of permits"), to which businessmen had to recur as a matter of course if they wanted to get the necessary bureaucratic approval. Permisologia was not meant to deter foreigners, and it was more burdensome on Venezuelan small entrepreneurs than on any other economic sector. Leftists were in a dazzled quandary because, on one hand, they disliked Pérez, but, on the other, they couldn’t complain about the state's interference because that was part of their own social and economic agenda. Labor unions, which in Venezuela were corrupt and pervasive and AD-managed, stood solidly behind Pérez.

==== Oil boom ====
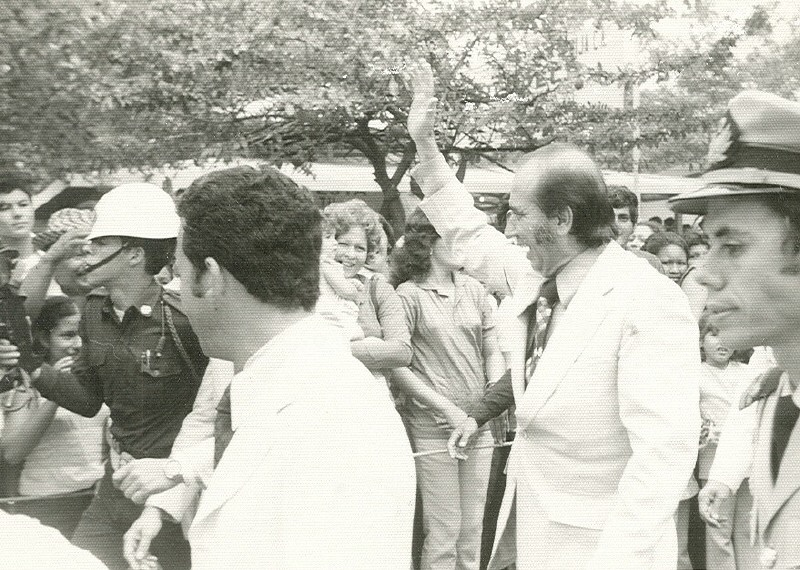
Carlos Andrés Pérez during his first term in office.

Most people in Venezuela with a minimum of money and initiative could go to Miami and bring back a suitcase full of products that were sold to customers, generally friends or neighbors. Even servants' quarters were part of this informal import economy network. In Miami, Venezuelans became known as the "gimme two" people (due to a popular Venezuelan expression, "Ta' barato, dame dos"). The government of Carlos Andrés Pérez had an average poverty rate of 13%, and this era is remembered as "Saudi Venezuela". During this period, significant amounts of capital left Venezuela, especially in the later years.

==== Economic indicators ====
The GDP per capita of the economy grew by an average of 0.27% annually. Meanwhile, the average unemployment rate was 5.88%, while average annual inflation reached 8.2%. In addition, the poverty index increased by 5 points compared to the previous democratic period and remained at an average of 14.08 points, although by the end of the period the poverty index had fallen to 11.67.

=== Education policy ===
During the government of Carlos Andrés Pérez, the Biblioteca Ayacucho and the Gran Mariscal de Ayacucho Program were created. At the same time, the National System of Youth and Children's Orchestras and Choirs of Venezuela was created under the initiative and leadership of the Venezuelan musician José Antonio Abreu.

=== Environment ===
Pérez introduced legislation to protect the environment, whereas Caldera had tried to build a road into the vast southern area of Venezuela known as Amazonas, which his government wanted to settle and exploit. Since soils there are barren, all that could have been achieved would have been the destruction of forested areas where only Amerindian tribes and missionaries, both Catholic and Baptist, lived. By the time that Pérez was through with Venezuela, it was palpable that its society was more unequal than it ever had been: The pardos had been done in again, and as to economic diversification, there was essentially none. Even import-substitution in the automobile industry went down the drain when Pérez started importing Dodge Darts and selling them at subsidized prices.

=== Security ===
==== Kidnapping of William Niehous ====
William Niehous was an American businessman kidnapped by far-left guerrillas. His kidnapping was the longest in Venezuelan history, lasting 3 years and 4 months. The government of Carlos Andrés Pérez mobilized quickly for his rescue. There were some controversies in the case; RCTV was shut down for 3 days due to the disclosure of exclusive information about the kidnapping. The founder of the Socialist League, Jorge Antonio Rodríguez, was detained by agents of the DISIP, on suspicion of involvement in the kidnapping; Jorge Antonio Rodríguez was tortured and died on July 25 of that year from a heart attack. Deputy Salom Mesa was also accused of being involved in the kidnapping, and his parliamentary immunity was lifted; he was imprisoned for two years in the San Carlos Barracks.

=== Human Rights ===
During Pérez's first government, the non-governmental organization Committee for the Defence of Human Rights (CDDH) denounced cases of forced disappearance, as well as the claims of relatives searching for the bodies of the victims. The CDDH also denounced harassment, persecution, and arrests carried out against labor and student leaders and activists linked to certain leftist groups.

In 1975, following the escape of a group of prisoners from the San Carlos barracks, approximately 200 people were arrested for alleged involvement in the escape. Some were later released after it was proven that they had not participated in the incident. The CDDH denounced the mistreatment suffered by the detainees and the prohibition on receiving family visits.

That same year, the murder of nine young people in a boarding house occurred, a case that became known as the Valencia massacre. In response to the increase in cases of arbitrary detentions and extrajudicial executions committed by the Judicial Police Technical Corps (PTJ), the CDDH requested the repeal of the Vagrancy and Misconduct Law and the elimination of a crime-fighting plan known as the "Christmas Plan."

In 1976, guerrilla fighter and leader of the Red Flag Party, Tito González Heredia, died from wounds sustained in an alleged confrontation with Directorate of Intelligence and Prevention Services (DISIP) officials. While being treated at a hospital, a bullet was removed from his head, leading to speculation of a possible execution. González Heredia's death, combined with previous complaints of human rights violations, led the CDDH to file a complaint with the public prosecutor's office against the directors of DISIP and the PTJ, although the complaint did not succeed.

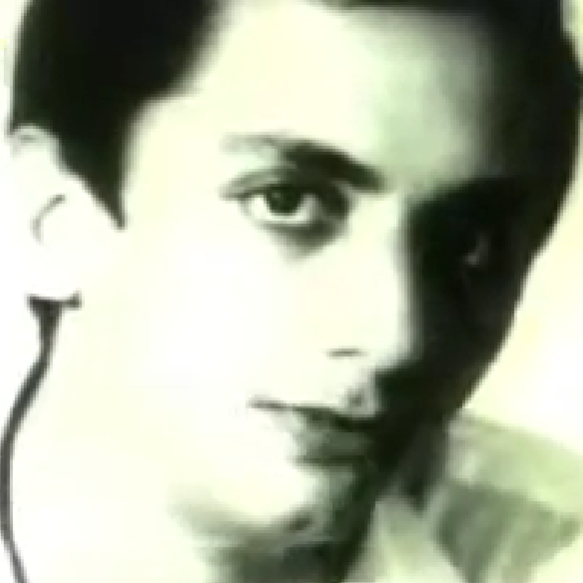
Jorge Rodríguez, founder of the Socialist League, was tortured and murdered by agents of the DISIP in 1976

After the death of Jorge Rodríguez, leader of the Socialist League, due to torture suffered following his detention, the Congressional Commission on Human Rights and Constitutional Guarantees urged that the former director of DISIP be interrogated, and President Carlos Andrés Pérez defined the murder as "unclassifiable and unjustifiable." In 1978, those responsible for his death were arrested.

On August 27, 1975, the director of the Chilean National Intelligence Directorate (DINA), Manuel Contreras, held a meeting with Cuban official Rafael Rivas Vázquez, director of the Venezuelan intelligence agency DISIP. According to an investigation by journalist John Dinges, the meeting sought to secure Venezuela's collaboration with Operation Condor, a cooperation program among South American dictatorships to capture and disappear political dissidents.

Some of these dissidents were refugees in Venezuela, and there was interest in capturing them, but the agreement was not reached due to the opposition of President Pérez.

The Pérez government granted asylum to several political dissidents persecuted by dictatorial regimes. In 1976, following the establishment of a dictatorial regime in Argentina, various activists and organizations expressed solidarity with the persecuted. That year, with the participation of Venezuelan deputy Orestes Di Giacomo and several activists, the Venezuelan Committee for Solidarity with the Argentine People (CVSPA) was created, tasked with denouncing human rights violations and providing support to refugees.

== Foreign policy ==
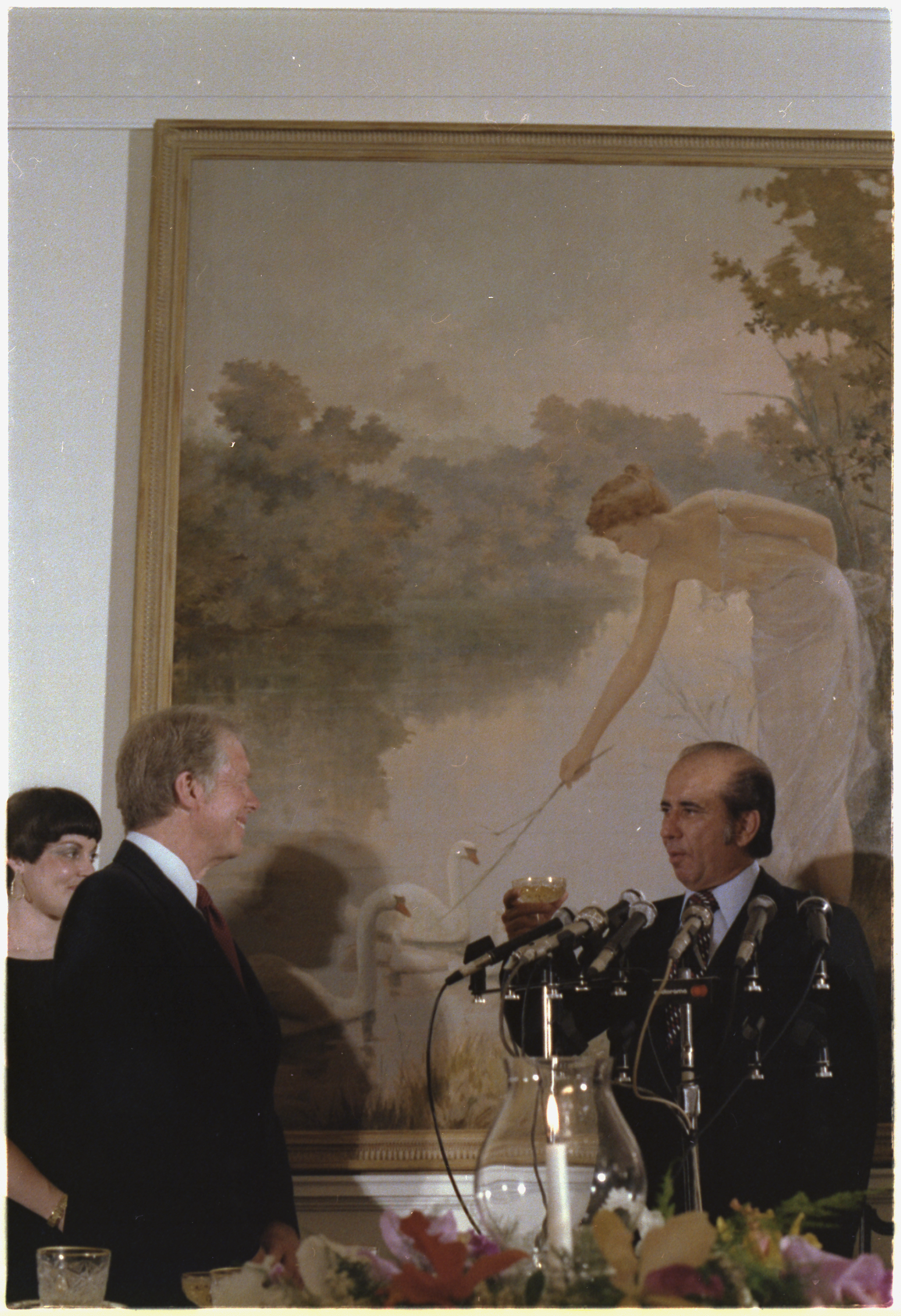
Jimmy Carter and CAP in 1977

In the international arena, Pérez supported democratic and progressive causes in Latin America and the world. He opposed the Somoza and Pinochet dictatorships and played a crucial role in the finalizing of the agreement for the transfer of the Panama Canal from American to Panamanian control. In 1975, with Mexican President Luis Echeverría, he found SELA, the Latin American Economic System, created to foster economic cooperation and scientific exchange between the nations of Latin America. He also supported the democratization process in Spain, as he brought Felipe González, who was living in exile, back to Spain in a private flight and thus strengthened the Spanish Socialist Workers' Party.

The foreign relations of the first Pérez's government were characterized by a shift toward a non-aligned position in the context of the Cold War, while maintaining alignment with the West.

Continuing with the foreign policy that Venezuela had maintained since 1958, during that time the country opened its doors to numerous exiles from the dictatorships of the Southern Cone, while also lending money to other Latin American countries.

On the other hand, the Mariscal José Antonio Sucre scholarship program brought students from Venezuela to study in other countries. According to historian Tomás Straka, Carlos Andrés Pérez has been widely described as having intentions of becoming leader of the so-called Third World. In 1976 Pérez became the vice president of the Socialist International.

=== Americas ===
==== Argentina ====
On 11 May 1977 Argentine dictator Jorge Rafael Videla traveled to Venezuela, where he was received by Carlos Andrés Pérez. Videla gave a conference to the Venezuelan press where he denied that there was "discontent within the Armed Forces" and acknowledged "an excess of repression in the security forces".

==== Cuba ====
The government of Carlos Andrés Pérez reestablished relations with Cuba, broken since 1961 as a result of the Betancourt doctrine.

==== Chile ====
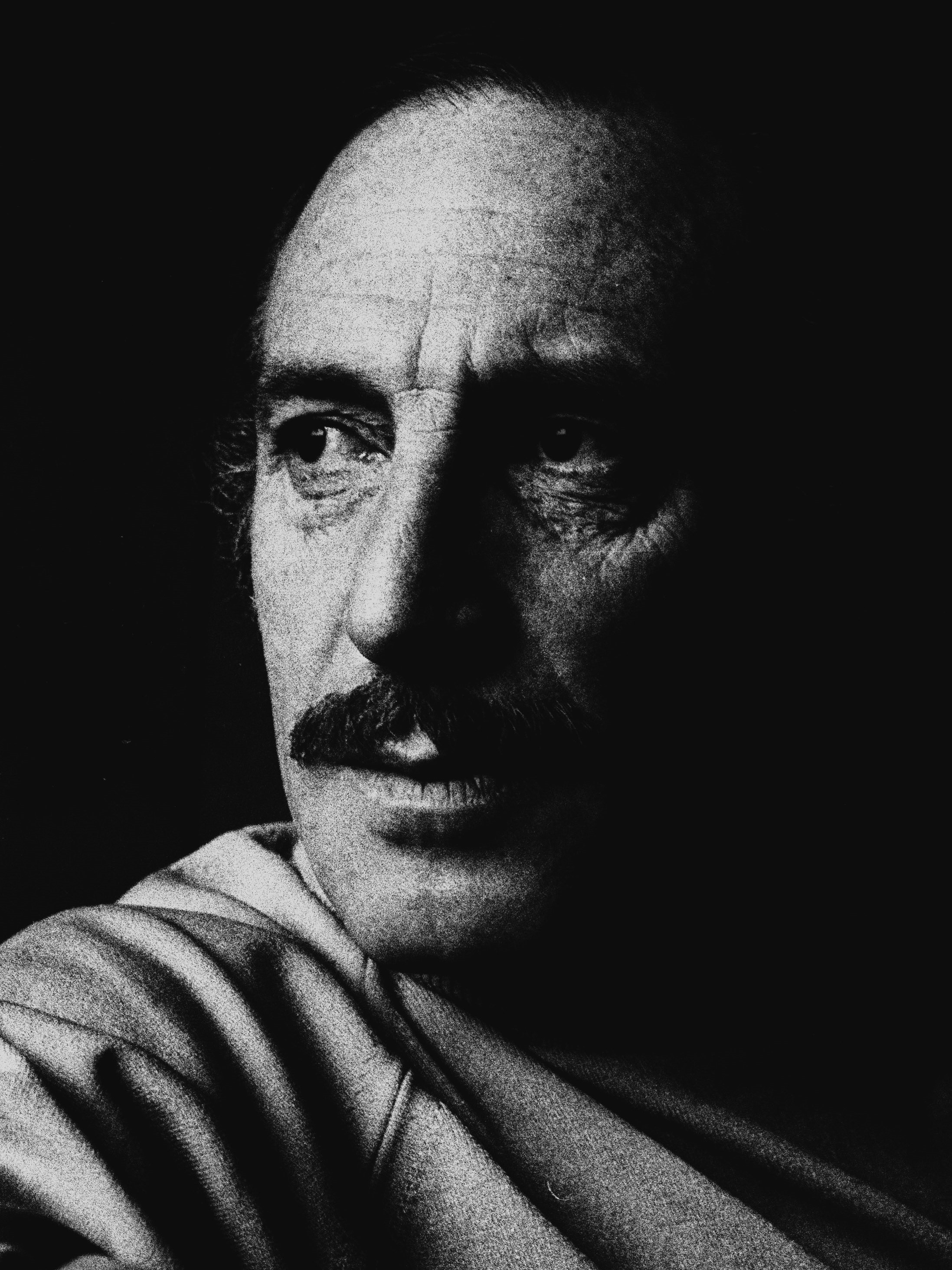
The government of Pérez successfully negotiated the release of Chilean politician Orlando Letelier in 1974 and gave him a state funeral after his assassination two years later.

Diego Arria was sent to Chile in 1974 to negotiate with the dictatorship of Augusto Pinochet the release of former foreign minister of Salvador Allende, Orlando Letelier, a mission that was successful. After this, Letelier was hired by Arria as an adviser in the Caracas governorship for six months, as was former Minister of Health Arturo Jirón. After the assassination of Orlando Letelier in Washington, D.C. in 1976, Arria went to the United States to personally seek his body, taking it to Caracas, where he was given a state funeral, in which President Pérez participated together with his cabinet.

==== Nicaragua ====
Sergio Ramírez, former vice president of Nicaragua, declared that Carlos Andrés Pérez financed the Sandinista guerrillas with more than 100,000 dollars monthly so that they would overthrow dictator Anastasio Somoza.

==== Panama ====
Carlos Andrés Pérez allied himself with Omar Torrijos Herrera, negotiating in favor of Panama in the transition of the canal into Panamanian hands.

==== United States ====
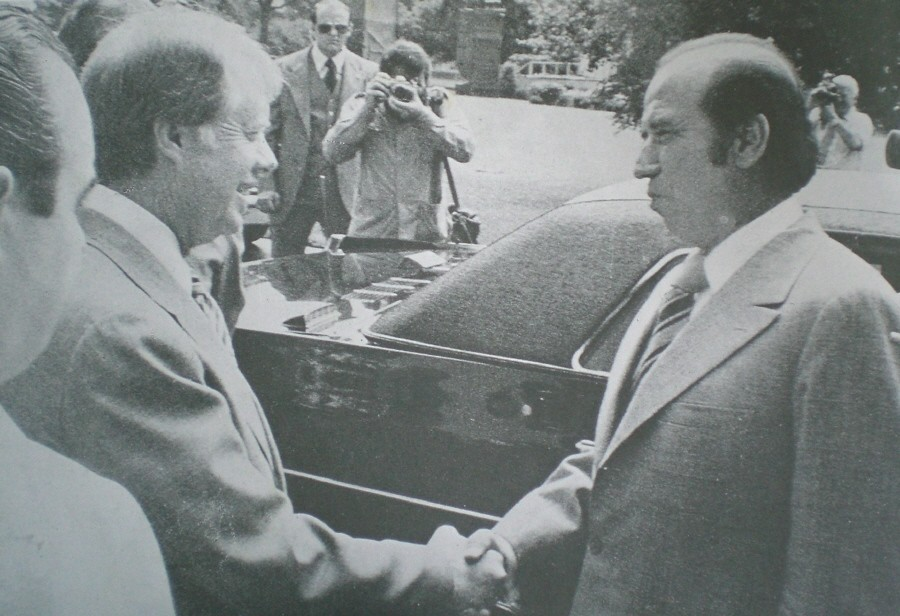
U.S. president Jimmy Carter shakes hands with CAP. 1978.

In 1978 Pérez signed a boundary treaty with the United States that established the maritime boundaries of Aves Island with respect to Puerto Rico and the Virgin Islands.

==== Uruguay ====
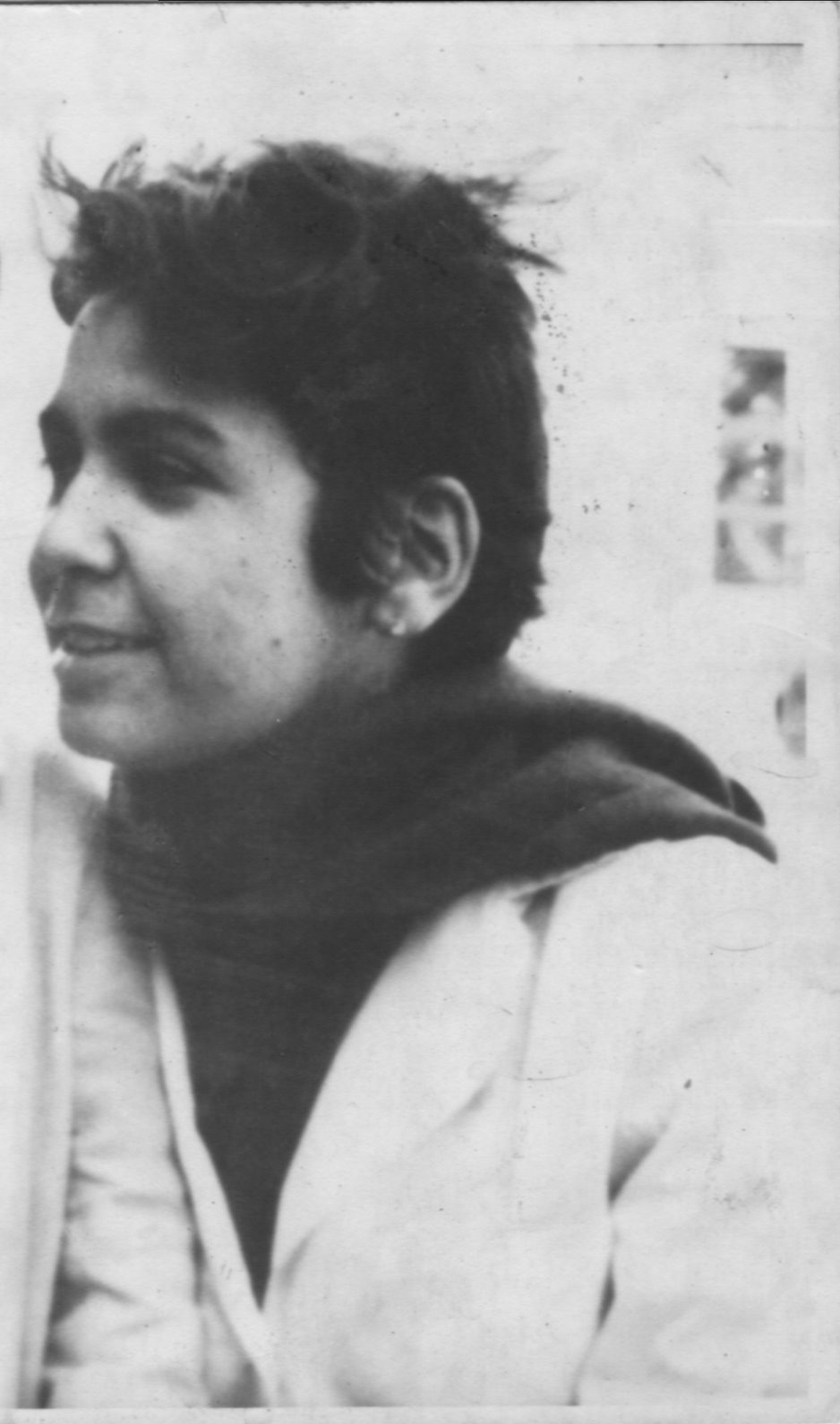
Venezuela broke relations with Uruguay after the violent episode of the kidnapping of Elena Quinteros in the Venezuelan embassy in Uruguay.

In 1976 Uruguayan teacher and political activist Elena Quinteros, part of the Party for the Victory of the People, was forced by the state forces of the dictatorship of Aparicio Méndez to contact one of her fellow activists, for which she escaped and hid in the gardens of the Venezuelan embassy in Montevideo, where two embassy diplomats tried to help her. However, they were injured, while Elena was captured and subsequently disappeared.

The government of Pérez protested the events, requesting guarantees for Quinteros' life and breaking relations with Uruguay on 6 July 1976. The Uruguayan dictatorship responded by giving the Venezuelan ambassador a period of 72 hours to abandon the country. Relations between both countries were interrupted for nine years, until the arrival of democracy in Uruguay during 1985.

=== Asia ===
==== China ====
On 28 June 1974 diplomatic relations were established with China.

==== Palestine ====
The government of CAP protected Ilich Ramírez (known as Carlos the Jackal), member of the Popular Front for the Liberation of Palestine, from British Intelligence during his stay in London, according to diplomat Elías Casado, former consul of Venezuela in London.

=== Europe ===
==== Spain ====
The government of Pérez supported the process of democratization in Spain, playing a role in the negotiations for the Spanish Socialist Workers' Party (PSOE) and the Communist Party of Spain to be legalized.

==== United Kingdom ====
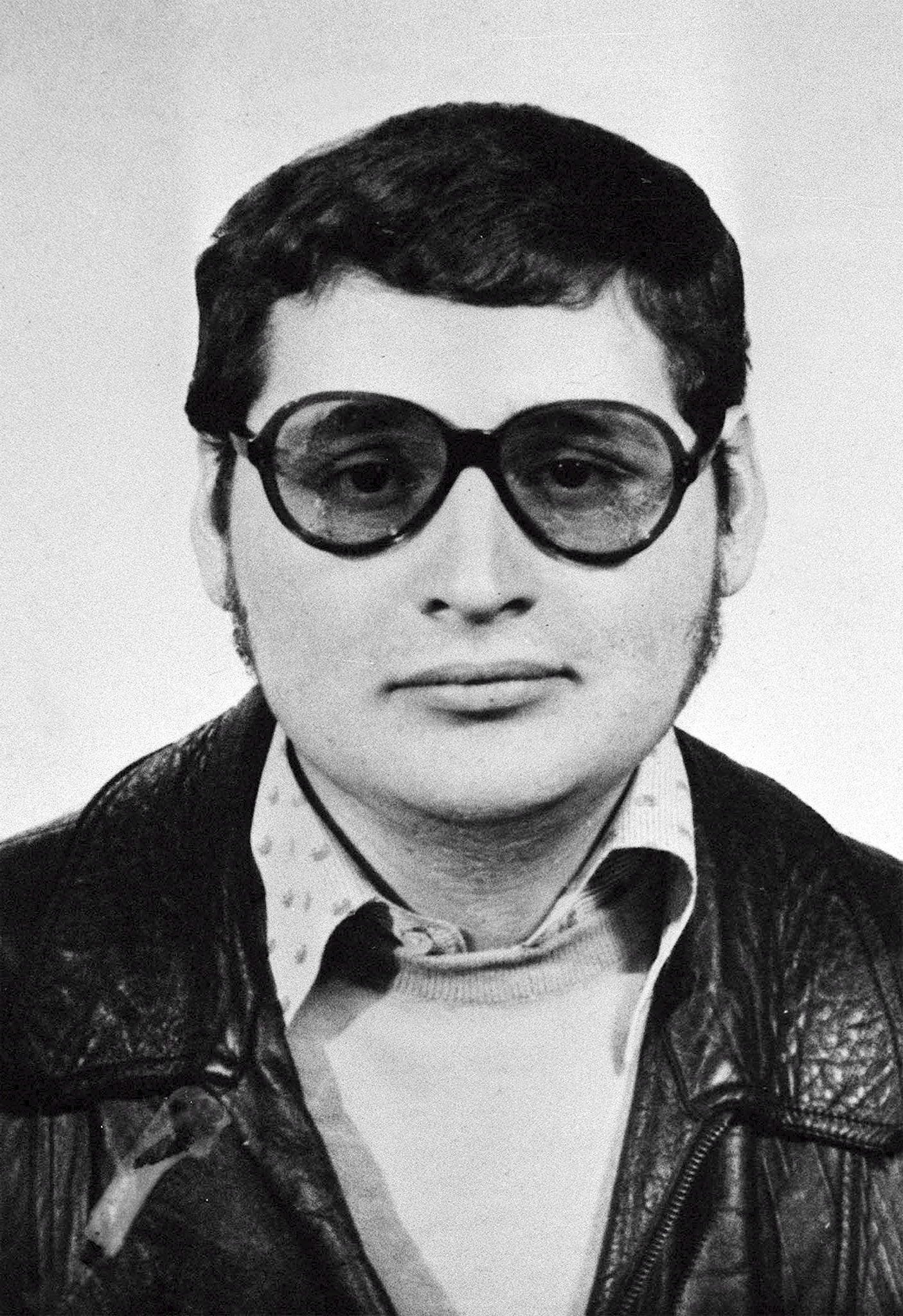
The government of CAP protected Carlos the Jackal, member of the Popular Front for the Liberation of Palestine, during his stay in the United Kingdom in the 1970s.

The government of CAP protected Ilich Ramírez (known as Carlos the Jackal), member of the Popular Front for the Liberation of Palestine, from British Intelligence during his stay in London, according to diplomat Elías Casado, former consul of Venezuela in London. These orders reached Casado through several calls from the director of the private secretariat of the presidency, Gladys Vázquez, and from Cecilia Matos, Pérez's lover, asking him to watch over Carlos.

==== Soviet Union ====
The government of Pérez expanded relations with the Soviet Union (USSR), broken since the government of Rómulo Betancourt as a result of his eponymous doctrine and only recently resumed during the previous government of Rafael Caldera. Invited by the government of the USSR, Pérez visited Moscow on 24 November 1976, with the intention of dealing with issues such as the expansion of cooperation between both countries in the economic and industrial sectors, and with respect to the latter, discussing oil technology. According to Reinaldo Figueredo Planchart, Foreign Minister Escovar Salom refused to travel with Pérez to the Soviet Union in 1976 by order of former president Rómulo Betancourt, for which Figueredo accompanied the president in his place.

==== Yugoslavia ====
On 17 March 1976 Yugoslav president Josip Broz Tito visited Venezuela, meeting with President Carlos Andrés Pérez, and signing a joint communiqué supporting the Non-Aligned Movement, where Venezuela was an observer.

=== International trips ===
==== 1974 ====
Date	Place	Main purpose
December	Lima (Peru)	Commemoration of the Battle of Ayacucho.

==== 1975 ====
Date	Place	Main purpose
17–22 March	(Mexico)	Return visit corresponding to the official visit to Venezuela by President Luis Echeverría the previous year.

==== 1976 ====
Date	Place	Main purpose
24 November	Moscow (Soviet Union)	Invitation by the Soviet government. Discussion on expanding cooperation between the two countries in the economic and industrial sectors, as well as on petroleum technology.

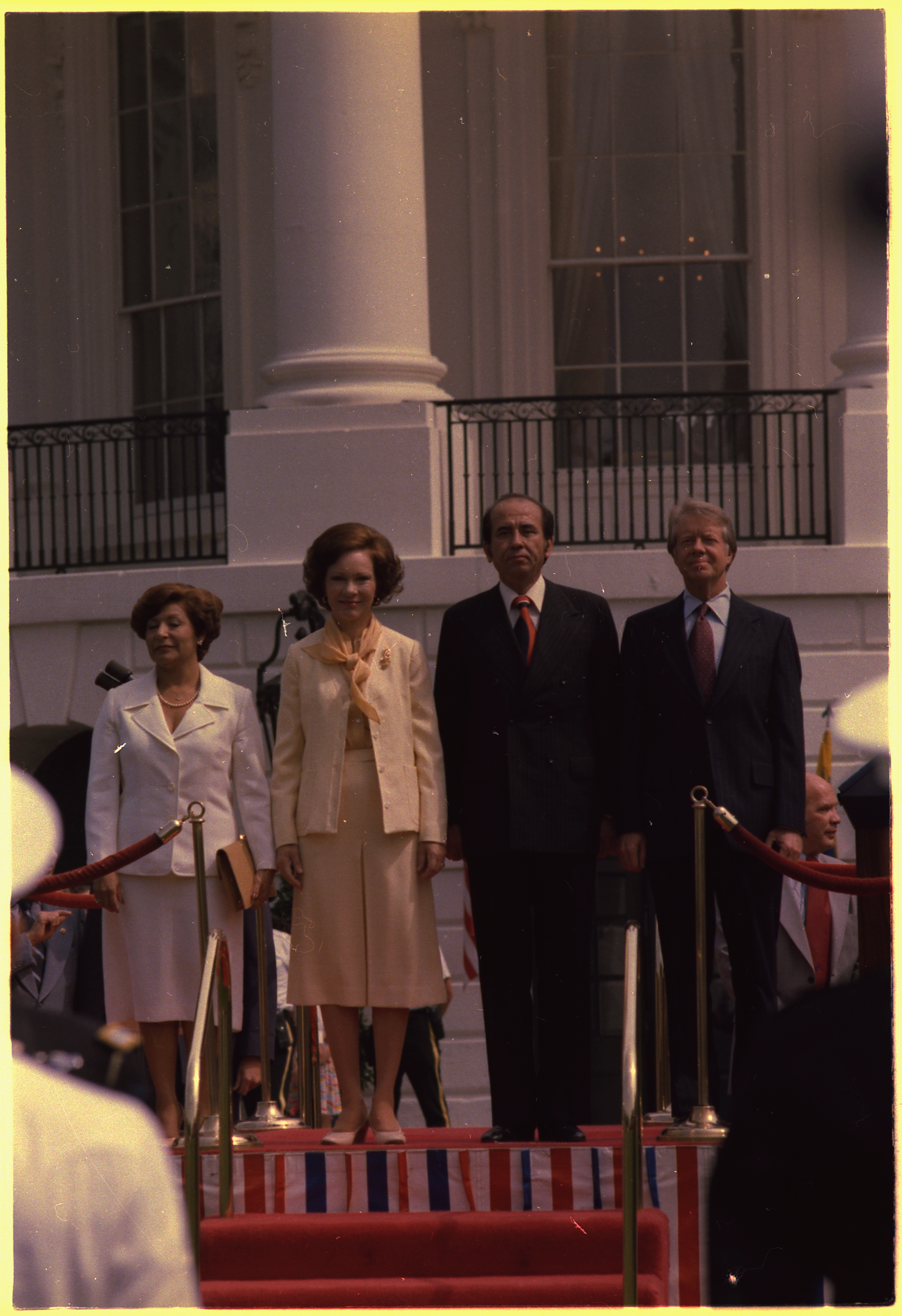
U.S. president Jimmy Carter and Carlos Andrés Pérez at the White House, 1977.

==== 1977 ====
Date	Place	Main purpose
April	(Saudi Arabia)	Official tour of the Middle East.
April	(United Arab Emirates)	Official tour of the Middle East.
April	(Iran)	Official tour of the Middle East.
April	(Iraq)	Official tour of the Middle East.
27 June– 2 July	Williamsburg, New York, Philadelphia, Chicago (United States)	Official visit.
6–9 September	Washington, D.C. (United States)	Attendance at the signing of the Panama Canal Treaty.

==== 1978 ====
Date	Place	Main purpose
6–8 August	Bogotá (Colombia)	Participation in a summit meeting with presidents Alfonso López Michelsen of Colombia; Daniel Oduber of Costa Rica; José López Portillo of Mexico; Omar Torrijos, head of government of Panama; and Jamaican prime minister Michael Manley, concerning negotiations regarding the Panama Canal.

== Corruption ==
The Sierra Nevada affair was a corruption scandal in Venezuela that revolved around the purchase of the Sierra Nevada ship during the first government of Carlos Andrés Pérez.

== Legacy ==
Towards the end of his first term in office, Pérez's reputation was tarnished by accusations of excessive, and disorderly, government spending. His administration was often referred to as Saudi Venezuela for its grandiose and extravagant ambitions. In addition, there were allegations of corruption and trafficking of influence, often involving members of Pérez's intimate circle or financiers and businessmen who donated to his campaign. A well-publicized rift with his former mentor Rómulo Betancourt and disgruntled members of AD all pointed to the fading of Pérez's political standing. By the 1978 elections, there was a sense among many citizens that the influx of petrodollars after 1973 had not been properly managed. The country was importing 80% of all foodstuffs consumed. Agricultural production was stagnant. The national debt had skyrocketed. And whilst per capita income had increased and prosperity was evident in Caracas and other major cities, the country was also more expensive and a significant minority of Venezuelans were still mired in poverty. This malaise led to the defeat of AD at the polls by the opposition Social Christian Party. The newly elected president, Luis Herrera Campins, famously stated in his inaugural speech that he was "inheriting a mortgaged country."

Nonetheless, the memory of CAP's first term proved powerful enough and positive enough in his 1988 electoral campaign to earn him a second term, resulting in the Second Presidency of Carlos Andrés Pérez.

== See also ==
- Carlos Andrés Pérez
- Second Presidency of Carlos Andrés Pérez
- Presidents of Venezuela
