= Second presidency of Carlos Andrés Pérez =

Venezuelan presidential administration (1988–1993)

The second presidency of Carlos Andrés Pérez (1988–1993) started with an economic crisis, a major riot in which hundreds were killed by security forces (Caracazo, 1989), followed by an economic recovery by also two coup attempts in 1992, and his 1993 impeachment. He was the first Venezuelan President to be impeached.

== Background ==
Venezuelan Presidential election 1988
Results

Candidates	Votes	%
Carlos Andrés Pérez	3,868,843	52.76%
Eduardo Fernández	2,955,061	40.40%
Teodoro Petkoff	198,361	2.71%
Abstention:	1,660,887	18.08%
Total votes:	7,524,760

For the 1988 presidential election Democratic Action (AD) President Jaime Lusinchi backed Octavio Lepage as AD candidate, but in a primary election the party chose Carlos Andrés Pérez (previously president from 1974 to 1979).

== Second presidency cabinet (1989–1993) ==
Ministries
OFFICE	NAME	TERM
President	Carlos Andrés Pérez	1989–1993
Home Affairs	Alejandro Izaguirre	1989–1992
Home Affairs	Virgilio Ávila Vivas	1992
Home Affairs	Carmelo Lauría Lesseur	1992
Home Affairs	Luis Piñerúa Ordaz	1992–1993
Home Affairs	Jesús Carmona	1993
Foreign Relations	Enrique Tejera París	1989
Foreign Relations	Reinaldo Figueredo Planchart	1989–1991
Foreign Relations	Armando Durán	1991–1992
Foreign Relations	Humberto Calderón Berti	1992
Foreign Relations	Fernando Ochoa Antich	1992–1993
Finance	Egle Iturbe de Blanco	1989–1990
Finance	Roberto Pocaterra Silva	1990–1992
Finance	Pedro Rosas Bravo	1992–1993
Defense	Italo del Valle Alliegro	1989
Defense	Filmo López Uzcátegui	1989–1990
Defense	Héctor Jurado Toro	1990–1991
Defense	Fernando Ochoa Antich	1991–1992
Defense	Iván Jiménez Sánchez	1992–1993
Development	Moisés Naím	1989–1990
Development	Imelda Cisneros	1990–1992
Development	Pedro Vallenilla Meneses	1992
Development	Frank de Armas Moreno	1992–1993
Education	Gustavo Roosen	1989–1992
Education	Pedro Augusto Beauphertuy	1992–1993
Health and Social Assistance	Felipe Bello González	1989–1990
Health and Social Assistance	Manuel Adrianza	1990–1991
Health and Social Assistance	Pedro Páez Camargo	1991–1992
Health and Social Assistance	Rafael Orihuela	1992–1993
Agriculture	Fanny Bello	1989
Agriculture	Eugenio de Armas	1989–1990
Agriculture	Jonathan Coles Ward	1990–1993
Agriculture	Pedro Luis Urriola	1993
Labor	Marisela Padrón Quero	1989–1991
Labor	Jesús Rubén Rodríguez	1991–1993
Transport and Communications	Gustavo José Rada	1989
Transport and Communications	Augusto Faría Viso	1989–1990
Transport and Communications	Roberto Smith	1990–1992
Transport and Communications	Fernández Martínez Mótola	1992–1993
Justice	Luis Beltrán Guerra	1989–1992
Justice	Alfredo Ducharme	1992–1993
Justice	Armida Quintana Matos	1992-1993
Energy and Mines	Celestino Armas	1989–1992
Energy and Mines	Alirio Parra	1992–1993
Environment	Enrique Colmenares Finol	1989–1993
Urban Development	Luis Penzini Fleury	1989–1992
Urban Development	Diógenes Mujica	1992–1993
Family	Senta Essenfeld	1989–1992
Family	Mabely de León Ponte	1992
Family	Teresa Albánez	1992–1993
Secretary of Presidency	Reinaldo Figueredo Planchart	1989
Secretary of Presidency	Jesús Carmona	1989–1990
Secretary of Presidency	Armando Durán	1990–1991
Secretary of Presidency	Beatrice Rangel Mantilla	1991–1992
Secretary of Presidency	Celestino Armas	1992–1993
Office of Coordination and Planification	Miguel Antonio Rodríguez	1989–1992
Office of Coordination and Planification	Ricardo Hausmann	1992–1993
National Council of Culture	José Antonio Abreu	1989–1993
CVG	Leopoldo Sucre Figarella	1989–1993
Presidential Commission for the Reform of the State	Carlos Blanco	1989–1992

== Domestic policy ==
=== Economy ===
Carlos Andrés Pérez based his campaign for the 1988 Venezuelan general election in his legacy of abundance during his first presidential period and initially rejected liberalization policies. However, Venezuela's international reserves were only $300 million USD at the time of Pérez' election into the presidency; Pérez decided to respond to the debt, public spending, economic restrictions and rentier state by liberalizing the economy. He announced a technocratic cabinet and a group of economic policies to fix macroeconomic imbalances known as El Gran Viraje (English: The Great Turn), called by detractors as El Paquetazo Económico (English: The Economic Package). Among the policies there was the reduction of fuel subsidies and the increase of public transportation fares by thirty percent (VEB 16 Venezuelan bolívares, or $0.4 USD).

The increase was supposed to be implemented on 1 March 1989, but bus drivers decided to apply the price rise on 27 February, a day before payday in Venezuela. In response, protests and rioting began on the morning of 27 February 1989 in Guarenas, a town near Caracas; a lack of timely intervention by authorities, as the Caracas Metropolitan Police was on a labour strike, led the protests and rioting quickly spread to the capital and other towns across the country. President Andrés Pérez ordered the activation of Plan Ávila and the intervention of the military. A commission was established in the Venezuelan Congress with all its political parties to investigate the events during the Caracazo and unanimously voted for a report that concluded that 277 people were killed, though the Venezuelan media reported up to 3,000 deaths.

By late 1991, as part of the economic reforms, Carlos Andrés Pérez' administration had sold three banks, a shipyard, two sugar mills, an airline, a telephone company and a cell phone band, receiving a total of $2,287 million USD. The most remarkable auction was CANTV's, a telecommunications company, which was sold at the price of $1,885 million USD to the consortium composed of American AT&T International, General Telephone Electronic and the Venezuelan Electricidad de Caracas and Banco Mercantil. The privatization ended Venezuela's monopoly over telecommunications and surpassed even the most optimistic predictions, with over $1,000 million USD above the base price and $500 million USD more than the bid offered by the competition group. By the end of the year, inflation had dropped to 31 %, Venezuela's international reserves were now worth $14,000 million USD and there was an economic growth of 9 % (called as an "Asian growth"), the largest in Latin America at the time.

=== Defense policy ===
In 1992, Provea reported that several transportation sector workers in the city of Maracaibo were forcibly recruited while at work. Likewise, it reported cases of students from the Central University of Venezuela who were subjected to forced conscription.

=== Security policy ===
Following the 1992 coup attempts, state forces carried out raids throughout the country, arbitrarily detaining student leaders, members of political parties and social activists, according to allegations by Amnesty International. Most were released shortly afterward without charges; however, the NGO stated in a 1993 report that "many were tortured".

==== Catia Prison massacre ====
The Catia Prison massacre occurred during the failed coup attempt of 27 November 1992. In the early hours of 27 November 1992, agents of the National Guard of Venezuela and the Metropolitan Police of Caracas intervened in the prison facility of the Catia Detention Center. During the 48 hours in which the events took place inside the Catia Detention Center, approximately 63 inmates were killed.

=== Media policy ===
Journalist Jesús Antonio Castillo Gómez, correspondent for El Nacional, was arrested and tortured with an electric prod by police officers, who later confiscated his camera after he covered a demonstration on 23 January 1992 at the Central University of Venezuela (UCV). This was denounced by Amnesty International.

=== Human rights policy ===
In 1989, Father Luis María Olaso worked together with the Human Rights Vicariate directed by Father Ubaldo Santana and the Justice and Peace Commission, giving asylum to two survivors of the Amparo massacre and denouncing the application of military justice to try them. After the Caracazo, Father Olaso was appointed head of the Human Rights Directorate of the Office of the Attorney General of the Republic, from where he denounced human rights violations and supported victims of the Amparo massacre, the Caracazo and the Catia Prison massacre.

Following the events of the Caracazo, relatives and activists formed the organization Committee of Relatives and Victims of the Events of February-March 1989 (COFAVIC). This NGO collaborated in and pressured the exhumation process, and also denounced obstruction of the process and constant harassment by the authorities. The Military Intelligence Division (DIM) accused it of being a front for guerrilla groups, which led the organization together with Amnesty International, Human Rights Watch, the Human Rights Vicariate and the Archdiocese of Caracas to denounce before the prosecutor's office the criminalization to which it was being subjected.

Likewise, the human rights organization PROVEA was accused of being a "front organization for far-left groups". In 1991, attorney Edwin Sambrano Vidal, a member of the NGO, was detained.

Human Rights Watch stated in a 1993 report that Pérez's second administration "was marked by an increase in human rights violations, including arbitrary arrests, torture, extrajudicial executions, and the violent repression of demonstrations", and that the judiciary largely ignored the abuses committed. They denounced impunity for police officers allegedly involved in abuses of authority through a procedure known as averiguación de nudo hecho. Under this procedure, investigations were prolonged for long periods, avoiding the prosecution of those implicated. Mention was also made of corruption and impunity within the judicial system and the trial of civilians in military courts.

Meanwhile, Amnesty International denounced that investigations into human rights violations were scarce or nonexistent. It mentioned the increase in arbitrary arrests and extrajudicial executions, mainly in poor neighborhoods, and that judicial proceedings were generally delayed and lacked independence, causing detainees to remain imprisoned for prolonged periods while also being subjected to mistreatment and sometimes torture. The organization also referred to the application of the Law on Vagrants and Criminals, under which detainees were denied basic rights such as access to lawyers or judicial hearings. These conditions provoked constant protests by detainees, some of which were controlled with excessive use of force.

Likewise, Amnesty International denounced the conditions in the country's prisons, detailing corruption among authorities, overcrowding, use of punishment cells, inadequate food and lack of medical attention. It also denounced the disproportionate use of force by state security bodies to control demonstrations, including the use of firearms that caused injuries and deaths. Amnesty International likewise mentioned the harassment and attacks suffered by activists and journalists during anti-government demonstrations and some cases of censorship.

== Foreign policy ==
Relations were established with Benin, Latvia and Lithuania. In 1992 Venezuela suspended diplomatic relations with Peru, after the self-coup carried out by Alberto Fujimori against the Peruvian Congress.

=== Africa ===
==== Benin ====
On 20 June 1991 formal diplomatic relations were established with Benin.

=== Americas ===
==== Cuba ====
Carlos Andrés Pérez invited Fidel Castro to his presidential inauguration, which would be his first visit to the country in thirty years. Former commander of the Venezuelan Army, Carlos Julio Peñaloza, declared that Castro had helped Venezuelan leftists with weapons and advice in the preparations for the Caracazo.

Fidel Castro condemned the first coup attempt against CAP in 1992, giving his public support to the president, with whom he had a good relationship.

On 23 October 1991, Pérez met in Mexico with Castro together with Colombian president César Gaviria and Mexican president Carlos Salinas in an attempt to convince Castro to introduce political reforms in the Cuban government.

==== United States ====
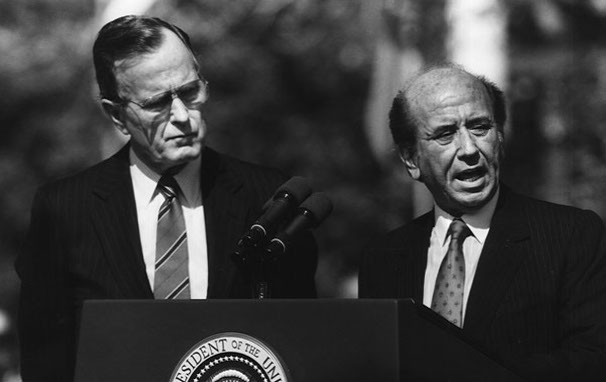
George H. W. Bush and CAP in Washington.

President Pérez visited the United States seven times, meeting with president George H. W. Bush. Bush, for his part, visited Caracas in December 1990 during the Gulf crisis caused by the Iraqi invasion of Kuwait, in order to secure the alliance with Venezuela and maintain the oil supply.

==== Peru ====
Carlos Andrés Pérez suspended diplomatic relations with Peru in April 1992, after the self-coup carried out by Alberto Fujimori against Congress. The government of Alberto Fujimori granted political asylum to 93 coup-plotting soldiers who participated in the second coup attempt of that year, assuring that both the Hercules C-130 aircraft used by the coup plotters and the weapons confiscated from them would be returned to Venezuela.

=== Europe ===
==== Spain ====
As part of an agreement between Venezuela, Spain and France, Venezuela received members of ETA. The Spanish ambassador in Caracas, Amaro González de Mesa García San Miguel, declared that he prepared the arrival of 20 ETA members between 1989 and 1990 together with the Secretary of State for Security, Rafael Vera, and with the director general of the Civil Guard, Luis Roldán, clarifying that "they welcomed them, not to favor ETA, but as a courtesy to Spain, and that earned Carlos Andrés Pérez very harsh criticism in the press" and that "the ETA members were installed in a hotel, but then they were shot at and had to disperse into the interior of the country". González also declared that, in his opinion, the shooting may have been arranged by the Venezuelan Police itself in order to force their departure from the capital. In this way, CAP continued the policies of Jaime Lusinchi, who had also received ETA members during his government.

=== Multilateral organizations ===
==== Andean Group ====
The government of Pérez hosted in Caracas the Fifth Meeting of the Presidential Council of the Andean Group on 17 and 18 May 1991, where it was decided to initiate a regional free trade area beginning on 1 January 1992.

==== G15 ====
In November 1991 Caracas hosted the Second Summit of the Group of Fifteen (G-15).

=== International trips ===
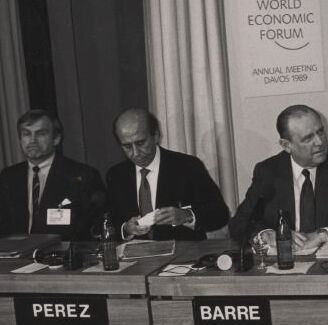
Carlos Andrés Pérez at the Annual Meeting of the World Economic Forum in Davos, Switzerland, 1989.

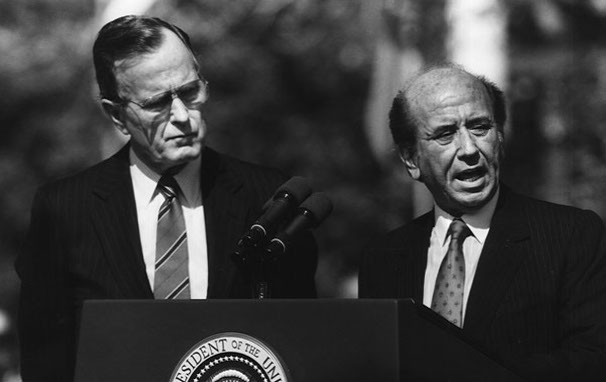
Carlos Andrés Pérez and U.S. president George H. W. Bush during his visit to Washington, D.C.

==== 1989 ====
Date	Place	Main purpose
February	Davos (Switzerland)	World Economic Forum summit.
30 March–1 April	Atlanta (United States)	Private visit. Subsequently attended the Consultation on a New Hemispheric Agenda in Atlanta.
25 September	New York (United States)	United Nations General Assembly.

==== 1990 ====
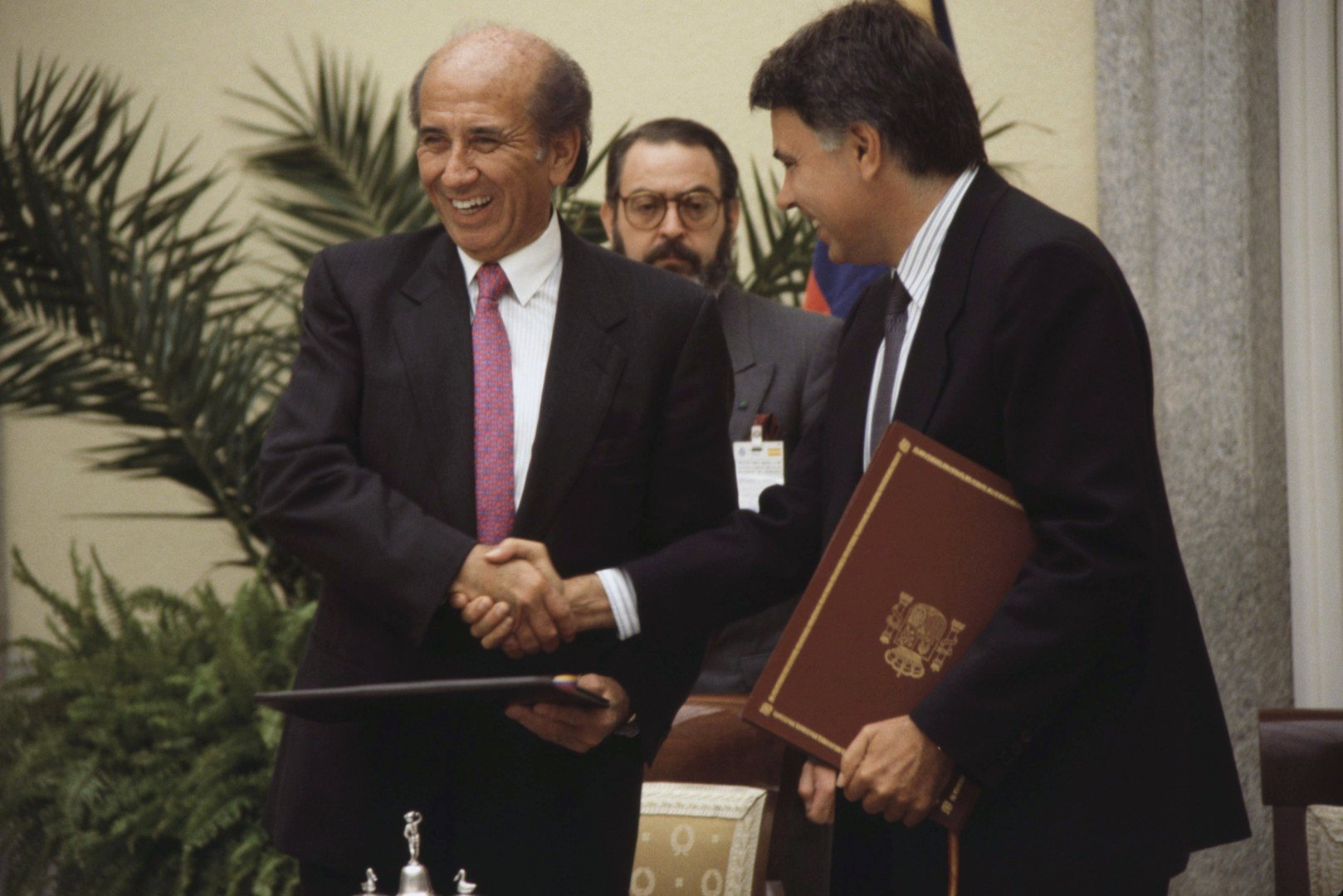
Signing of the Treaty of Friendship and Cooperation between Spain and Venezuela by Carlos Andrés Pérez and Spanish prime minister Felipe González, 1990

Date	Place	Main purpose
6 June	Madrid (Spain)	
25–26 April	New York (United States)	Official visit. Subsequently a private visit to New York.
30 September	New York (United States)	United Nations General Assembly.

==== 1991 ====
Date	Place	Main purpose
3 May	Houston, Tulsa, Palo Alto (United States)	Private visit to President George H. W. Bush. Visits to Houston, Tulsa, and Palo Alto.
24 September	New York (United States)	United Nations General Assembly.
22–23 October	(Mexico)	

==== 1992 ====
Date	Place	Main purpose
3 May	New York (United States)	Summit of the United Nations Security Council.

== Impeachment ==
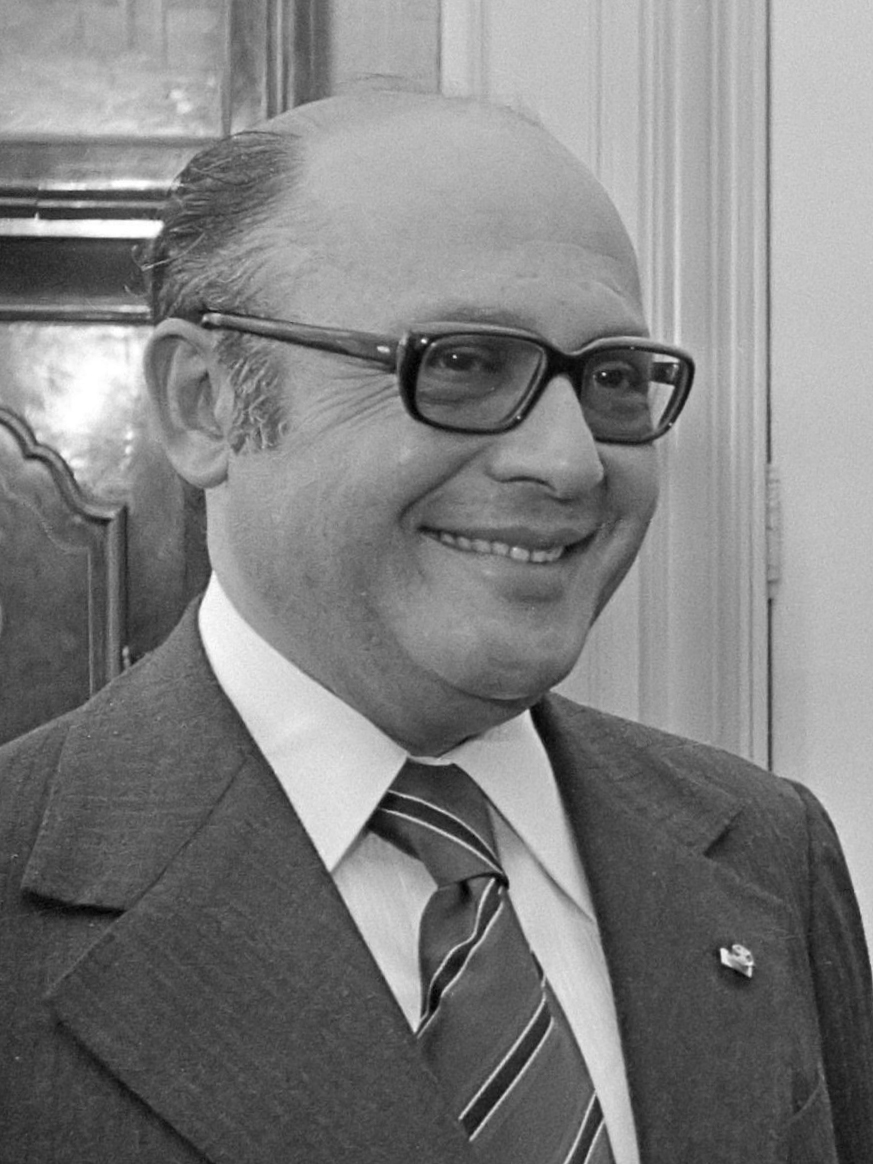
Attorney General Ramón Escovar Salom.

On 20 March 1993, Attorney General Ramón Escovar Salom, introduced action against Pérez for the misappropriation of 250 million bolivars belonging to a presidential discretionary fund, or partida secreta. The issue had originally been brought to public scrutiny in November 1992 by journalist José Vicente Rangel. The money was used to support the electoral process in Nicaragua, and during the process it was revealed that the money was used to support and hire bodyguards for President Violeta Chamorro. On 20 May 1993, the Supreme Court considered the accusation valid, and the following day the Senate voted to strip Pérez of his immunity. Pérez resigned that evening to face trial, shortly after the decision of the Supreme Court, and was formally removed from power on the 21st of May 1993.

Pérez' trial concluded in May 1996, and he was sentenced to 28 months in prison.

== Opposition ==
=== Social opposition ===
According to Provea, between October 1989 and September 1992 there were 2,094 protests in Venezuela.

==== Caracazo ====
Faced with the inability of the local police to control looting in a riot in Caracas known as the Caracazo, Pérez's government employed the Army as a means of containing the violent events occurring throughout the city (a riot control strategy known as Plan Ávila was activated). A commission was established in the Congress of Venezuela with all its political parties to investigate the events of the Caracazo, and it unanimously approved a report concluding that 277 people had been killed.

The actions of the armed forces came at a high cost, as they engaged in excessive repression that, according to official figures, left 277 dead and numerous wounded. Approximately 2,000 people disappeared during 27 and 28 February 1989. For this reason, in the days and months following the Caracazo a large number of demonstrations against him took place, which together with political criticism made by several parties and sectors against him and his program weakened the political foundation on which he relied. During the crisis produced by the first Gulf War, Venezuela increased its crude oil production, which temporarily alleviated the economic situation although it did not reduce social conflict. In 1999, the Inter-American Court of Human Rights addressed the case of the Caracazo and ruled that Pérez's government had committed various human rights violations against citizens, including extrajudicial executions.

=== Military opposition ===
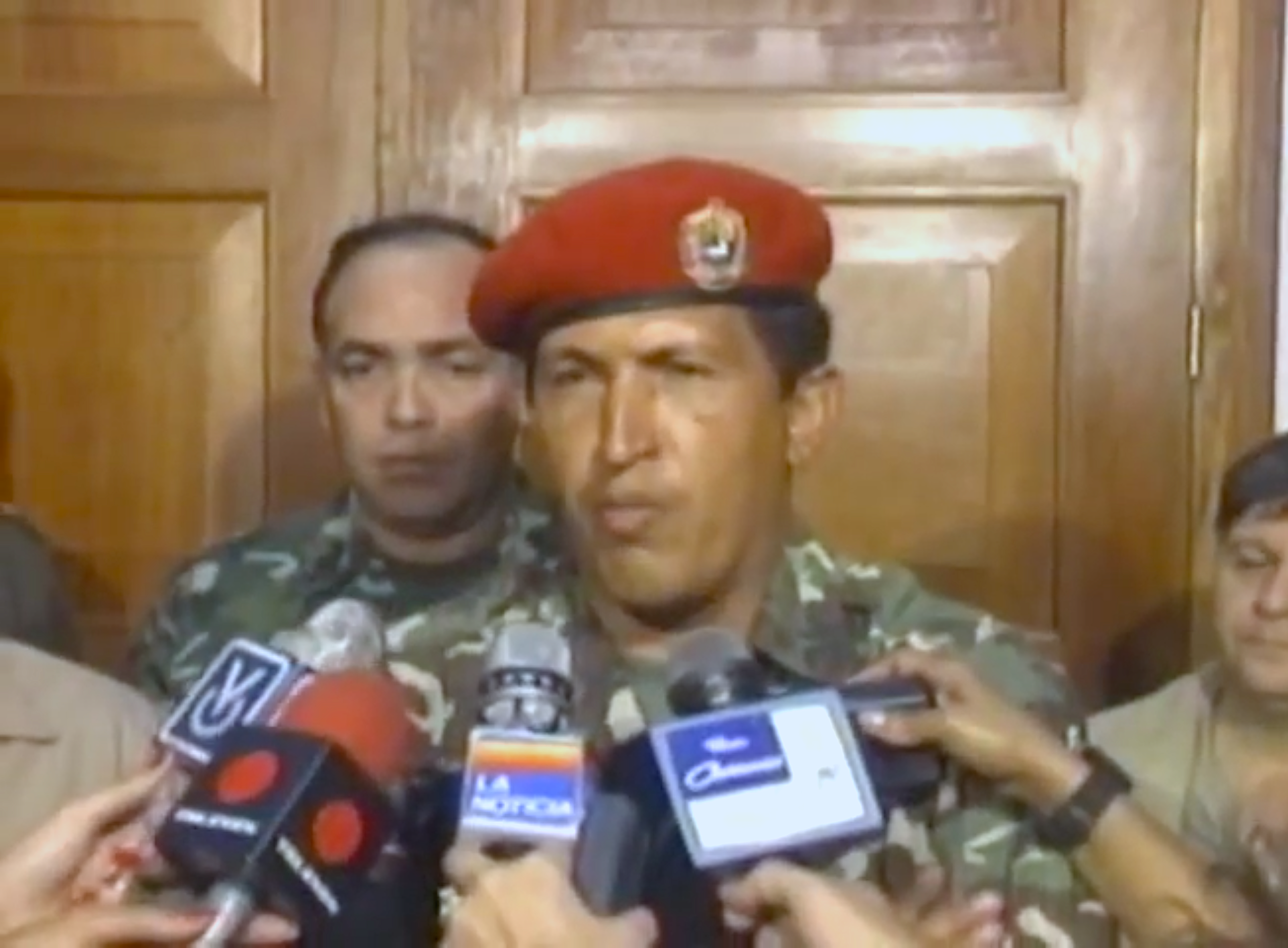
Lieutenant Colonel Hugo Chávez, a member of the Revolutionary Bolivarian Movement-200, publicly surrenders after the attempted coup d'état of February 4, 1992

In 1992, his government survived two coup attempts. The first attempt took place 4 February 1992, and was led by Lieutenant-Colonel Hugo Chávez from the Venezuelan Army, who was later elected president. With the attempt having clearly failed, Chávez was catapulted into the national spotlight when he was allowed to appear live on national television to call for all remaining rebel detachments in Venezuela to cease hostilities. When he did so, Chávez famously quipped on national television that he had only failed "por ahora"—"for now".

The second, and much bloodier, insurrection took place on 27 November 1992, and this time, civilians and military personnel from both the Venezuelan Air Force and the Bolivarian Navy of Venezuela were involved. The coup plotters managed to seize the facilities of the state television channel Venezolana de Televisión, bomb some public buildings such as the Miraflores Palace, the Ministry of Foreign Affairs, and the La Carlota Airport. The attempt was defeated but once again contributed to worsening the already discredited image of the president. The death toll from both coup attempts was approximately 300 victims, of which 172 died during the second coup attempt.

== See also ==
- Second inauguration of Carlos Andrés Pérez
- First presidency of Carlos Andrés Pérez
- Interim government of Octavio Lepage
- Interim government of Ramón J. Velásquez

== Bibliography ==
- Márquez, Laureano; Sanabria, Eduardo (2018). "La democracia pierde energía". Historieta de Venezuela: De Macuro a Maduro [Cartoon History of Venezuela: From Macuro to Maduro] (1st ed.). Gráficas Pedrazas. ISBN 978-1-7328777-1-9.
- Rivero, Mirtha (2011). La rebelión de los náufragos [The Rebellion of the Castaways] (9th ed.). Alfa. ISBN 978-980-354-295-5.
