= Second inauguration of Carlos Andrés Pérez =

Presidential inauguration in Venezuela

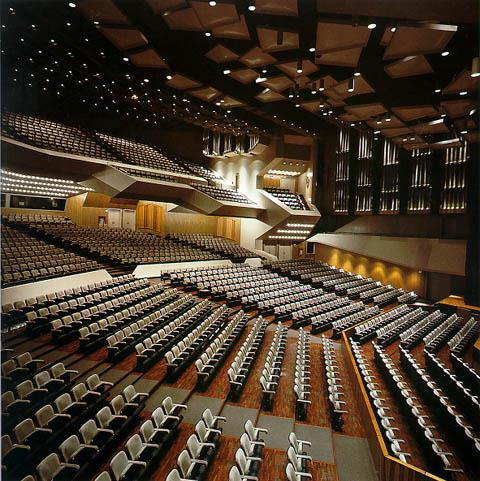
- The Teresa Carreño Theater Ríos Reyna Hall, where the inauguration took place
- Date: 2 February 1989; 37 years ago
- Venue: Teresa Carreño Theater
- Location: Caracas, Venezuela
- Participants: Carlos Andrés Pérez

The second inauguration of Carlos Andrés Pérez as President of Venezuela took place on 2 February 1989. The event took place in the Teresa Carreño Theater Ríos Reyna Hall, being the first time celebrated in a different location than the Federal Legislative Palace, the seat of Congress where presidential inaugurations usually take place in Venezuela. The inauguration counted with the attendance of twenty heads of state (including Fidel Castro), the Vice President of the United States, the Secretary General of the Organization of American States, the President of the Inter-American Development Bank and Secretary General of the OPEC, as well as dozens of foreign affairs ministers, former presidents and ambassadors. The inauguration was also known as "The Coronation" due to its scale and the amount of attendees.

== See also ==
- Second presidency of Carlos Andrés Pérez
