= Celestino Armas =

Venezuelan engineer and politician

Minister for Information and Tourism
- In office 1978–1979
- President: Carlos Andrés Pérez
- Preceded by: Diego Arria

Minister for Energy and Mines
- In office 1989–1992
- President: Carlos Andrés Pérez
- Succeeded by: Alirio Parra

Secretary of the Presidency
- In office 1992–1993
- President: Carlos Andrés Pérez

Personal details
- Born: 15 December 1935 Barcelona, Anzoátegui
- Died: 16 January 2011 Caracas
- Profession: politician, engineer

Celestino Armas (Barcelona, Anzoátegui, 15 December 1935 – 16 January 2011), was a Venezuelan engineer and politician.

== Biography ==
He obtained a degree in engineering from the Central University of Venezuela, and a postgraduate degree from the Colorado School of Mines. Before joining as an active member of AD, he was working in the Guayana iron mines, as an official of the then Ministry of Mines and Hydrocarbons.

He held the Information and Tourism Ministry (1978-1979) in the First Presidency of Carlos Andrés Pérez and playing a key role in the 1976 nationalization of the iron and oil industry. In the months leading up to the Oil Reversal, his party moved him to play the sensitive position of the chair of the Permanent Energy and Mines Commission of the Chamber of Deputies, which was the center of public debate and drafting of the law to nationalize the Petroleum.

Before 30 August 1975, which was the creation of Petróleos de Venezuela, two years of continuous debate took place on a transcendental issue, involving all political parties and influential sectors of national public life, of various shades.

Some aspired to "throw out the companies and pay them nothing, and others who opposed nationalization." In that interregnum the balance and the good sense of Armas, was a very important ingredient.

Because the oil concessions were extinguished in 1983, the national government to comply with the legal rules of the date advance, ordered the payment of compensation. The New York Times called oil nationalization a "model."

In the second presidency of Carlos Andrés Pérez as Minister for Energy and Mines (1989 – 1992) had a leading role in the first process of the so-called Opening of the Venezuelan oil industry, directing the first round of Operational Agreements in 1991. He was elected President of OPEC in June 1991. He repeatedly occupied, albeit on an interim basis, Treasury Ministry and Health and Social Assistance Ministry. In the last months of the constitutional period he served as Secretary of the Presidency.

In the academic sphere, he was a member of the Superior Council of the Simón Bolívar University. Already retired, she was founder of the Institute of Mining and Petroleum (IPEMIN), along with other important Venezuelan professionals, being president of this institution.
