= Adolfo Taylhardat =

Venezuelan diplomat

Adolfo Raúl Taylhardat

President of the United Nations Security Council
- In office 1 September 1993 – 30 September 1993

Permanent Representative of Venezuela in the United Nations
- In office 20 August 1993 – 9 July 2017
- Preceded by: Diego Arria

Venezuelan Ambassador to France
- In office 3 June 1991 – 9 July 2017
- President: Carlos Andrés Pérez

Personal details
- Born: 6 May 1934 La Victoria, Venezuela
- Died: 9 July 2017 (aged 83)

Adolfo Raúl Taylhardat (6 May 1934 – 9 July 2017) was a Venezuelan diplomat.

== Career ==
A graduate in international studies (1957; doctorate 1960) and law (1965) from the Central University of Venezuela, he occupied a range of diplomatic posts since entering Venezuela's diplomatic service in 1955. Taylhardat was Venezuelan Permanent Representative of Venezuela to the United Nations from August 1993 and was President of the Security Council (September 1993), during Venezuela's membership of the Security Council.

He died on 9 July 2017.
