= Arria formula meeting =

UN meeting format

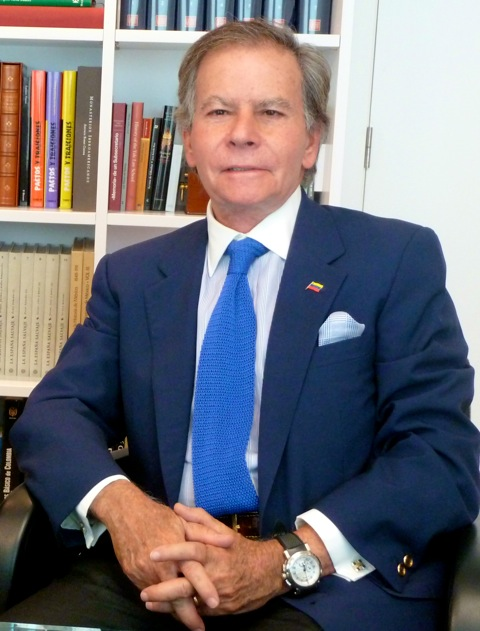
Diego Arria, the originator of the Arria formula

An "Arria formula" meeting is an informal meeting of members of the United Nations Security Council (UNSC), which must be convened by a member of the UNSC in order for the meeting to take place.

Although derived from the formal meetings of the UNSC, the Arria formula distinguishes itself from typical UNSC meetings due to its informal nature, which allows Arria formula meetings to have no obligations to meet the official requirements of typical UNSC meetings. This means that while regular meetings of the Security Council require the presence of all 15 members of the council, follow a formal structure, and do not hear testimonies from non-members, individuals or non-governmental organisations, Arria formula meetings allow individuals, organisations, non-state actors and high delegations (from member states of the UN not represented on the Security Council) to engage in direct dialogue with UNSC members in a legitimate and confidential setting.

Arria formula meetings are presided over by a member of the UNSC, who acts as a facilitator of discussion, rather than the President of the Security Council. Sometimes, the meetings are also held in collaboration with states not on the council who think it would be beneficial to hear from specific individuals, organisations or institutions.

== History ==
The first Arria formula meeting was held in 1992, after Venezuelan Ambassador Diego Arria, who during this time was the president of the Security Council, was contacted by a Croatian priest, Fra Joko Zorko who wanted to speak to members of the UNSC to report an eyewitness account of violence in Bosnia and Herzegovina during the Crisis of Yugoslavia. As the structure of the UNSC meetings would not allow for the testimony to be heard during a security council meeting, and there was no formal way to hold a meeting between the UNSC and Fra Joko Zorko, Ambassador Diego Arria invited council members to meet outside the Council chambers in the UN delegates lounge to share the testimony of Fra Joko Zorko.

After this first meeting, Ambassador Diego Arria decided to institutionalise the meeting and it became known as the Arria formula.

Ambassador Diego Arria created the Arria formula meeting to allow for informal consultation to take place so actors could engage in consultation with members of the UNSC in order for UNSC members to be accountable and honest in their consultations with non-member actors. Ambassador Arria preferred to create an informal meeting with members of the security council rather than encourage bilateral meetings with major powers because "in an informal consultation in front of other countries, they have to be honest". This is in contrast to bilateral meetings in which he said that "each country could tell whatever was pleasant".

=== Development ===
Arria formula meetings have been held every year since the meeting’s inception in 1992. The meetings are held whenever a UNSC council member wishes to use the forum. The flexibility of the meeting means that there is no regular schedule of Arria formula meetings, and as such the frequency of Arria formula meetings since 1992 has varied widely.

In the early years after the meetings conception, the forum of the Arria formula meeting was restricted, and only allowed officials, high delegates and heads of states to engage in dialogue with UNSC members. In 1996, some elected members of the UNSC tried to broaden the use of Arria formula meetings to include non-governmental organisations (NGOs) and non-state representatives to facilitate greater use of the meetings as the forum did not yet allow NGOs and non-members of the council to speak to the Council as a whole. However, some Council members including the United Kingdom and Russia wanted to continue restricted use of the Arria formula meetings in preference of hearing only from high representatives and the head of states. With a lack of support from permanent council members, briefings to hear non-governmental organisations and non-official voices was opposed. In response to this, it was argued that hearing the voices of non-official individuals and non-government organisations was the initial reason the Arria formula meeting was invented.

In 1996, Ambassador Juan Somavía of Chile attempted to organise a meeting between Council members and humanitarian NGOs including Oxfam, Médecins Sans Frontières and the International Committee of the Red Cross. When this was not approved by other Council members, Ambassador Somavía developed another formula, known as the Somavía Formula.

In 1997, there was a dispute within the Council in regards to a proposal by Portugal to invite Amnesty International Secretariat General Pierre Sané to give a briefing at an Arria formula meeting. Due to the dispute between Council members, the meeting with Sané was called an 'ad hoc' event instead of being given the status of an Arria formula meeting.

In 1999, the question of expanding the Arria formula meeting was brought up again as the Council started to adopt flexible and more open procedures. By this time, opinion had begun to shift among permanent members as the Council began to favour the inclusion consultation with non-governmental organisations.

On 12 April 2000, the UNSC held its first regular Arria formula briefing with NGO leaders, opening the forum up for regular inclusion of NGOs.

Arria formula meetings are now open to a range of actors, including high level delegations from member states not represented on the council, representatives of civil society and non-state actors, and representatives of territories which are not recognised as states but are stakeholders in issues before the council.

== Structure ==
Arria formula meetings are characterised by their informal nature and flexibility. As such, the UNSC has not precisely defined the structure or briefing of Arria formula meetings.

For an Arria formula meeting to occur, it must be convened by a member of the UNSC. Arria formula meetings are chaired by the inviting member, and called for the purpose of a briefing which is given by one or more persons who are considered experts in the matter of concern to the council.

However, although Arria formula meetings are convened by a member of United Nations Security Council, the meetings subsidiary to the UNSC are not part of the Charter of the United Nations. Arria formula meetings, therefore, are not required to follow the provisional rules of procedure which defines the UNSC.

Arria formula meetings are authorised by the UN under Article 30 of the UN charter which states that "the Security Council shall adopt its own rules of procedure." This provides the UNSC with the power and discretion to establish the Arria formula meetings outside of typical UNSC structure. Article 30 of the UN charter also authorises Arria formula meetings to function with an informal structure, within a flexible procedural framework that allows the Council greater flexibility to informed of issues of international peace and security.

As an informal meeting, Arria formula meetings only occur when a UNSC member convenes one. There is no regular meeting or formal structure that the Arria formula is required to follow; therefore the frequency of the meeting can vary from year to year. Typically, however, Arria formula meetings have been known to take place each month. Holding an Arria formula meeting does not require the consensus of all 15 members of the Security Council, thus allowing the council member who convened the meeting flexibility and discretion.

All Arria formula meetings are announced by the president of the UNSC at the beginning of each month, as a part of the regular schedule of the Council. All meetings are also provided with full interpretation by the Secretariat, and meetings of the UNSC are not held at the same time as Arria formula meetings.

Although the exact structure of Arria formula meetings differ with each meeting, the general procedure that the meetings follow begins with a statement from the convening council member. After the convening council member addresses the meetings, the floor is then opened up to discussion between those present at the meeting. The convening security council member acts as a facilitator of discussion, allowing dialogue to take place.

Due to the informal nature of Arria formula meetings, the meetings often have no record or outcome and are not publicised by the UN like Security Council meetings are. Arria formula meetings are rather chronicled by references to the meetings in council documents and letters addressed to the president of security. This includes summaries of the Arria formula meetings, speeches and concept notes.

Arria formula meetings began to be broadcast in 2016, when the meeting on the humanitarian situation in Aleppo, Syria, was webcast on the UN Web TV. Since this event, other Arria formula meetings have also been broadcast and archived on the UN website.

=== Purpose ===
Arria formula meetings were first created to enable dialogue to take place between members and non-members of the UNSC, in a way that would allow member states to be frank in a private setting. The Arria formula allows member states to directly discuss issues which fall within the responsibility of the council to encourage peace and cooperation. As the forum developed, Arria formula meetings have expanded to include interaction with Human Rights Council Commissions of Inquiry, individuals, non-governmental organisations and institutions.

The use of Arria formula meetings is largely to enhance contact with civil society, non-governmental organisations and non-members of the security council. These meetings have the ability to introduce to the security council valuable information that would not be able to be heard by the security council outside of this forum. Specifically, the forum allows security council members to access information and expertise provided by outsiders to the council.

In some cases, the Arria formula meeting has been used when there has not been any council agreement for a formal security council meeting. Examples of this occurring include the 13 December 2007 meeting concerning the council working methods and the 15 February 2013 meeting regarding security dimensions on climate change.

The purposes of calling Arria formula meetings have changed over time. Since 2012, Arria formula meetings have regularly been used to provide United Nations Security Council Members with interaction with Human Rights Council Commissions of Inquiry. For example, In 2012, UNSC members held an Arria formula meeting with the Human Rights Council's Commission of Inquiry on Syria. This meetings inclusion of the Human Right Council enabled a focus on accountability and the impact of human rights violations on civilians as well as a humanitarian assessment to take place. In 2014, Council members held an Arria formula meeting with the Human Rights Council's Commission of Inquiry on the Democratic People's Republic of Korea. The forum of the Arria formula meeting was utilised in this occasion to provide an opportunity for discussion to take place in regards to the human rights situation faced by those in the Republic of Korea and facilitate dialogue about how the UN can implement recommendations from the commission.

=== Significance and outcomes ===
Since the establishment of Arria formula meetings, there have been a number of notable meetings which have had significant impact on international relations.

On October 23, 2000, women from Sierra Leone, Guatemala, Somalia, Tanzania and intergovernmental organisations were invited to an Arria formula meeting revealing gender-specific conditions and the acts that women experience during war. This meeting addressed the leadership which women demonstrate in conflict, including peace building and conflict prevention, recognising that the leadership of women is undervalued. As a result of this Arria meeting, the Security Council held an open session, in which more than 40 speakers addressed the issues of peace, women and security. The Security Council then passed Resolution 1325 on the 31st of October 2000 which reaffirmed the significance of women in the resolution and prevention of conflicts, and the importance of the equal participation of women for the promotion and maintenance of peace.

The Arria meeting on women, peace, and security was also particularly significant because although in the past the UNSC had condemned atrocities against women and their suffering in armed conflict, women's issues had not been consistently integrated in the Council's activities, nor had the Security Council recognised women as agents of peace.

The informal structure and flexible nature of Arria formula meetings means that Security Council members still have a forum accessible to them in situations where formal UNSC meetings are not able to take place. In March 2018, the Security Council failed to hold a public meeting on the situation in Syria after the meeting was vetoed by four security council members. As a result of this, an Arria meeting was organised on the spot led by France, the United States, the United Kingdom, Sweden, the Netherlands, and Peru, and the High Commissioner of the Human Rights Council was invited to share his briefing in regards to the situation in Syria. The forum of the Arria formula meeting enabled the Security Council to come together and be briefed on the violations of human rights that have taken across Syria, including the targeting of civilians.
