= Ramón Escovar Salom =

Venezuelan lawyer and politician (1926–2008)

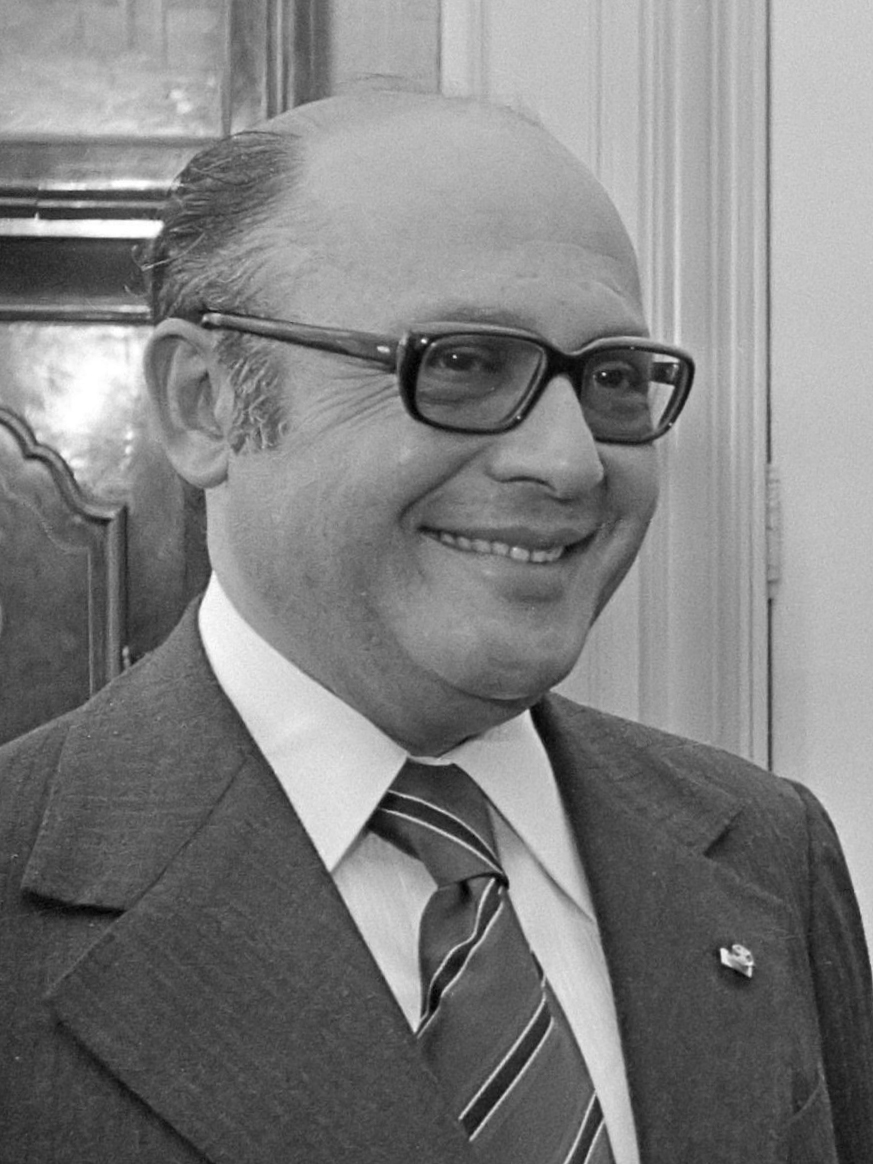
- Escovar in 1977

Minister of Internal Affairs
- In office 2 February 1994 – 14 March 1996
- President: Rafael Caldera
- Preceded by: José Guillermo Andueza
- Succeeded by: Carlos Delgado Chapellín

Prosecutor General of Venezuela
- In office 2 June 1989 – 2 February 1994
- Preceded by: Héctor Serpa Arcas
- Succeeded by: Iván Darío Badell

Minister of Foreign Affairs
- In office 23 January 1975 – 14 July 1977
- President: Carlos Andrés Pérez
- Preceded by: Simón Alberto Consalvi
- Succeeded by: Efraín Schacht Aristeguieta

Minister of Justice
- In office 4 November 1964 – 23 March 1966
- President: Raúl Leoni
- Preceded by: José Núñez Aristimuño
- Succeeded by: Miguel Ángel Burelli Rivas

Personal details
- Born: Ramón Escovar Salom; 23 July 1926 Barquisimeto, Lara, Republic of Venezuela
- Died: 9 September 2008 (aged 82) Caracas, Venezuela
- Party: Democratic Action
- Education: Central University of Venezuela (LLB, PhD)

Ramón Escovar Salom (Barquisimeto, Venezuela, July 23, 1926 – Caracas, September 9, 2008) was a Venezuelan politician, lawyer, and academic. He served as minister in the cabinets of Raúl Leoni, Carlos Andrés Pérez, and Rafael Caldera, in addition to having been a deputy, senator, ambassador, and also Attorney General of the Republic between 1989 and 1994, where he accused President Carlos Andrés Pérez of corruption, which led to his removal and subsequent debate over a possible conflict of interest.

== Early life ==
Escovar Salom graduated in Law in 1949 and earned a doctorate in Political Science from the Central University of Venezuela, in Caracas.

He served as a tenured professor at that university; as a researcher at Harvard University in the United States (1979–1981); and as a visiting professor at the University of Cambridge in England (1982–1983).

He was a member of the Academy of Political and Social Sciences of Venezuela from 1976.

== Political career ==
=== Deputy and Senator ===
Escovar Salom entered political life as a militant of the social democratic party Democratic Action. He was elected deputy in 1948, becoming the youngest congressman in Latin America, at the age of 21.

A decade later, he was elected senator for the Federal District for the 1959–1964 term, becoming the youngest senator in Latin America, this time at the age of 31.

He was elected deputy for Lara State for the 1964–1969 period.

=== Minister of Justice ===
Ramón Escovar Salom served as Minister of Justice in the government of Raúl Leoni (1964–1966).

=== Secretary of the Presidency and Deputy ===
Escovar Salom was elected deputy for Lara State for the 1974–1979 period. He was appointed Secretary of the Presidency during the first government of Carlos Andrés Pérez (1974–1975).

=== Minister of Foreign Affairs ===
Escovar Salom's second ministry in CAP's first government was Foreign Affairs, which he held between 1975 and 1977. He made 18 official visits during his tenure: Guyana (1975), Brazil (1975), Curaçao, Aruba, and Bonaire (1975), Argentina (1975), the United Kingdom (1975), the Soviet Union (1975), Peru (1976), Barbados (1976), Costa Rica (1976), Guatemala (1976), Nicaragua (1976), Honduras (1976), El Salvador (1976), Belize (1976), Panama (1976), and Poland (1977), where Escovar Salom was suddenly dismissed during the second day of his official visit.

=== Ambassador to France and Representative to the UN ===
In the diplomatic field, Escovar Salom served as Venezuelan ambassador to the Government of France (1986–1989) and Permanent Representative of Venezuela to the United Nations.

=== Attorney General of the Republic ===
In 1989, Escovar Salom was elected Attorney General of the Republic. He accused President Carlos Andrés Pérez of embezzlement in March 1993, which resulted in his removal by Congress and a subsequent trial. Pérez accused him of conspiring to convict him.

==== Chief Prosecutor in The Hague ====
In 1993, Escovar Salom was appointed by the United Nations Security Council as Chief Prosecutor of the International Criminal Tribunal for the former Yugoslavia in The Hague, Netherlands, but resigned before taking office, as scheduled for 1994.

=== Minister of Interior ===
Escovar Salom held the position of Minister of Interior (1994–1996), this time in the second government of Rafael Caldera. After an attack by Colombian guerrillas on the Carabobo naval post, Minister Escovar Salom declared a "national deportation plan and a census of foreigners to free Venezuela from undesirable foreigners"; one of these operations took place in Petare, where 167 Colombians defined as illegal were detained by the Cuerpo Técnico de Policía Judicial.

== Later years and death ==
He was an opponent of the government of Hugo Chávez and also criticized of the Carmona Decree, the legal instrument enacted during the short-lived 2002 coup against Chávez. Ramón Escovar Salom died on September 9, 2008, in Caracas due to cancer.
