= Diego Arria =

Venezuelan politician and diplomat

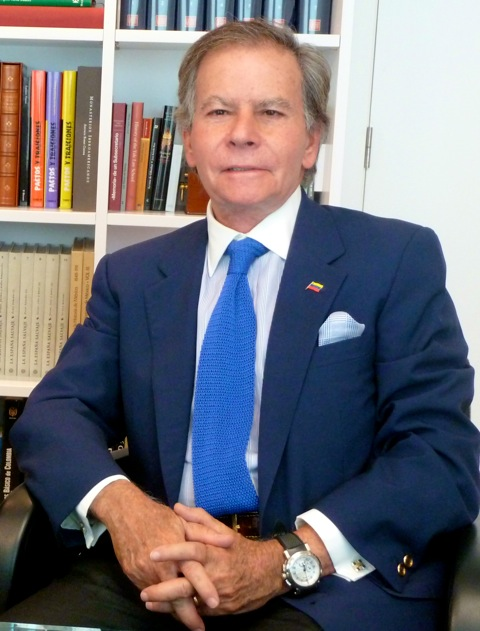

President of the United Nations Security Council
- In office 1 March 1992 – 31 March 1992

Permanent Representative of Venezuela in the United Nations
- In office 11 March 1991 – August 1993
- President: Carlos Andrés Pérez
- Succeeded by: Adolfo Raul Taylhardat

Minister of Information and Tourism
- In office February 1977 – 17 March 1978
- President: Carlos Andrés Pérez
- Succeeded by: Celestino Armas

Governor of Caracas, Capital District
- In office 15 March 1974 – February 1977
- President: Carlos Andrés Pérez
- Preceded by: Guillermo Alvarez Bajarez
- Succeeded by: Manuel Montilla Caceres

President of the Corporación Nacional de Hotelería y Turismo (CONAHOTU)
- In office 12 March 1969 – 2 February 1974
- President: Rafael Caldera

Personal details
- Born: 8 October 1938 (age 87) Caracas, Venezuela
- Education: University of Michigan

Diego Enrique Arria Salicetti (born 8 October 1938 in Caracas, Venezuela) is a Venezuelan politician and diplomat who served as Venezuela's Permanent Representative to the United Nations (1991–1993) and President of the Security Council (March 1992).

He was governor of the Federal District of Caracas in the mid-1970s. Other positions have included diplomatic fellow at the Council on Foreign Relations and visiting scholar at Columbia University. Arria is a critic of former President of Venezuela, Hugo Chávez, and denounced him at the International Criminal Court at The Hague for crimes against humanity. Chávez died before the court could judge his case.

He is a diplomatic fellow at the Council on Foreign Relations and visiting scholar at Columbia University. He is a member of the noard of directors of the Institute of the Americas and of Freedom Now, and of the Board of Advisors of Inter-American Dialogue. He has been a Director at The Columbus Group, and is currently the Chairman of the Advisory Board at Athelera LLC as well as a Member of the Board of Advisors at VMS Associates, LLC.

== Early life ==
Arria was schooled partly in Caracas and partly at the Augusta Military Academy at Fort Defiance, Virginia. He obtained a degree in economics and political science from the University of Michigan. Arria worked for the Inter-American Development Bank in Washington, D.C., until he returned to Venezuela in 1969, initially as Director of Tourism in Rafael Caldera's Ministry of Development, and later as president of the CONAHOTU (National Corporation of Hotels and Tourism), and president of Venezuelan Tourism Corporation.

== Political career ==
Arria resigned as head of the Venezuela Tourism Corporation to create the political movement Causa Común (Common Cause) that later supported the presidential candidacy of Carlos Andrés Pérez. In 1973, Arria was elected member of the National Congress, representing the state of Miranda. Shortly after Carlos Andrés was elected in March 1974, he appointed Arria Governor of the Federal District (Caracas), at a time when this was one of the most important presidential appointments. In September 1974, he went to Chile to negotiate with President Pinochet for the release of his friend Orlando Letelier, who later became a colleague at the Inter American Development Bank in D.C. Pinochet ordered the release of Letelier, who was told by the officer in charge that "the arm of DINA is long; General Pinochet will not and does not tolerate activities against his government." This was a clear warning to Letelier that living in exile in Venezuela and United States would not guarantee his safety. In fact, not long after in 1976, Letelier was murdered in a car bomb attack in Washington D.C on Pinochet's order. Arria intervened again by bringing Letelier's body to Caracas for burial, where it remained until the end of Pinochet's rule. He subsequently moved from the governorship to become Minister of Information and Tourism in February 1977. He resigned on 17 March 1978 in order to stand as an independent candidate in the 1978 Venezuelan presidential election. As part of his campaign, he published two books: "Primero La Gente" ("The People First") and "Dedicación a una Causa" ("Dedication to a Cause").

In 2012, Arria stood as an independent candidate for the presidential nomination of the Coalition for Democratic Unity for the 2012 Venezuelan presidential election. Primary elections were held on 12 February 2012, with Henrique Capriles Radonski winning the nomination.

=== United Nations ===
Arria was Venezuela's Permanent Representative to the United Nations from 1991 to 1993, and President of the Security Council (March 1992), during Venezuela's membership of the Security Council. Arria later became Special Advisor to Kofi Annan, Secretary General of the UN.

==== Arria (formula) meetings ====
As UNSC president, he initiated the eponymous 'Arria formula' a very informal consultation process which affords members of the Security Council the opportunity to hear persons in a confidential, informal setting. These meetings are presided over by a member of the Council who acts as a facilitator for the discussion rather than the President of the council. Arria has described this formula as a way of ensuring that members 'have to be honest'. He was chairman during the massacres at Srebrenica. After visiting the enclave, he warned of its impending doom and predicted that a massacre would take place, saying it was "slow motion Genocide" and describing the besieged enclave as "a concentration camp policed by UNPROFOR". According to the UN,

During the March 1992 Council presidency of Venezuela, Ambassador Diego Arria was contacted by Fra Joko Zovko, a Croatian priest who was eager to convey an eyewitness account of the violence in Bosnia and Herzegovina to members of the Council. Not being able to find a formal way to hold a meeting, Arria decided to invite Council members to meet with Fra Joko in the UN delegates lounge. This experience gave Arria the idea of institutionalising this innovative informal meeting format which came to be known as the “Arria-formula”. With the concurrence of Council members, subsequent Arria meetings moved from the delegates lounge to a UN conference room in the basement and were supported by simultaneous interpretation. More recently, many Arria meetings have been held in large UN conference rooms such as, for example, the Trusteeship Council chamber.

One Arria formula meeting did gain attention; it was hosted by the Russian UN delegation dealing with OPCW reporting on the Douma chemical attack in the Syrian Civil War, which was held at the UNSC on 20 January 2020. Other Arria formula meetings have been held on Israeli settlements and religious persecution in China and Pakistan.

=== Ranch expropriation ===
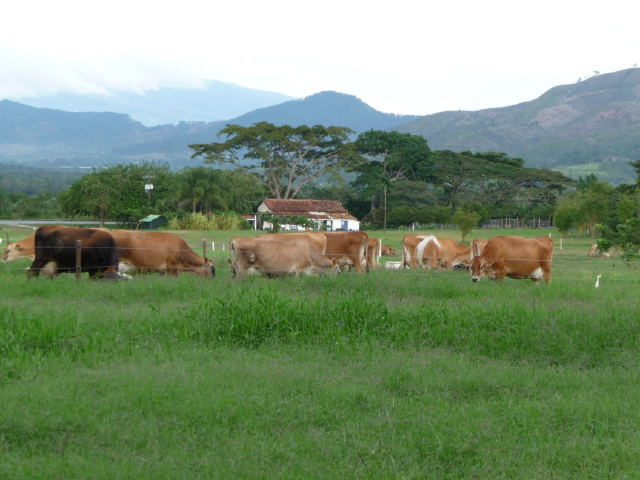
La Carolina taken by Arria one month before the expropriation, according to him.

On 30 April 2010, Arria's ranch, "La Carolina" in Yaracuy State, was taken over by the Venezuelan government. According to government officials, the ranch was unproductive and was a case of idle lands; according to Arria, the farm had 300 cattle and 90% of it was under some form of agricultural development. Becoming aware of the expropriation threat, Arria took photos of the farm and the cattle and posted them on the Internet, including the one used here. According to Arria, the expropriation was a reaction to Arria's participation in the Oslo Freedom Forum, where he stated that Chavez will have to face international justice one day for his "crimes" against the Venezuelan people. He has since described the ranch's seizure as "pillaging and ransacking."

In November 2011, Arria filed charges for crimes against humanity against Chávez at the International Criminal Court in The Hague.

=== Arrest warrant ===
Diego Arria and several other opposition figures were the victims of an attempt by the Venezuelan government to accuse them of a fabricated plot. A top Venezuelan government official, Jorge Rodriguez, alleged that he had uncovered emails between the accused that proved their guilt, resulting in Venezuela's attorney general Luisa Ortega Díaz subpoenaing Arria as a witness, along with María Corina Machado, Pedro Burelli, and Ricardo Koesling, and a week later, on June 11, warrants were issued for their arrest. However, the defendants hired Kivu, a US-based cybersecurity company, with Kivu performing an analysis of the alleged emails covered in the Venezuelan government's report, stating that there was "no evidence of the existence of any emails between Pedro Burelli's Google email accounts and the alleged recipients," that the alleged emails had "many indications of user manipulation," and that "Venezuelan officials used forged emails to accuse government adversaries of plotting to kill President Nicolas Maduro."

== Filmography ==
Arria portrays Venezuelan foreign minister Ignacio Iribarren Borges in the 2008 film Che.
