= Reinaldo Figueredo Planchart =

Reinaldo Figueredo Planchart is a Venezuelan politician, who was Secretary of the Presidency of Carlos Andrés Pérez and chancellor of Venezuela during his second presidency.

== Career ==
In 1976, he accompanied President Carlos Andrés Pérez on his trip to the Soviet Union after then‑Chancellor Ramón Escovar Salom refused to do so.

=== Secretary of the Presidency and Chancellor ===
He served as Secretary of the Presidency in 1989 and subsequently as Minister of Foreign Affairs in the second government of Carlos Andrés Pérez, between 1989 and 1991.

=== Trial and arrest ===
In 1993, a trial began against him, along with Carlos Andrés Pérez and minister Alejandro Izaguirre, as well as three other people.

On May 26, 1993, he entered the El Junquito prison. On May 30, he was convicted by the Supreme Court of Justice for "aggravated generic embezzlement", an "act committed in the circumstances of place, manner and time that have been established, to be fulfilled the sentence of two years and four months in prison" and "condemns the aforementioned defendant to restitute, repair or compensate for the damage caused to public assets".

The Inter-American Commission on Human Rights of the OAS ruled in 2000 that "the Venezuelan State violated to the detriment of Reinaldo Figueredo Planchart article 8(1) of the Convention in regarding his right to be heard by a judge or court competent in the substantiation of the criminal accusation that was carried out against him".

On August 2, 2000, the new Supreme Court of Justice prescribed its charges, being released.

=== United Nations ===
He also served as an advisor to the United Nations (UN). He was a member of the Truth Commission for El Salvador.

== Political positions ==
Figueredo Planchart considers the presidency of Nicolás Maduro illegitimate and has disagreed as former chancellor in the policy that his government has exercised around the Guyana–Venezuela territorial dispute.
